= Irion County High School =

Location
- 301 North 3rd Street; Mertzon, Texas 76941-0469; United States; 31.260477°N 100.823235°W

Information
- School type: Public High School
- Established: c.1908
- School district: Irion County Independent School District
- Superintendent: Sara Moore
- Principal: Shannon Chapman
- Staff: 18.57 (on an FTE basis)
- Grades: 7-12
- Enrollment: 137 (2023-2024)
- Student to teacher ratio: 7.38
- Colors: Purple, black, and white
- Athletics conference: UIL Class 1A
- Mascot: Hornet (Buzz)
- Website: secondary.irion-isd.org

Irion County High School is a public high school located in Mertzon, Texas (US) and classified as a 1A school by the UIL. It is part of the Irion County Independent School District located in east central Irion County. In 2015, the school was rated "Met Standard" by the Texas Education Agency.

Residents in Sherwood, Barnhart, and Mertzon are enrolled in the Irion County school district.

In the 2015–2016 school year, the West Texas Boys Ranch left the school, due to administrative pressure.

It is the top rated 1A school in Texas.

== Athletics ==
=== Boys ===
- Basketball
- Cross Country
- Football
- Golf
- Powerlifting
- Tennis
- Track and Field

=== Girls ===
- Basketball
- Cross Country
- Football
- Golf
- Powerlifting
- Tennis
- Track and Field
- Cheerleading

=== State Titles ===
- Boys Track
  - 2001(1A), 2002(1A)
- Girls Cross Country
  - 2026(1A)

== Band ==
=== State Titles ===
- Marching Band -
  - 1993(1A), 2019 (1A), 2024 (1A)
- Marching Band Sweepstakes -
  - 1986(1A), 1991(1A)

== One Act Play ==
=== Awards ===
- 2012: 2nd runner up at State competition performing A Streetcar Named Desire directed by Billy McDaris.
- 2011: Advanced to Regional level competition where they were the alternate to state with their performance in A Lie of the Mind, directed by Billy McDaris.
- 2009: Advanced to the Regional level where they received several honorable mentions and Best Actor for their performance of The Bridegroom of Blowing Rock, also directed by Billy McDaris.
