= National Register of Historic Places listings in Irion County, Texas =

Location of Irion County in Texas

This is a list of the National Register of Historic Places listings in Irion County, Texas.

This is intended to be a complete list of properties and districts listed on the National Register of Historic Places in Irion County, Texas. There is one property listed on the National Register in the county.

This National Park Service list is complete through NPS recent listings posted March 21, 2025.

== Current listings ==
The locations of National Register properties may be seen in a mapping service provided.

	Name on the Register	Image	Date listed	Location	City or town	Description
1	Irion County Courthouse	Irion County Courthouse	August 29, 1977 (#77001455)	Public Sq. 31°16′47″N 100°47′41″W	Sherwood	

== See also ==
- National Register of Historic Places listings in Texas
- Recorded Texas Historic Landmarks in Irion County
