= Irion County, Texas =

County in Texas, United States

- County
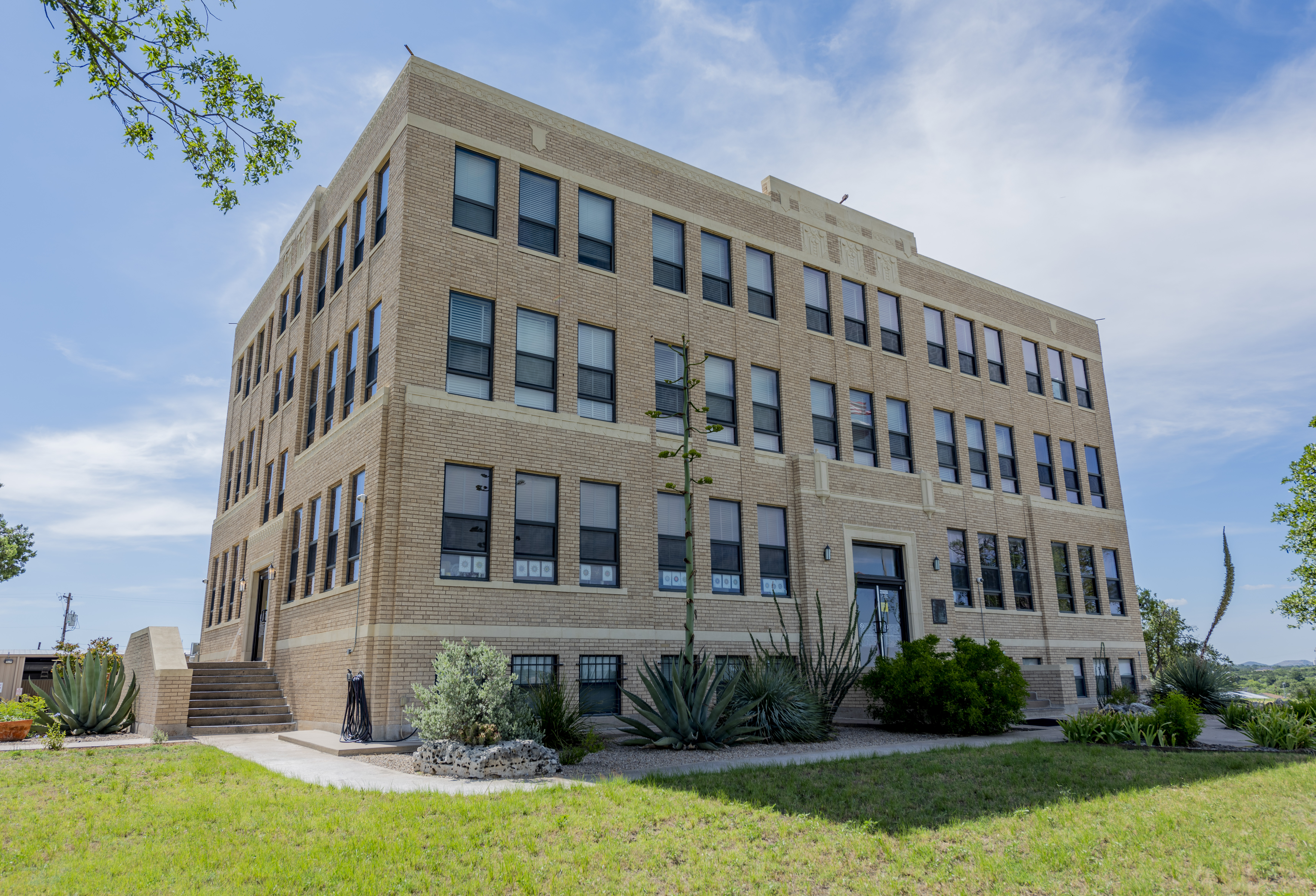
- The Irion County Courthouse in Mertzon

- Location within the U.S. state of Texas
- Coordinates: 31°18′N 100°59′W
- Country: United States
- State: Texas
- Founded: 1889
- Named for: Robert Anderson Irion
- Seat: Mertzon
- Largest city: Mertzon

Area
  - Total: 1,052 sq mi (2,720 km^{2})
  - Land: 1,052 sq mi (2,720 km^{2})
  - Water: 0.07 sq mi (0.18 km^{2}) 0.01%

Population (2020)
  - Total: 1,513
  - Estimate (2025): 1,463 ▼
  - Density: 1.438/sq mi (0.5553/km^{2})
- Time zone: UTC−6 (Central)
  - Summer (DST): UTC−5 (CDT)
- Congressional district: 11th
- Website: www.co.irion.tx.us

Irion County (/ˈaɪriən/ EYE-ree-ən) is a county located on the Edwards Plateau in the U.S. state of Texas. As of the 2020 census, its population was 1,513. Its county seat is Mertzon. The county is named for Robert Anderson Irion, a secretary of state of the Republic of Texas.

Irion County is included in the San Angelo metropolitan area.

== History ==
From 1858 to 1861, Butterfield Overland Mail crossed the region.

In 1876, John Arden brought the first flock of sheep from California, and Billy Childress established the Longhorn 7D Ranch.

The Texas Legislature formed Irion County from Tom Green County in 1889. Sherwood became the county seat.

Oil was discovered in Irion County in 1928.

In 1936, Mertzon became the county seat.

In 2020 Irion was the slowest county to comply with the Supreme Court's Obergefell v. Hodges ruling, forbidding the ban on same-sex marriages.

The Old Irion County Courthouse in Sherwood is the only property in the county listed on the National Register of Historic Places.

== Geography ==
According to the U.S. Census Bureau, the county has a total area of 1,052 square miles (2,720 km^{2}), of which 1,052 sq mi (2,720 km^{2}) are land and 0.07 square miles (0.18 km^{2}) (0.01%) is covered by water. The Spraberry Trend, the third-largest oil field in the United States by remaining reserves, underlies much of the county.

=== Major highways ===
- U.S. Highway 67
- State Highway 163

=== Adjacent counties ===
- Tom Green County (north and east)
- Schleicher County (southeast)
- Crockett County (southwest)
- Reagan County (west)

== Demographics ==
Historical population
Census	Pop.	Note	%±
1890	870		—
1900	848		−2.5%
1910	1,283		51.3%
1920	1,610		25.5%
1930	2,049		27.3%
1940	1,963		−4.2%
1950	1,590		−19.0%
1960	1,183		−25.6%
1970	1,070		−9.6%
1980	1,386		29.5%
1990	1,629		17.5%
2000	1,771		8.7%
2010	1,599		−9.7%
2020	1,513		−5.4%
2025 (est.)	1,463	▼	−3.3%
U.S. Decennial Census; 1850–2010 2010 2020

=== Racial and ethnic composition ===
Irion County, Texas – Racial and ethnic composition Note: the US Census treats Hispanic/Latino as an ethnic category. This table excludes Latinos from the racial categories and assigns them to a separate category. Hispanics/Latinos may be of any race.
Race / Ethnicity (NH = Non-Hispanic)	Pop 1980	Pop 1990	Pop 2000	Pop 2010	Pop 2020	% 1980	% 1990	% 2000	% 2010	% 2020
White alone (NH)	1,127	1,240	1,321	1,153	1,112	81.31%	76.12%	74.59%	72.11%	73.50%
Black or African American alone (NH)	0	2	4	11	6	0.00%	0.12%	0.23%	0.69%	0.40%
Native American or Alaska Native alone (NH)	2	1	6	7	9	0.14%	0.06%	0.34%	0.44%	0.59%
Asian alone (NH)	0	0	0	3	0	0.00%	0.00%	0.00%	0.19%	0.00%
Native Hawaiian or Pacific Islander alone (NH)	x	x	0	0	1	x	x	0.00%	0.00%	0.07%
Other race alone (NH)	0	1	0	0	1	0.00%	0.06%	0.00%	0.00%	0.07%
Mixed race or Multiracial (NH)	x	x	4	18	35	x	x	0.23%	1.13%	2.31%
Hispanic or Latino (any race)	257	385	436	407	349	18.54%	23.63%	24.62%	25.45%	23.07%
Total	1,386	1,629	1,771	1,599	1,513	100.00%	100.00%	100.00%	100.00%	100.00%

=== 2020 census ===
As of the 2020 census, the county had a population of 1,513. The median age was 45.3 years. 21.7% of residents were under the age of 18 and 21.4% of residents were 65 years of age or older. For every 100 females there were 99.9 males, and for every 100 females age 18 and over there were 99.7 males age 18 and over.

The racial makeup of the county was 79.3% White, 0.5% Black or African American, 1.1% American Indian and Alaska Native, <0.1% Asian, 0.1% Native Hawaiian and Pacific Islander, 8.3% from some other race, and 10.8% from two or more races. Hispanic or Latino residents of any race comprised 23.1% of the population.

<0.1% of residents lived in urban areas, while 100.0% lived in rural areas.

There were 617 households in the county, of which 32.1% had children under the age of 18 living in them. Of all households, 58.0% were married-couple households, 16.7% were households with a male householder and no spouse or partner present, and 22.5% were households with a female householder and no spouse or partner present. About 21.9% of all households were made up of individuals and 12.0% had someone living alone who was 65 years of age or older.

There were 785 housing units, of which 21.4% were vacant. Among occupied housing units, 79.1% were owner-occupied and 20.9% were renter-occupied. The homeowner vacancy rate was 2.5% and the rental vacancy rate was 3.5%.

=== 2000 census ===
As of the census of 2000, 1,771 people, 694 households, and 523 were families residing in the county. The population density was two people per square mile (0.77 people/km^{2}). The 914 housing units averaged one units per square mile (0.39 units/km^{2}). The racial makeup of the county was 90.68% White, 0.40% African American, 0.79% Native American, 6.55% from other races, and 1.58% from two or more races. About 24.62% of the population was Hispanic or Latino of any race.

Of the 694 households, 32.40% had children under the age of 18 living with them, 64.80% were married couples living together, 6.60% had a female householder with no husband present, and 24.50% were not families. About 21.80% of all households were made up of individuals, and 11.20% had someone living alone who was 65 years of age or older. The average household size was 2.55, and the average family size was 2.97.

In the county, the age distribution was 26.70% under 18, 4.70% from 18 to 24, 26.90% from 25 to 44, 26.10% from 45 to 64, and 15.60% who were 65 or older. The median age was 40 years. For every 100 females, there were 100.30 males. For every 100 females age 18 and over, there were 99.40 males.

The median income for a household in the county was $37,500, and for a family was $45,458. Males had a median income of $35,642 versus $20,395 for females. The per capita income for the county was $20,515. About 8.30% of families and 8.40% of the population were below the poverty line, including 7.20% of those under age 18 and 7.90% of those age 65 or over.

== Communities ==
- Barnhart
- Mertzon (county seat)
- Sherwood

== Notable native ==
- Laura Bullion, female Old West outlaw, born in Knickerbocker.

== Politics ==
As of 2017, only Irion County among those in Texas had stated it would refuse to issue licenses to same-sex couples. Many counties started issuing same-sex marriage licenses within hours of the Obergefell ruling on June 26, 2015, while others awaited direction from state officials, local county attorney advice, or issuance of corrected state marriage license forms. Irion County adopted this reason for not issuing licenses. No marriage applications have yet been made by same-sex couples in Irion County. Irion County was the sole holdout in Texas, with reports that the situation was still in effect two years later. When Alabama replaced marriage licenses with marriage certificates and required that all counties issue them, Irion County became the only remaining county in the country that would not allow same-sex couples to marry. As of 2020, Irion County has a new county clerk who has stated she would issue marriage licenses to same-sex couples.

Irion County was one of four Texas counties Ross Perot won in the 1992 presidential election. Otherwise, the county, like most of rural Texas, is extremely Republican. It has not voted for a Democratic presidential candidate since Texas native Lyndon B. Johnson won a statewide and national landslide in 1964.

United States presidential election results for Irion County, Texas
Year	Republican		Democratic		Third party(ies)	
Year	No.	%	No.	%	No.	%
1912	0	0.00%	132	89.80%	15	10.20%
1916	5	3.01%	150	90.36%	11	6.63%
1920	45	20.09%	148	66.07%	31	13.84%
1924	73	25.35%	205	71.18%	10	3.47%
1928	259	68.52%	119	31.48%	0	0.00%
1932	47	10.31%	398	87.28%	11	2.41%
1936	49	9.25%	476	89.81%	5	0.94%
1940	74	11.62%	560	87.91%	3	0.47%
1944	54	11.92%	363	80.13%	36	7.95%
1948	63	14.32%	366	83.18%	11	2.50%
1952	268	48.73%	282	51.27%	0	0.00%
1956	252	58.33%	178	41.20%	2	0.46%
1960	238	48.87%	246	50.51%	3	0.62%
1964	199	36.18%	351	63.82%	0	0.00%
1968	211	43.06%	187	38.16%	92	18.78%
1972	363	76.10%	111	23.27%	3	0.63%
1976	302	50.00%	297	49.17%	5	0.83%
1980	427	63.73%	239	35.67%	4	0.60%
1984	619	75.30%	199	24.21%	4	0.49%
1988	539	62.17%	326	37.60%	2	0.23%
1992	283	34.06%	256	30.81%	292	35.14%
1996	386	55.94%	213	30.87%	91	13.19%
2000	624	78.69%	162	20.43%	7	0.88%
2004	684	82.61%	141	17.03%	3	0.36%
2008	644	78.82%	164	20.07%	9	1.10%
2012	668	84.77%	112	14.21%	8	1.02%
2016	660	86.16%	90	11.75%	16	2.09%
2020	763	85.35%	120	13.42%	11	1.23%
2024	761	87.67%	105	12.10%	2	0.23%

United States Senate election results for Irion County, Texas1
Year	Republican		Democratic		Third party(ies)	
Year	No.	%	No.	%	No.	%
2024	732	84.43%	118	13.61%	17	1.96%

United States Senate election results for Irion County, Texas2
Year	Republican		Democratic		Third party(ies)	
Year	No.	%	No.	%	No.	%
2020	760	86.36%	111	12.61%	9	1.02%

Texas Gubernatorial election results for Irion County
Year	Republican		Democratic		Third party(ies)	
Year	No.	%	No.	%	No.	%
2022	618	88.92%	70	10.07%	7	1.01%

== Education ==
All of the county is in the Irion County Independent School District.

All of Irion County is in the service area of Howard County Junior College District.

== See also ==
- List of museums in West Texas
- National Register of Historic Places listings in Irion County, Texas
- Recorded Texas Historic Landmarks in Irion County
