= Charles S. Taylor =

Charles S. Taylor may refer to:

- Charles Stanfield Taylor (1808–1865), English-born pioneer
- Charles Simeon Taylor (1851–1913), American politician
- Charles Taylor (Conservative politician) (Charles Stuart Taylor, 1910–1989), English politician
