= 1992 United States presidential election in Texas =

- November 3, 1992
- Turnout: 72.92% (of registered voters) ▲47.64% (of voting age population)
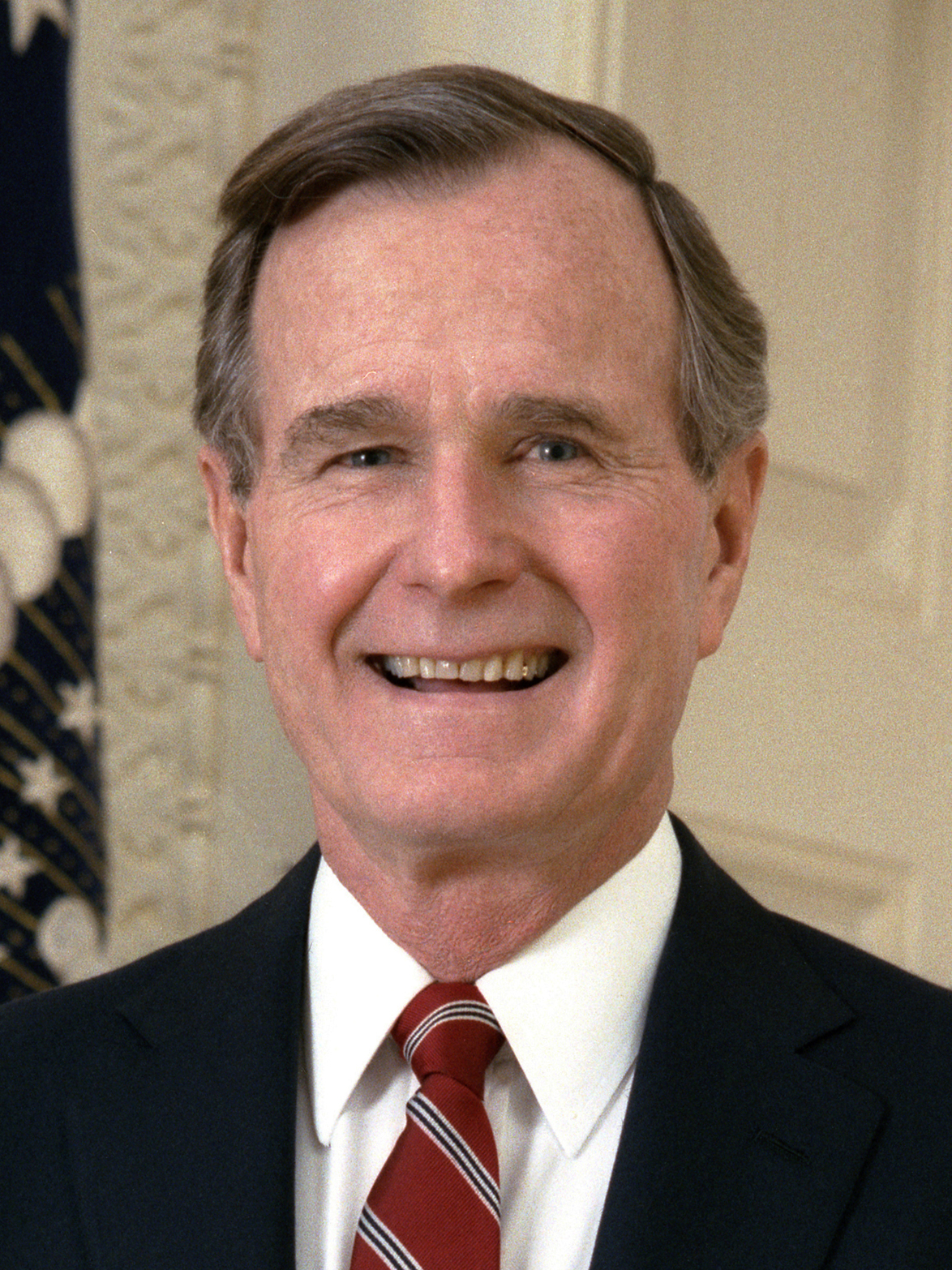

Nominee	George H. W. Bush	Bill Clinton	Ross Perot
Party	Republican	Democratic	Independent
Home state	Texas	Arkansas	Texas
Running mate	Dan Quayle	Al Gore	James Stockdale
Electoral vote	32	0	0
Popular vote	2,496,071	2,281,815	1,354,781
Percentage	40.56%	37.08%	22.01%

Bush
30–40%
40–50%
50–60%
60–70%
Clinton
30–40%
40–50%
50–60%
60–70%
70–80%
80–90%
Perot
30–40%
40–50%
President before election
George H. W. Bush
Republican
Elected President
Bill Clinton
Democratic

The 1992 United States presidential election in Texas took place on November 3, 1992, as part of the 1992 United States presidential election. Voters chose 32 representatives, or electors to the Electoral College, who voted for president and vice president.

Texas was won by incumbent President George H. W. Bush (R-Texas) with 40.56% of the popular vote over Governor Bill Clinton (D-Arkansas) with 37.08%. Businessman Ross Perot (I-Texas) finished in third, with 22.01% of the popular vote. Clinton ultimately won the national vote, defeating Bush. He thereby became the first Democrat to win a presidential election without Texas since its statehood in 1845. Despite Bush's ties to the state, this is the closest since 1976 that Texas has come to voting for a Democratic presidential candidate. It subsequently became a cornerstone of the Republican electoral coalition. 1992 was the first election in which Texas provided the Republican nominee with his largest raw vote margin in the nation, a distinction the state held in every subsequent election until 2020, when Texas's raw vote margin was exceeded by Tennessee's.

Texas was one of the few states in the U.S. where Ross Perot won any counties, namely Irion, Somervell, Grayson, and Loving. Perot was the first non-major party candidate to win any Texas counties since George Wallace in 1968. As of the 2024 presidential election, this is the last time these four aforementioned counties have not voted Republican, and the last time a non-major party candidate won any of Texas's counties. Loving County, which was the country's least populous in 1992, gave Perot his best performance in the country, earning 46.88% of the vote. In contrast, and more typically in modern American politics, Starr County was Clinton's strongest outside the District of Columbia, and one of only two to give him over 80% of the vote, the other being Macon County, Alabama, while the Panhandle counties of Hansford and Ochiltree were the third and fourth-strongest for Bush nationwide, behind the famous bastions of Jackson County, Kentucky, and Sioux County, Iowa.

The 1992 election marked the last time (through the 2024 election) that a Democratic presidential candidates carried any of the following counties: Crockett, Concho, McCulloch, Coleman, Mills, Throckmorton, Briscoe, Hill, Freestone, Henderson, Jack, Clay, Montague, Franklin, Lamar, Upshur, Angelina, Hardin, Liberty, Madison, Polk, San Jacinto, and Houston. Hays County, which Clinton won in 1992, would not vote Democratic again until 2020.

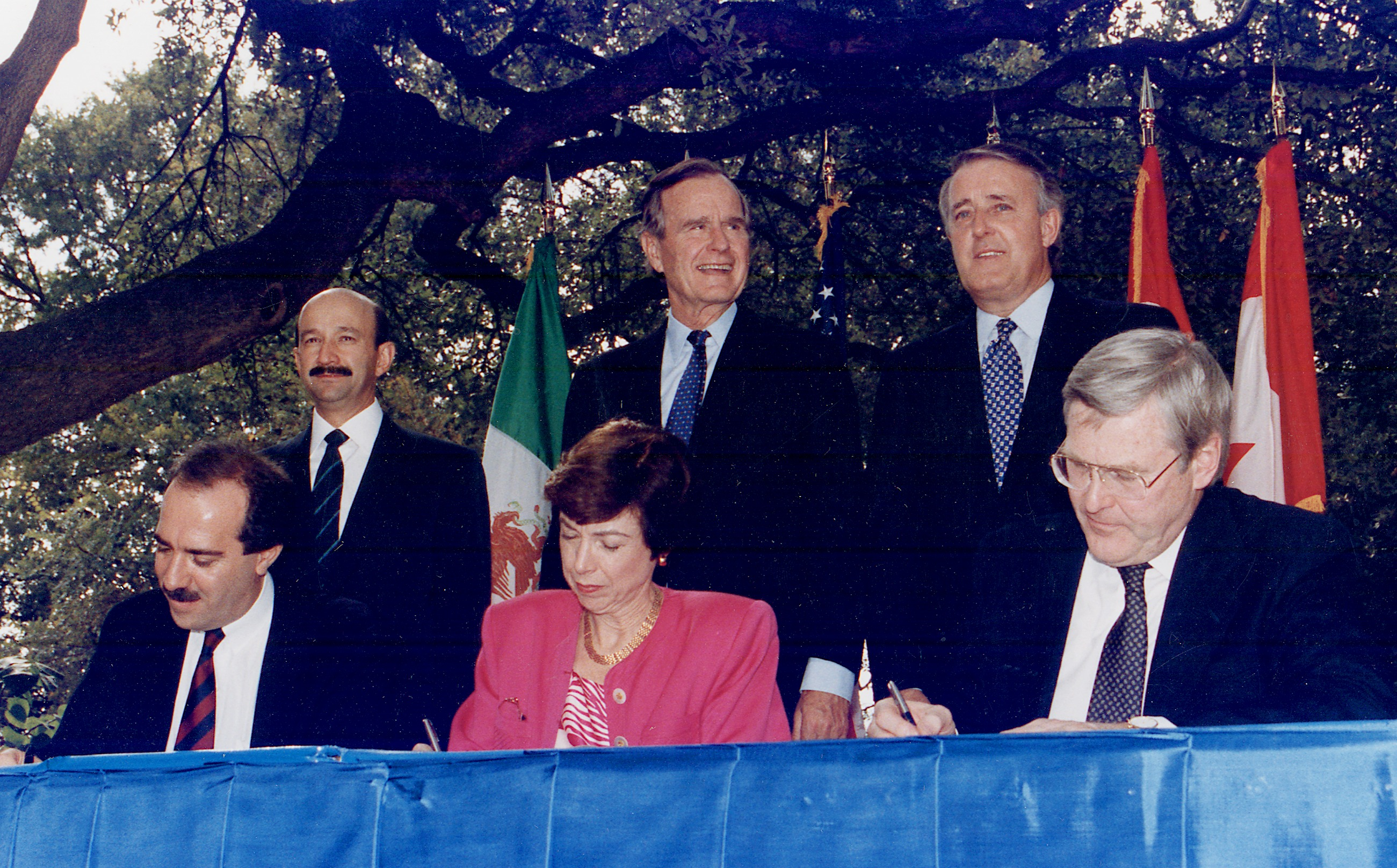
Bush at the controversial signing of the North American Free Trade Agreement (NAFTA), commenced in San Antonio, Texas on December 17, 1992. Signing was a critical international policy decision made by Bush one and a half months following his 1992 electoral defeat.

== Background ==
At this point in history no Democratic presidential nominee had won without also winning Texas.

The Democrats regained the Texas governorship with Ann Richards's victory in the 1990 election.

Texas was suffering economically due a collapse in the price of oil in the mid-1980s and taxes had been raised by the state legislature nearly every year since 1984.

== Primary ==
Richards served as permanent chair of the 1992 Democratic National Convention.

== Campaign ==
Garry Mauro was the chair of Clinton's campaign in Texas. James C. Oberwetter was the chair of Bush's campaign in Texas. The FBI conducted a sting operation against Oberwetter in order to determine the validity of Perot's allegations of the Republicans spying on him. A FBI agent offered to sell an audio tape and documents from Perot's office to Oberwetter for $2,500.

Ross Perot, who had not announced his campaign yet, qualified to appear on the ballot in Texas on May 27, 1992. He remained on the ballot despite dropping out. Polling by the Austin American-Statesman after Perot dropped out showed a majority of his supporters going to Clinton. After dropping out Perot was courted by the Republicans, using U.S. Senator Phil Gramm, and Democrats, using U.S. Senator Lloyd Bentsen. He reentered the race on October 1.

=== Polling ===
Poll source	Date(s) administered	Sample size	Margin of error	George Bush Republican	Bill Clinton Democratic	Ross Perot Independent	Andre Marrou Libertarian	Other / Undecided
The Dallas Morning News	October 19–22, 1992	1,071 LV	±3.5%	38%	36%	20%		6%
Houston Chronicle	October 20–22, 1992	703 RV	±4%	31%	39%	15%	1%	15%

== Results ==
1992 United States presidential election in Texas
Party	Candidate	Votes	Percentage	Electoral votes
Republican	George H. W. Bush (incumbent)	2,496,071	40.56%	32
Democratic	Bill Clinton	2,281,815	37.08%	0
Independent	Ross Perot	1,354,781	22.01%	0
Libertarian	Andre Marrou	19,699	0.32%	0
America First	James "Bo" Gritz (write-in)	505	0.01%	0
Taxpayers’	Howard Phillips (write-in)	359	0.01%	0
New Alliance Party	Lenora Fulani (write-in)	301	0.00%	0
Natural Law	John Hagelin (write-in)	217	0.00%	0
Democrats for Economic Recovery	Lyndon LaRouche (write-in)	169	0.00%	0
Independent	J. Quinn Brisben (write-in)	78	0.00%	0
Other write-ins		23	0.00%	0
Totals		6,154,018	100.0%	32

=== Results by county ===
County	George H. W. Bush Republican		Bill Clinton Democratic		Ross Perot Independent		Various candidates Other parties		Margin		Total votes cast
County	#	%	#	%	#	%	#	%	#	%	Total votes cast
Anderson	5,598	38.70%	5,322	36.79%	3,519	24.33%	27	0.19%	276	1.91%	14,466
Andrews	2,266	53.60%	1,081	25.57%	875	20.70%	6	0.14%	1,185	28.03%	4,228
Angelina	9,722	36.99%	10,318	39.26%	6,204	23.61%	37	0.14%	-596	-2.27%	26,281
Aransas	2,826	41.74%	2,246	33.18%	1,676	24.76%	22	0.32%	580	8.56%	6,770
Archer	1,560	39.32%	1,284	32.37%	1,106	27.88%	17	0.43%	276	6.95%	3,967
Armstrong	561	54.57%	278	27.04%	187	18.19%	2	0.19%	283	27.53%	1,028
Atascosa	3,806	39.41%	3,766	38.99%	2,035	21.07%	51	0.53%	40	0.42%	9,658
Austin	4,015	50.89%	2,278	28.87%	1,585	20.09%	12	0.15%	1,737	22.02%	7,890
Bailey	1,308	55.31%	677	28.63%	376	15.90%	4	0.17%	631	26.68%	2,365
Bandera	2,674	50.24%	1,059	19.90%	1,537	28.88%	52	0.98%	1,137 (Note: In this county where Perot ran ahead of Clinton, margin given is Bush vote minus Perot vote.)	21.36%	5,322
Bastrop	4,980	34.41%	6,252	43.19%	3,240	22.38%	2	0.01%	-1,272	-8.78%	14,474
Baylor	611	28.66%	990	46.44%	529	24.81%	2	0.09%	-379	-17.78%	2,132
Bee	3,633	39.89%	4,083	44.83%	1,367	15.01%	25	0.27%	-450	-4.94%	9,108
Bell	24,936	45.27%	18,684	33.92%	11,026	20.02%	431	0.78%	6,252	11.35%	55,077
Bexar	168,816	40.65%	172,513	41.54%	72,110	17.36%	1,837	0.44%	-3,697	-0.89%	415,276
Blanco	1,370	44.07%	891	28.66%	830	26.70%	18	0.58%	479	15.41%	3,109
Borden	184	48.68%	106	28.04%	87	23.02%	1	0.26%	78	20.64%	378
Bosque	2,300	35.44%	2,173	33.49%	1,999	30.81%	17	0.26%	127	1.95%	6,489
Bowie	11,776	38.78%	11,825	38.94%	6,659	21.93%	105	0.35%	-49	-0.16%	30,365
Brazoria	30,384	42.51%	21,861	30.59%	18,954	26.52%	268	0.37%	8,523	11.92%	71,467
Brazos	23,943	48.53%	14,819	30.03%	10,372	21.02%	206	0.42%	9,124	18.50%	49,340
Brewster	1,127	34.71%	1,383	42.59%	712	21.93%	25	0.77%	-256	-7.88%	3,247
Briscoe	360	37.62%	430	44.93%	164	17.14%	3	0.31%	-70	-7.31%	957
Brooks	585	15.54%	2,856	75.86%	318	8.45%	6	0.16%	-2,271	-60.32%	3,765
Brown	5,313	42.07%	4,264	33.76%	3,034	24.02%	19	0.15%	1,049	8.31%	12,630
Burleson	2,013	35.25%	2,511	43.97%	1,179	20.64%	8	0.14%	-498	-8.72%	5,711
Burnet	4,272	39.53%	3,638	33.66%	2,865	26.51%	32	0.30%	634	5.87%	10,807
Caldwell	2,749	32.95%	3,794	45.47%	1,776	21.28%	25	0.30%	-1,045	-12.52%	8,344
Calhoun	2,640	38.94%	2,550	37.62%	1,579	23.29%	10	0.15%	90	1.32%	6,779
Callahan	2,134	40.38%	1,694	32.05%	1,452	27.47%	5	0.09%	440	8.33%	5,285
Cameron	20,123	34.07%	29,435	49.84%	9,286	15.72%	213	0.36%	-9,312	-15.77%	59,057
Camp	1,219	30.63%	1,938	48.69%	821	20.63%	2	0.05%	-719	-18.06%	3,980
Carson	1,647	53.88%	825	26.99%	578	18.91%	7	0.23%	822	26.89%	3,057
Cass	3,999	34.30%	5,476	46.96%	2,168	18.59%	17	0.15%	-1,477	-12.66%	11,660
Castro	1,307	44.91%	1,113	38.25%	485	16.67%	5	0.17%	194	6.66%	2,910
Chambers	3,398	40.62%	2,832	33.85%	2,122	25.36%	14	0.17%	566	6.77%	8,366
Cherokee	5,847	41.36%	5,003	35.39%	3,273	23.15%	15	0.11%	844	5.97%	14,138
Childress	1,033	44.18%	881	37.68%	421	18.01%	3	0.13%	152	6.50%	2,338
Clay	1,586	32.30%	1,919	39.08%	1,397	28.45%	8	0.16%	-333	-6.78%	4,910
Cochran	750	51.33%	454	31.07%	255	17.45%	2	0.14%	296	20.26%	1,461
Coke	640	39.65%	580	35.94%	393	24.35%	1	0.06%	60	3.71%	1,614
Coleman	1,462	35.33%	1,579	38.16%	1,095	26.46%	2	0.05%	-117	-2.83%	4,138
Collin	60,514	46.97%	24,508	19.02%	43,287	33.60%	524	0.41%	17,227	13.37%	128,833
Collingsworth	697	43.56%	635	39.69%	265	16.56%	3	0.19%	62	3.87%	1,600
Colorado	3,286	45.88%	2,442	34.10%	1,421	19.84%	13	0.18%	844	11.78%	7,162
Comal	12,651	50.72%	6,312	25.31%	5,841	23.42%	137	0.55%	6,339	25.41%	24,941
Comanche	1,666	31.75%	2,296	43.75%	1,281	24.41%	5	0.10%	-630	-12.00%	5,248
Concho	414	33.50%	489	39.56%	329	26.62%	4	0.32%	-75	-6.06%	1,236
Cooke	5,299	40.50%	3,105	23.73%	4,658	35.60%	22	0.17%	641	4.90%	13,084
Coryell	6,144	42.93%	4,157	29.05%	3,974	27.77%	37	0.26%	1,987	13.88%	14,312
Cottle	245	23.90%	542	52.88%	235	22.93%	3	0.29%	-297	-28.98%	1,025
Crane	918	49.76%	514	27.86%	412	22.33%	1	0.05%	404	21.90%	1,845
Crockett	623	37.87%	653	39.70%	368	22.37%	1	0.06%	-30	-1.83%	1,645
Crosby	1,006	43.08%	1,010	43.25%	313	13.40%	6	0.26%	-4	-0.17%	2,335
Culberson	251	29.63%	424	50.06%	171	20.19%	1	0.12%	-173	-20.43%	847
Dallam	922	54.78%	434	25.79%	325	19.31%	2	0.12%	488	28.99%	1,683
Dallas	256,007	38.72%	231,412	35.00%	170,571	25.80%	3,262	0.49%	24,595	3.72%	661,252
Dawson	2,691	55.43%	1,639	33.76%	518	10.67%	7	0.14%	1,052	21.67%	4,855
Deaf Smith	3,137	56.43%	1,642	29.54%	772	13.89%	8	0.14%	1,495	26.89%	5,559
Delta	599	29.73%	864	42.88%	551	27.34%	1	0.05%	-265	-13.15%	2,015
Denton	48,492	41.60%	27,891	23.93%	39,653	34.01%	540	0.46%	8,839	7.59%	116,576
DeWitt	3,238	48.11%	2,127	31.60%	1,346	20.00%	19	0.28%	1,111	16.51%	6,730
Dickens	373	32.16%	536	46.21%	250	21.55%	1	0.09%	-163	-14.05%	1,160
Dimmit	844	19.27%	3,172	72.42%	361	8.24%	3	0.07%	-2,328	-53.15%	4,380
Donley	893	51.47%	578	33.31%	260	14.99%	4	0.23%	315	18.16%	1,735
Duval	698	13.86%	4,006	79.56%	326	6.47%	5	0.10%	-3,308	-65.70%	5,035
Eastland	2,830	38.87%	2,738	37.60%	1,698	23.32%	15	0.21%	92	1.27%	7,281
Ector	18,161	50.35%	11,130	30.85%	6,668	18.48%	114	0.32%	7,031	19.50%	36,073
Edwards	460	51.86%	254	28.64%	171	19.28%	2	0.23%	206	23.22%	887
Ellis	13,564	40.50%	9,537	28.47%	10,303	30.76%	91	0.27%	3,261	9.74%	33,495
El Paso	47,224	34.94%	67,715	50.10%	19,738	14.60%	486	0.36%	-20,491	-15.16%	135,163
Erath	3,835	36.77%	3,531	33.85%	3,046	29.20%	19	0.18%	304	2.92%	10,431
Falls	1,826	31.63%	2,761	47.83%	1,185	20.53%	1	0.02%	-935	-16.20%	5,773
Fannin	2,510	26.11%	4,164	43.31%	2,919	30.36%	22	0.23%	1,245 (Note: In this county where Perot ran ahead of Bush, margin given is Clinton vote minus Perot vote.)	12.95%	9,615
Fayette	3,789	42.94%	2,923	33.13%	2,088	23.67%	23	0.26%	866	9.81%	8,823
Fisher	539	24.22%	1,242	55.82%	442	19.87%	2	0.09%	-703	-31.60%	2,225
Floyd	1,676	55.70%	947	31.47%	385	12.79%	1	0.03%	729	24.23%	3,009
Foard	207	26.01%	435	54.65%	152	19.10%	2	0.25%	-228	-28.64%	796
Fort Bend	41,039	46.62%	29,992	34.07%	16,853	19.14%	147	0.17%	11,047	12.55%	88,031
Franklin	1,058	31.66%	1,338	40.04%	942	28.19%	4	0.12%	-280	-8.38%	3,342
Freestone	2,316	36.39%	2,445	38.41%	1,596	25.07%	8	0.13%	-129	-2.02%	6,365
Frio	1,275	29.52%	2,377	55.04%	654	15.14%	13	0.30%	-1,102	-25.52%	4,319
Gaines	2,138	54.36%	1,095	27.84%	696	17.70%	4	0.10%	1,043	26.52%	3,933
Galveston	31,303	34.69%	38,623	42.80%	20,103	22.28%	213	0.24%	-7,320	-8.11%	90,242
Garza	982	52.01%	558	29.56%	345	18.27%	3	0.16%	424	22.45%	1,888
Gillespie	4,712	56.28%	1,600	19.11%	2,018	24.10%	42	0.50%	2,694	32.18%	8,372
Glasscock	379	66.03%	100	17.42%	93	16.20%	2	0.35%	279	48.61%	574
Goliad	1,236	43.66%	1,069	37.76%	521	18.40%	5	0.18%	167	5.90%	2,831
Gonzales	2,502	45.02%	2,006	36.10%	1,018	18.32%	31	0.56%	496	8.92%	5,557
Gray	6,105	58.86%	2,426	23.39%	1,810	17.45%	31	0.30%	3,679	35.47%	10,372
Grayson	12,322	32.15%	12,547	32.73%	13,327	34.77%	136	0.35%	-780	-2.04%	38,332
Gregg	20,542	49.11%	12,797	30.59%	8,437	20.17%	53	0.13%	7,745	18.52%	41,829
Grimes	2,402	38.64%	2,594	41.72%	1,213	19.51%	8	0.13%	-192	-3.08%	6,217
Guadalupe	10,818	46.79%	6,567	28.40%	5,618	24.30%	117	0.51%	4,251	18.39%	23,120
Hale	6,098	59.59%	2,761	26.98%	1,357	13.26%	18	0.18%	3,337	32.61%	10,234
Hall	631	36.81%	819	47.78%	263	15.34%	1	0.06%	-188	-10.97%	1,714
Hamilton	1,232	37.80%	1,100	33.75%	921	28.26%	6	0.18%	132	4.05%	3,259
Hansford	1,660	69.08%	345	14.36%	398	16.56%	0	0.00%	1,262	52.52%	2,403
Hardeman	614	31.71%	954	49.28%	362	18.70%	6	0.31%	-340	-17.57%	1,936
Hardin	5,885	35.04%	6,753	40.21%	4,129	24.59%	26	0.15%	-868	-5.17%	16,793
Harris	406,778	43.14%	360,171	38.20%	172,922	18.34%	3,076	0.33%	46,607	4.94%	942,947
Harrison	8,733	38.50%	9,538	42.05%	4,371	19.27%	41	0.18%	-805	-3.55%	22,683
Hartley	1,081	60.16%	406	22.59%	308	17.14%	2	0.11%	675	37.57%	1,797
Haskell	852	29.86%	1,438	50.40%	562	19.70%	1	0.04%	-586	-20.54%	2,853
Hays	10,008	36.70%	10,842	39.76%	6,252	22.93%	165	0.61%	-834	-3.06%	27,267
Hemphill	989	58.18%	479	28.18%	232	13.65%	0	0.00%	510	30.00%	1,700
Henderson	8,368	34.49%	9,105	37.53%	6,746	27.81%	42	0.17%	-737	-3.04%	24,261
Hidalgo	26,976	30.60%	51,205	58.08%	9,757	11.07%	222	0.25%	-24,229	-27.48%	88,160
Hill	3,669	35.36%	3,929	37.87%	2,752	26.52%	26	0.25%	-260	-2.51%	10,376
Hockley	4,261	54.16%	2,301	29.25%	1,291	16.41%	15	0.19%	1,960	24.91%	7,868
Hood	5,313	37.52%	4,359	30.78%	4,457	31.47%	33	0.23%	856	6.05%	14,162
Hopkins	3,398	31.93%	4,085	38.38%	3,147	29.57%	13	0.12%	-687	-6.45%	10,643
Houston	3,067	38.24%	3,250	40.52%	1,690	21.07%	13	0.16%	-183	-2.28%	8,020
Howard	5,129	47.17%	3,735	34.35%	1,984	18.25%	25	0.23%	1,394	12.82%	10,873
Hudspeth	325	37.40%	364	41.89%	178	20.48%	2	0.23%	-39	-4.49%	869
Hunt	9,739	39.51%	7,452	30.23%	7,387	29.97%	72	0.29%	2,287	9.28%	24,650
Hutchinson	6,034	55.42%	2,833	26.02%	1,993	18.30%	28	0.26%	3,201	29.40%	10,888
Irion	283	34.06%	256	30.81%	290	34.90%	2	0.24%	-7	-0.84%	831
Jack	1,041	31.10%	1,254	37.47%	1,045	31.22%	7	0.21%	209	6.25%	3,347
Jackson	2,451	47.57%	1,722	33.42%	976	18.94%	3	0.06%	729	14.15%	5,152
Jasper	3,870	32.02%	5,658	46.81%	2,539	21.01%	20	0.17%	-1,788	-14.79%	12,087
Jeff Davis	360	41.10%	321	36.64%	187	21.35%	8	0.91%	39	4.46%	876
Jefferson	29,622	31.00%	48,405	50.66%	17,242	18.05%	274	0.29%	-18,783	-19.66%	95,543
Jim Hogg	478	22.65%	1,520	72.04%	107	5.07%	5	0.24%	-1,042	-49.39%	2,110
Jim Wells	3,311	26.36%	7,812	62.19%	1,413	11.25%	25	0.20%	-4,501	-35.83%	12,561
Johnson	13,473	36.22%	12,030	32.34%	11,573	31.11%	126	0.34%	1,443	3.88%	37,202
Jones	2,088	35.20%	2,400	40.46%	1,436	24.21%	8	0.13%	-312	-5.26%	5,932
Karnes	1,990	42.34%	1,897	40.36%	802	17.06%	11	0.23%	93	1.98%	4,700
Kaufman	6,578	34.51%	6,498	34.09%	5,913	31.02%	71	0.37%	80	0.42%	19,060
Kendall	4,162	56.60%	1,374	18.68%	1,773	24.11%	45	0.61%	2,389	32.49%	7,354
Kenedy	69	39.66%	87	50.00%	18	10.34%	0	0.00%	-18	-10.34%	174
Kent	175	28.69%	271	44.43%	163	26.72%	1	0.16%	-96	-15.74%	610
Kerr	8,787	53.72%	3,707	22.66%	3,790	23.17%	74	0.45%	4,997	30.55%	16,358
Kimble	790	48.98%	467	28.95%	354	21.95%	2	0.12%	323	20.03%	1,613
King	79	41.80%	54	28.57%	56	29.63%	0	0.00%	23	12.17%	189
Kinney	634	41.20%	598	38.86%	299	19.43%	8	0.52%	36	2.34%	1,539
Kleberg	3,897	36.89%	5,109	48.36%	1,470	13.92%	88	0.83%	-1,212	-11.47%	10,564
Knox	521	28.71%	854	47.05%	438	24.13%	2	0.11%	-333	-18.34%	1,815
Lamar	5,778	35.57%	6,328	38.96%	4,093	25.20%	44	0.27%	-550	-3.39%	16,243
Lamb	2,998	55.01%	1,737	31.87%	709	13.01%	6	0.11%	1,261	23.14%	5,450
Lampasas	2,233	43.07%	1,508	29.08%	1,432	27.62%	12	0.23%	725	13.99%	5,185
La Salle	586	25.27%	1,522	65.63%	211	9.10%	0	0.00%	-936	-40.36%	2,319
Lavaca	3,362	43.24%	2,700	34.72%	1,696	21.81%	18	0.23%	662	8.52%	7,776
Lee	2,108	41.68%	1,847	36.52%	1,088	21.51%	15	0.30%	261	5.16%	5,058
Leon	2,212	40.16%	2,042	37.07%	1,251	22.71%	3	0.05%	170	3.09%	5,508
Liberty	6,959	37.95%	7,036	38.37%	4,311	23.51%	33	0.18%	-77	-0.42%	18,339
Limestone	2,358	33.40%	3,188	45.16%	1,505	21.32%	9	0.13%	-830	-11.76%	7,060
Lipscomb	839	57.74%	338	23.26%	270	18.58%	6	0.41%	501	34.48%	1,453
Live Oak	1,805	45.52%	1,345	33.92%	806	20.33%	9	0.23%	460	11.60%	3,965
Llano	3,056	41.96%	2,409	33.08%	1,799	24.70%	19	0.26%	647	8.88%	7,283
Loving	31	32.29%	20	20.83%	45	46.88%	0	0.00%	-14	-14.59%	96
Lubbock	48,847	58.95%	22,240	26.84%	11,618	14.02%	153	0.18%	26,607	32.11%	82,858
Lynn	1,233	50.78%	902	37.15%	291	11.99%	2	0.08%	331	13.63%	2,428
McCulloch	1,108	31.74%	1,393	39.90%	986	28.24%	4	0.11%	-285	-8.16%	3,491
McLennan	28,473	40.67%	25,903	37.00%	15,505	22.14%	135	0.19%	2,570	3.67%	70,016
McMullen	274	61.85%	78	17.61%	89	20.09%	2	0.45%	185	41.76%	443
Madison	1,544	39.76%	1,553	39.99%	778	20.04%	8	0.21%	-9	-0.23%	3,883
Marion	1,245	29.03%	2,156	50.28%	882	20.57%	5	0.12%	-911	-21.25%	4,288
Martin	986	49.60%	641	32.24%	356	17.91%	5	0.25%	345	17.36%	1,988
Mason	776	45.06%	570	33.10%	364	21.14%	12	0.70%	206	11.96%	1,722
Matagorda	5,328	40.47%	4,759	36.15%	3,045	23.13%	33	0.25%	569	4.32%	13,165
Maverick	2,002	27.28%	4,540	61.86%	771	10.51%	26	0.35%	-2,538	-34.58%	7,339
Medina	4,912	45.54%	3,650	33.84%	2,167	20.09%	56	0.52%	1,262	11.70%	10,785
Menard	354	27.72%	553	43.30%	367	28.74%	3	0.23%	186	14.56%	1,277
Midland	24,143	58.39%	9,160	22.15%	7,880	19.06%	164	0.40%	14,983	36.24%	41,347
Milam	2,414	32.32%	3,542	47.43%	1,495	20.02%	17	0.23%	-1,128	-15.11%	7,468
Mills	702	35.28%	753	37.84%	530	26.63%	5	0.25%	-51	-2.56%	1,990
Mitchell	1,128	36.47%	1,353	43.74%	604	19.53%	8	0.26%	-225	-7.27%	3,093
Montague	2,304	30.61%	2,885	38.33%	2,330	30.96%	7	0.09%	555	7.37%	7,526
Montgomery	39,976	51.28%	18,551	23.80%	19,203	24.63%	228	0.29%	20,773	26.65%	77,958
Moore	3,147	57.24%	1,361	24.75%	976	17.75%	14	0.25%	1,786	32.49%	5,498
Morris	1,400	25.14%	3,028	54.37%	1,138	20.43%	3	0.05%	-1,628	-29.23%	5,569
Motley	446	54.46%	256	31.26%	117	14.29%	0	0.00%	190	23.20%	819
Nacogdoches	9,864	45.58%	6,937	32.05%	4,803	22.19%	39	0.18%	2,927	13.53%	21,643
Navarro	4,897	33.27%	6,006	40.80%	3,800	25.81%	18	0.12%	-1,109	-7.53%	14,721
Newton	1,212	22.00%	3,249	58.99%	1,032	18.74%	15	0.27%	-2,037	-36.99%	5,508
Nolan	1,993	33.48%	2,490	41.83%	1,455	24.45%	14	0.24%	-497	-8.35%	5,952
Nueces	36,781	36.49%	46,317	45.95%	17,374	17.24%	319	0.32%	-9,536	-9.46%	100,791
Ochiltree	2,419	68.06%	557	15.67%	576	16.21%	2	0.06%	1,843	51.85%	3,554
Oldham	583	59.07%	225	22.80%	177	17.93%	2	0.20%	358	36.27%	987
Orange	9,793	30.14%	15,305	47.11%	7,321	22.53%	71	0.22%	-5,512	-16.97%	32,490
Palo Pinto	2,852	30.75%	3,392	36.57%	3,010	32.45%	21	0.23%	382	4.12%	9,275
Panola	3,473	37.22%	3,950	42.33%	1,906	20.42%	3	0.03%	-477	-5.11%	9,332
Parker	10,321	37.54%	7,934	28.86%	9,148	33.27%	91	0.33%	1,173	4.27%	27,494
Parmer	1,829	60.30%	637	21.00%	564	18.60%	3	0.10%	1,192	39.30%	3,033
Pecos	1,836	40.59%	1,778	39.31%	895	19.79%	14	0.31%	58	1.28%	4,523
Polk	5,390	37.81%	5,942	41.69%	2,884	20.23%	38	0.27%	-552	-3.88%	14,254
Potter	13,510	48.64%	9,527	34.30%	4,655	16.76%	83	0.30%	3,983	14.34%	27,775
Presidio	400	21.15%	1,189	62.88%	290	15.34%	12	0.63%	-789	-41.73%	1,891
Rains	975	32.69%	1,108	37.14%	890	29.84%	10	0.34%	-133	-4.45%	2,983
Randall	24,971	61.60%	9,119	22.50%	6,340	15.64%	107	0.26%	15,852	39.10%	40,537
Reagan	651	52.08%	337	26.96%	259	20.72%	3	0.24%	314	25.12%	1,250
Real	787	47.99%	463	28.23%	386	23.54%	4	0.24%	324	19.76%	1,640
Red River	1,735	30.68%	2,686	47.50%	1,228	21.72%	6	0.11%	-951	-16.82%	5,655
Reeves	1,244	27.30%	2,569	56.37%	734	16.11%	10	0.22%	-1,325	-29.07%	4,557
Refugio	1,469	39.36%	1,531	41.02%	716	19.19%	16	0.43%	-62	-1.66%	3,732
Roberts	391	63.37%	126	20.42%	99	16.05%	1	0.16%	265	42.95%	617
Robertson	1,707	30.46%	2,927	52.23%	963	17.18%	7	0.12%	-1,220	-21.77%	5,604
Rockwall	6,427	48.44%	2,397	18.06%	4,393	33.11%	52	0.39%	2,034	15.33%	13,269
Runnels	1,653	38.09%	1,401	32.28%	1,279	29.47%	7	0.16%	252	5.81%	4,340
Rusk	7,560	45.61%	5,391	32.53%	3,575	21.57%	48	0.29%	2,169	13.08%	16,574
Sabine	1,490	31.85%	2,288	48.91%	894	19.11%	6	0.13%	-798	-17.06%	4,678
San Augustine	1,243	34.06%	1,737	47.60%	667	18.28%	2	0.05%	-494	-13.54%	3,649
San Jacinto	2,494	35.57%	2,846	40.59%	1,653	23.58%	18	0.26%	-352	-5.02%	7,011
San Patricio	7,456	39.48%	8,202	43.43%	3,178	16.83%	51	0.27%	-746	-3.95%	18,887
San Saba	723	34.38%	716	34.05%	660	31.38%	4	0.19%	7	0.33%	2,103
Schleicher	452	36.72%	420	34.12%	355	28.84%	4	0.32%	32	2.60%	1,231
Scurry	2,670	43.62%	1,609	26.29%	1,826	29.83%	16	0.26%	844	13.79%	6,121
Shackelford	623	40.64%	484	31.57%	422	27.53%	4	0.26%	139	9.07%	1,533
Shelby	3,217	36.96%	3,986	45.79%	1,487	17.08%	15	0.17%	-769	-8.83%	8,705
Sherman	851	62.16%	261	19.07%	256	18.70%	1	0.07%	590	43.09%	1,369
Smith	27,753	47.03%	17,514	29.68%	13,569	23.00%	170	0.29%	10,239	17.35%	59,006
Somervell	872	33.96%	782	30.45%	903	35.16%	11	0.43%	-31	-1.20%	2,568
Starr	1,209	13.05%	7,668	82.80%	345	3.73%	39	0.42%	-6,459	-69.75%	9,261
Stephens	1,573	41.88%	1,115	29.69%	1,062	28.27%	6	0.16%	458	12.19%	3,756
Sterling	322	50.79%	127	20.03%	182	28.71%	3	0.47%	140	22.08%	634
Stonewall	242	21.51%	561	49.87%	322	28.62%	0	0.00%	239	21.25%	1,125
Sutton	687	42.99%	524	32.79%	387	24.22%	0	0.00%	163	10.20%	1,598
Swisher	989	33.54%	1,413	47.91%	541	18.35%	6	0.20%	-424	-14.37%	2,949
Tarrant	183,387	38.90%	156,230	33.14%	129,998	27.58%	1,781	0.38%	27,157	5.76%	471,396
Taylor	22,614	49.75%	12,382	27.24%	10,331	22.73%	127	0.28%	10,232	22.51%	45,454
Terrell	176	27.89%	325	51.51%	128	20.29%	2	0.32%	-149	-23.62%	631
Terry	2,309	52.54%	1,461	33.24%	619	14.08%	6	0.14%	848	19.30%	4,395
Throckmorton	389	38.21%	401	39.39%	228	22.40%	0	0.00%	-12	-1.18%	1,018
Titus	3,024	34.32%	3,625	41.15%	2,146	24.36%	15	0.17%	-601	-6.83%	8,810
Tom Green	14,989	40.80%	11,437	31.13%	10,244	27.88%	69	0.19%	3,552	9.67%	36,739
Travis	88,105	31.89%	130,546	47.26%	56,158	20.33%	1,426	0.52%	-42,441	-15.37%	276,235
Trinity	1,988	33.64%	2,784	47.11%	1,133	19.17%	4	0.07%	-796	-13.47%	5,909
Tyler	2,357	32.02%	3,465	47.08%	1,529	20.77%	9	0.12%	-1,108	-15.06%	7,360
Upshur	4,511	36.95%	4,776	39.12%	2,896	23.72%	25	0.20%	-265	-2.17%	12,208
Upton	908	51.71%	489	27.85%	313	17.82%	46	2.62%	419	23.86%	1,756
Uvalde	3,635	42.55%	3,482	40.76%	1,387	16.24%	39	0.46%	153	1.79%	8,543
Val Verde	4,102	37.30%	4,748	43.18%	2,093	19.03%	53	0.48%	-646	-5.88%	10,996
Van Zandt	5,810	35.44%	5,310	32.39%	5,239	31.95%	37	0.23%	500	3.05%	16,396
Victoria	13,086	50.26%	7,604	29.20%	5,136	19.73%	211	0.81%	5,482	21.06%	26,037
Walker	6,662	41.84%	5,619	35.29%	3,619	22.73%	24	0.15%	1,043	6.55%	15,924
Waller	3,065	33.84%	4,270	47.14%	1,692	18.68%	31	0.34%	-1,205	-13.30%	9,058
Ward	1,769	40.00%	1,695	38.33%	948	21.44%	10	0.23%	74	1.67%	4,422
Washington	5,817	53.60%	3,283	30.25%	1,738	16.01%	15	0.14%	2,534	23.35%	10,853
Webb	7,789	31.32%	14,509	58.35%	2,517	10.12%	51	0.21%	-6,720	-27.03%	24,866
Wharton	5,503	43.00%	4,643	36.28%	2,624	20.50%	27	0.21%	860	6.72%	12,797
Wheeler	1,458	52.69%	938	33.90%	367	13.26%	4	0.14%	520	18.79%	2,767
Wichita	17,956	38.53%	17,021	36.52%	11,478	24.63%	153	0.33%	935	2.01%	46,608
Wilbarger	1,959	36.69%	1,924	36.03%	1,453	27.21%	4	0.07%	35	0.66%	5,340
Willacy	1,490	27.04%	3,359	60.96%	652	11.83%	9	0.16%	-1,869	-33.92%	5,510
Williamson	26,208	42.79%	19,437	31.73%	15,415	25.17%	194	0.32%	6,771	11.06%	61,254
Wilson	3,766	39.13%	3,711	38.56%	2,105	21.87%	43	0.45%	55	0.57%	9,625
Winkler	1,173	43.41%	942	34.86%	582	21.54%	5	0.19%	231	8.55%	2,702
Wise	4,555	33.57%	4,478	33.00%	4,485	33.06%	50	0.37%	70	0.51%	13,568
Wood	4,708	38.22%	4,084	33.15%	3,494	28.36%	32	0.26%	624	5.07%	12,318
Yoakum	1,486	57.71%	595	23.11%	484	18.80%	10	0.39%	891	34.60%	2,575
Young	2,894	37.71%	2,464	32.10%	2,302	29.99%	15	0.20%	430	5.61%	7,675
Zapata	866	26.65%	2,052	63.16%	326	10.03%	5	0.15%	-1,186	-36.51%	3,249
Zavala	571	14.76%	3,058	79.06%	237	6.13%	2	0.05%	-2,487	-64.30%	3,868
Totals	2,496,071	40.56%	2,281,815	37.08%	1,354,781	22.01%	21,351	0.35%	214,256	3.48%	6,154,018

==== Counties that flipped from Democratic to Republican ====
- Calhoun
- Karnes
- Lee
- San Saba

==== Counties that flipped from Republican to Democratic ====
- Angelina
- Bee
- Bexar
- Bowie
- Brewster
- Coleman
- Crockett
- Freestone
- Grimes
- Harrison
- Hays
- Henderson
- Hill
- Jack
- Jones
- Lamar
- Liberty
- Madison
- Mills
- Palo Pinto
- Panola
- Refugio
- Upshur
- Val Verde

==== Counties that flipped from Republican to Independent ====
- Grayson
- Irion
- Loving
- Somervell

== See also ==
- United States presidential elections in Texas
- Presidency of Bill Clinton

== Works cited ==
- Abramson, Paul; Aldrich, John; Rohde, David (1995). Change and Continuity in the 1992 Elections. CQ Press. ISBN 0871878399.
- Steed, Robert; Moreland, Laurence; Baker, Tod, eds. (1994). The 1992 Presidential Election in the South: Current Patterns of Southern Party and Electoral Politics. Praeger Publishers. ISBN 0275945340.
