= Texas State Highway 163 =

State highway in Texas

State Highway 163
- SH 163 highlighted in red

Route information
- Maintained by TxDOT
- Length: 203.109 mi (326.872 km)
- Existed: 1930–present

Major junctions
- South end: US 90 at Comstock
- I-10 at Ozona; US 190; US 67 at Barnhart; US 87 at Sterling City
- North end: I-20 BL at Colorado City

Location
- Country: United States
- State: Texas

Highway system
- Highways in Texas; Interstate; US; State; Former; Toll; Loops; Spurs; FM/RM; Park; Rec
← SH 162	→ SH 164

State Highway 163 (SH 163) is a 203-mile-long (327 km) state highway in the western part of Texas, United States.

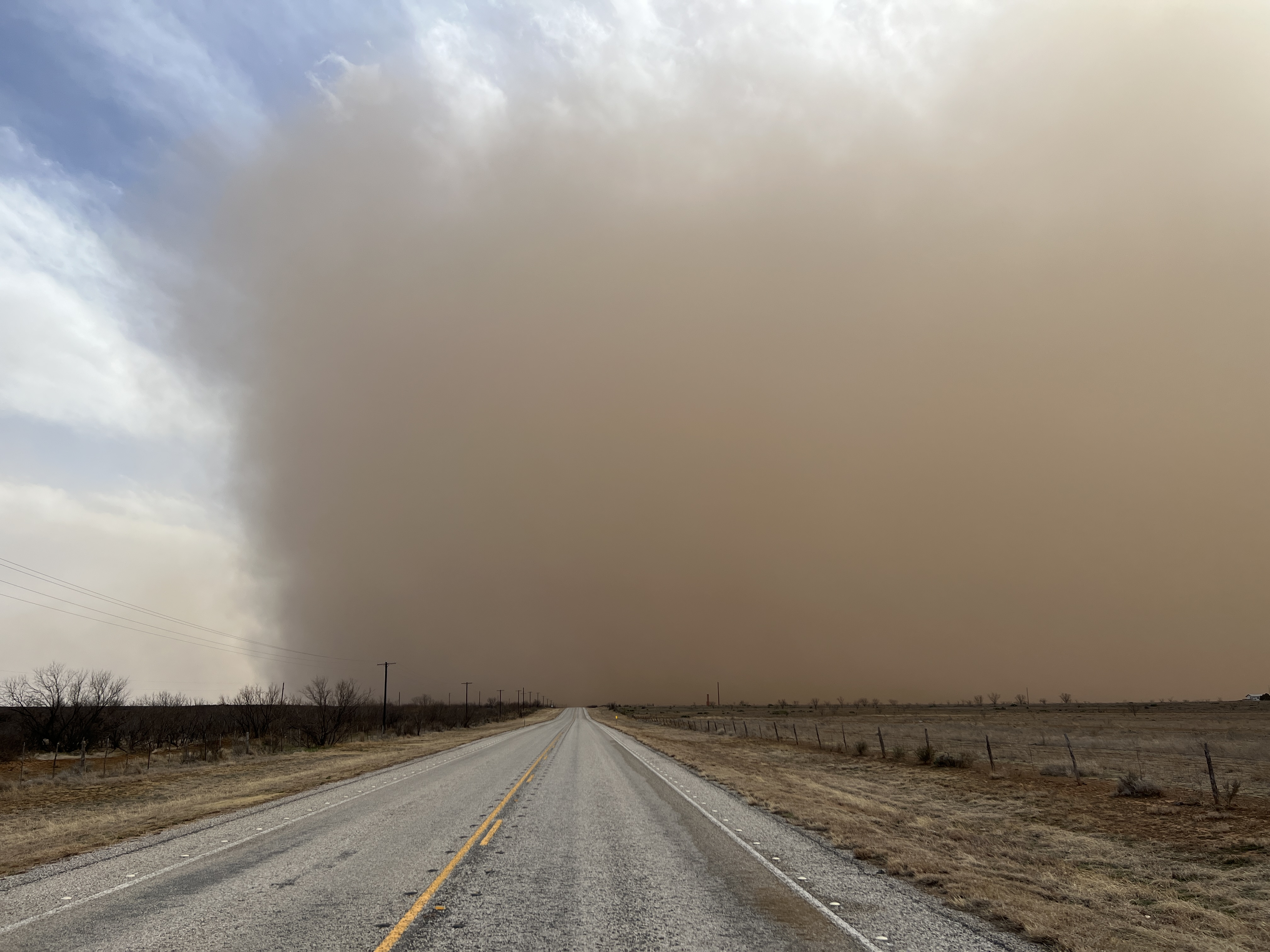
Dust cloud crossing Texas State Highway 163

== Route description ==
SH 163 runs almost directly north from its originating junction with U.S. Highway 90 at Comstock near the Rio Grande, the southern border of the state. The road passes east of the Seminole Canyon State Historical Park and along the Devils River to the ghost town of Juno. The highway continues north to Ozona at Interstate 10 and to Barnhart, where it junctions with U.S. Highway 67, and on to Sterling City. The highway is co-routed with U.S. Highway 87 at Sterling City, but then diverges after a few miles to continue northward to Colorado City and a final junction with Interstate 20 Business Loop (former U.S. Highway 80).

Counties traversed by the highway include Val Verde, Crockett, Irion, Tom Green, Sterling, and Mitchell. Most of the terrain covered by the highway is sparsely populated ranch country.

== History ==
The original formation of the highway on February 26, 1930 (numbered on March 19, 1930) included only the section from Ozona to Barnhart. On January 18, 1937, SH 163 extended south to Comstock. On September 27, 1957, SH 101 and FM 379 (erroneously shown as RM 379 in the SH 163 designation file) were cancelled and combined into the additional sections of SH 163 from Barnhart to Colorado City.

== Major intersections ==
County	Location	mi	km	Destinations	Notes
Val Verde	Comstock	0.00	0.00	US 90 / Phillips Street – Del Rio, Sanderson	Southern terminus
Val Verde		41.3	66.5	RM 189 east	
Crockett		67.1	108.0	RM 1973 south	
Crockett	Ozona	81.6	131.3	I-10 – Fort Stockton, El Paso, Sonora	I-10 exit 365
Crockett	Ozona	82.0	132.0	Loop 466 (11th Street)	
Crockett		84.8	136.5	SH 137 north – Big Lake	
Crockett		96.2	154.8	US 190 – Iraan, Eldorado	
Irion	Barnhart	111.3	179.1	US 67 (Reagan Street) – Big Lake, San Angelo	
Irion		123.5	198.8	RM 2469 east – Mertzon	
Tom Green	No major junctions				
Sterling		156.5	251.9	RM 2139 south	
Sterling	Sterling City	163.0	262.3	US 87 south / SH 158 east (4th Street) – San Angelo, Robert Lee	South end of US 87/SH 158 overlap
Sterling		165.8	266.8	SH 158 west – Midland	Interchange; north end of SH 158 overlap
Sterling		166.7	268.3	US 87 north – Big Spring	North end of US 87 overlap
Mitchell		188.5	303.4	FM 2183 west	
Mitchell		193.2	310.9	FM 670 north – Westbrook	
Mitchell		200.2	322.2	FM 2836 north – Lake Colorado City	
Mitchell		203.4	327.3	FM 1229 north	
Mitchell		205.4	330.6	FM 1983 north	
Mitchell	Colorado City	207.0	333.1	I-20 BL (2nd Street) to Bus. SH 208 – Big Spring, Sweetwater, Snyder	Northern terminus; road continues as Chestnut Street
1.000 mi = 1.609 km; 1.000 km = 0.621 mi: Concurrency terminus
