= John Goodwin Tower Center for Political Studies =

Think tank in Texas, USA

The John Goodwin Tower Center for Political Studies is an American think tank based in Dallas, Texas, and now associated with Southern Methodist University. The primary mission of the Tower Center is to promote the study of politics and international affairs and to stimulate an interest in ethical public service among undergraduates. The Tower Center is an academic center where all parties and views are heard in a marketplace of ideas, and the Center pursues its mission in a non-partisan manner.

== Medal of Freedom ==
The Medal of Freedom is the highest honor the Tower Center bestows. It is awarded in recognition of extraordinary contributions to the advancement of democratic ideals and to the security, prosperity and welfare of humanity. Recipients include:

- Former Secretary of State and Chairman of the Joint Chiefs, General Colin Powell (1997)
- Former Prime Minister of Great Britain, Lady Margaret Thatcher (1999)
- The 41st President of the United States, George H. W. Bush (2001)
- General Tommy Franks (2003)
- Senator John McCain (2006)
- Prime Minister Tony Blair (2008)
- The 43rd President of the United States, George W. Bush and the Former First Lady Laura Bush (2010)
- Former Secretary of State and Secretary of the Treasury, James A. Baker (2012)

== Board of directors ==
- Dan Branch, Chair
- Robert W. Jordan, Vice-chair
- Hugh C. Akin
- Hunter L. Hunt
- Jan Hart Black
- Jan Rees-Jones
- Frederick Bush
- Gene Jones
- Felix Chen
- Brad E. Cheves, ex officio
- Cary M. Maguire
- Richard Collins
- Nancy Cain Marcus
- Penny Tower Cook
- Fred Meyer
- Brad O’Leary
- Jeanne Tower Cox
- Pat Patterson
- Thomas M. Dunning
- Rena Pederson
- Robert A. Estrada
- Sarah Perot
- Alan Feld
- Jeanne L. Phillips
- Richard W. Fisher
- Joe H. Staley, Jr.
- Darab Ganji
- William M. Tsutsui, ex officio
- Jerome Garza
- Jack C. Vaughn
- Linda Gibbons
- Roger Wallace
- Joseph M. Grant
- Ray Washburne
- Nancy Halbreich
- Jane Wetzel
- Karen Hughes
- Charles Wyly
- James F. Hollifield, ex officio

== Honorary Board of Directors ==
- Howard Baker
- William L. Ball III
- George W. Bush
- William Cohen
- J. French Hill
- Kay Bailey Hutchison
- Samuel R. Johnson
- Tom Loeffler
- John McCain
- Frederick D. McClure
- Dr. Nicholas Rostow
- Carole Keeton Strayhorn
