= Judy Feld Carr =

Canadian musicologist and human rights activist

Judy Feld Carr, CM
- Born: Judith Feld; December 26, 1938 (age 87); Montreal, Quebec, Canada
- Education: University of Toronto (B.Mus., M.Mus.)
- Occupations: Musicologist, human rights activist
- Known for: Rescuing 3,228 Jews from Baathist Syria (1970s–2001)
- Spouse: Ronald Feld (m. 1960; died 1973) Donald Carr (m. 1977; died 2024)
- Children: 6 (three with Feld; three stepchildren with Carr)
- Awards: Member of the Order of Canada; Presidential Medal of Distinction (Israel); others

Judith "Judy" Feld Carr, CM, (born December 26, 1938) is a Canadian musicologist and human rights activist. Between the early 1970s and 2001, she was involved in efforts to facilitate the emigration of more than 3,000 Jews from Baathist Syria. The initiative involved raising funds and negotiating exits for individuals and families, often under restrictive conditions.

== Early life and education ==
Feld Carr was born in Montreal and raised in Sudbury, Ontario. She attended the University of Toronto, where she earned a Bachelor of Music in music education and a Master of Music in musicology. She also completed specialist certification in instrumental and vocal music at the Ontario College of Education.

In 1960, she married Dr. Ronald Feld, a medical resident. The couple settled in Toronto and had three children together. Feld Carr taught music in Toronto high schools and later became a lecturer in musicology at several institutions, including Yeshiva University in New York City and the Hebrew University of Jerusalem. She was also active in the Toronto Jewish community, serving as the first female president of the Beth Tzedec Congregation in 1982–83.

== Rescue of Syrian Jews ==
In 1972, Feld Carr and her husband became involved in raising awareness about the treatment of Jews in Syria after reading about the deaths of individuals attempting to cross the border. They began sending parcels containing religious materials to communities in Syria, which served as a form of communication and support. Using coded correspondence, they established a secret line of communication with Rabbi Ibrahim Hamra, the Chief Rabbi of Syria, and others within the Syrian Jewish community.

Following Ronald Feld's death in 1973, the Dr. Ronald Feld Fund for Jews in Arab Lands was established at Toronto’s Beth Tzedec Synagogue, in his memory to support related humanitarian work. Feld Carr continued coordinating emigration efforts, often working through private networks and intermediaries. This included negotiating with Syrian officials and arranging third-country routes, sometimes involving bribes or logistical support.

According to published accounts, she facilitated the departure of individuals and families under various pretexts, such as medical visits or family emergencies, with the understanding that they would not return. These activities were conducted privately and without direct government sponsorship. She maintained contacts with Syrian community members and worked with diaspora organizations to sustain the initiative.

Using funds gathered privately from the Canadian Jewish community, Feld Carr paid ransoms to Syrian authorities for prisoners and exit visas, and when bribery failed, she coordinated smuggling routes through neighboring countries. Each rescue was arranged individually and often entailed complex logistics and negotiations. By the early 1980s, she had established an underground network of contacts inside Syria, comprising Jews as well as sympathetic Muslims and Christians, who assisted in relaying information and facilitating escapes.

In 1992, the Baathist Syrian government permitted the remaining Jews to emigrate on the condition that they not move to Israel. Feld Carr worked to help arrange the emigration of as many people as possible while the opportunity existed. In total, from the 1970s until the operation’s end in 2001, Feld Carr’s efforts brought 3,228 Jews out of Syria, and safely resettled them in Israel, North America, and other destinations.

Throughout this period, Feld Carr was also involved in advocacy on behalf of Syrian Jewry in the public arena. She chaired the Canadian Jewish Congress’s National Task Force for Syrian Jewry, using her position to raise awareness of the human rights abuses facing Syrian Jews and to lobby the Canadian government for assistance.

Throughout the operation, those in the Syrian Jewish community who knew of the rescues referred to their benefactor only as "Mrs. Judy in Canada," often without ever learning her full name. Extreme secrecy was maintained to protect all involved, as any public exposure could have endangered lives and shut down the escape route. Over time, Feld Carr became the central coordinator of what has been described as "the best-kept secret in the Jewish world" of that era.

== Awards and recognition ==
In June 2012, Feld Carr was one of the first six recipients of The Presidential Award of Distinction of the State of Israel. The Award was created by President Shimon Peres earlier that year, in order to "recognize outstanding contribution to the Jewish People and the State of Israel".

Feld Carr has received numerous other awards, including:

- The Order of Canada, 2001
- Co-honouree of the Jewish National Fund Negev Dinner, Toronto, 1993
- Honorary Award, United Association of Israelis of Syrian Origin, Israel, 1995
- The Saul Hayes Human Rights Award of the Canadian Jewish Congress, 1995
- The University of Haifa Humanitarian Award of Merit, 1996
- The Simon Wiesenthal Centre Medal of Valor, 2001
- The Abram Sachar Medal as "Woman of the Year", Brandeis University, 2002
- The Queen's Golden Jubilee Medal in 2002
- The Simon Wiesenthal Award for Tolerance, Justice and Human Rights, 2002
- Dr Jane Evans Pursuit of Justice Award of Women of Reform Judaism of North America, 2009
- Co-honouree of the Human Rights Award of the Canadian Centre for Diversity, 2011
- The Queen Elizabeth II Diamond Jubilee Medal in 2012

She has received the honorary degree of Doctor of Laws from Laurentian University in 2000 and the honorary degree of Doctor of Humane Letters from the Jewish Theological Seminary, New York in 2002.

== Publications and media ==
The account of Feld Carr’s activities has been documented in several sources. A biography by Harold Troper was published in 1999 under the title The Ransomed of God: The Remarkable Story Of One Woman's Role in the Rescue of Syrian Jews, republished by Lester, Mason & Begg under the title The Rescuer: The Amazing True Story of How One Woman Helped Save the Jews of Syria. A documentary film titled Miss Judy aired on Israeli television in 2011 and was later shown at Canadian film festivals.

== Personal life ==
Feld Carr lives in Toronto. She has three children from her first marriage (including finance executive Alan Feld) and three stepchildren from her second marriage to Donald Carr, a Canadian lawyer and Jewish communal leader.

== See also ==
- Jewish community of Toronto
