= Robert W. Jordan =

American diplomat

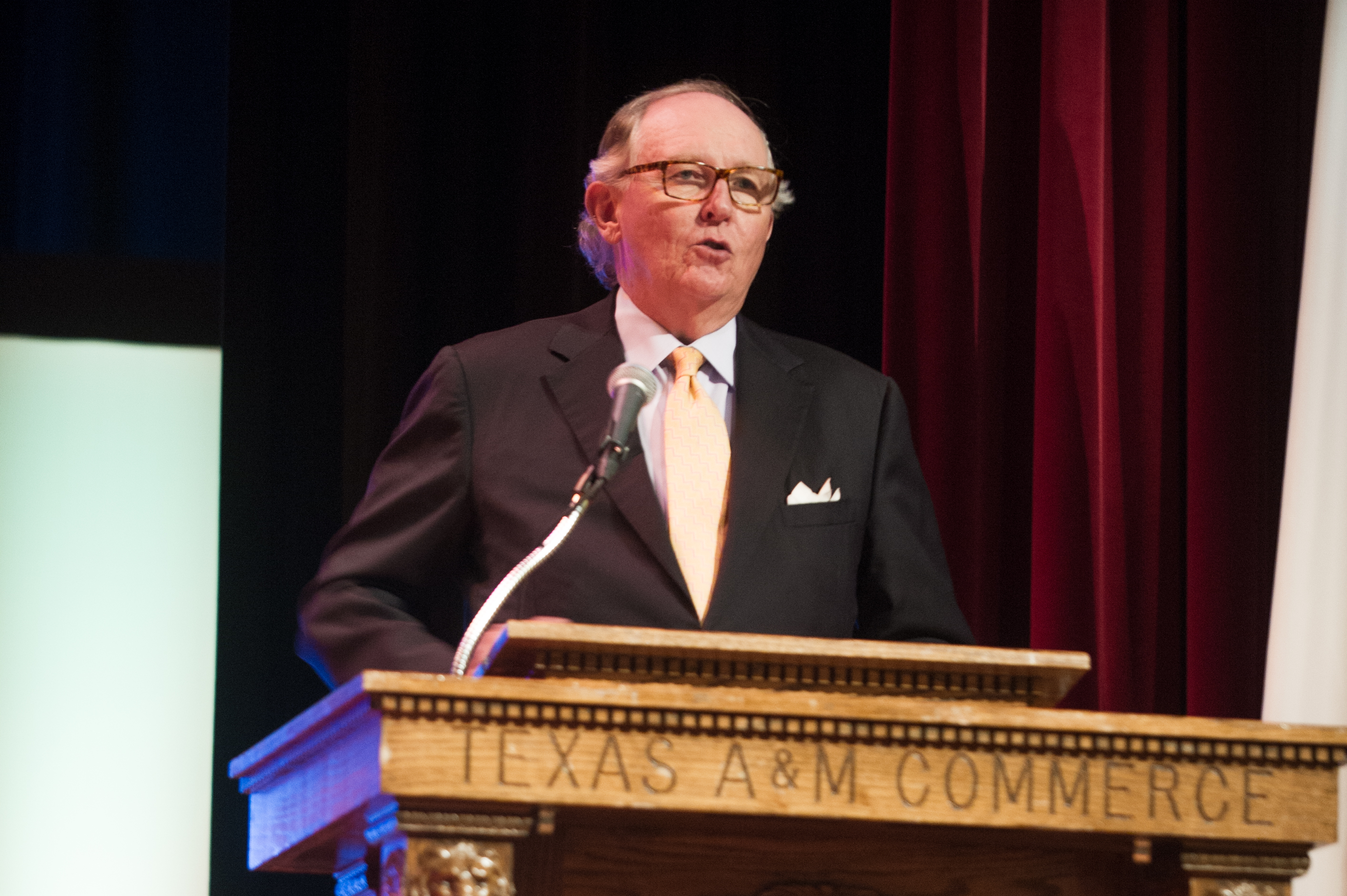
- Robert W. Jordan speaking at Texas A&M University–Commerce in March 2015

19th United States Ambassador to Saudi Arabia
- In office June 30, 2002 – October 13, 2003
- President: George W. Bush
- Preceded by: Wyche Fowler
- Succeeded by: James C. Oberwetter

Personal details
- Born: October 9, 1945 (age 80)
- Education: Duke University (BA); University of Maryland, College Park (MA); University of Oklahoma College of Law (JD)
- Occupation: Lawyer, diplomat, professor

Robert W. Jordan (born October 9, 1945) is an American lawyer and diplomat. He served as the United States Ambassador to Saudi Arabia from 2002 to 2003, under President George W. Bush.

== Biography ==
=== Early life ===
Jordan received his B.A. degree from Duke University in 1967, his M.A. from the University of Maryland, College Park in 1971 while serving in the U.S. Navy, and his J.D. from the University of Oklahoma College of Law in 1974.

=== Career ===
Jordan was a partner in the Dallas, Texas office of Baker Botts, the law firm of James Baker. In the early 1990s, he represented George W. Bush in the investigation by the U.S. Securities and Exchange Commission into possible insider trading in Bush's sale of stock in Harken Energy. Jordan was the president of the Dallas Bar Association in 1999.

In 2001, Bush, who had become President of the United States, appointed Jordan as Ambassador to Saudi Arabia. He held that post from June 2002 through October 2003. When Jordan resigned his ambassadorship, he returned to Baker Botts and is currently a senior partner of the firm. Jordan is currently partner-in-charge of the firm's Middle East offices and divides his time between Dubai and the United States.

Jordan is a member of the American Arbitration Association Commercial Panel of Arbitrators, the National Panel of Distinguished Neutrals of the CPR International Institute for Conflict Prevention & Resolution, and The London Court of International Arbitration. A member of the Council on Foreign Relations, he serves as president of the Dallas Committee on Foreign Relations and as vice chairman of the board of directors of the John Goodwin Tower Center for Political Studies at Southern Methodist University. Jordan also serves on the executive committee of the board of directors of the Center for American and International Law and the advisory board of the center's Institute for Transnational Arbitration.

Jordan serves as Diplomat in Residence and adjunct professor of political science at Southern Methodist University, where he teaches a course on the Middle East. In 2007, he received the Fellows Award presented by the Dallas Bar Foundation.

Diplomatic posts
| Preceded by Wyche Fowler, Jr. | United States Ambassador to Saudi Arabia; 2002–2003 | Succeeded by James C. Oberwetter |
