= Robert Anderson Irion =

American politician (1804–1861)

Robert Anderson Irion (July 7, 1804 – March 2, 1861) was a medical doctor, surveyor and politician who served as Secretary of State of Texas under Sam Houston's first presidency of the Republic of Texas.

== Early life ==
Irion was born in Paris, Tennessee, in 1804 to John Poindexter Irion and Maacha (White) Irion. He was trained as physician graduating from Transylvania University in Lexington, Kentucky, in March, 1826. He began practicing medicine in Vicksburg, Mississippi. In 1832, following the death of his first wife, Ann Vick, he moved to Texas, first practicing medicine in San Augustine. He subsequently moved to Nacogdoches, where he became a surveyor and later, as tensions with Mexico rose, he resumed his practice of medicine.

== During the Texas Republic ==
On September 14, 1835, Irion was elected to the Committee of Safety and Vigilance for Nacogdoches and on April 14, 1836, was a commandant of Nacogdoches Municipality. Irion served as a senator from Nacogdoches in the 1st Congress of the Republic of Texas, from October 4, 1836, to June 13, 1837. Texas President Sam Houston appointed him secretary of state of the Republic of Texas in 1837, and Irion traveled to the United States, Canada, England, and Europe representing Texas until President Mirabeau B. Lamar appointed Barnard E. Bee, Sr. to succeed him on December 13, 1838.

== Personal life ==
In March 1840, Irion married Anna W. Raguet (born 1819). She had been courted by Sam Houston who obtained a divorce from his first wife April 8, 1837. In wooing her, Houston had used Irion, his Secretary of State in the Republic of Texas, to carry messages between her and himself. When Irion understood that she was definitely not interested in marrying Houston, he persuaded her to accept his proposal of marriage. They had five children together. One of his daughters married Lawrence Taylor, son of Charles Stanfield Taylor.

== Memorials ==
Irion County, Texas is named after Robert Irion.

Political offices
Preceded by unknown	Senator, Republic of Texas; 1836–1837	Succeeded by unknown
Preceded by J. Pinckney Henderson	Secretary of State of Texas; 1837–1838	Succeeded by T. H. Bowman
