= Cary M. Maguire =

American businessman (1928–2021)

Cary McIlwaine Maguire (May 30, 1928 – August 10, 2021) was an American businessman and philanthropist. He was noted for his involvement with Southern Methodist University, whose ethics center bears his name.

== Early life ==
Maguire was born in Ardmore, Pennsylvania, on May 30, 1928. His father, J. Russell Maguire, worked in the oil business; his mother was Luna Ambler Maguire. He attended the Landon School in Bethesda, Maryland. He then studied economics at the Wharton School of the University of Pennsylvania, graduating with a Bachelor of Science in 1950.

== Career ==
Maguire relocated to Wichita Falls, Texas, a year after graduating to work in the oil industry. He later served as chair and president of the Maguire Oil Company – which he established in 1969 – as well as of the Maguire Energy Company. He was also chair of the Components Corporation of America and Staco. He has served on the National Petroleum Council and the executive committee of Mid-Continental Oil and Gas Association.

=== Philanthropy ===
Maguire sat on the board of trustees of Southern Methodist University from 1976 to 2000. He also sat on the board of directors of the John Goodwin Tower Center for Political Studies at SMU. The Maguire Center for Ethics and the Maguire Energy Institute are named in his honor. He founded the latter in 1974, and served on both Advisory Boards. The Cary M. Maguire Chair at SMU is the result of one of his donations to the university. In 1995, he and his wife received the Mustang Award for Philanthropy from SMU. He ultimately donated almost $9 million to SMU during his lifetime.

Maguire was also a member of the James Madison Council of the Library of Congress, where he funded the Maguire Chair in Ethics and American History.

== Personal life ==
Maguire married Ann Thompson in 1956. They met during a blind date in Dallas four years earlier. Together, they had three children: Cary Jr., Melinda, and Blainey. He and his wife resided in Dallas, Texas. He enjoyed painting and sculpting as hobbies, as well as amassing presidential memorabilia.

Maguire died on August 10, 2021, at his home in Dallas. He was 93 years old.
