= 1956 United States presidential election in Texas =

- November 6, 1956

Nominee	Dwight D. Eisenhower	Adlai Stevenson
Party	Republican	Democratic
Home state	Pennsylvania (Note: Although he was born in Texas and grew up in Kansas before his military career, at the time of the 1952 election Eisenhower was president of Columbia University and was, officially, a resident of New York. During his first term as president, he moved his private residence to Gettysburg, Pennsylvania, and officially changed his residency to Pennsylvania.)	Illinois
Running mate	Richard Nixon	Estes Kefauver
Electoral vote	24	0
Popular vote	1,080,619	859,958
Percentage	55.26%	43.98%

Eisenhower
40–50%
50–60%
60–70%
70–80%
80–90%
90–100%
Stevenson
40–50%
50–60%
60–70%
70–80%
80–90%
President before election
Dwight D. Eisenhower
Republican
Elected President
Dwight D. Eisenhower
Republican

The 1956 United States presidential election in Texas took place on November 6, 1956, as part of the 1956 United States presidential election. Incumbent President Eisenhower won his birth state of Texas with 55% of the vote, giving him 24 electoral votes. Despite Eisenhower becoming the first Republican to win Texas by double digits, this result nonetheless made Texas 4.12% more Democratic than the nation-at-large. Eisenhower became the first Republican to carry Texas twice, having won the state in 1952 as well.

This was the last time Texas voted for a Republican presidential candidate until Eisenhower's vice president, Richard Nixon, won the state in his re-election bid in 1972.

== Polls ==
Source	Rating	As of
Fort Worth Star-Telegram	Likely D (flip)	November 2, 1956
Corpus Christi Times	Tossup	November 3, 1956
The Philadelphia Inquirer	Tilt D (flip)	November 4, 1956
The Salt Lake Tribune	Tilt D (flip)	November 4, 1956

== Results ==
Electoral results
Presidential candidate	Party	Home state	Popular vote		Electoral vote	Running mate		
Presidential candidate	Party	Home state	Count	Percentage	Electoral vote	Vice-presidential candidate	Home state	Electoral vote
Dwight D. Eisenhower (incumbent)	Republican	Pennsylvania	1,080,619	55.26%	24	Richard Nixon (incumbent)	California	24
Adlai Stevenson II	Democratic	Illinois	859,958	43.98%	0	Estes Kefauver	Tennessee	0
T. Coleman Andrews	Constitution	Virginia	14,589	0.75%	0	Thomas H. Werdel	California	0
Write-in candidates	—	—	377 (Note: These write-in votes were not listed by county but only as a statewide total.)	0.02%	0	—	—	0
Total			1,955,943	100%	24			24
Needed to win					266			266

=== Results by county ===
County	Dwight D. Eisenhower Republican		Adlai Stevenson Democratic		T. Coleman Andrews Constitution/States’ Rights		Margin		Total votes cast
County	#	%	#	%	#	%	#	%	Total votes cast
Anderson	4,181	60.47%	2,710	39.20%	23	0.33%	1,471	21.27%	6,914
Andrews	1,131	53.53%	968	45.81%	14	0.66%	163	7.72%	2,113
Angelina	5,274	52.24%	4,781	47.36%	41	0.41%	493	4.88%	10,096
Aransas	757	63.67%	425	35.74%	7	0.59%	332	27.93%	1,189
Archer	825	43.44%	1,067	56.19%	7	0.37%	-242	-12.75%	1,899
Armstrong	372	46.62%	422	52.88%	4	0.50%	-50	-6.26%	798
Atascosa	1,804	54.55%	1,492	45.12%	11	0.33%	312	9.43%	3,307
Austin	2,501	67.12%	1,215	32.61%	10	0.27%	1,286	34.51%	3,726
Bailey	871	40.49%	1,274	59.23%	6	0.28%	-403	-18.74%	2,151
Bandera	1,083	76.05%	336	23.60%	5	0.35%	747	52.45%	1,424
Bastrop	1,531	37.85%	2,504	61.90%	10	0.25%	-973	-24.05%	4,045
Baylor	715	40.49%	1,047	59.29%	4	0.23%	-332	-18.80%	1,766
Bee	2,401	55.26%	1,929	44.40%	15	0.35%	472	10.86%	4,345
Bell	4,285	30.76%	9,603	68.93%	44	0.32%	-5,318	-38.17%	13,932
Bexar	65,901	58.15%	46,790	41.29%	640	0.56%	19,111	16.86%	113,331
Blanco	796	56.14%	615	43.37%	7	0.49%	181	12.77%	1,418
Borden	127	34.51%	240	65.22%	1	0.27%	-113	-30.71%	368
Bosque	1,654	49.65%	1,670	50.14%	7	0.21%	-16	-0.49%	3,331
Bowie	6,823	46.73%	7,675	52.56%	104	0.71%	-852	-5.83%	14,602
Brazoria	9,536	56.49%	7,137	42.28%	208	1.23%	2,399	14.21%	16,881
Brazos	4,942	58.58%	3,463	41.05%	31	0.37%	1,479	17.53%	8,436
Brewster	837	63.22%	479	36.18%	8	0.60%	358	27.04%	1,324
Briscoe	357	35.42%	648	64.29%	3	0.30%	-291	-28.87%	1,008
Brooks	802	41.77%	1,108	57.71%	10	0.52%	-306	-15.94%	1,920
Brown	3,664	53.26%	3,195	46.44%	21	0.31%	469	6.82%	6,880
Burleson	1,173	40.24%	1,726	59.21%	16	0.55%	-553	-18.97%	2,915
Burnet	1,163	44.90%	1,422	54.90%	5	0.19%	-259	-10.00%	2,590
Caldwell	1,747	40.96%	2,513	58.92%	5	0.12%	-766	-17.96%	4,265
Calhoun	1,912	63.90%	1,067	35.66%	13	0.43%	845	28.24%	2,992
Callahan	1,140	48.45%	1,199	50.96%	14	0.59%	-59	-2.51%	2,353
Cameron	11,952	56.85%	8,829	42.00%	241	1.15%	3,123	14.85%	21,022
Camp	958	47.22%	1,053	51.90%	18	0.89%	-95	-4.68%	2,029
Carson	1,061	51.91%	976	47.75%	7	0.34%	85	4.16%	2,044
Cass	2,970	54.91%	2,395	44.28%	44	0.81%	575	10.63%	5,409
Castro	697	34.75%	1,305	65.05%	4	0.20%	-608	-30.30%	2,006
Chambers	1,520	63.52%	860	35.94%	13	0.54%	660	27.58%	2,393
Cherokee	4,022	57.78%	2,912	41.83%	27	0.39%	1,110	15.95%	6,961
Childress	1,268	45.61%	1,503	54.06%	9	0.32%	-235	-8.45%	2,780
Clay	990	35.26%	1,813	64.57%	5	0.18%	-823	-29.31%	2,808
Cochran	599	39.33%	923	60.60%	1	0.07%	-324	-21.27%	1,523
Coke	549	44.10%	690	55.42%	6	0.48%	-141	-11.32%	1,245
Coleman	2,247	58.50%	1,577	41.06%	17	0.44%	670	17.44%	3,841
Collin	3,823	41.84%	5,280	57.79%	34	0.37%	-1,457	-15.95%	9,137
Collingsworth	815	39.66%	1,229	59.81%	11	0.54%	-414	-20.15%	2,055
Colorado	2,691	61.62%	1,648	37.74%	28	0.64%	1,043	23.88%	4,367
Comal	3,397	74.54%	1,140	25.02%	20	0.44%	2,257	49.52%	4,557
Comanche	1,900	48.99%	1,962	50.59%	16	0.41%	-62	-1.60%	3,878
Concho	574	50.26%	567	49.65%	1	0.09%	7	0.61%	1,142
Cooke	4,164	64.33%	2,272	35.10%	37	0.57%	1,892	29.23%	6,473
Coryell	1,509	38.86%	2,372	61.09%	2	0.05%	-863	-22.23%	3,883
Cottle	329	22.40%	1,138	77.47%	2	0.14%	-809	-55.07%	1,469
Crane	626	46.44%	707	52.45%	15	1.11%	-81	-6.01%	1,348
Crockett	702	69.57%	305	30.23%	2	0.20%	397	39.34%	1,009
Crosby	704	28.00%	1,804	71.76%	6	0.24%	-1,100	-43.76%	2,514
Culberson	324	54.36%	269	45.13%	3	0.50%	55	9.23%	596
Dallam	1,018	48.41%	1,074	51.07%	11	0.52%	-56	-2.66%	2,103
Dallas	125,361	65.06%	65,472	33.98%	1,862	0.97%	59,889	31.08%	192,695
Dawson	1,615	44.01%	2,049	55.83%	6	0.16%	-434	-11.82%	3,670
Deaf Smith	1,685	55.16%	1,361	44.55%	9	0.29%	324	10.61%	3,055
Delta	605	32.23%	1,262	67.23%	10	0.53%	-657	-35.00%	1,877
Denton	5,350	51.71%	4,972	48.06%	24	0.23%	378	3.65%	10,346
DeWitt	3,401	70.14%	1,435	29.59%	13	0.27%	1,966	40.55%	4,849
Dickens	565	31.25%	1,243	68.75%	0	0.00%	-678	-37.50%	1,808
Dimmit	705	61.90%	427	37.49%	7	0.61%	278	24.41%	1,139
Donley	826	47.72%	903	52.17%	2	0.12%	-77	-4.45%	1,731
Duval	1,459	31.89%	3,110	67.98%	6	0.13%	-1,651	-36.09%	4,575
Eastland	3,580	58.61%	2,512	41.13%	16	0.26%	1,068	17.48%	6,108
Ector	8,805	62.41%	5,109	36.21%	194	1.38%	3,696	26.20%	14,108
Edwards	533	79.67%	133	19.88%	3	0.45%	400	59.79%	669
Ellis	3,585	40.65%	5,211	59.08%	24	0.27%	-1,626	-18.43%	8,820
El Paso	18,532	54.70%	15,157	44.73%	193	0.57%	3,375	9.97%	33,882
Erath	2,775	53.66%	2,377	45.97%	19	0.37%	398	7.69%	5,171
Falls	1,819	40.36%	2,674	59.33%	14	0.31%	-855	-18.97%	4,507
Fannin	1,910	29.75%	4,504	70.16%	6	0.09%	-2,594	-40.41%	6,420
Fayette	3,574	60.54%	2,282	38.65%	48	0.81%	1,292	21.89%	5,904
Fisher	673	28.72%	1,664	71.02%	6	0.26%	-991	-42.30%	2,343
Floyd	1,445	44.86%	1,767	54.86%	9	0.28%	-322	-10.00%	3,221
Foard	243	26.07%	687	73.71%	2	0.21%	-444	-47.64%	932
Fort Bend	3,779	59.83%	2,464	39.01%	73	1.16%	1,315	20.82%	6,316
Franklin	556	33.88%	1,082	65.94%	3	0.18%	-526	-32.06%	1,641
Freestone	1,627	47.09%	1,813	52.47%	15	0.43%	-186	-5.38%	3,455
Frio	825	47.94%	886	51.48%	10	0.58%	-61	-3.54%	1,721
Gaines	1,244	44.76%	1,527	54.95%	8	0.29%	-283	-10.19%	2,779
Galveston	17,567	52.43%	15,603	46.57%	336	1.00%	1,964	5.86%	33,506
Garza	628	44.38%	786	55.55%	1	0.07%	-158	-11.17%	1,415
Gillespie	3,070	92.61%	240	7.24%	5	0.15%	2,830	85.37%	3,315
Glasscock	224	56.28%	174	43.72%	0	0.00%	50	12.56%	398
Goliad	902	72.33%	338	27.11%	7	0.56%	564	45.22%	1,247
Gonzales	1,767	43.77%	2,260	55.98%	10	0.25%	-493	-12.21%	4,037
Gray	5,047	61.90%	3,034	37.21%	72	0.88%	2,013	24.69%	8,153
Grayson	7,402	45.33%	8,876	54.35%	52	0.32%	-1,474	-9.02%	16,330
Gregg	9,440	65.02%	4,881	33.62%	198	1.36%	4,559	31.40%	14,519
Grimes	1,281	53.96%	1,079	45.45%	14	0.59%	202	8.51%	2,374
Guadalupe	4,296	66.86%	2,099	32.67%	30	0.47%	2,197	34.19%	6,425
Hale	3,804	49.64%	3,848	50.22%	11	0.14%	-44	-0.58%	7,663
Hall	687	31.53%	1,487	68.24%	5	0.23%	-800	-36.71%	2,179
Hamilton	1,709	60.11%	1,124	39.54%	10	0.35%	585	20.57%	2,843
Hansford	919	62.73%	545	37.20%	1	0.07%	374	25.53%	1,465
Hardeman	1,119	46.45%	1,281	53.18%	9	0.37%	-162	-6.73%	2,409
Hardin	2,130	47.12%	2,371	52.46%	19	0.42%	-241	-5.34%	4,520
Harris	155,555	61.11%	93,961	36.91%	5,033	1.98%	61,594	24.20%	254,549
Harrison	5,048	64.76%	2,668	34.23%	79	1.01%	2,380	30.53%	7,795
Hartley	353	43.96%	448	55.79%	2	0.25%	-95	-11.83%	803
Haskell	993	29.72%	2,340	70.04%	8	0.24%	-1,347	-40.32%	3,341
Hays	1,873	47.98%	2,017	51.66%	14	0.36%	-144	-3.68%	3,904
Hemphill	620	60.67%	401	39.24%	1	0.10%	219	21.43%	1,022
Henderson	2,479	44.51%	3,065	55.04%	25	0.45%	-586	-10.53%	5,569
Hidalgo	13,270	56.89%	9,804	42.03%	253	1.08%	3,466	14.86%	23,327
Hill	2,487	37.08%	4,199	62.61%	21	0.31%	-1,712	-25.53%	6,707
Hockley	2,001	38.58%	3,175	61.22%	10	0.19%	-1,174	-22.64%	5,186
Hood	751	40.55%	1,095	59.13%	6	0.32%	-344	-18.58%	1,852
Hopkins	2,206	41.26%	3,118	58.31%	23	0.43%	-912	-17.05%	5,347
Houston	1,941	49.04%	1,998	50.48%	19	0.48%	-57	-1.44%	3,958
Howard	3,051	40.30%	4,506	59.52%	14	0.18%	-1,455	-19.22%	7,571
Hudspeth	316	45.66%	368	53.18%	8	1.16%	-52	-7.52%	692
Hunt	4,508	52.47%	4,051	47.15%	33	0.38%	457	5.32%	8,592
Hutchinson	5,110	54.73%	4,184	44.82%	42	0.45%	926	9.91%	9,336
Irion	252	58.33%	178	41.20%	2	0.46%	74	17.13%	432
Jack	1,327	56.54%	997	42.48%	23	0.98%	330	14.06%	2,347
Jackson	2,259	58.64%	1,571	40.78%	22	0.57%	688	17.86%	3,852
Jasper	2,430	56.41%	1,856	43.08%	22	0.51%	574	13.33%	4,308
Jeff Davis	239	58.72%	165	40.54%	3	0.74%	74	18.18%	407
Jefferson	30,102	54.31%	25,057	45.21%	270	0.49%	5,045	9.10%	55,429
Jim Hogg	282	31.13%	617	68.10%	7	0.77%	-335	-36.97%	906
Jim Wells	3,348	54.69%	2,752	44.95%	22	0.36%	596	9.74%	6,122
Johnson	3,750	51.09%	3,560	48.50%	30	0.41%	190	2.59%	7,340
Jones	2,073	44.32%	2,594	55.46%	10	0.21%	-521	-11.14%	4,677
Karnes	1,764	51.62%	1,636	47.88%	17	0.50%	128	3.74%	3,417
Kaufman	2,816	48.97%	2,902	50.47%	32	0.56%	-86	-1.50%	5,750
Kendall	1,519	81.10%	341	18.21%	13	0.69%	1,178	62.89%	1,873
Kenedy	125	92.59%	10	7.41%	0	0.00%	115	85.18%	135
Kent	234	30.99%	519	68.74%	2	0.26%	-285	-37.75%	755
Kerr	3,555	77.38%	1,025	22.31%	14	0.30%	2,530	55.07%	4,594
Kimble	821	62.82%	484	37.03%	2	0.15%	337	25.79%	1,307
King	46	20.54%	177	79.02%	1	0.45%	-131	-58.48%	224
Kinney	368	55.93%	289	43.92%	1	0.15%	79	12.01%	658
Kleberg	2,121	46.39%	2,436	53.28%	15	0.33%	-315	-6.89%	4,572
Knox	835	39.76%	1,262	60.10%	3	0.14%	-427	-20.34%	2,100
Lamar	4,154	49.56%	4,202	50.14%	25	0.30%	-48	-0.58%	8,381
Lamb	1,840	35.54%	3,325	64.23%	12	0.23%	-1,485	-28.69%	5,177
Lampasas	1,308	53.45%	1,134	46.34%	5	0.20%	174	7.11%	2,447
La Salle	449	43.85%	574	56.05%	1	0.10%	-125	-12.20%	1,024
Lavaca	2,509	50.78%	2,412	48.82%	20	0.40%	97	1.96%	4,941
Lee	1,200	52.77%	1,061	46.66%	13	0.57%	139	6.11%	2,274
Leon	1,079	45.99%	1,260	53.71%	7	0.30%	-181	-7.72%	2,346
Liberty	4,129	63.49%	2,318	35.65%	56	0.86%	1,811	27.84%	6,503
Limestone	2,097	40.55%	3,067	59.31%	7	0.14%	-970	-18.76%	5,171
Lipscomb	806	69.84%	345	29.90%	3	0.26%	461	39.94%	1,154
Live Oak	1,077	65.71%	521	31.79%	41	2.50%	556	33.92%	1,639
Llano	672	39.32%	1,034	60.50%	3	0.18%	-362	-21.18%	1,709
Loving	55	60.44%	36	39.56%	0	0.00%	19	20.88%	91
Lubbock	13,970	52.57%	12,540	47.19%	66	0.25%	1,430	5.38%	26,576
Lynn	861	32.28%	1,800	67.49%	6	0.22%	-939	-35.21%	2,667
McCulloch	1,292	52.63%	1,158	47.17%	5	0.20%	134	5.46%	2,455
McLennan	15,561	48.85%	16,181	50.80%	111	0.35%	-620	-1.95%	31,853
McMullen	226	54.72%	185	44.79%	2	0.48%	41	9.93%	413
Madison	733	50.27%	713	48.90%	12	0.82%	20	1.37%	1,458
Marion	1,126	60.93%	709	38.37%	13	0.70%	417	22.56%	1,848
Martin	318	25.92%	903	73.59%	6	0.49%	-585	-47.67%	1,227
Mason	885	63.67%	504	36.26%	1	0.07%	381	27.41%	1,390
Matagorda	3,927	66.46%	1,904	32.22%	78	1.32%	2,023	34.24%	5,909
Maverick	721	46.22%	820	52.56%	19	1.22%	-99	-6.34%	1,560
Medina	2,668	63.51%	1,516	36.09%	17	0.40%	1,152	27.42%	4,201
Menard	614	65.88%	318	34.12%	0	0.00%	296	31.76%	932
Midland	8,287	69.99%	3,468	29.29%	86	0.73%	4,819	40.70%	11,841
Milam	2,486	45.48%	2,969	54.32%	11	0.20%	-483	-8.84%	5,466
Mills	912	55.34%	735	44.60%	1	0.06%	177	10.74%	1,648
Mitchell	1,091	36.59%	1,891	63.41%	0	0.00%	-800	-26.82%	2,982
Montague	2,003	45.81%	2,358	53.93%	11	0.25%	-355	-8.12%	4,372
Montgomery	3,360	56.24%	2,572	43.05%	42	0.70%	788	13.19%	5,974
Moore	1,820	44.95%	2,219	54.80%	10	0.25%	-399	-9.85%	4,049
Morris	1,463	47.58%	1,592	51.77%	20	0.65%	-129	-4.19%	3,075
Motley	411	44.38%	511	55.18%	4	0.43%	-100	-10.80%	926
Nacogdoches	3,285	53.28%	2,855	46.31%	25	0.41%	430	6.97%	6,165
Navarro	3,193	40.26%	4,723	59.55%	15	0.19%	-1,530	-19.29%	7,931
Newton	1,030	49.61%	1,037	49.95%	9	0.43%	-7	-0.34%	2,076
Nolan	2,232	46.69%	2,535	53.03%	13	0.27%	-303	-6.34%	4,780
Nueces	19,985	49.89%	19,912	49.71%	162	0.40%	73	0.18%	40,059
Ochiltree	1,209	69.48%	512	29.43%	19	1.09%	697	40.05%	1,740
Oldham	284	49.13%	294	50.87%	0	0.00%	-10	-1.74%	578
Orange	5,501	47.99%	5,910	51.56%	51	0.44%	-409	-3.57%	11,462
Palo Pinto	2,818	54.20%	2,369	45.57%	12	0.23%	449	8.63%	5,199
Panola	2,538	52.48%	2,225	46.01%	73	1.51%	313	6.47%	4,836
Parker	3,390	51.46%	3,165	48.04%	33	0.50%	225	3.42%	6,588
Parmer	1,028	42.76%	1,362	56.66%	14	0.58%	-334	-13.90%	2,404
Pecos	1,425	60.20%	931	39.33%	11	0.46%	494	20.87%	2,367
Polk	1,663	52.89%	1,465	46.60%	16	0.51%	198	6.29%	3,144
Potter	11,943	57.66%	8,720	42.10%	49	0.24%	3,223	15.56%	20,712
Presidio	494	48.48%	517	50.74%	8	0.79%	-23	-2.26%	1,019
Rains	427	44.85%	524	55.04%	1	0.11%	-97	-10.19%	952
Randall	4,609	62.28%	2,774	37.49%	17	0.23%	1,835	24.79%	7,400
Reagan	669	63.47%	384	36.43%	1	0.09%	285	27.04%	1,054
Real	350	64.70%	191	35.30%	0	0.00%	159	29.40%	541
Red River	1,956	43.14%	2,567	56.62%	11	0.24%	-611	-13.48%	4,534
Reeves	1,492	52.24%	1,356	47.48%	8	0.28%	136	4.76%	2,856
Refugio	1,355	53.10%	1,188	46.55%	9	0.35%	167	6.55%	2,552
Roberts	279	69.92%	118	29.57%	2	0.50%	161	40.35%	399
Robertson	1,285	36.63%	2,212	63.06%	11	0.31%	-927	-26.43%	3,508
Rockwall	657	41.50%	920	58.12%	6	0.38%	-263	-16.62%	1,583
Runnels	2,416	62.54%	1,442	37.33%	5	0.13%	974	25.21%	3,863
Rusk	5,140	59.96%	3,381	39.44%	52	0.61%	1,759	20.52%	8,573
Sabine	801	46.71%	913	53.24%	1	0.06%	-112	-6.53%	1,715
San Augustine	900	45.07%	1,086	54.38%	11	0.55%	-186	-9.31%	1,997
San Jacinto	565	42.51%	755	56.81%	9	0.68%	-190	-14.30%	1,329
San Patricio	3,302	46.82%	3,728	52.86%	22	0.31%	-426	-6.04%	7,052
San Saba	797	35.87%	1,419	63.86%	6	0.27%	-622	-27.99%	2,222
Schleicher	471	58.08%	336	41.43%	4	0.49%	135	16.65%	811
Scurry	2,250	45.46%	2,691	54.37%	8	0.16%	-441	-8.91%	4,949
Shackelford	849	60.26%	555	39.39%	5	0.35%	294	20.87%	1,409
Shelby	1,988	36.54%	3,403	62.56%	49	0.90%	-1,415	-26.02%	5,440
Sherman	481	55.35%	383	44.07%	5	0.58%	98	11.28%	869
Smith	12,255	65.21%	6,468	34.42%	69	0.37%	5,787	30.79%	18,792
Somervell	467	59.80%	309	39.56%	5	0.64%	158	20.24%	781
Starr	547	16.71%	2,727	83.29%	0	0.00%	-2,180	-66.58%	3,274
Stephens	1,832	61.66%	1,126	37.90%	13	0.44%	706	23.76%	2,971
Sterling	223	59.79%	150	40.21%	0	0.00%	73	19.58%	373
Stonewall	306	26.89%	829	72.85%	3	0.26%	-523	-45.96%	1,138
Sutton	546	65.16%	290	34.61%	2	0.24%	256	30.55%	838
Swisher	876	32.64%	1,802	67.14%	6	0.22%	-926	-34.50%	2,684
Tarrant	66,329	59.65%	43,922	39.50%	946	0.85%	22,407	20.15%	111,197
Taylor	9,488	56.82%	7,177	42.98%	34	0.20%	2,311	13.84%	16,699
Terrell	350	61.51%	217	38.14%	2	0.35%	133	23.37%	569
Terry	1,473	41.78%	2,050	58.14%	3	0.09%	-577	-16.36%	3,526
Throckmorton	466	41.35%	656	58.21%	5	0.44%	-190	-16.86%	1,127
Titus	1,971	45.78%	2,301	53.45%	33	0.77%	-330	-7.67%	4,305
Tom Green	9,070	64.63%	4,923	35.08%	40	0.29%	4,147	29.55%	14,033
Travis	23,551	53.98%	19,982	45.80%	98	0.22%	3,569	8.18%	43,631
Trinity	865	43.98%	1,091	55.47%	11	0.56%	-226	-11.49%	1,967
Tyler	1,734	68.24%	797	31.37%	10	0.39%	937	36.87%	2,541
Upshur	2,737	57.45%	1,995	41.88%	32	0.67%	742	15.57%	4,764
Upton	999	54.29%	834	45.33%	7	0.38%	165	8.96%	1,840
Uvalde	2,449	70.72%	994	28.70%	20	0.58%	1,455	42.02%	3,463
Val Verde	1,660	50.81%	1,598	48.91%	9	0.28%	62	1.90%	3,267
Van Zandt	2,142	42.25%	2,919	57.57%	9	0.18%	-777	-15.32%	5,070
Victoria	5,596	62.85%	3,280	36.84%	28	0.31%	2,316	26.01%	8,904
Walker	1,991	59.86%	1,287	38.70%	48	1.44%	704	21.16%	3,326
Waller	1,426	59.49%	929	38.76%	42	1.75%	497	20.73%	2,397
Ward	1,772	51.63%	1,638	47.73%	22	0.64%	134	3.90%	3,432
Washington	2,975	75.83%	933	23.78%	15	0.38%	2,042	52.05%	3,923
Webb	2,744	31.96%	5,827	67.86%	16	0.19%	-3,083	-35.90%	8,587
Wharton	4,714	57.47%	3,439	41.92%	50	0.61%	1,275	15.55%	8,203
Wheeler	1,178	48.22%	1,252	51.25%	13	0.53%	-74	-3.03%	2,443
Wichita	12,181	48.83%	12,726	51.01%	41	0.16%	-545	-2.18%	24,948
Wilbarger	2,230	48.62%	2,347	51.17%	10	0.22%	-117	-2.55%	4,587
Willacy	1,656	56.17%	1,261	42.77%	31	1.05%	395	13.40%	2,948
Williamson	2,947	40.00%	4,402	59.75%	18	0.24%	-1,455	-19.75%	7,367
Wilson	1,519	41.30%	2,149	58.43%	10	0.27%	-630	-17.13%	3,678
Winkler	1,471	52.97%	1,287	46.34%	19	0.68%	184	6.63%	2,777
Wise	2,058	45.49%	2,443	54.00%	23	0.51%	-385	-8.51%	4,524
Wood	2,508	53.11%	2,199	46.57%	15	0.32%	309	6.54%	4,722
Yoakum	923	48.20%	989	51.64%	3	0.16%	-66	-3.44%	1,915
Young	2,083	50.44%	2,028	49.10%	19	0.46%	55	1.34%	4,130
Zapata	637	41.80%	886	58.14%	1	0.07%	-249	-16.34%	1,524
Zavala	896	62.79%	528	37.00%	3	0.21%	368	25.79%	1,427
Totals	1,080,619	55.26%	859,958	43.98%	14,591	0.75%	220,661	11.28%	1,955,545

==== Counties that flipped from Democratic to Republican ====
- Andrews
- Angelina
- Brazoria
- Cass
- Cherokee
- Galveston
- Irion
- Jasper
- Jefferson
- Johnson
- Jim Wells
- Lee
- Moadison
- Marion
- Montgomery
- Nacogdoches
- Nueces
- Panola
- Polk
- Rusk
- Upshur
- Walker
- Wood

==== Counties that flipped from Republican to Democratic ====
- Armstrong
- Bailey
- Bosque
- Briscoe
- Castro
- Childress
- Collingsworth
- Comanche
- Dallam
- Dawson
- Donley
- Floyd
- Frio
- Hale
- Hardeman
- Hartley
- Hays
- Hudspeth
- Jones
- Lamb
- Motley
- Madison
- Parmer
- Presidio
- Scurry
- Swisher
- Wheeler
- Wilbarger

== See also ==
- United States presidential elections in Texas
