= Maguire Center for Ethics =

University center in Dallas, Texas, U.S.

Cary M. Maguire Center for Ethics and Public Responsibility
- Location: Southern Methodist University, Dallas, Texas
- Website: www.smu.edu/Provost/Ethics

The Cary M. Maguire Center for Ethics and Public Responsibility serves the campus of Southern Methodist University and the greater Dallas area. The university-wide center supports student and faculty ethics-related education and activities, as well as outreach to community, in both private and public institutions.

== History ==
The Cary M. Maguire Center for Ethics & Public Responsibility was funded by an endowment of $2.5 million from Cary M. Maguire in 1995. The center is the culmination of years of planning by visionary members of the SMU faculty, then-Provost Ruth Morgan, President ad interim James Kirby, and President Gerald Turner, all of whom believe that in today's hurried world it takes intentional reflection to devise ethical responses to society's problems.

The first director (1995–1998) was Professor William F. May, who was also the first member of the faculty to occupy the Maguire Chair in Ethics and who more recently held the Cary and Ann Maguire Chair in American History and Ethics in the John W. Kluge Center of the Library of Congress. Many of the center's current activities and programs were established during Bill May's productive tenure as director. The second director (1998–2005), Professor Richard O. Mason, the Carr P. Collins Professor of Management Information Sciences Emeritus at the Cox School of Business, continued the center along the course charted by Bill May and intensified our outreach to other educational and business organizations in the Dallas-Fort Worth community. The third was Professor Thomas Mayo (2005–2010) of the Dedman School of Law. He continued the programs normally sponsored by the Maguire Center and created ongoing relationships with the North Texas Bioethics Network and the Dallas Institute of Humanities and Culture. In addition, he expanded the number of public service interns that the center sponsors and directed the first two-day conference that the center had ever held. Finally, the fourth and current director of the center is Rita G. Kirk, Ph.D., (2011– ), Professor of Communication Studies at the Meadows School of the Arts.

== Public Service Internships ==
The Maguire Center – with financial assistance from the Irby Family Foundation – awards public service summer internships to SMU students who wish to devote time to public service. The center has supported volunteers in over 115 agencies in nineteen Texas cities, fourteen states, and fifteen countries outside the US. Through these, students gain concrete information about others' needs, as well as differing perspectives on how to resolve them. They also gain experience, which illuminates concepts taught in the classroom, and that enables them to engage in public service where financial circumstances might not otherwise allow.

== The Maguire Undergraduate Scholars for Ethics ==
Along with the Public Service Internships, the center also supports MUSE or The Maguire Undergraduate Scholars for Ethics. MUSE is a select group of four to seven undergraduate students whose purpose is to design programs addressing ethical and moral issues pertinent to the SMU community. In the past, students have addressed issues such as cocaine use on campus, the use of Adderall, Ritalin, and other drugs as study aids for students, the changing cultural perceptions of sex, the civic duty of voting, and food deserts. The Design Team has focused on these issues through such initiatives as designing programs for wellness classes, making campus presentations, holding a university-wide mock presidential election and planning and leading conferences for the university community. MUSE strives to present all sides of moral and ethical dilemmas. Rather than promoting a particular perspective, the group seeks to educate members of the SMU community in a clear and unbiased way so that others can make their own informed decisions.

== Community Programs ==
The Maguire Ethics Center is committed to both the development of a total "ethics culture" at SMU and to working with partners throughout the Metroplex, bringing the excitement and expertise from the hilltop to the community and vice versa. To that end, they have established ongoing relationships with many local organizations including UT Southwestern Medical Center, The North Texas Bioethics Center, and The Dallas Institute of Humanities and Culture and support multiple community programs in the area.
