= Old Irion County Courthouse =

- Irion County Courthouse
- U.S. National Register of Historic Places
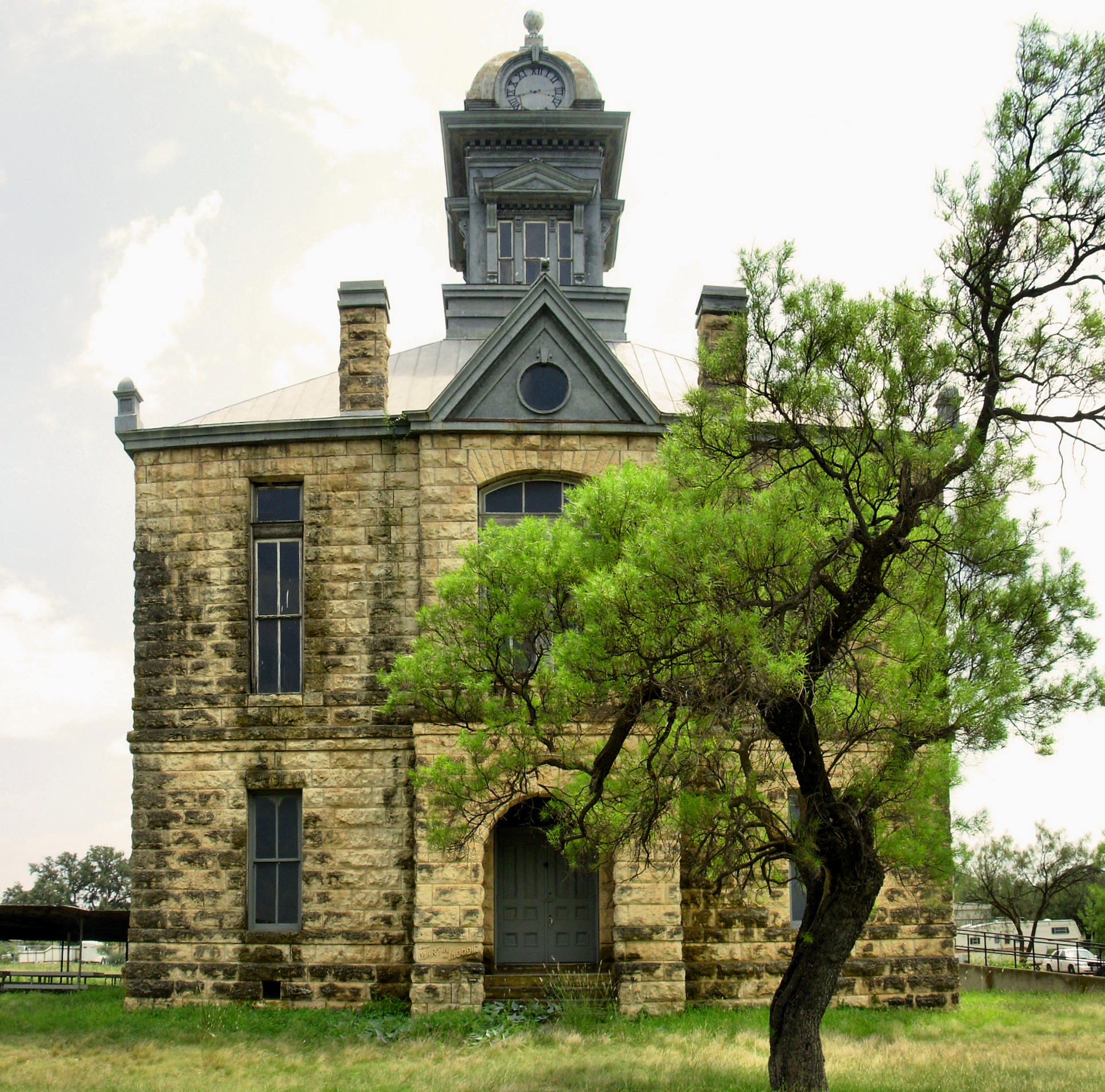
- Former courthouse in 2009

- Location within Texas Location within the United States
- Interactive map showing the location of Irion County Courthouse
- Location: Public Sq., Sherwood, Texas
- Coordinates: 31°16′47″N 100°47′41″W
- Area: 2 acres (0.81 ha)
- Built: 1901
- Architect and builder: Martin & Moodie
- NRHP reference No.: 77001455
- Added to NRHP: August 29, 1977

The Old Irion County Courthouse, on Public Square in Sherwood, Texas, was built in 1901. It was listed on the National Register of Historic Places in 1977 as Irion County Courthouse.

It is a two-story, square-plan stone building.

The courthouse was a work of master builders Martin & Moodie.

It served as a courthouse until 1936.

== See also ==
- National Register of Historic Places listings in Irion County, Texas
- List of county courthouses in Texas
