= James Hollifield =

American political scientist

James F. Hollifield
- Born: 1954 (age 71–72)
- Citizenship: United States
- Occupation: Professor of Political Science

Academic background
- Education: Duke University (PhD) Wake Forest College (BA)

Academic work
- Discipline: International Political Economy; Migration studies International Studies; Western European Politics
- Institutions: Ora Nixon Arnold Professor in International Political Economy in the Department of Political Science, and Director of the Tower Center at SMU in Dallas, Texas
- Website: James Hollifield - SMU

James Frank Hollifield (Jim Hollifield) is an American political scientist and Professor of Political Science at Southern Methodist University (SMU) in Dallas, Texas, where he holds the Ora Nixon Arnold Chair in International Political Economy and serves as Director of the Tower Center for Public Policy and International Affairs.

== Early life and education ==
Hollifield was educated at Wake Forest College, graduating BA with honors. He also studied at Sciences Po Grenoble and Sciences Po Paris, before completing a PhD in Political Science at Duke University in 1985.

== Academic career ==
In 1992-93 Hollifield was Director of Research at the CNRS and Sciences Po in Paris.

Since 2001, he has held the position of Director of the Tower Center for Public Policy and International Affairs at SMU.

Having taught at Duke, Brandeis, and Auburn universities, Hollifield has held fellowships at the Center for International Studies at MIT, the Wilson Center in Washington, DC; the Center for US-Mexican Studies at the University of California, San Diego; the Institut zur Zukunft der Arbeit (IZA) at the University of Bonn; the Global Migration Centre at the Graduate Institute of International Development Studies in Geneva; the Paris Institute for Advanced Study. He is also a member of the New York Council on Foreign Relations; and an expert on the study of migration.

Hollifield has served as a consultant to international organizations, including the United Nations, the World Bank, the Inter-American Development Bank, the European Union, the OECD, and the Organization of American States.

Hollifield has written widely on issues of political and economic development with a focus on migration, and has served as advisor to governments in North and South America, Europe, the Middle East, and Africa.

=== Key Theories ===
Hollifield coined the concept of the "Liberal Paradox", explaining how liberal democracies with their values of open markets and individual rights, naturally attract migrants, but those values also make it harder to tightly control who is allowed to stay. He also writes extensively on the concept of the "Migration State".

== Honours ==
In 2016, Hollifield received the Distinguished Scholar Award from the International Studies Association.

Pi Sigma Alpha professor of the year.

== Selected Publications ==
=== Books ===
- Hollifield, J.F. (1997) L’Immigration et l’État-Nation: à la recherche d’un modèle national. Paris: L’Harmattan.
- Hollifield, J.F. (1992) Immigrants, Markets, and States: The Political Economy of Postwar Europe. Cambridge, MA: Harvard University Press.

=== Co-edited ===
- Brettell, C.B. and Hollifield, J.F. (eds.) (2023) Migration Theory: Talking across Disciplines. 4th edn. New York: Routledge.
- Hollifield, J.F., Martin, P.L., Orrenius, P.M. and Héran, F. (eds.) (2022) Controlling Immigration: A Comparative Perspective. 4th edn. Stanford, CA: Stanford University Press.
- Hollifield, J.F. and Foley, N. (eds.) (2022) Understanding Global Migration. Stanford, CA: Stanford University Press.
- Hollifield, J.F., Orrenius, P.M. and Osang, T. (eds.) (2007) Migration, Trade and Development. Dallas, TX: Federal Reserve Bank of Dallas.
- Baringhorst, S., Hollifield, J.F. and Hunger, U. (eds.) (2006) Herausforderung Migration: Perspektiven der vergleichenden Politikwissenschaft. Berlin: LIT Verlag.
- Brettell, C.B. and Hollifield, J.F. (eds.) (2000) Migration Theory: Talking Across Disciplines. New York: Routledge.
- Jillson, C. and Hollifield, J.F. (eds.) (2000) Pathways to Democracy: The Political Economy of Democratic Transitions. New York: Routledge.
- Hollifield, J.F. and Jillson, C.C. (eds.) (1999) Pathways to Democracy: The Political Economy of Democratic Transitions. New York: Routledge.
- Cornelius, W.A., Martin, P.L. and Hollifield, J.F. (eds.) (1994) Controlling Immigration: A Global Perspective. Stanford, CA: Stanford University Press.
- Hollifield, J.F. and Ross, G. (eds.) (1991) Searching for the New France. New York: Routledge.

=== Journals ===
- Hollifield, J.F. (2004) ‘The emerging migration state’, International Migration Review, 38(3), pp. 885–912.
