= Barnhart, Texas =

Unincorporated Community in Texas, United States

- Unincorporated Community
- Location of Barnhart in Texas and the US Barnhart (the United States)
- Coordinates: 31°13′30″N 101°17′07″W
- Country: United States
- State: Texas
- County: Irion
- Elevation: 1,952 ft (595 m)

Population (2017)
  - Total: 105
- Time zone: UTC-6 (Central (CST))
  - Summer (DST): UTC-5 (CDT)
- ZIP code: 76930
- Area code: 325

Barnhart is an unincorporated community in Irion County, Texas, United States. As of 2017, the population was estimated to be 105.

== History ==
Barnhart was founded by Willam E. Barnhart in 1910, when the Kansas City, Mexico and Orient Railway was constructed through West Texas, passing through the area. A post office opened in Barnhart in 1912, and a school operated in the community from 1912 to 1969. The population was estimated to be approximately 50 in 1915. By 1920, the town had the Barnhart State Bank (which was moved to an adjacent town in 1927) and a newspaper - the Barnhart Range, published by Ed Downing. In the 1920s and 1930s, Barnhart became a large-volume shipping point, due to its location between major railroad lines. Barnhart was described as "dusty, bawling cattle, hell-raising cowboys and trains a half-mile long", in the 1920s and 30s. Barnhart had everything the cowboys and railroaders needed: A hotel, cafe, a bank and a theater. Because of the remoteness of West Texas, traditional cattle drives continued to Barnhart, long after the practice was popular. The amount of cattle coming through began to cause problems for the local ranchers. To protect the pastures from over-grazing, ranchers began to put up more fencing. This ended what may have been the beginning of the end to cattle drives in Texas. To circumvent the issue, the Ozona-Barnhart Trap Company was formed in 1924. A long, narrow path of leased/purchased land stretching 34 miles, from south of Ozona to Barnhart, became Texas’ last major cattle trail. In April 1934, Barnhart's former postmaster pled guilty in federal court to “conversion of funds.” Barnhart, which is out in the middle of the Texas plains, naturally lacked law enforcement at that time. During the Great Depression, the federal government began buying up the cattle, and then having them slaughtered to reduce supply, in hopes of reviving a market that had practically died. By the year 2000, the population was estimated to be 160.

== Education ==
All of the county is in the Irion County Independent School District.

All of Irion County is in the service area of Howard County Junior College District.

== Highways ==
- US 67
- SH 163

== Climate ==
According to the Köppen Climate Classification system, Barnhart has a semi-arid climate, abbreviated "BSk" on climate maps.

Climate data for Barnhart, Texas
Month	Jan	Feb	Mar	Apr	May	Jun	Jul	Aug	Sep	Oct	Nov	Dec	Year
Record high °F (°C)	84 (29)	93 (34)	96 (36)	100 (38)	111 (44)	115 (46)	110 (43)	109 (43)	105 (41)	102 (39)	89 (32)	84 (29)	115 (46)
Mean daily maximum °F (°C)	57.5 (14.2)	61.6 (16.4)	69.9 (21.1)	79.1 (26.2)	86.8 (30.4)	92.5 (33.6)	94.8 (34.9)	93.8 (34.3)	86.7 (30.4)	77.8 (25.4)	66.8 (19.3)	58.7 (14.8)	77.2 (25.1)
Mean daily minimum °F (°C)	27.8 (−2.3)	31.3 (−0.4)	38.7 (3.7)	47.7 (8.7)	57.5 (14.2)	65.2 (18.4)	67.4 (19.7)	66 (19)	59.4 (15.2)	48.3 (9.1)	37.1 (2.8)	28.9 (−1.7)	47.9 (8.8)
Record low °F (°C)	−9 (−23)	−9 (−23)	2 (−17)	18 (−8)	33 (1)	45 (7)	48 (9)	49 (9)	32 (0)	20 (−7)	10 (−12)	−7 (−22)	−9 (−23)
Average precipitation inches (mm)	.6 (15)	.9 (23)	.9 (23)	1.3 (33)	2.4 (61)	2.2 (56)	1.8 (46)	1.9 (48)	2.6 (66)	1.9 (48)	.9 (23)	.8 (20)	18 (460)
Average precipitation days	3	3	3	3	5	4	4	4	5	4	2	2	42
Source: Weatherbase

In 2013, Barnhart experienced a drought which was exacerbated by the copious consumption of groundwater used in the hydraulic fracking process of petroleum extraction.
