= James C. Oberwetter =

American diplomat

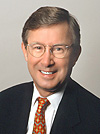
James C. Oberwetter

James C. Oberwetter (born November 3, 1944) is the former U.S. Ambassador to Saudi Arabia.

== Career ==
He previously served as Press Secretary for then-congressman George H. W. Bush (who later became Vice-President and President of the United States). He has also been the special assistant to the Administrator of the Environmental Protection Agency and a member of the American Petroleum Institute’s Communications Committee.

Prior to his diplomatic service, Oberwetter served as Senior Vice President of Hunt Oil Company, of Dallas, Texas, where he directed the company's public affairs and government relations functions. In 2007, he founded Oberwetter & Company, LLC, which focused on international business and corporate strategies in the public arena. In December 2008, he was selected by the board of the Dallas Regional Chamber to become its president effective February 1, 2009.

== Personal life ==
He and his wife Anita reside in Dallas, Texas. Oberwetter has three daughters: Ellen Oberwetter, Rea Oberwetter MacKay, and Brooke Oberwetter.

He graduated from the University of Texas at Austin with a BJ degree from the School of Communications.

Diplomatic posts
Preceded by Robert W. Jordan	United States Ambassador to Saudi Arabia; 2003–2007	Succeeded by Ford M. Fraker
