= Sherwood, Texas =

- Unincorporated community
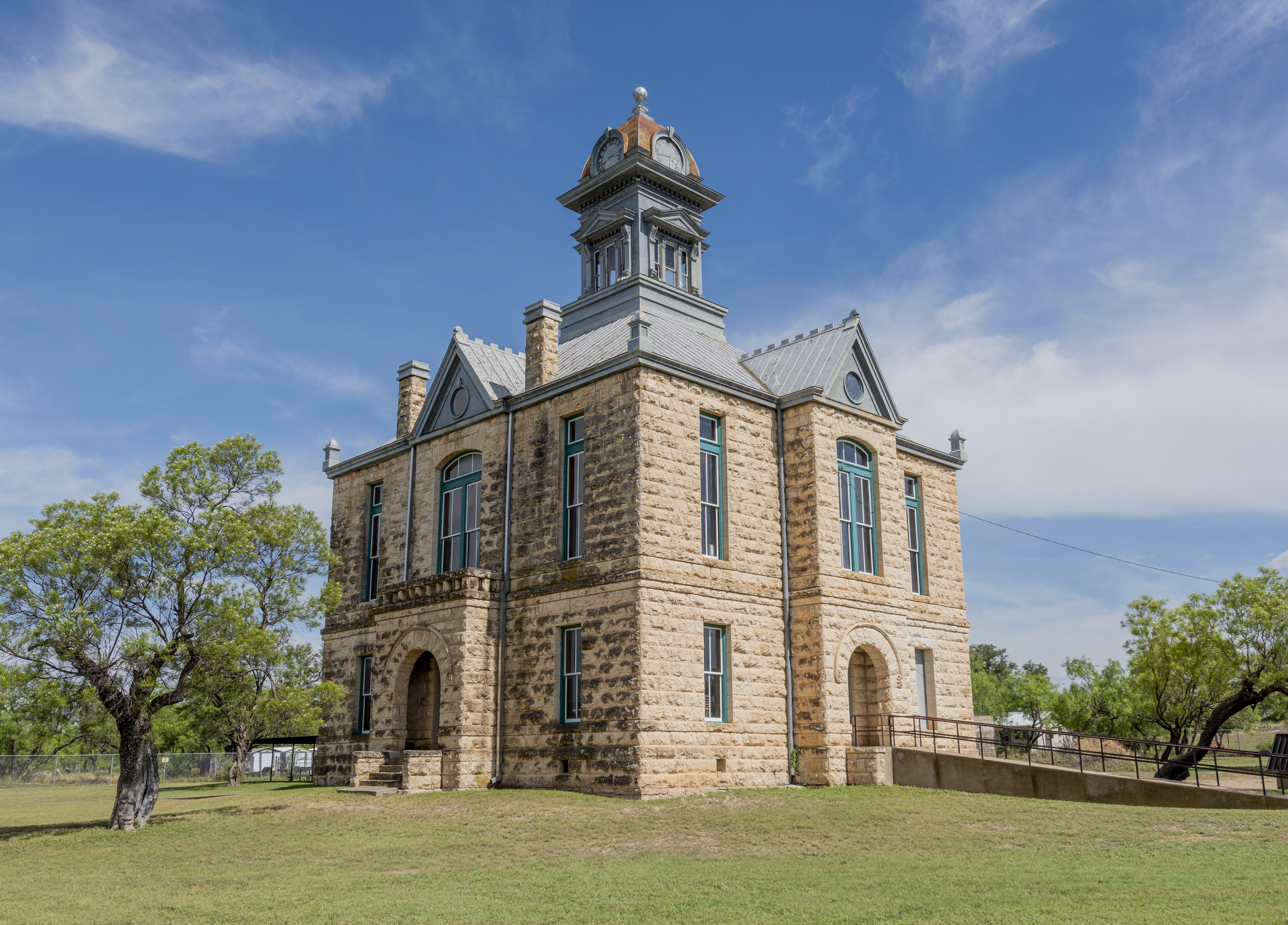
- The 1901 Irion County Courthouse in Sherwood

- Location within Texas Location within the United States
- Coordinates: 31°16′53″N 100°47′43″W
- Country: United States
- State: Texas
- County: Irion

Population (2000 est.)
  - Total: 73
- Time zone: UTC-6 (Central (CST))
  - Summer (DST): UTC-5 (CDT)
- Area code: 325

Sherwood is an unincorporated community in Irion County, Texas, United States. It served as the county seat until 1939, when it was supplanted by neighboring Mertzon.

== History ==
Sherwood was founded in 1886, and when Irion County was organized in 1889, it became the county's seat of government and a courthouse was built. The town received a post office in 1881, with William S. Kelly as first postmaster and by 1900 the population exceeded 300. When the Kansas City, Mexico and Orient Railway built a line across the county in 1910, Sherwood was bypassed and the new railroad town of Mertzon was established. As was the case with many small towns bypassed in the early days of rail transportation, Sherwood was essentially doomed. Commerce soon began to move to Mertzon, and in 1939 the seat of government relocated there as well. Today, Sherwood is home to an estimated 73 residents; the former Irion County Courthouse, built in 1901, still stands at the center of town and functions as a community center. The post office closed in 1974.

== Education ==
All of the county is in the Irion County Independent School District.

All of Irion County is in the service area of Howard County Junior College District.
