= Charles Stanfield Taylor =

English-born politician and soldier (1808–1865)

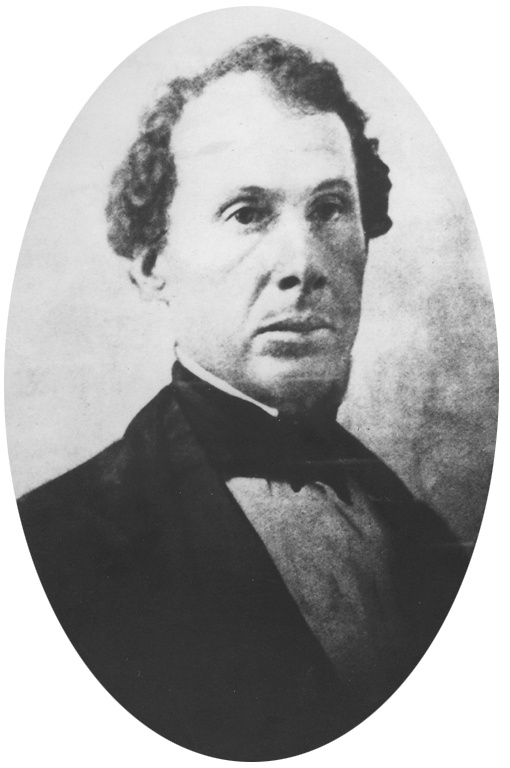
- Born: 1808; London, England
- Died: November 1, 1865 (aged 56–57) Texas, US
- Allegiance: Mexico (1830–1832); Republic of Texas (1833–1836); United States (1837–1861); Confederate States of America (1861–1865)
- Conflicts: Texas Revolution; Battle of Nacogdoches; American Civil War

Charles Stanfield Taylor (1808 – November 1, 1865), sometimes Standfield, was an English-born politician and soldier of Texas.

== Biography ==
Taylor was born in 1808, in London. His parents died when he was a child, and was raised by his uncle. He immigrated to New York City in 1828. He moved to Nacogdoches in 1830, which was part of Mexico at the time.

He gained his Mexican citizenship on April 1, 1830. He fought in the Battle of Nacogdoches in 1832, and represented Nacogdoches in the Convention of 1832. In 1833, he moved to San Augustine, Texas, and was elected mayor on January 1, 1834. He returned to Nacogdoches that summer, and served as the land commissioner of San Augustine from April 25, 1835, to the beginning of the Texas Revolution. He was one of four representatives for Nacogdoches in the Convention of 1836. Taylor was a signer of the Texas Declaration of Independence. He moved to Louisiana for the duration of the revolution. In November 1838, Sam Houston nominated him to survey the Texas border. Mirabeau B. Lamar withdrew his nomination after assuming office.

During the American Civil War, Taylor fought in the 2nd Texas Cavalry Regiment. He died on November 1, 1865. His son Lawrence married the daughter of Robert Anderson Irion. In 1936, a monument was built on his grave.
