= Alan Feld =

Israeli businessman

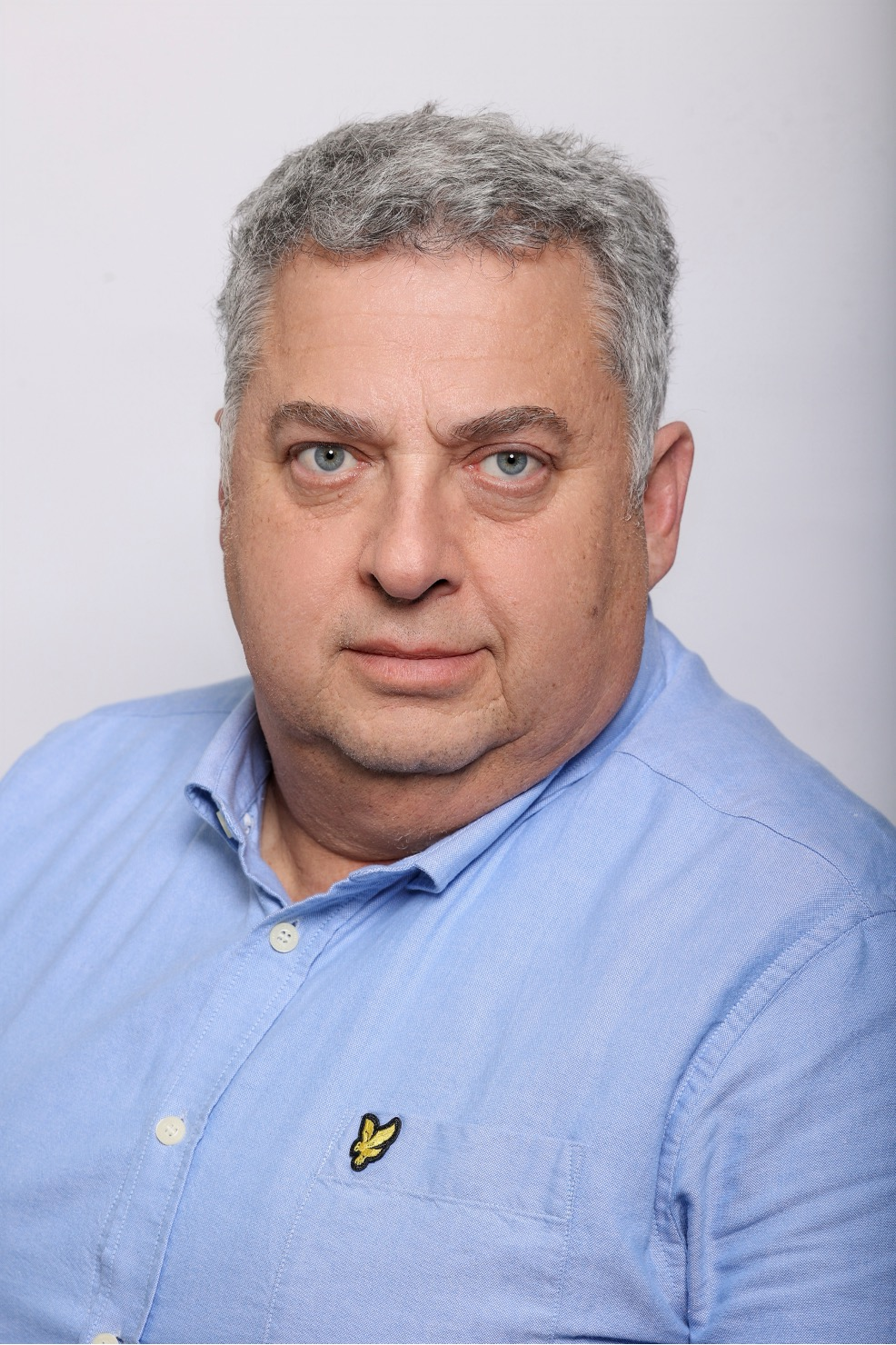
- Alan Feld
- Born: Canada
- Education: Osgoode Hall Law School (LLB); York University (MBA)
- Occupation: Business executive
- Known for: Vintage Investment Partners
- Parents: Ronald Feld Donald Carr (stepfather) (father); Judy Feld Carr (mother)

Alan Feld is an Israeli finance executive. He is the former founder and Managing Partner of Vintage Investment Partners, a large Israeli venture fund.

== Early life and education ==
Feld was born in Canada. His mother is Judy Feld Carr, and his father is Dr. Ronald Feld, who died of a heart attack in 1973. Feld is the stepson of the Donald Carr.

Feld received an MBA from York University in Toronto, an LLB from Osgoode Hall Law School in Toronto, and a bachelor's degree in Commerce and Finance from the University of Toronto.

== Career ==
Feld began his career in 1986 as a young securities lawyer.

Before moving to Israel in 1994, Feld was at Goodman's (Toronto), a Canadian corporate law firm. He was the Managing Director of Evergreen Capital Markets/Robertson Stephens Israel, following when he was a general partner at Israel Seed Partners and at Vertex Ventures.

Feld founded Vintage Investment Partners in 2002 and was the managing partner until he retired in 2025.

Feld is the founder of Kinasnu, a program to train future members of the Israeli Knesset. He also established the Deeptech MBA program at the Coller Institute of Management at Tel Aviv University.

He is the founder and chairman of Judaism by Agreement.

== Boards and other activities ==
Feld was the founder of the Power in Diversity Initiative and also StartUp Jerusalem. He was on the board of the Be’eri project at the Shalom Hartman Institute, Israel Democracy Institute, and Jewish Funders Network.

He is on the board of trustees of the Avi Chai Foundation.

Feld was President of the North American Jewish Students Network and a board member of the Canada-Israel Committee and Kolot (Jerusalem), and also had a leadership role with the Canadian Jewish Congress.

He was on the advisory council of the Kama Tech program and also headed the advisory committee of Tel Aviv University's Deep Tech MBA.
