= Mertzon, Texas =

City in Irion County, Texas, United States

- City
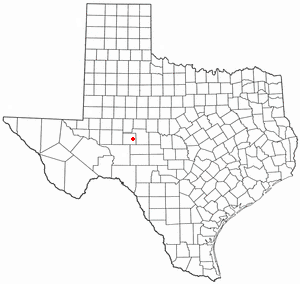
- Location of Mertzon, Texas

- Coordinates: 31°15′36″N 100°49′15″W
- Country: United States
- State: Texas
- County: Irion
- Incorporated: 1933

Area
  - Total: 1.52 sq mi (3.94 km^{2})
  - Land: 1.52 sq mi (3.94 km^{2})
  - Water: 0 sq mi (0.00 km^{2})
- Elevation: 2,201 ft (671 m)

Population (2020)
  - Total: 747
  - Density: 491/sq mi (190/km^{2})
- Time zone: UTC-6 (Central (CST))
  - Summer (DST): UTC-5 (CDT)
- ZIP code: 76941
- Area code: 325
- FIPS code: 48-47832
- GNIS feature ID: 1374888
- Website: www.mertzontexas.com

Mertzon is a city in and the county seat of Irion County, Texas, United States. Its population was 747 according to the 2020 census. It is part of the San Angelo metropolitan area.

== Geography ==
According to the United States Census Bureau, the city has a total area of 1.5 square miles (3.9 km^{2}), all land.

== Demographics ==
=== 2020 census ===
As of the 2020 census, Mertzon had a population of 747; there were 310 households and 264 families residing in the city. The median age was 40.9 years, with 22.1% of residents under the age of 18 and 17.5% of residents 65 years of age or older. For every 100 females there were 99.7 males, and for every 100 females age 18 and over there were 96.6 males age 18 and over.

0.0% of residents lived in urban areas, while 100.0% lived in rural areas.

There were 310 households in Mertzon, of which 36.8% had children under the age of 18 living in them. Of all households, 53.2% were married-couple households, 14.2% were households with a male householder and no spouse or partner present, and 28.4% were households with a female householder and no spouse or partner present. About 22.6% of all households were made up of individuals and 12.5% had someone living alone who was 65 years of age or older.

There were 366 housing units, of which 15.3% were vacant. The homeowner vacancy rate was 2.8% and the rental vacancy rate was 2.4%.

Racial composition as of the 2020 census
Race	Number	Percent
White	535	71.6%
Black or African American	6	0.8%
American Indian and Alaska Native	5	0.7%
Asian	0	0.0%
Native Hawaiian and Other Pacific Islander	1	0.1%
Some other race	102	13.7%
Two or more races	98	13.1%
Hispanic or Latino (of any race)	245	32.8%

=== 2000 census ===
Historical population
Census	Pop.	Note	%±
1930	684		—
1940	869		27.0%
1950	768		−11.6%
1960	584		−24.0%
1970	513		−12.2%
1980	687		33.9%
1990	778		13.2%
2000	839		7.8%
2010	781		−6.9%
2020	747		−4.4%
U.S. Decennial Census

As of the census of 2000, 839 people, 315 households, and 239 families resided in the city. The population density was 551.4 inhabitants per square mile (212.9/km^{2}). There were 364 housing units at an average density of 239.2 per square mile (92.4/km^{2}). The racial makeup of the city was 85.22% White, 0.60% African American, 0.36% Native American, 11.68% from other races, and 2.15% from two or more races. Hispanics or Latinos of any race were 34.21% of the population.

Of the 315 households, 34.0% had children under the age of 18 living with them, 61.9% were married couples living together, 9.2% had a female householder with no husband present, and 24.1% were not families. About 21.3% of all households were made up of individuals, and 12.1% had someone living alone who was 65 years of age or older. The average household size was 2.66 and the average family size was 3.09.

In the city, the population was distributed as 28.8% under the age of 18, 6.2% from 18 to 24, 27.4% from 25 to 44, 22.4% from 45 to 64, and 15.1% who were 65 years of age or older. The median age was 37 years. For every 100 females, there were 95.6 males. For every 100 females age 18 and over, there were 95.7 males.

The median income for a household in the city was $33,333, and for a family was $40,417. Males had a median income of $33,438 versus $17,250 for females. The per capita income for the city was $17,795. About 8.9% of families and 9.6% of the population were below the poverty line, including 8.4% of those under age 18 and 11.7% of those age 65 or over.

== Education ==
The City of Mertzon is served by the Irion County Independent School District, as are all other parts of the county, and home to the Irion County High School Hornets.

All of Irion County is in the service area of Howard County Junior College District.

== Notable person ==
- Laura Bullion, female Old West outlaw, was born in Knickerbocker

== See also ==
- List of municipalities in Texas
