= Irion County Independent School District =

School district in Texas

Irion County Independent School District is a public school district based in Mertzon, Texas (USA).

The district includes all parts of Irion County. Residents of Sherwood, Mertzon, Barnhart, and some residents of Tom Green County attend the school.

In 2009, the school district was rated "recognized" by the Texas Education Agency.

== Schools ==
- Irion County High School
- Irion County Elementary School
