= List of Farm to Market Roads in Texas (3500–9999) =

- Texas Farm to Market Road and Ranch to Market Road markers

Highway names
- Interstates: Interstate Highway X (IH-X, I-X)
- US Highways: U.S. Highway X (US X)
- State: State Highway X (SH X)
- Loops: Loop X
- Spurs: Spur X
- Recreational: Recreational Road X (RE X)
- Farm or Ranch to Market Roads: Farm to Market Road X (FM X); Ranch to Market Road X (RM X)
- Park Roads: Park Road X (PR X)

System links
- Highways in Texas; Interstate; US; State; Former; Toll; Loops; Spurs; FM/RM; Park; Rec

Farm to Market Roads in Texas are owned and maintained by the Texas Department of Transportation (TxDOT).

== FM 3500 ==
Farm to Market Road 3500
- Location: El Paso County
- Existed: April 26, 1989–October 29, 1998

Farm to Market Road 3500 (FM 3500) was located in El Paso County. No highway currently uses the FM 3500 designation.

FM 3500 was designated on April 26, 1989, from FM 1905 in Anthony south and east to I-10. FM 3500 was cancelled on October 29, 1998, and most of the eastern segment of the route was subsumed by Spur 6.

== FM 3501 ==
Farm to Market Road 3501
- Location: Leon County
- Length: 0.489 mi (787 m)
- Existed: February 27, 1989–present

Farm to Market Road 3501 (FM 3501) is located in Leon County. It runs from FM 39, approximately 3.0 miles (4.8 km) northwest of Jewett, westward to FM 1512.

FM 3501 was designated on February 27, 1989, on the current route.

== FM 3502 ==
Farm to Market Road 3502
- Location: Bexar County
- Length: 0.701 mi (1,128 m)
- Existed: December 30, 1988–April 30, 2020

Farm to Market Road 3502 (FM 3502) was located in Bexar County. It ran from FM 1516 northeast to FM 78 in Converse.

FM 3502 was designated on December 30, 1988, from FM 78 northeast of Converse southwest to FM 1516 as a replacement of a spur of FM 1976. On June 30, 1995, the entire route was transferred to Urban Road 3502 (UR 3502). The designation reverted to FM 3502 with the elimination of the Urban Road system on November 15, 2018. FM 3502 was deleted on April 30, 2020, and jurisdiction was given to the city of Converse.

== FM 3503 ==
Farm to Market Road 3503
- Location: Ector and Midland counties
- Length: 13.166 mi (21.189 km)
- Existed: April 26, 1989–present

Farm to Market Road 3503 (FM 3503) is located in Ector and Midland counties. It runs from I-20 at Grandview Avenue in Odessa south and east to FM 1788 south of Midland.

FM 3503 was designated on April 26, 1989, on its current route.

Junction list

County	Location	mi	km	Destinations	Notes
Ector	Odessa	0.0	0.0	I-20 / Grandview Avenue	I-20 exit 118
Ector		4.3	6.9	Loop 338	
Midland		13.2	21.2	FM 1788 – Midland International Airport	
1.000 mi = 1.609 km; 1.000 km = 0.621 mi

== FM 3504 ==
Farm to Market Road 3504
- Location: Lewisville
- Length: 1.058 mi (1.703 km)
- Existed: May 30, 1990–June 28, 2012

Farm to Market Road 3504 (FM 3504) was located in Lewisville, Denton County.

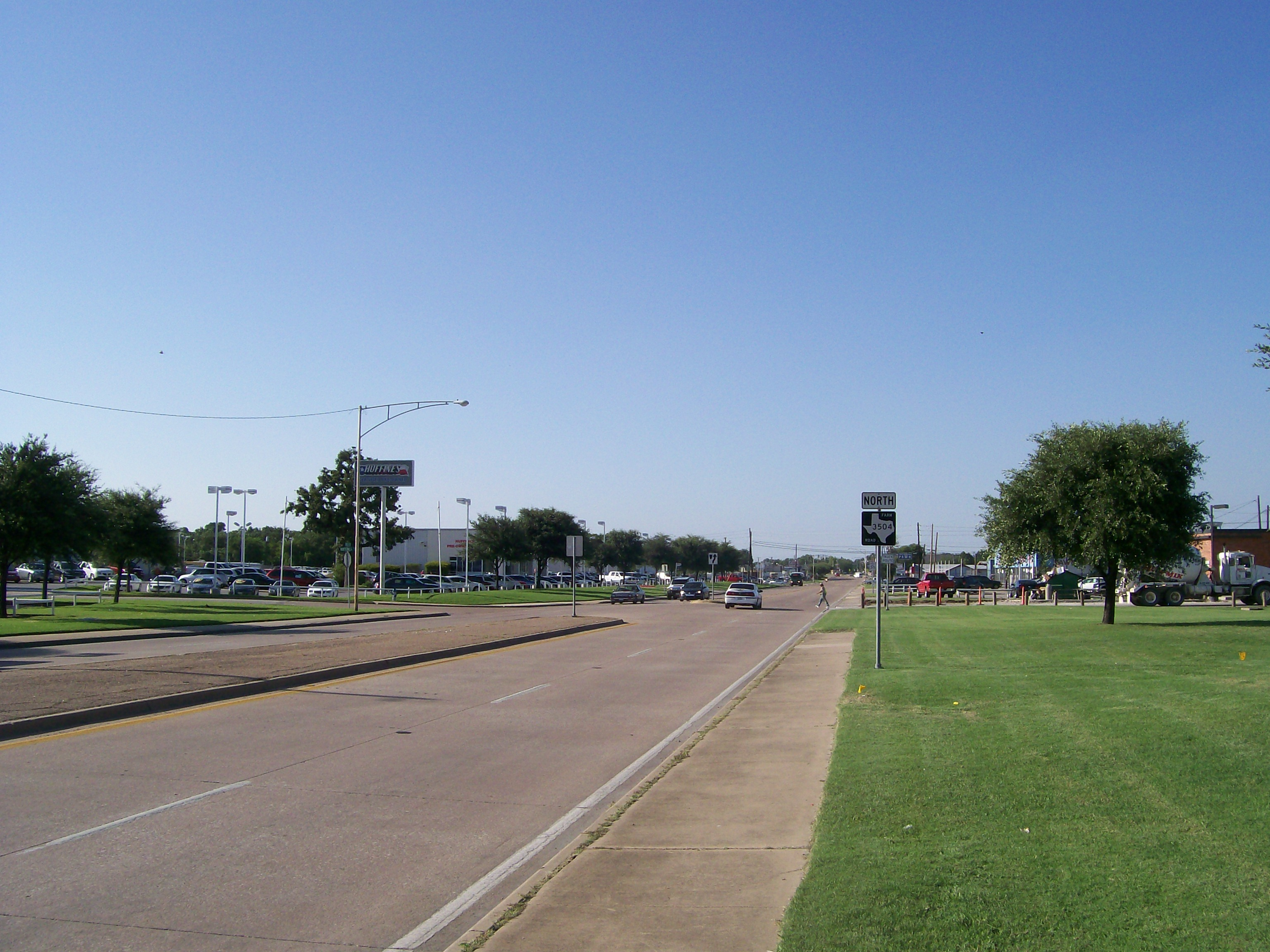
North along FM 3504 from its southern terminus at Bus. SH 121., August 2007

FM 3504 began at an intersection with Texas State Highway 121 Business, the former routing of Texas State Highway 121 through Lewisville, just north of the Interstate 35E (I-35E) freeway. The route traveled north along Mill Street (a four-lane undivided highway for all but a small stretch near the southern terminus), past a variety of older businesses and a school, before state maintenance ended just north of Main Street at an intersection with Church Street. Mill Street continued north under local jurisdiction toward Lewisville Lake.

FM 3504 was originally a spur route of Farm to Market Road 1171 (FM 1171) designated in 1971; the mileage was transferred to the current route number on May 30, 1990. FM 1171 currently ends at I-35E, but historically continued along Main and Church Streets (a pair of one-way streets) through eastern Lewisville to SH 121 (now the business route). That section of FM 1171 was removed from the state highway system in 2003, leaving FM 3504 with a northern terminus that no longer connected to the state highway system.

On June 27, 1995, the designation of the route was internally changed to Urban Road 3504 (UR 3504). On June 28, 2012, the route was removed from the state highway system.

== FM 3505 ==
Farm to Market Road 3505
- Location: Hopkins County
- Length: 1.352 mi (2.176 km)
- Existed: August 29, 1989–present

Farm to Market Road 3505 (FM 3505) is located in Hopkins County. Its southern terminus is at FM 71 north of Sulphur Springs. It runs north for about 1.3 mi (2.1 km) to the entrance to Cooper State Park.

FM 3505 was designated on August 29, 1989, along its current route.

== FM 3506 ==
Farm to Market Road 3506
- Location: Henderson County
- Length: 4.155 mi (6.687 km)
- Existed: 1989–present

Farm to Market Road 3506 (FM 3506) is located in Henderson County. It runs about 4.2 miles (6.8 km) near the western shore of Lake Palestine, from SH 155 in Coffee City west, then northwest, to FM 315.

FM 3506 was designated on August 29, 1989, along the current route, as a replacement for two county roads. However, construction did not begin until 2004. The roadway was opened to traffic in May 2006.

== FM 3507 ==
Farm to Market Road 3507
- Location: Brazoria County
- Existed: August 29, 1989–September 29, 1992

Farm to Market Road 3507 (FM 3507) was located in Brazoria County. No highway currently uses the FM 3507 designation.

FM 3507 was designated on August 29, 1989, from SH 288 northwest of Angleton south and west 2.6 miles (4.2 km) to FM 521. By district request, FM 3507 was cancelled on September 29, 1992, and its mileage was transferred to FM 523.

== FM 3508 ==
Farm to Market Road 3508
- Location: Blanco County
- Length: 5.0 mi (8.0 km)
- Existed: August 29, 1989–present

Farm to Market Road 3508 (FM 3508) is located in Blanco County. The highway runs from RM 962 near Cypress Mill eastward to an intersection with a county road.

FM 3508 was designated in 1989 along the current route.

== FM 3509 ==
Farm to Market Road 3509
- Location: Burnet County
- Length: 5.732 mi (9.225 km)
- Existed: August 29, 1989–present

Farm to Market Road 3509 (FM 3509) is located in Burnet County. It runs from County Road 116 near Inks Lake State Park east to SH 29.

FM 3509 was designated on August 29, 1989, on the current route.

== FM 3510 ==
Farm to Market Road 3510
- Location: Pleasanton, Atasocosa County
- Length: 1.545 mi (2.486 km)
- Existed: August 29, 1989–present

Farm to Market Road 3510 (FM 3510) is a 1.545-mile (2.486 km), north–south state road in southwest Pleasanton, Atascosa County, that connects SH 97 with Farm to Market Road 3350.

FM 3510 was designated on August 29, 1989, on the current route.

== FM 3511 ==
Farm to Market Road 3511
- Location: Bee County
- Existed: August 29, 1989–November 29, 1990

Farm to Market Road 3511 (FM 3511) was a designation proposed for a highway in Bee County. No highway currently uses the FM 3511 designation.

FM 3511 was designated on August 29, 1989, from FM 1349 southwest of Beeville, southeastward approximately 2.6 miles (4.2 km) via Central Avenue, to FM 888. FM 3511 was cancelled on November 29, 1990, by request of the county.

== FM 3512 ==
Farm to Market Road 3512
- Location: San Patricio County
- Length: 2.357 mi (3.793 km)
- Existed: August 29, 1989–present

Farm to Market Road 3512 (FM 3512) is located in San Patricio County. It begins at SH 35 west of Aransas Pass. It runs southeastward, passing McCampbell–Porter Airport, before ending at FM 1069, for a total length of approximately 2.4 miles (3.9 km).

FM 3512 was designated on August 29, 1989, on the current route.

== FM 3513 ==
Farm to Market Road 3513
- Location: Hardin County
- Length: 3.303 mi (5.316 km)
- Existed: August 29, 1989–present

Farm to Market Road 3513 (FM 3513) is located in Hardin County, mostly within the city of Lumberton. Beginning at US 96 south of the city limits, it runs northward approximately 3.2 miles (5.1 km) to Chance Cut Off Road in the central part of the city.

== FM 3514 ==
Farm to Market Road 3514
- Location: Jefferson County
- Length: 1.813 mi (2.918 km)
- Existed: August 29, 1989–present

Farm to Market Road 3514 (FM 3514) is located in Jefferson County. It is designated the Joshua W. Allen, Sr. Highway. FM 3514's western terminus is at Spur 93 (West Port Arthur Road). It runs to the east, passing by the Texas Department of Criminal Justice's Mark W. Stiles Unit, Larry Gist State Jail, and LeBlanc Unit. The route's eastern terminus is at US 69.

FM 3514 was designated on August 29, 1989, along its current route. On June 30, 1995, the entire route was transferred to Urban Road 3514 (UR 3514). The designation reverted to FM 3514 with the elimination of the Urban Road system on November 15, 2018.

== FM 3515 ==
Farm to Market Road 3515
- Location: Webb County
- Length: 23.5 mi (37.8 km)
- Existed: August 29, 1989–present

Farm to Market Road 3515 (FM 3515) is located in Webb County.

FM 3515 was designated on August 29, 1989, along its current route.

== FM 3516 ==
Farm to Market Road 3516
- Location: Collingsworth County
- Length: 0.4 mi (640 m)
- Existed: August 29, 1989–present

Farm to Market Road 3516 (FM 3516) is located in Collingsworth County.

FM 3516 was designated on August 29, 1989, along its current route.

== FM 3517 ==
Farm to Market Road 3517
- Location: Hall County
- Length: 4.648 mi (7.480 km)
- Existed: August 29, 1989–present

Farm to Market Road 3517 (FM 3517) is located in Hall County. Beginning at SH 256 in Lakeview, it runs northward and westward approximately 5.5 miles (8.9 km) to a county road intersection.

FM 3517 was designated on August 29, 1989, along its current route.

== FM 3518 ==
Farm to Market Road 3518
- Location: Brazos County
- Existed: December 14, 1989–February 1, 1991

Farm to Market Road 3518 (FM 3518) was located in Brazos County. There is no highway currently using the FM 3518 designation.

FM 3518 was designated on December 14, 1989, from FM 60 in Bryan/College Station north to FM 1179. By district request, FM 3518 was cancelled on February 1, 1991, and transferred to FM 2154. However, the minute order designating was repealed, as neither the city of Bryan nor College Station accepted the provisions of the minute order designating FM 3518, meaning the extension of FM 2154 was cancelled.

== FM 3519 ==
Farm to Market Road 3519
- Location: Garza County
- Length: 3.409 mi (5.486 km)
- Existed: January 30, 1990–present

Farm to Market Road 3519 (FM 3518) is located in Garza County. It runs from an intersection with FM 2458, approximately 2.5 miles (4.0 km) east of US 84 near Justiceburg, eastward approximately 3.1 miles (5.0 km) to Lake Alan Henry.

FM 3519 was designated on January 30, 1990, along its current route.

== FM 3520 ==
Farm to Market Road 3520
- Location: Sabine County
- Length: 1.855 mi (2.985 km)
- Existed: February 27, 1990–present

Farm to Market Road 3520 (FM 3520) is located in Sabine County. It runs from FM 3382 east of Hemphill, eastward approximately 1.9 miles (3.1 km) to El Camino Bay at Toledo Bend Reservoir.

FM 3520 was designated on February 27, 1990, along its current route.

== FM 3521 ==
Farm to Market Road 3521
- Location: Angelina County
- Length: 0.342 mi (550 m)
- Existed: March 1, 1990–present

Farm to Market Road 3521 (FM 3521) is located in Angelina County. It connects FM 2021 north of Lufkin, westward approximately 0.3 mile to US 59 north of US 59 and US 69 merger.

FM 3521 was designated on March 1, 1990, along its current route, replacing a portion of FM 2021 by district request.

== FM 3522 ==
Farm to Market Road 3522
- Location: Jones and Shackelford counties
- Length: 2.382 mi (3.833 km)
- Existed: April 25, 1990–present

Farm to Market Road 3522 (FM 3522) is located in Jones and Shackelford counties. It runs from FM 1082 north of Abilene, eastward and southward to the intersection of SH 351 and FM 604, a distance of approximately 6.1 miles. It passes the TDCJ's French M. Robertson Unit and John Middleton Unit.

FM 3522 was designated on April 25, 1990, from FM 1082 eastward 2.4 miles (3.9 km) to a county road. The road was extended east and south over two county roads to SH 351 and FM 604 on February 27, 1997.

== FM 3523 ==
Farm to Market Road 3523
- Location: Lubbock County
- Length: 4.16 mi (6.69 km)
- Existed: June 21, 1990–present

Farm to Market Road 3523 (FM 3523) is located in Lubbock County.

FM 3523 begins at an intersection with FM 835/FM 1729 east of Lubbock. The highway runs east, passing just north of Ransom Canyon and Buffalo Springs Lake. FM 3523 leaves the Ransom Canyon area and ends at an intersection with FM 400 southeast of Roosevelt.

FM 3523 was designated on June 21, 1990, along its current route when a section of County Road 6900 was upgraded.

== FM 3524 ==
Farm to Market Road 3524
- Location: Denton County
- Length: 1.814 mi (2.919 km)
- Existed: May 23, 1990–present

Farm to Market Road 3524 (FM 3524) is located in Aubrey in Denton County. Beginning at FM 428 (Main Street), it runs northeastward approximately 1.9 miles (3.1 km) along North Sherman Drive to US 377.

FM 3524 was designated on May 23, 1990, along its current route. Its mileage was transferred from FM Spur 428.

== FM 3525 ==
Farm to Market Road 3525
- Location: Mitchell County
- Length: 2.383 mi (3.835 km)
- Existed: April 28, 1994–present

Farm to Market Road 3525 (FM 3525) is located in Mitchell County. It runs approximately 2.4 miles (3.9 km), from West 10th Street in Colorado City, northwest, crossing I-20, and northeastward to SH 208. It passes the Texas Department of Criminal Justice's Daniel Webster Wallace Unit and Dick Ware Transfer Facility, and Mitchell County Hospital.

FM 3525 was designated on April 28, 1994, from West 10th Street to I-20. It was extended northeast to SH 208 on December 17, 2009.

== FM 3526 ==
Farm to Market Road 3526
- Location: Frio County
- Existed: July 26, 1990–September 26, 1990

Farm to Market Road 3526 (FM 3526) was located in Frio County.

FM 3526 was designated on July 26, 1990, along County Road 156 at Hondo Creek for a bridge replacement project. The route was cancelled when the project was complete, and is now County Road 1301.

== FM 3527 ==
Farm to Market Road 3527
- Location: Bowie County
- Length: 2.18 mi (3.51 km)
- Existed: March 26, 1991–present

Farm to Market Road 3527 (FM 3527) is located in Texarkana. The highway is known locally as Leopard Drive.

FM 3527 begins at an intersection with FM 989 just outside of the Texarkana city limits. The highway briefly travels in an east direction before turning north at Stipp Road. The highway enters into Texarkana just south of a junction with Loop 151. FM 3527 travels through a rural area of the city's southwest side before ending at an intersection with SH 93.

FM 3527 was designated on March 26, 1991, along the current route. The entire highway was internally redesignated as Urban Road 3527 (UR 3527) on June 27, 1995. The designation reverted to FM 3527 with the elimination of the Urban Road system on November 15, 2018.

== FM 3528 ==
Farm to Market Road 3528
- Location: Potter County
- Existed: April 30, 1991–July 29, 1991

Farm to Market Road 3528 (FM 3528) was possibly a designation which was proposed but never implemented for the roadway connecting FM 1912 to FM 683 in Potter County. This proposal was discarded 90 days later as plans for the Pantex Plant were changed.

== FM 3529 ==
Farm to Market Road 3529
- Location: McLennan County
- Length: 0.451 mi (726 m)
- Existed: August 26, 1998–present

Farm to Market Road 3529 (FM 3529) is located in McLennan County. It runs from SH 164, in Mart as North Front Street, northwestward and southwestward to TJJD McLennan County State Juvenile Correctional Facility, a distance of approx. 0.5 mile.

FM 3529 was designated on August 26, 1998, on the current route.

== FM 3530 ==
Farm to Market Road 3530
- Location: Wood County
- Length: 0.7 mi (1,100 m)
- Existed: August 25, 1994–present

Farm to Market Road 3530 (FM 3530) is located in Wood County. It runs from FM 852 in Winnsboro, southwestward approximately 0.7 mile passing Winnsboro Municipal Airport to TDCJ Clyde M Johnston prison facility.

FM 3530 was designated on August 25, 1994, on the current route.

== FM 3531 ==
Farm to Market Road 3531
- Location: Pecos County
- Length: 9.0 mi (14.5 km)
- Existed: October 28, 1999–present

Farm to Market Road 3531 (FM 3531) is a proposed route that is designated in Pecos County, running approximately 9 miles (14 km) along CR 130 (Old Alpine Highway), from Spur 194 southwestward to FM 2037.

FM 3531 was designated on October 28, 1999, along the current route. As of 2022, the roadway has not been upgraded and is not under TxDOT maintenance.

== FM 3532 ==
Farm to Market Road 3532
- Location: Winkler County
- Length: 1.1 mi (1.8 km)
- Existed: October 28, 1999–present

Farm to Market Road 3532 (FM 3532) is a designated truck bypass route on the east side of Kermit, running approximately 1.1 miles (1.8 km) along CR 313, from SH 115 southeastward to SH 302.

FM 3532 was designated on October 28, 1999, along the current route. The proposed deletion of the route was deferred on October 30, 2003. As of 2022, it is unsigned and not under TxDOT maintenance.

== FM 3533 ==
Farm to Market Road 3533
- Location: McCulloch County
- Length: 1.2 mi (1.9 km)
- Existed: July 27, 2000–present

Farm to Market Road 3533 (FM 3533) is located in McCulloch County. It runs from FM 714 northeastward to US 190, a distance of approximately 1.2 miles.

East side of Brady, TX.

FM 3533 was designated on July 27, 2000, on its current route, along a county road which was briefly part of FM 714.

== FM 3534 ==
Farm to Market Road 3534
- Location: Shelby County
- Existed: March 30, 2000–July 29, 2004

Farm to Market Road 3534 (FM 3534) was located in Shelby County.

FM 3534 was designated from US 96 in Center northwest 1.0 mile (1.6 km) along Old Timpson Road to a point west of Center. On July 29, 2004, FM 3534 was cancelled and returned to the city of Center.

== FM 3535 ==
Farm to Market Road 3535
- Location: Camp County
- Length: 2.2 mi (3.5 km)
- Existed: June 24, 1999–December 17, 2015

Farm to Market Road 3535 (FM 3535) was located in Camp County. No highway currently uses the FM 3535 designation.

FM 3535 was designated on June 24, 1999, from US 271, 1.0 mile (1.6 km) south of the Titus–Camp county line, southwest 2.2 miles (3.5 km) to FM 1520. On December 17, 2015, FM 3535 was redesignated Loop 255.

== FM 3536 ==
Farm to Market Road 3536
- Location: Lampasas and Coryell counties
- Length: 7.55 mi (12.15 km)
- Existed: September 28, 2000–present

Farm to Market Road 3536 (FM 3536) is located in Lampasas and Coryell counties.

FM 3536 was designated on September 28, 2000, along its current route.

== FM 3537 ==
Farm to Market Road 3537
- Location: Collin County
- Length: 4.089 mi (6.581 km)
- Existed: January 31, 2002–present

Farm to Market Road 3537 (FM 3537) is located in Collin County, entirely within the city of Frisco. It is a redesignated remnant of what used to be FM 720. FM 3537 is a suburban road that begins at SH 289 (Preston Road) in the center of Frisco. It travels eastward to its terminus at FM 2478 (Custer Road) on the border between Frisco and McKinney. The road is designated as Main Street.

FM 3537 was originally part of FM 720, which was designated in Collin County on October 17, 1947. FM 720 replaced an old alignment of SH 24 between SH 289 and US 75, connecting Frisco and McKinney. On September 9, 1955, FM 720 was extended westward through downtown Frisco and into Denton County, to the new alignment of SH 24 (which would become US 380 in 1977), replacing FM 388 and portions of FM 423. FM 720 was truncated on August 30, 2001, when the portion from FM 2478 to US 75 was removed from the state highway system. FM 720 was truncated further on January 31, 2002, when the portion from FM 423 to SH 289 was removed from the state highway system, and the segment of FM 720 in east Frisco between SH 289 and FM 2478 was retained on the system and redesignated as FM 3537.

== FM 3538 ==
Farm to Market Road 3538
- Location: Austin County
- Length: 3.507 mi (5.644 km)
- Existed: April 24, 2003–present

Farm to Market Road 3538 (FM 3538) is located in Austin County. It runs from US 90 southward to FM 3013.

FM 3538 was designated on April 24, 2003, on its current route.

== FM 3539 ==
Farm to Market Road 3539
- Location: El Paso County
- Existed: June 30, 2005–February 23, 2012

Farm to Market Road 3539 (FM 3539) was possibly a designation which was proposed but never implemented for the roadway connecting SH 20 to the U.S.–Mexico border at the former Fabens–Caseta International Bridge in El Paso County. Under the proposal, FM 1109 was to have been cancelled upon the opening of this Farm to Market Road. On May 27, 2010, FM 1109 was cancelled. FM 3380 was extended southwest over the road on February 23, 2012, as that route's proposed routing was modified pending the construction of the Tornillo–Guadalupe International Bridge.

== FM 3540 ==
Farm to Market Road 3540
- Location: Cherokee County
- Length: 2.10 mi (3.38 km)
- Existed: 2005–present

Farm to Market Road 3540 (FM 3540) is a proposed route in Cherokee County that is proposed to run approximately 2.1 miles (3.4 km) from an intersection with SH 135 in Tecula, east to the vicinity of a future lake, Lake Columbia.

FM 3540 was designated on July 28, 2005, along the proposed route.

== FM 3541 ==
Farm to Market Road 3541
- Location: Culberson County
- Length: 6.189 mi (9.960 km)
- Existed: January 26, 2006–August 27, 2020

Farm to Market Road 3541 (FM 3541) was located in Culberson County in West Texas. The southern terminus of FM 3541 was at Rustler Springs Road in unincorporated Culberson County. The route traveled north for approximately 6.2 miles before ending at RM 652.

The current FM 3541 was added to the state highway system as a part of FM 2185 in 1968. On April 30, 1991, the central portion of FM 2185 was returned to county maintenance, leaving a gap in FM 2185. On January 26, 2006, this northern stretch of FM 2185 was renumbered FM 3541, as another section of FM 2185 was also returned to county maintenance. On August 27, 2020, FM 3541 was cancelled and became part of FM 2185 because the deleted portions of FM 2185 were restored.

== FM 3549 ==
Farm to Market Road 3549
- Location: Rockwall County
- Length: 3.5 mi (5.6 km)
- Existed: September 24, 2009–present

Farm to Market Road 3549 (FM 3549) is located in Rockwall County. It runs from FM 552 northeast of Rockwall south to I-30.

FM 3549 was designated on September 24, 2009, on the current route as a replacement of a section of FM 549.

== FM 3550 ==
Farm to Market Road 3550
- Location: Cameron County
- Length: 4.4 mi (7.1 km)
- Existed: April 29, 2010–present

Farm to Market Road 3550 (FM 3550) is located in Cameron County. It runs from 0.4 miles (0.64 km) north of Dockberry Road to FM 3068.

FM 3550 was designated on April 29, 2010, on the current route as a replacement of a section of FM 1419.

== FM 3551 ==
Farm to Market Road 3551
- Location: Cameron County
- Length: 0.8 mi (1,300 m)
- Existed: April 29, 2010–present

Farm to Market Road 3551 (FM 3551) is located in Cameron County. It runs from a point 0.7 miles (1.1 km) south of SH 4 to SH 4.

FM 3551 was designated on April 29, 2010, on the current route as a replacement of a section of FM 1419.

== FM 4000 ==
Farm to Market Road 4000
- Location: Titus County
- Length: 4.8 mi (7.7 km)
- Existed: March 28, 2013–present

Farm to Market Road 4000 (FM 4000) is a 4.8-mile (7.7 km) highway that is located near Mount Pleasant in Titus County.

FM 4000 begins at a junction with US 271 in southern Mount Pleasant. The highway runs in a northeast direction and turns east near Bus. US 271 (Jefferson Avenue). FM 4000 intersects Bus. US 271 near a retail center in the southern part of the city and passes by a subdivision before leaving the city. The highway travels in a mostly eastern direction and ends at an intersection with FM 1735. The section of FM 4000 between US 271 and Jefferson Avenue is locally known as Marvin Priefert Highway, while the section between Jefferson Avenue and the Mount Pleasant city limits is known as Jerry Boatner Parkway.

FM 4000 was designated on March 28, 2013, along the current route.

Junction list

The entire route is in Titus County.

Location	mi	km	Destinations	Notes
Mount Pleasant	0.0	0.0	US 271 – Pittsburg, Paris	Interchange
Mount Pleasant	0.9	1.4	Bus. US 271 (Jefferson Avenue) – Mount Pleasant, Pittsburg	
	3.9	6.3	FM 2348	
	4.8	7.7	FM 1735	
1.000 mi = 1.609 km; 1.000 km = 0.621 mi

== FM 7550 ==
Farm to Market Road 7550
- Location: Starr County
- Existed: May 27, 2010–November 18, 2010

Farm to Market Road 7550 (FM 7550) was located in Starr County. No highway currently uses the FM 7550 designation.

FM 7550 was designated on May 27, 2010, from FM 755 northeast of Rio Grande City, southward 1.9 miles (3.1 km) to US 83, at an intersection 0.6 miles (0.97 km) east of Pete Diaz Boulevard. FM 7550 was cancelled six months later and replaced with FM 755 when it was rerouted; the old route of FM 755 was returned to the city and county.
