= Greenwood High School (Texas) =

Location
- 2700 FM 1379; Midland County (Midland address), Texas 79706; United States; 32°1′25″N 101°53′41″W

Information
- Type: Public, co-educational
- School district: Greenwood Independent School District
- Principal: Stacy Jones
- Teaching staff: 58.26 (FTE)
- Grades: 9-12
- Enrollment: 848 (2023–2024)
- Student to teacher ratio: 14.56
- Colors: Columbia blue, navy, and white
- Athletics conference: 2-4A
- Nickname: Rangers
- Website: www.greenwood.esc18.net/195896_2

GREENWOOD High School is a public, co-educational 9-12 secondary school in the Greenwood area, in unincorporated Midland County, Texas, with a Midland postal address. It is a part of the Greenwood Independent School District.

== Demographics ==
The demographic breakdown of the 527 students enrolled in 2013-14 was:

- Male - 55.8%
- Female - 44.2%
- Native American/Alaskan - 0.2%
- Asian/Pacific islanders - 0.2%
- Black - 1.3%
- Hispanic - 37.4%
- White - 59.4%
- Multiracial - 1.5%

21.6% of the students were eligible for free or reduced lunch.

== Athletics ==
Greenwood High School fields teams in football, baseball, basketball, volleyball, cross country, tennis, golf, softball, powerlifting, and track and field . They compete in UIL district 4A.

== Mascot ==
The mascot for Greenwood High is the Ranger man. He is commonly seen with 2 revolvers and a cowboy hat. Recently, a female counterpart has been with the Ranger man named the Rangerette.

== Welding ==
GISD has had a welding team for quite a long time. The leader of the team is the welding instructor, Terryel Gloden.
