= List of Farm to Market Roads in Texas (2400–2499) =

- Texas Farm to Market Road and Ranch to Market Road markers

Highway names
- Interstates: Interstate Highway X (IH-X, I-X)
- US Highways: U.S. Highway X (US X)
- State: State Highway X (SH X)
- Loops: Loop X
- Spurs: Spur X
- Recreational: Recreational Road X (RE X)
- Farm or Ranch to Market Roads: Farm to Market Road X (FM X); Ranch to Market Road X (RM X)
- Park Roads: Park Road X (PR X)

System links
- Highways in Texas; Interstate; US; State; Former; Toll; Loops; Spurs; FM/RM; Park; Rec

Farm to Market Roads in Texas are owned and maintained by the Texas Department of Transportation (TxDOT).

== RM 2400 ==
Ranch to Market Road 2400
- Location: Pecos and Terrell counties
- Length: 39.122 mi (62.961 km)
- Existed: November 21, 1956–present

Ranch to Market Road 2400 (RM 2400) is located in Pecos and Terrell counties. Its western terminus is in Pecos County at US 285, approximately 4.3 miles (6.9 km) north of the Terrell County line. The route travels northeast and crosses into Terrell County, intersecting RM 2886, before reaching its eastern terminus at SH 349.

RM 2400 was designated on November 21, 1956, running 12.5 miles (20.1 km) to the northeast from its current western terminus. It was extended northeast another 13.0 miles (20.9 km) on October 31, 1958, and another 7.0 miles (11.3 km) on September 27, 1960. RM 2400 was extended another 5.5 miles (8.9 km) eastward to its current eastern terminus on September 20, 1961.

== RM 2401 ==
Ranch to Market Road 2401
- Location: Upton, Reagan, and Glasscock counties
- Length: 36.055 mi (58.025 km)
- Existed: November 21, 1956 (Note: RM 2401 was originally designated as FM 2401 from 1956 to 1967.)–present

Ranch to Market Road 2401 (RM 2401) is located in Upton, Reagan, and Glasscock counties.

RM 2401 begins at an intersection with SH 349 between Rankin and Midland. The highway runs eastward before turning north at County Road 126 just past RM 2594. RM 2401 runs north before turning towards the northeast at FM 3095 in Midkiff. The highway runs northeast and enters briefly enters Reagan County before entering Glasscock County near RM 1357. RM 2401 intersects SH 137 between Stanton and Big Lake and continues to run for approximately another 11 miles (18 km) before ending at RM 33 about 10 miles (16 km) south of Garden City.

RM 2401 was originally designated as Farm to Market Road 2401 (FM 2401) on November 21, 1956, running from SH 349 in Upton County to the Reagan County line. The designation was changed to RM 2401 on November 26, 1969, and the route was extended eastward to RM 1357. On September 5, 1973, RM 2401 was extended to RM 1800 (now SH 137), and it officially replaced FM 2874 from that intersection to RM 33 on September 20 of that year.

Junction list

County	Location	mi	km	Destinations	Notes
Upton		0.0	0.0	SH 349 – Rankin, Midland	
Upton		6.0	9.7	RM 2594 south	
Upton	Midkiff	13.0	20.9	FM 3095 north	
Reagan	No major junctions				
Glasscock		19.0	30.6	RM 1357 – Greenwood	
Glasscock		25.1	40.4	SH 137 – Stanton, Big Lake	
Glasscock		29.1	46.8	RM 3093 south	
Glasscock		36.1	58.1	RM 33 – Garden City, Big Lake	
1.000 mi = 1.609 km; 1.000 km = 0.621 mi

== FM 2402 ==
Farm to Market Road 2402
- Location: Concho County
- Length: 18.800 mi (30.256 km)
- Existed: November 21, 1956–present

== FM 2403 ==
Farm to Market Road 2403
- Location: Brazoria County
- Length: 4.542 mi (7.310 km)
- Existed: May 6, 1964–present

Farm to Market Road 2403 (FM 2403) is located in Brazoria County. It runs northward from FM 2917 near Liverpool to SH 35/future SH 99 in southern Alvin.

FM 2403 was designated on May 6, 1964, along the current route.

=== RM 2403 (1956) ===
Ranch to Market Road 2403
- Location: Crockett County
- Existed: November 21, 1956–February 1957

Ranch to Market Road 2403 (RM 2403) was designated in Crockett County on November 21, 1956, from RM 33 west toward Iraan to the Pecos River. This designation was cancelled 90 days later.

=== FM 2403 (1957) ===
Farm to Market Road 2403
- Location: Wise County
- Existed: October 31, 1957–March 27, 1963

FM 2403 was designated in Wise County on October 31, 1957, from US 81 north of Decatur northwest 5.3 miles (8.5 km) to a road intersection. On September 27, 1960, the road was extended 1.9 miles (3.1 km) to FM 1810. FM 2403 was cancelled on March 27, 1963, and transferred to FM 1810 when that route was rerouted and extended.

== FM 2404 ==
Farm to Market Road 2404
- Location: Taylor and Jones counties
- Length: 8.7 mi (14.0 km)
- Existed: November 1, 1959–present

Farm to Market Road 2404 (FM 2404) is located in Taylor and Jones counties. It runs from US 83 north of Abilene to FM 605.

FM 2404 was designated on October 2, 1959, from US 83 northwest to the Jones County line as a replacement for FM 1605. On November 24, 1959, the route was extended northwest to FM 605.

=== FM 2404 / RM 2404 (1956) ===
Farm to Market Road 2404
- Location: Reagan County
- Existed: November 21, 1956–October 31, 1957

Ranch to Market Road 2404
- Location: Reagan County
- Existed: October 31, 1957–December 2, 1958

FM 2404 was previously designated in Reagan County on November 21, 1956, from FM 33, 12.5 miles (20.1 km) north of Big Lake, west and northwest via Stiles, at a distance of 12.5 miles (20.1 km). On October 31, 1957, the route was extended to the Glasscock County line, and the designation changed to Ranch to Market Road 2404 (RM 2404). RM 2404 was cancelled on December 2, 1958, and its mileage was transferred to RM 1800 (now SH 137).

== FM 2405 ==
Farm to Market Road 2405
- Location: Runnels and Taylor counties
- Length: 9.272 mi (14.922 km)
- Existed: November 21, 1956–present

== FM 2406 ==
Farm to Market Road 2406
- Location: Runnels County
- Length: 0.998 mi (1,606 m)
- Existed: 1956–present

== FM 2407 ==
Farm to Market Road 2407
- Location: Haskell County
- Length: 9.835 mi (15.828 km)
- Existed: 1956–present

== FM 2408 ==
Farm to Market Road 2408
- Location: Shackelford and Stephens counties
- Length: 6.469 mi (10.411 km)
- Existed: 1956–present

== FM 2409 ==
Farm to Market Road 2409
- Location: Bell County
- Length: 5.479 mi (8.818 km)
- Existed: 1956–present

== FM 2410 ==
Farm to Market Road 2410
- Location: Bell County
- Length: 11.181 mi (17.994 km)
- Existed: November 21, 1956–present

Farm to Market Road 2410 (FM 2410) is located in Bell County. It runs 11 miles from Bus. US 190 and Martin Luther King Jr. Boulevard in Killeen through Knights Way In Harker Heights and ends in Belton at the corner of F.M. 2410 and Simmons Road.

FM 2410 was designated on November 21, 1956, from FM 439 east of Killeen to US 190 (later Loop 518, now BU 190-F). On October 31, 1958, the road was extended east 5.7 miles (9.2 km) to a road intersection. On May 6, 1964, the road was extended east 5.0 miles (8.0 km) to Simmons Road. On January 31, 2002, the section from FM 439 to BU 190-F became part of rerouted FM 439, while the section of FM 439 west of FM 2410 was removed from the state highway system or transferred to SH 195.

== FM 2411 ==
Farm to Market Road 2411
- Location: Dawson County
- Length: 3.26 mi (5.25 km)
- Existed: April 8, 1964–present

Farm to Market Road 2411 (FM 2411) is located in Dawson County. It runs from US 87 at Arvana eastward 3.2 miles (5.1 km) to FM 178.

FM 2411 was designated on April 8, 1964, along the current route as a renumbering of FM 180, to avoid confusion with the nearby US 180.

=== FM 2411 (1956) ===
Farm to Market Road 2411
- Location: Bosque, Hill, and McLennan counties
- Existed: November 21, 1956–July 24, 1963

A previous route numbered FM 2411 was designated in Bosque County on November 21, 1956, from FM 56 northeast of Cayote, east 5.9 miles (9.5 km) to the Brazos River at Smiths Bend. On October 31, 1957, the road was extended east 4.0 miles (6.4 km) into Hill County to FM 1244 (now FM 933). On September 27, 1960, the designation was extended east 7.9 miles (12.7 km) to I-35 and FM 1858 south of West in McLennan County. FM 2411 was cancelled on July 24, 1963, and transferred to FM 2114.

== FM 2412 ==
Farm to Market Road 2412
- Location: Coryell County
- Length: 9.85 mi (15.85 km)
- Existed: 1956–present

== FM 2413 ==
Farm to Market Road 2413
- Location: Falls and Robertson counties
- Length: 7.612 mi (12.250 km)
- Existed: 1956–present

== FM 2414 ==
Farm to Market Road 2414
- Location: Hamilton County
- Length: 8.507 mi (13.691 km)
- Existed: 1956–present

== FM 2415 ==
Farm to Market Road 2415
- Location: Johnson County
- Length: 6.253 mi (10.063 km)
- Existed: October 31, 1958–present

=== FM 2415 (1956) ===
Farm to Market Road 2415
- Location: Limestone County
- Existed: November 21, 1956–November 27, 1957

A previous route numbered FM 2415 was designated on November 21, 1956, from US 84 in Mexia, southeast 6.9 miles (11.1 km) to the Freestone County line. FM 2415 was cancelled on November 27, 1957, and transferred to FM 1365.

== FM 2416 ==
Farm to Market Road 2416
- Location: McLennan County
- Length: 9.338 mi (15.028 km)
- Existed: 1956–present

== FM 2417 ==
Farm to Market Road 2417
- Location: McLennan County
- Length: 1.458 mi (2.346 km)
- Existed: 1956–present

== FM 2418 ==
Farm to Market Road 2418
- Location: McLennan County
- Length: 2.584 mi (4.159 km)
- Existed: 1956–present

== FM 2419 ==
Farm to Market Road 2419
- Location: Anderson County
- Length: 7.334 mi (11.803 km)
- Existed: 1956–present

== FM 2420 ==
Farm to Market Road 2420
- Location: Cherokee and Rusk counties
- Length: 3.213 mi (5.171 km)
- Existed: 1956–present

Farm to Market Road 2420 (FM 2420) is a 3.213-mile (5.171 km) route in Cherokee and Rusk counties that connects FM 235 southeast of New Summerfield and FM 839 north of Reklaw.

FM 2420 was designated on November 21, 1956, on the current route.

== FM 2421 ==
Farm to Market Road 2421
- Location: Parker County
- Length: 11.739 mi (18.892 km)
- Existed: October 31, 1957–present

=== FM 2421 (original route) ===
Farm to Market Road 2421
- Location: Henderson County
- Existed: November 21, 1956–1957

The original FM 2421 was planned in Henderson County, from FM 607 at Leagueville east 5.3 miles to FM 314. FM 2421 was cancelled by 1957, as it was already part of FM 317.

== FM 2422 ==
Farm to Market Road 2422
- Location: Wood County
- Length: 2.704 mi (4.352 km)
- Existed: 1956–present

== FM 2423 ==
Farm to Market Road 2423
- Location: Houston County
- Length: 6.022 mi (9.691 km)
- Existed: 1956–present

== RM 2424 ==
Ranch to Market Road 2424
- Location: Culberson County
- Length: 13.700 mi (22.048 km)
- Existed: August 29, 1958–present

Ranch to Market Road 2424 (RM 2424) is located in south Culberson County. RM 2424 begins at I-10 in Kent, and maintenance ends in south-eastern Culberson County, where it continues as Jones-Kent Road. It is the northern continuation of SH 118 which ends at Interstate 10. RM 2424 was first assigned in 1958 and was extended to its current route in 1959.

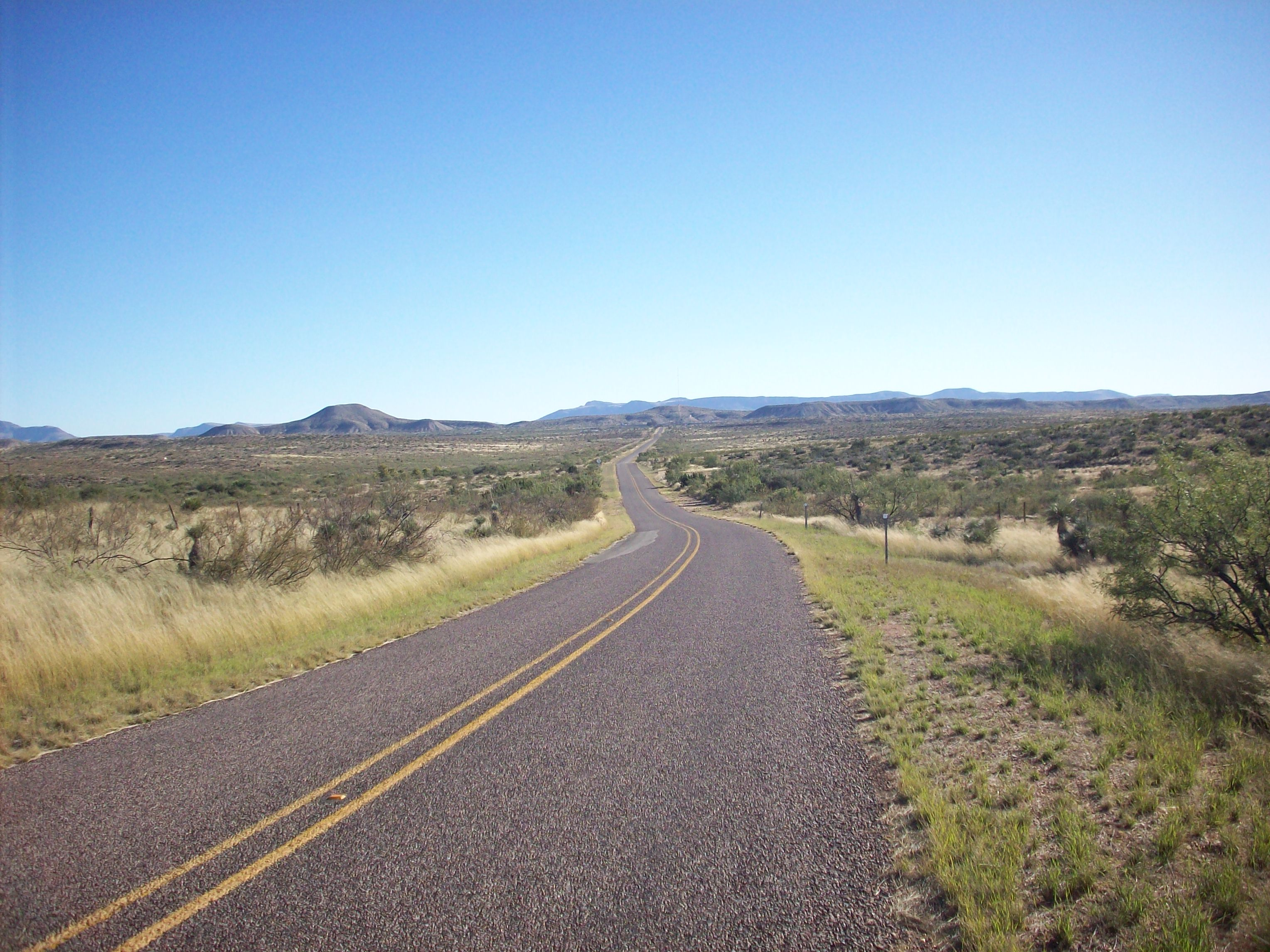
Ranch to Market Road 2424 from the foothills of the Apache Mountains looking south toward Kent, Texas in the distance. In the far distance are the Davis Mountains.

Ranch to Market Road 2424 begins at Interstate 10 in Kent. The road, known as Cessna Street, crosses the Union Pacific Railroad, and goes north through Kent. It runs parallel to the Kent Draw, intersecting with Iron Mountain Road at about the 5 mile mark. It continues northwest, crossing Hurds Pass Draw and intersecting with several ranch roads, before ending at Jones-Kent Road. The road continues as Jones-Kent Road. Road 2424 has the town's only store, Kent Mercantile, which includes a gas station. The mercantile store was closed in January 2011. The post office is still open, serving the nearby ranch community. There is only one family left in Kent.

RM 2424 was assigned on August 29, 1958, from U.S. Highway 80 (now Interstate 10) to Iron Mountain Road. The route was extended 9.0 miles (14.5 km) to its current route on November 24, 1959.

=== FM 2424 (1956) ===
Farm to Market Road 2424
- Location: Nacogdoches County
- Existed: November 21, 1956–April 24, 1958

Farm to Market Road 2424 (FM 2424) was designated on November 21, 1956, as a route from FM 1638 northwest of Nacogdoches northwest 6.0 miles (9.7 km) to Red Flat church. On October 31, 1957, FM 2424 was extended northwest 6.8 miles (10.9 km) to FM 225. It was replaced by FM 343 on April 24, 1958.

== FM 2425 ==
Farm to Market Road 2425
- Location: Hood County
- Length: 6.16 mi (9.91 km)
- Existed: October 31, 1958–present

Farm to Market Road 2425 (FM 2425) is a 6.160-mile (9.914 km) route in southeastern Hood County. It forms an eastern loop off SH 144 and passes through the unincorporated community of Mambrino.

=== FM 2425 (1956) ===
Farm to Market Road 2425
- Location: Polk County
- Length: 4.5 mi (7.2 km)
- Existed: November 21, 1956–December 16, 1957

A previous route numbered FM 2425 was designated on November 21, 1956, in Polk County, from US 59, 2.5 miles (4.0 km) south of the Neches River, east 4.5 miles (7.2 km) to Damascus Church. FM 2425 was cancelled on December 16, 1957, and transferred to FM 1987.

== FM 2426 ==
Farm to Market Road 2426
- Location: Sabine County
- Length: 9.308 mi (14.980 km)
- Existed: November 21, 1956–present

Farm to Market Road 2426 (FM 2426) is located in Sabine County, mainly within the Sabine National Forest. Its western terminus is at FM 1 in Pineland. Its eastern terminus is at SH 87 in the community of Yellowpine.

FM 2426 was designated on November 21, 1956, along its current route.

== FM 2427 ==
Farm to Market Road 2427
- Location: Shelby County
- Length: 3.618 mi (5.823 km)
- Existed: 1956–present

== FM 2428 ==
Farm to Market Road 2428
- Location: Shelby County
- Length: 4.256 mi (6.849 km)
- Existed: 1956–present

== FM 2429 ==
Farm to Market Road 2429
- Location: Austin County
- Length: 3.56 mi (5.73 km)
- Existed: 1956–present

== FM 2430 ==
Farm to Market Road 2430
- Location: Bastrop County
- Length: 0.872 mi (1,403 m)
- Existed: June 28, 1963–present

Farm to Market Road 2430 (FM 2430) is located in Bastrop County. It runs from FM 812 to the former Nike/Hercules Control Center.

FM 2430 was designated on June 28, 1963, on the current route.

=== FM 2430 (1956) ===
Farm to Market Road 2430
- Location: Harris County
- Existed: November 21, 1956–May 24, 1963

A previous route numbered FM 2430 was designated on November 21, 1956, from US 75 (now I-45), 0.1 miles (0.16 km) south of Halls Bayou, west to FM 149 (now SH 249). On December 10, 1959, the route of FM 2430 was transferred to FM 149 while a section of FM 149, from FM 2430 to US 75, was transferred to FM 2430. FM 2430 was cancelled on May 24, 1963, and removed from the highway system as FM 149 provided a more direct route for traffic than FM 2430.

== FM 2431 ==
Farm to Market Road 2431
- Location: Matagorda County
- Length: 8.82 mi (14.19 km)
- Existed: 1956–present

== FM 2432 ==
Farm to Market Road 2432
- Location: Montgomery County
- Length: 5.085 mi (8.184 km)
- Existed: November 21, 1956–present

Farm to Market Road 2432 (FM 2432) is located in Montgomery County. It runs from SH 75 in Willis to FM 1484 in Northeast Conroe.

FM 2432 was designated on November 21, 1956, on its current route.

== FM 2433 ==
Farm to Market Road 2433
- Location: Calhoun County
- Length: 4.224 mi (6.798 km)
- Existed: 1956–present

== FM 2434 ==
Farm to Market Road 2434
- Location: Colorado County
- Length: 12.294 mi (19.785 km)
- Existed: 1956–present

== FM 2435 ==
Farm to Market Road 2435
- Location: Nacogdoches County
- Length: 2.665 mi (4.289 km)
- Existed: July 15, 1988–present

=== FM 2435 (1956) ===
Farm to Market Road 2435
- Location: DeWitt County
- Existed: November 21, 1956–May 6, 1957

The first use of the FM 2435 designation was in DeWitt County, from SH 119, 2 miles (3.2 km) south of Yorktown, to a point 5.1 miles (8.2 km) southeast. FM 2435 was cancelled six months later and transferred to FM 884.

=== FM 2435 (1957) ===
Farm to Market Road 2435
- Location: Johnson County
- Existed: October 31, 1957–December 20, 1984

The next use of the FM 2435 designation was in Johnson County, from SH 171 near Godley to a point 5.6 miles (9.0 km) north. On May 6, 1964, the road was extended north 3.7 miles (6.0 km) to the Tarrant County line. FM 2435 was cancelled on December 20, 1984, by district request and transferred to FM 2331.

== FM 2436 ==
Farm to Market Road 2436
- Location: Fayette County
- Length: 1.99 mi (3.20 km)
- Existed: 1956–present

== FM 2437 ==
Farm to Market Road 2437
- Location: Lavaca and Colorado counties
- Length: 13.663 mi (21.988 km)
- Existed: 1956–present

== FM 2438 ==
Farm to Market Road 2438
- Location: Guadalupe County
- Length: 6.107 mi (9.828 km)
- Existed: September 27, 1960–present

Farm to Market Road 2438 (FM 2438) is located in Guadalupe County.

FM 2438 begins at an intersection with US 90 Alt. between Seguin and Belmont. The highway travels north to a diamond interchange with I-10 at exit 617 before continuing north to end US 90 in Kingsbury. The roadway continues beyond this point as Kingsbury Road.

The current FM 2438 was designated on September 27, 1960, running from US 90 in Kingsbury to the proposed location of I-10 at a distance of 2.6 miles (4.2 km). The highway was extended 6.6 miles (10.6 km) to US 90 Alt. on July 11, 1968.

=== FM 2438 (1956) ===
Farm to Market Road 2438
- Location: Victoria County
- Length: 4.0 mi (6.4 km)
- Existed: November 21, 1956–October 31, 1958

A previous route numbered FM 2438 was designated in Victoria County on November 21, 1956, running from US 59 and Ben Wilson Street to Foster Air Force Base (now Victoria Regional Airport) at a distance of 4.0 miles (6.4 km). The designation was cancelled on October 31, 1958, due to the anticipated closure of the base, which occurred in December of that year.

== FM 2439 ==
Farm to Market Road 2439
- Location: Comal and Hays counties
- Length: 7.057 mi (11.357 km)
- Existed: November 21, 1956–present

Farm to Market Road 2439 (FM 2439) is located in Comal and Hays counties. It begins at an intersection with FM 1102 in the unincorporated community of Hunter. The highway travels in a northeast direction along Hunter Road and enters San Marcos near several major retail centers, including a Tanger Outlet Center. FM 2439 ends at RM 12.

FM 2439 was designated on November 21, 1956, from RM 12 (later SH 80, now Moore Street) to FM 1102. On January 26, 2017, the section north of RM 12 was given to the city of San Marcos, as well as the section of SH 80 west of Loop 82.

== FM 2440 ==
Farm to Market Road 2440
- Location: Lee County
- Length: 6.8 mi (10.9 km)
- Existed: 1956–present

== FM 2441 ==
Farm to Market Road 2441
- Location: Goliad, Bee, and Refugio counties
- Length: 31.313 mi (50.393 km)
- Existed: 1956–present

== FM 2442 ==
Farm to Market Road 2442
- Location: Goliad County
- Length: 8.4 mi (13.5 km)
- Existed: 1956–present

== FM 2443 ==
Farm to Market Road 2443
- Location: Karnes County
- Length: 3.117 mi (5.016 km)
- Existed: 1956–present

== FM 2444 ==
Farm to Market Road 2444
- Location: Nueces County
- Length: 14.057 mi (22.623 km)
- Existed: 1956–present

== FM 2445 ==
Farm to Market Road 2445
- Location: Grimes County
- Length: 6.099 mi (9.815 km)
- Existed: 1956–present

== FM 2446 ==
Farm to Market Road 2446
- Location: Robertson County
- Length: 14.051 mi (22.613 km)
- Existed: 1956–present

== FM 2447 ==
Farm to Market Road 2447
- Location: Washington County
- Length: 8.197 mi (13.192 km)
- Existed: November 21, 1956–present

Farm to Market Road 2447 (FM 2447) is located in Washington County. It runs from US 290 west of Chappell Hill, east and northeast via Chappell Hill a distance of 8.4 miles.

FM 2447 was designated on November 21, 1956, on the current route as a replacement of a section of FM 1155.

== FM 2448 ==
Farm to Market Road 2448
- Location: Reeves County
- Length: 6.026 mi (9.698 km)
- Existed: January 29, 1959–present

Farm to Market Road 2448 (FM 2448) is located in southwestern Reeves County. It connects I-10 east of Balmorhea northward to SH 17 northeast of Saragosa.

FM 2448 begins at exit 212 along I-10 5.9 miles (9.5 km) east of Balmorhea. The two-lane road proceeds to the north across gentle terrain in a straight path for six miles (9.7 km) turning only to intersect SH 17 at its northern terminus northeast of Saragosa. The road has no junctions with any other state roads or highways between its endpoints, although Reeves County Road 306, which intersects FM 2448 about 1.6 miles (2.6 km) north of I-10, becomes FM 1215 one mile (1.6 km) to the west. The road provides a more direct connection between points northward on SH 17 with points eastward on I-10 than SH 17 through Saragosa that intersects I-10 two miles (3.2 km) to the west.

The current FM 2448 was designated on January 29, 1959.

=== FM 2448 (1956) ===
Farm to Market Road 2448
- Location: Collin County
- Existed: November 21, 1956–November 28, 1958

FM 2448 was designated on November 21, 1956, as a route in Collin County from the former route of FM 544 northward 5.6 miles (9.0 km) to Bethany. The road was extended north 2.1 miles (3.4 km) to SH 121 on September 27, 1957. That route was added as an extension to FM 2478 on November 28, 1958, and that portion of FM 2478 was removed from the state highway system and given to the city of Plano for maintenance on October 28, 1987.

== FM 2449 ==
Farm to Market Road 2449
- Location: Denton County
- Length: 11.585 mi (18.644 km)
- Existed: 1956–present

== FM 2450 ==
Farm to Market Road 2450
- Location: Denton County
- Length: 11.491 mi (18.493 km)
- Existed: 1956–present

== FM 2451 ==
Farm to Market Road 2451
- Location: Kaufman County
- Length: 6.292 mi (10.126 km)
- Existed: 1956–present

== FM 2452 ==
Farm to Market Road 2452
- Location: Navarro County
- Length: 5.243 mi (8.438 km)
- Existed: 1956–present

== FM 2453 ==
Farm to Market Road 2453
- Location: Rockwall County
- Length: 2.528 mi (4.068 km)
- Existed: 1956–present

== FM 2454 ==
Farm to Market Road 2454
- Location: Camp and Upshur counties
- Length: 7.715 mi (12.416 km)
- Existed: 1956–present

== FM 2455 ==
Farm to Market Road 2455
- Location: Upshur, Camp, and Wood counties
- Length: 7.217 mi (11.615 km)
- Existed: 1956–present

== FM 2456 ==
Farm to Market Road 2456
- Location: Fannin County
- Length: 4.66 mi (7.50 km)
- Existed: 1958–present

=== FM 2456 (1956) ===
Farm to Market Road 2456
- Location: Harrison and Marion Counties
- Existed: November 21, 1956–by February 15, 1957

The original FM 2456 was designated on November 1, 1956, to run from the southwest end of Ferrells Bridge Dam westward to FM 450. This was cancelled and redesignated as part of FM 726 by February 15, 1957.

=== FM 2456 (1957) ===
Farm to Market Road 2456
- Location: Palo Pinto County
- Existed: October 31, 1957–January 1958

The second FM 2456 was designated on October 31, 1957, to run from US 281 north of Mineral Wells east and south to US 180 east of Mineral Wells. This route was cancelled 90 days later. The route would be restored as FM 1821 in 1960.

== FM 2457 ==
Farm to Market Road 2457
- Location: Polk County
- Length: 4.766 mi (7.670 km)
- Existed: March 31, 1970–present

Farm to Market Road 2457 (FM 2457) is located in Polk County. It runs from Lake Livingston east to US 190.

FM 2457 was designated on March 31, 1970, on the current route as a replacement of a section of US 190.

=== FM 2457 (1956) ===
Farm to Market Road 2457
- Location: Harrison County
- Existed: November 21, 1956–August 5, 1968

A previous route numbered FM 2457 was designated on November 21, 1956, from FM 1999, 1.3 miles (2.1 km) east of Leigh, north 5.2 miles (8.4 km) to Caddo Lake. FM 2457 was cancelled on August 5, 1968, and became a portion of FM 9.

== FM 2458 ==
Farm to Market Road 2458
- Location: Garza County
- Length: 5.9 mi (9.5 km)
- Existed: May 2, 1962–present

Farm to Market Road 2458 (FM 2458) is located in Garza County.

FM 2458 begins at an intersection with US 84 in Justiceburg. The highway travels in an eastern direction just north of Lake Alan Henry, turning to the north at an intersection with FM 3519. FM 2458 runs in a northern direction near the Lake Alan Henry Lodges. State maintenance for the highway ends at County Road 345.

The current FM 2458 was designated on May 2, 1962, traveling from US 84 at Justiceburg eastward at a distance of 2.7 miles (4.3 km). The highway was extended 3.1 miles (5.0 km) eastward and northward on June 28, 1963.

=== FM 2458 (1956) ===
Farm to Market Road 2458
- Location: Hardin County
- Existed: November 21, 1956–December 1, 1958

The first route numbered FM 2458 was designated on November 21, 1956, traveling from FM 1003 near Honey Island, northwestward at a distance of 5.0 miles (8.0 km). The highway was extended 3.8 miles (6.1 km) northwestward on October 31, 1957. This FM 2458 was cancelled on December 1, 1958, with the mileage being transferred to FM 943.

=== FM 2458 (1959) ===
Farm to Market Road 2458
- Location: Rains County
- Existed: November 24, 1959–October 18, 1961

The second route numbered FM 2458 was designated on November 24, 1959, running from US 69 near Emory southward and eastward to Colony Church at a distance of 8.1 miles (13.0 km). The highway was cancelled on October 18, 1961, with the mileage being transferred to FM 779.

== FM 2459 ==
Farm to Market Road 2459
- Location: Throckmorton County
- Length: 4.651 mi (7.485 km)
- Existed: October 31, 1958–present

=== FM 2459 (1956) ===
Farm to Market Road 2459
- Location: Liberty County
- Existed: November 21, 1956–October 31, 1957

A previous route numbered FM 2459 was designated on November 21, 1956, from FM 834, 2.8 miles (4.5 km) northwest of Hull, north 6.8 miles (10.9 km) to FM 162 (now SH 105). FM 2459 was cancelled eleven months later and removed from the highway system as the county could not acquire the right of way; FM 1410 was extended instead.

== FM 2460 ==
Farm to Market Road 2460
- Location: Newton County
- Length: 6.171 mi (9.931 km)
- Existed: 1956–present

== FM 2461 ==
Farm to Market Road 2461
- Location: Eastland County
- Length: 8.811 mi (14.180 km)
- Existed: November 21, 1956–present

== FM 2462 ==
Farm to Market Road 2462
- Location: Carson County
- Length: 3.272 mi (5.266 km)
- Existed: May 6, 1964–present

=== RM 2462 (1956) ===
Ranch to Market Road 2462
- Location: Brewster County
- Existed: November 21, 1956–February 19, 1960

A previous route numbered Ranch to Market Road 2462 (RM 2462) was designated on November 21, 1956, from SH 118 near Study Butte west 5.0 miles (8.0 km) to a road intersection near Terlingua. On October 31, 1957, the road was extended west 14.0 miles (22.5 km) to the Presidio County line. RM 2462 was cancelled on February 19, 1960, and transferred to FM 170.

=== FM 2462 (1960) ===
Farm to Market Road 2462
- Location: Polk County
- Existed: September 27, 1960–September 16, 1963

The second route numbered FM 2462 was designated on September 27, 1960, from SH 146 in Schwab City to a point 1.5 miles (2.4 km) southwest. FM 2462 was cancelled on September 16, 1963, and transferred to FM 2665.

== RM 2463 ==
Ranch to Market Road 2463
- Location: Upton County
- Length: 12.301 mi (19.797 km)
- Existed: November 26, 1969–present

=== RM 2463 (1956) ===
Ranch to Market Road 2463
- Location: Culberson County
- Existed: November 21, 1956–February 1957

The original RM 2463 was designated on November 1, 1956, to run from US 80 at Kent north 5.0 miles (8.0 km). This was cancelled 90 days later.

=== FM 2463 (1957) ===
Farm to Market Road 2463
- Location: Erath County
- Existed: October 31, 1957–October 3, 1961

The first use of the FM 2463 designation was in Erath County, from SH 108 northwest of Huckabay northeast 3.7 miles (6.0 km) to Liberty Church. FM 2463 was cancelled on October 3, 1961, and transferred to FM 1715 (now FM 1188).

=== FM 2463 (1962) ===
Farm to Market Road 2463
- Location: Floyd County
- Existed: May 2, 1962–September 19, 1968

The second use of the FM 2463 designation was in Floyd County, from FM 378, 3 miles (4.8 km) south of FM 788, east 7.1 miles (11.4 km) to FM 207. FM 2463 was cancelled on September 16, 1968, and became a portion of FM 2286.

== FM 2464 ==
Farm to Market Road 2464
- Location: Briscoe County
- Length: 3.76 mi (6.05 km)
- Existed: 1956–present

== FM 2465 ==
Farm to Market Road 2465
- Location: Childress County
- Length: 3.712 mi (5.974 km)
- Existed: 1956–present

== FM 2466 ==
Farm to Market Road 2466
- Location: Childress County
- Length: 2.304 mi (3.708 km)
- Existed: 1956–present

== FM 2467 ==
Farm to Market Road 2467
- Location: Collingsworth County
- Length: 2.005 mi (3.227 km)
- Existed: 1956–present

== FM 2468 ==
Farm to Market Road 2468
- Location: Shelby County
- Length: 2.216 mi (3.566 km)
- Existed: September 27, 1960–present

Farm to Market Road 2468 (FM 2468) is located in Shelby County. It runs from FM 699 in Center northwest 2.2 miles (3.5 km) before state maintenance ends.

FM 2468 was designated on September 27, 1960, along the current route.

=== FM 2468 (1956) ===
Farm to Market Road 2468
- Location: Collingsworth County
- Existed: November 21, 1956–October 31, 1957

The first use of the FM 2468 designation was in Collingsworth County, from FM 338, 4.5 miles (7.2 km) southeast of Wellington, south 1.0 mile (1.6 km) to Fresno. FM 2468 was cancelled eleven months later and removed from the state highway system in exchange for the creation of FM 2531.

=== FM 2468 (1958) ===
Farm to Market Road 2468
- Location: Carson County
- Existed: October 31, 1958–December 11, 1959

The next use of the FM 2468 designation was in Carson County, from FM 294 at White Deer west 3.9 miles (6.3 km) to a road intersection. FM 2468 was cancelled on December 31, 1959, and transferred to FM 2385.

== RM 2469 ==
Ranch to Market Road 2469
- Location: Irion County
- Length: 22.136 mi (35.624 km)
- Existed: October 31, 1958–present

Ranch to Market Road 2469 (RM 2469) is located in Irion County. It is 22.1 miles (35.6 km) in length.

RM 2469 begins at an intersection with SH 163 approximately 12 miles (19 km) north of Barnhart. The route travels to the east through unincorporated Irion County; the only intersections are with county roads. RM 2469 provides access to Ketchum Mountain and the Ketchum Oil Field. The highway then curves to the southeast and crosses Lopez Creek, whose source lies just south of the roadway. It then enters the county seat of Mertzon along Oak Avenue, reaching its eastern terminus at US 67.

The current RM 2469 was established on October 31, 1958. Its eastern terminus has always been at US 67 in Mertzon. The original western terminus was 5.0 miles (8.0 km) from that point. The route was lengthened to 11.0 miles (17.7 km) on September 27, 1960, and 17.0 miles (27.4 km) on May 2, 1962. The extension to SH 163 occurred on June 28, 1963.

=== FM 2469 (1956) ===
Farm to Market Road 2469
- Location: Cottle County
- Existed: November 21, 1956–October 31, 1957

Farm to Market Road 2469 (FM 2469) was designated on November 21, 1956, and connected north and east 4.5 miles (7.2 km) from US 70 near Ogden in Cottle County. That designation was removed on October 31, 1957, in exchange for the creation of FM 2532.

== FM 2470 ==
Farm to Market Road 2470
- Location: Dickens County
- Length: 2.987 mi (4.807 km)
- Existed: 1956–present

== FM 2471 ==
Farm to Market Road 2471
- Location: Donley County
- Length: 11.024 mi (17.741 km)
- Existed: 1956–present

== FM 2472 ==
Farm to Market Road 2472
- Location: Hall County
- Length: 5.909 mi (9.510 km)
- Existed: December 14, 1959–present

=== FM 2472 (1956) ===
Farm to Market Road 2472
- Location: Hall County
- Existed: November 21, 1956–December 14, 1959

A previous route numbered FM 2472 was designated on November 21, 1956, from FM 657, 5.3 miles (8.5 km) west of Plaska, to a point 3.5 miles (5.6 km) south. On October 1, 1957, the road was extended south 6.5 miles (10.5 km) to SH 86. FM 2472 was cancelled on December 14, 1959, and transferred to FM 657; FM 2472 was reassigned to the old route of FM 657.

== FM 2473 ==
Farm to Market Road 2473
- Location: Gray and Wheeler counties
- Length: 26.362 mi (42.426 km)
- Existed: 1956–present

== FM 2474 ==
Farm to Market Road 2474
- Location: Wheeler County
- Length: 1.005 mi (1.617 km)
- Existed: 1956–present

== FM 2475 ==
Farm to Market Road 2475
- Location: Van Zandt and Hunt counties
- Length: 4.376 mi (7.042 km)
- Existed: January 26, 1969–present

=== FM 2475 (1956) ===
Farm to Market Road 2475
- Location: Wise County
- Existed: November 21, 1956–September 27, 1957

A previous route numbered FM 2475 was designated on November 21, 1956, from SH 114 north of Bridgeport southwest 6.0 miles (9.7 km) to Lake Bridgeport. FM 2475 was extended west to FM 1156 on September 27, 1957, and was redesignated as RM 2475.

=== RM 2475 ===
Ranch to Market Road 2475
- Location: Wise County and Jack counties
- Existed: September 27, 1957–October 1, 1968

Ranch to Market Road 2475 (RM 2475) was designated on September 27, 1957, from SH 114 north of Bridgeport southwest and west 17.0 miles (27.4 km) to FM 1156 west of Wizard Wells as an extension and redesignation of FM 2475. On June 4, 1964, a 4.4-mile (7.1 km) section from FM 1156 at Vineyard to FM 1156 was transferred to SH 824. The remainder of RM 2475 (as well as SH 824) was cancelled on October 1, 1968, and transferred to SH 24 (now US 380).

== FM 2476 ==
Farm to Market Road 2476
- Location: Nacogdoches County
- Length: 1.364 mi (2.195 km)
- Existed: September 27, 1960–present

=== FM 2476 (1956) ===
Farm to Market Road 2476
- Location: Hopkins and Wood counties
- Existed: November 21, 1956–December 21, 1959

A previous route numbered FM 2476 was designated on November 21, 1956, from FM 270 (now FM 69) near Blackoak south 3.4 miles (5.5 km) to FM 1483 (now FM 69) at Coke. FM 2476 was cancelled on December 21, 1959, and transferred to FM 69.

== FM 2477 ==
Farm to Market Road 2477
- Location: Gray County
- Length: 10.832 mi (17.432 km)
- Existed: September 20, 1961–present

=== FM 2477 (1956) ===
Farm to Market Road 2477
- Location: Tarrant County
- Existed: November 21, 1956–March 4, 1957

The first use of the FM 2477 designation was in Tarrant County, from US 287 near Mansfield south 1.0 mile (1.6 km) to the Johnson County line. FM 2447 was cancelled four months later and transferred to FM 917.

=== FM 2477 (1957) ===
Farm to Market Road 2477
- Location: Hood and Parker counties
- Existed: October 31, 1957–December 15, 1959

The next use of the FM 2477 designation was in Hood and Parker counties, from FM 4, 4 miles (6.4 km) east of Lipan, northeast and north 9.7 miles (15.6 km) to a road intersection 1 mile (1.6 km) south of Dennis. FM 2477 was cancelled on December 15, 1959, and transferred to FM 1543.

== FM 2478 ==
Farm to Market Road 2478
- Location: Collin County
- Length: 15.419 mi (24.814 km)
- Existed: 1956–present

Farm to Market Road 2478 (FM 2478) is located in Collin County. It serves the cities of Frisco, McKinney, Prosper, Celina, and Weston.

FM 2478 was created in 1956 from SH 24 (now US 380 (University Dr)) to FM 1461 (Frontier Pkwy/Laud Howell Pkwy) for a length of 3.3 miles (5.3 km). On November 28, 1958, FM 2478 was extended for 17.0 miles (27.4 km) from SH 24 (US 380) to SH 121 and ending at FM 544 (currently 15th Street, no longer FM 544). FM 2448 was combined and canceled, adding 7.7 miles (12.4 km). On June 1, 1956, FM 2478 was extended from FM 1461 to FM 455 northward for 6.4 miles (10.3 km). On October 27, 1987, FM 2478 (from SH 121 to FM 544 (15th Street)) for 7.4 miles (11.9 km) was canceled and given back to the City of Plano for maintenance. The current FM 2478 northern terminus is at FM 455, and its southern terminus is at SH 121/Sam Rayburn Tollway. FM 2478 is currently known as Custer Rd and is a major road and serves as a border for many cities on most of its route (Frisco/McKinney, McKinney/Prosper, McKinney/Celina, and Celina/Weston.)

Junction list

The entire route is in Collin County.

Location	mi	km	Destinations	Notes
Allen–Frisco– McKinney–Plano quadripoint	0.0	0.0	Sam Rayburn Tollway (SH 121)	Southern terminus
Frisco–McKinney line	0.8	1.3	Rolater Road/Collin McKinney Parkway	
Frisco–McKinney line	1.8	2.9	FM 3537 west (Main Street) / Stacy Road	formerly FM 720
Frisco–McKinney line	3.0	4.8	Stonebridge Drive	
Frisco–McKinney line	3.4	5.5	Eldorado Pkwy	
Frisco–McKinney line	4.4	7.1	Westridge Boulevard	West side only
McKinney	5.4	8.7	Virginia Parkway	
McKinney–Prosper line	6.4	10.3	US 380 / University Drive	
McKinney–Prosper line	7.7	12.4	First Street/Wilmeth Road	
McKinney–Prosper line	8.4	13.5	Prosper Trail/Bloomdale Road	
Prosper–Celina– McKinney tripoint	9.5	15.3	FM 1461 (Frontier Parkway/Laud Howell Parkway)	
McKinney–Celina line	10.5	16.9	Ownsby Parkway	West side only
McKinney–Celina line	11.5	18.5	Choate Parkway/Twin Bridges Road	West side County Road 125
McKinney–Celina line	12.0	19.3	Collin County Outer Loop	West side only
Celina–Weston line	15.4	24.8	FM 455	Northern terminus
1.000 mi = 1.609 km; 1.000 km = 0.621 mi

== FM 2479 ==
Farm to Market Road 2479
- Location: Lamb County
- Length: 6.355 mi (10.227 km)
- Existed: May 2, 1962–present

=== RM 2479 (1956) ===
Ranch to Market Road 2479
- Location: Schleicher County
- Existed: November 21, 1956–May 22, 1958

The first use of the RM 2479 designation was in Schleicher County, from SH 29, 7 miles (11 km) east of Eldorado, to a point 7.3 miles (11.7 km) southeast. On February 28, 1957, the northern terminus was moved 2.5 miles (4.0 km) west. RM 2479 was cancelled on May 22, 1958, as the county was unable to secure right of way for the route.

=== RM 2479 (1958) ===
Ranch to Market Road 2479
- Location: Schleicher County
- Existed: October 31, 1958–October 9, 1961

The second use of the RM 2479 was also in Schleicher County, from SH 29, 17 miles (27 km) east of Eldorado, to a point 7.0 miles (11.3 km) north. RM 2479 was cancelled on October 9, 1961, and transferred to RM 2084.

== FM 2480 ==
Farm to Market Road 2480
- Location: Cameron County
- Length: 6.814 mi (10.966 km)
- Existed: 1957–present

Farm to Market Road 2480 (FM 2480) is located in Cameron County.

The southern terminus of FM 2480 is in Los Fresnos at FM 1847, which provides access from the northern suburbs of Cameron County to Brownsville's central business district. The route travels northeast along Old Port Road before turning to the north along San Roman Road. The FM 2480 designation ends at FM 510 in Bayview.

FM 2480 was designated on December 13, 1956, from FM 1847 northeastward approximately 5.5 miles (8.9 km). The northern extension to FM 510 was added on October 31, 1957.

== FM 2481 ==
Farm to Market Road 2481
- Location: Erath County
- Length: 23.528 mi (37.865 km)
- Existed: November 24, 1959–present

=== FM 2481 (1956) ===
Farm to Market Road 2481
- Location: Jones County
- Existed: October 31, 1957–November 5, 1958

A previous route numbered FM 2481 was designated on October 31, 1957, from SH 92 at Hamlin north 4.7 miles (7.6 km) to the Stonewall County line. FM 2481 was cancelled on November 5, 1958, and transferred to FM 1835.

== FM 2482 ==
Farm to Market Road 2482
- Location: Shackelford County
- Length: 5.203 mi (8.373 km)
- Existed: 1957–present

== FM 2483 ==
Farm to Market Road 2483
- Location: Bell County
- Length: 1.784 mi (2.871 km)
- Existed: 1957–present

== FM 2484 ==
Farm to Market Road 2484
- Location: Bell County
- Length: 18.928 mi (30.462 km)
- Existed: 1957–present

== FM 2485 ==
Farm to Market Road 2485
- Location: Leon County
- Length: 6.111 mi (9.835 km)
- Existed: January 31, 1961–present

=== FM 2485 (1956) ===
Farm to Market Road 2485
- Location: Falls County
- Existed: October 31, 1957–October 14, 1960

A previous route numbered FM 2485 was designated on October 31, 1957, from SH 320, 5 miles (8.0 km) northeast of Lott, southeast 3.6 miles (5.8 km) to a road intersection. FM 2485 was cancelled on October 14, 1960, and transferred to FM 2027.

== FM 2486 ==
Farm to Market Road 2486
- Location: Hamilton and Comanche counties
- Length: 17.112 mi (27.539 km)
- Existed: 1957–present

== FM 2487 ==
Farm to Market Road 2487
- Location: Bailey County
- Length: 7.385 mi (11.885 km)
- Existed: May 2, 1962–present

=== FM 2487 (1956) ===
Farm to Market Road 2487
- Location: Hill County
- Existed: October 31, 1957–October 9, 1961

A previous route numbered FM 2487 was designated on October 31, 1957, from FM 1244 (now FM 933), 1.5 miles (2.4 km) south of Aquilla, southwest 3.3 miles (5.3 km) to FM 2411 (now FM 2114). FM 2487 was cancelled on October 9, 1961, and transferred to FM 1304.

== FM 2488 ==
Farm to Market Road 2488
- Location: Hill County
- Length: 4.312 mi (6.939 km)
- Existed: 1957–present

== FM 2489 ==
Farm to Market Road 2489
- Location: Limestone County
- Length: 12.464 mi (20.059 km)
- Existed: 1957–present

== FM 2490 ==
Farm to Market Road 2490
- Location: McLennan County
- Length: 16.126 mi (25.952 km)
- Existed: 1957–present

== FM 2491 ==
Farm to Market Road 2491
- Location: McLennan County
- Length: 5.604 mi (9.019 km)
- Existed: 1957–present

Farm to Market Road 2491 (FM 2491) is located in McLennan County. It is 5.6 miles (9.0 km) long. The road begins at Loop 340, which loops in Waco. The road then goes northeast, splits into FM 2957 which eventually leads to FM 2491 ending at Double Ee Ranch Road. The road continues on to FM 939 between McLennan and Limestone counties.

FM 2491 was designated on October 31, 1957, from SH 6 east to a road intersection. On May 22, 1959, the road was revised to begin at Loop 232 (now Loop 340).

== FM 2492 ==
Farm to Market Road 2492
- Location: Brown County
- Length: 4.697 mi (7.559 km)
- Existed: November 24, 1959–present

=== FM 2492 (1957) ===
Farm to Market Road 2492
- Location: Anderson County
- Existed: October 31, 1957–November 28, 1958

A previous route numbered FM 2492 was designated on October 31, 1957, from SH 294 at Slocum southeast 5.6 miles (9.0 km) to the Houston County line. FM 2492 was cancelled 11 months later and transferred to FM 2022.

== FM 2493 ==
Farm to Market Road 2493
- Location: Cherokee and Smith counties
- Length: 21.17 mi (Note: The certified length given is shorter than the actual mileage, as the TxDOT description of FM 2493 considers it to be discontinuous at rather than concurrent with US 69.) (34.07 km)
- Existed: October 31, 1957–present

Farm to Market Road 2493 (FM 2493) is located in far north-central Cherokee County and south-central Smith County. It is approximately 21 miles (34 km) in length, running from an intersection with FM 177 west of Mixon northwestward, then north through Bullard, Flint, Gresham, then into Tyler where it intersects US 69. It is known locally as Houston Street in Bullard and Old Jacksonville Highway in Tyler.

FM 2493 was designated on October 31, 1957, from the US 69 intersection south of Bullard, north for 16.1 miles (25.9 km). On May 2, 1962, it was extended by 5.3 miles (8.5 km), to FM 177 west of Mixon. On June 27, 1995, the section of the road from Gresham to Tyler was designated Urban Road 2493 (UR 2493). The designation reverted to FM 2493 with the elimination of the Urban Road system on November 15, 2018.

Junction list

County	Location	mi	km	Destinations	Notes
Cherokee		0.0	0.0	FM 177 – Mixon, Mount Selman	
Cherokee		5.1	8.2	US 69 south – Jacksonville	South end of US 69 overlap
Cherokee		5.3	8.5	US 69 north – Tyler	North end of US 69 overlap
Smith	Bullard	7.0	11.3	FM 344 – Teaselville, Troup	
Smith	Flint	11.9	19.2	FM 346 – Teaselville, Whitehouse	
Smith	Gresham	14.0	22.5	FM 2813 east / County Road 168	
Smith		14.7	23.7	Loop 49 Toll	
Smith	Tyler	17.5	28.2	SH 57 west (Grande Boulevard)	
Smith	Tyler	19.2	30.9	Loop 323 (WSW Loop 323)	
Smith	Tyler	21.4	34.4	US 69 (S. Broadway Avenue)	
1.000 mi = 1.609 km; 1.000 km = 0.621 mi: Concurrency terminus

== FM 2494 ==
Farm to Market Road 2494
- Location: Henderson County
- Length: 7.092 mi (11.413 km)
- Existed: 1957–present

== FM 2495 ==
Farm to Market Road 2495
- Location: Henderson County
- Length: 5.309 mi (8.544 km)
- Existed: 1957–present

Farm to Market Road 2495 (FM 2495) is located in Henderson County.

FM 2495 begins at an intersection with SH 31 and runs in an eastern direction along Flat Creek Road. The highway has an interchange with US 175 / Loop 7 and turns north at Lake Athens. FM 2495 leaves the Athens city limits north of the lake and ends at an intersection with FM 317.

FM 2495 was designated on October 31, 1957, running from SH 31 eastward at a distance of 1.8 miles (2.9 km). The highway was extended 3.5 miles (5.6 km) to FM 317 on June 1, 1965.

Junction list

The entire route is in Henderson County.

Location	mi	km	Destinations	Notes
Athens	0.0	0.0	Bus. SH 31 – Tyler, Downtown Athens	
Athens	1.5	2.4	Loop 7 (US 175 / SH 19) – Tyler, Jacksonville	Interchange
Athens	3.3	5.3	FM 2892 south	
	5.3	8.5	FM 317 – Leagueville	
1.000 mi = 1.609 km; 1.000 km = 0.621 mi

== FM 2496 ==
Farm to Market Road 2496
- Location: Rusk County
- Length: 6.905 mi (11.113 km)
- Existed: October 31, 1957–present

Farm to Market Road 2496 (FM 2496) is located in Rusk County. It connects FM 1798 east of Laneville with US 259 north of Mount Enterprise.

FM 2496 was designated on October 31, 1957, along the current route. The original eastern terminus, formerly SH 26, became US 259 on December 12, 1962.

== FM 2497 ==
Farm to Market Road 2497
- Location: Angelina County
- Length: 8.619 mi (13.871 km)
- Existed: 1957–present

== FM 2498 ==
Farm to Market Road 2498
- Location: Houston County
- Length: 3.53 mi (5.68 km)
- Existed: 1957–present

== FM 2499 ==
Farm to Market Road 2499
- Location: Grapevine–Corinth
- Length: 13.578 mi (21.852 km)
- Existed: August 27, 1960–present

Farm to Market Road 2499 (FM 2499) runs from SH 121/SH 26 in Grapevine, near the north entrance of DFW Airport, to I-35E in Denton.

FM 2499 begins at an interchange with SH 121/SH 26 near Grapevine Mills, just north of DFW Airport. The highway runs about a mile east of Lake Grapevine, before entering the city of Flower Mound. FM 2499 runs through Flower Mound as Long Prairie Road south of FM 407, before becoming Village Parkway. The highway runs through Highland Village, passing FM 2181 in Corinth, where the highway becomes Barrel Strap Road. The highway then intersects State School Road and becomes State School Road, and ends at I-35E.

The current FM 2499 was designated on September 27, 1960, running from FM 1171 south to the Denton–Tarrant county line. The highway was extended further south to SH 121 on November 29, 1982. This extension of FM 2499 ran across the Grapevine Lake dam and through the lake's spillway. FM 2499 was extended north to FM 407 on October 26, 1983. On April 27, 1988, the extension to SH 121 was redescribed as going from north of the county line to SH 121. Due to urban growth and the inability to widen the road across the dam (plus the need, during flood incidents, to close the road across the spillway), the road was rerouted to the east in its current configuration on April 27, 1988. Also, the old route of FM 2499 south of the Denton–Tarrant county line was cancelled, and this portion was permanently closed, as it was inundated by Lake Grapevine. However, the old route of FM 2499 north of the Denton–Tarrant county line was still part of FM 2499, creating a split in FM 2499. On May 29, 1991, an extension north to Loop 288 was designated. On April 28, 1994, the old route of FM 2499 to the Denton–Tarrant county line was cancelled, eliminating the split in FM 2499. The extension to FM 2181 opened in 2010 along Village Parkway through Highland Village, ending at FM 2181 in Corinth. The extension to Robinson Road opened on December 18, 2017. An extension to I-35E opened on March 12, 2018. A new traffic light at Robinson Road was added by June 2018. Landscaping on the new section is under construction. The extension to I-35E was finally designated on December 10, 2020. The eventual plan is to reroute Loop 288 south on new construction, along part of FM 2499 to just south of Robinson Road, and then southwest along new construction (right-of-way has already been acquired for this section) to FM 2181. Existing Loop 288 southwest to I-35E will be redesignated as Spur 288. FM 2499 will be truncated to end at Loop 288.

The entire highway was redesignated Urban Road 2499 (UR 2499) on June 27, 1995. The designation reverted to FM 2499 with the elimination of the Urban Road system on November 15, 2018.

Junction list

County	Location	mi	km	Destinations	Notes
Tarrant	Grapevine	0.0	0.0	SH 121 south / SH 114 / I-635 east – Fort Worth, Dallas, DFW Airport	Interchange; southbound exit and northbound entrance
Tarrant	Grapevine	0.1	0.16	To SH 121 north / SH 26 south / via Stars and Stripes Way, Grapevine Mills Boulevard	Interchange
Denton	Flower Mound	4.6	7.4	FM 3040 (Flower Mound Road)	
Denton	Flower Mound	6.1	9.8	FM 1171 (Cross Timbers Road)	
Denton	Flower Mound	8.8	14.2	FM 407 (Justin Road)	
Denton	Corinth	13.6	21.9	FM 2181 (Teasley Lane)	
Denton	Denton	16.6	26.7	I-35E / Mayhill Road	I-35E exit 462; continues north as Mayhill Road; access to Medical City Denton
1.000 mi = 1.609 km; 1.000 km = 0.621 mi: Incomplete access

=== FM 2499 (1957) ===
Farm to Market Road 2499
- Location: Houston County
- Existed: October 31, 1957–December 18, 1959

FM 2499 was first designated on October 31, 1957, running from SH 7 near Kennard northward to a point at a distance of 3.8 miles (6.1 km). On December 18, 1959, the highway was cancelled and transferred to FM 1733.
