= Eddie Arning =

American outsider artist (1898–1993)

- Born: 1898; Germania, Texas
- Died: 1993 (aged 94–95)
- Movement: Modern Art

Eddie Arning (1898–1993) was an American outsider artist. He was born in the farming community of Germania, Texas. Arning created the vast majority of his work while being institutionalized for schizophrenia.

== Biography ==
Arning was born to a German homesteading family, that had settled in the Germania region of Texas, 15 years prior. As a young adult, he was institutionalized for schizophrenia, spending one year in hospital prior to returning home, only to be re-institutionalized in 1934 for violent acts. In 1964, after 30 years in the institution, he was introduced to crayons by Helen Mayfield, an Austin artist who worked in the hospital that summer, and began coloring.

== Work ==
After a few years of using crayons, Arning switched to oil pastels and began producing more complex compositions. His early works were autobiographical and depict scenes from his childhood with animals, flowers, windmills and churches. Later, Arning became inspired by newspapers, advertisements and magazine illustrations and was producing more graphic images.

Over ten years (between 1964 and 1974), Arning produced over 2000 drawings. His work has been likened to styles in avant-garde twentieth-century art. Arning's work was brought to public attention during the 1960s by a University of Texas Professor who sold the works to help pay for Arning's expenses. Arning had his first public exhibition in 1965 while being institutionalized.

In 1974, Arning was expulsed from the institution for his conduct, going to live with his sister where he ceased creating work.

Arning died in 1993.

== Collections ==
Arning is represented in numerous museums, including the Minneapolis Institute of Art, Museum of Fine Arts, Boston, Smithsonian American Art Museum, Washington, D.C. American Folk Art Museum, New York, Pérez Art Museum Miami, and the Art Museum of Southeast Texas, Beaumont, Texas.
