= List of killings by law enforcement officers in the United States, December 2023 =

This is a list of people reported killed by non-military law enforcement officers in the United States in December 2023, whether in the line of duty or not, and regardless of reason or method. The listing documents the occurrence of a death, making no implications regarding wrongdoing or justification on the part of the person killed or officer involved. Killings are arranged by date of the incident that caused death. Different death dates, if known, are noted in the description. The table below lists 119 people.

== December 2023 ==
| Date | Name (age) of deceased | Race | Location | Description |
|---|---|---|---|---|
| 2023-12-31 | Talmadge Rodney Bryant (73) | Unknown | Cottondale, Florida | Jackson County Sheriff's Office deputies shot and killed Bryant as they responded to a shots fired report. Officers alleged that Bryant fired at police before being shot. |
| 2023-12-31 | Steven Clark Jr. (41) | White | Ocala, Florida | Clark Jr. reportedly fired his gun in the air and pointed it at Marion County deputies before being shot. |
| 2023-12-31 | Benjamin McDaniel (30) | White | Little Rock, Arkansas | An off-duty officer working security at a Walmart attempted to detain McDaniel, suspected of shoplifting. The officer shot and killed McDaniel after he allegedly moved towards the officer with a knife while ignoring commands to drop it. |
| 2023-12-31 | Javier Flores (39) | Hispanic | North Las Vegas, NV | |
| 2023-12-30 | Ornela Morgan (43) | White | New City, New York | A Bronxville Police sergeant shot his wife and their two sons at their home before killing himself. |
| 2023-12-30 | Liam Morgan (10) | White | New City, New York | A Bronxville Police sergeant shot his wife and their two sons at their home before killing himself. |
| 2023-12-30 | Gabriel Morgan (12) | White | New City, New York | A Bronxville Police sergeant shot his wife and their two sons at their home before killing himself. |
| 2023-12-29 | Paul Coderre (55) | White | Fairhaven, Massachusetts | Police were called to a bar where Coderre, the former acting fire chief for neighboring New Bedford, had gotten into an altercation. Police stated Coderre shot at officers when they arrived, striking one in the leg, before being shot. Coderre had previously been fired from New Bedford's fire department for lying while collecting disability benefits. |
| 2023-12-29 | Connor Jeffrey Amador (20) | White | Lompoc, California | A Lompoc Police officer shot and killed a male at a Circle K. Before being shot, the male robbed people in and around the gas station. |
| 2023-12-29 | Bashe McDaniel (52) | Unknown | New York City, New York | A woman approached MTA Police and told them a man had groped her, showing them a photo of a man with a distinctive jacket. Officers found the man, McDaniel, a block away and attempted to question him. Officers shot and killed McDaniel after he allegedly fired a shot at them with a semiautomatic weapon. |
| 2023-12-29 | Travis Darrell Shoulders (34) | Black | Jackson, MS | |
| 2023-12-29 | Mary Antonette Garcia (44) | Hispanic | Española, New Mexico | |
| 2023-12-28 | Kevin Harlfinger (40) | White | Woodbridge, New Jersey | Cranford police were pursuing a stolen vehicle when it crashed at the southbound lanes of Garden State Parkway. A shootout ensued that left an unidentified man dead and a Cranford police officer injured. |
| 2023-12-28 | Iesel Torres-Santiago (33) | Hispanic | Las Vegas, Nevada | |
| 2023-12-28 | Shane Kelec (38) | Unknown | Elizabethtown, Pennsylvania | |
| 2023-12-28 | Timothy McArdle Jr. (30) | Black | Fairbanks, Alaska | |
| 2023-12-28 | Kevin J. Harlfinger (40) | White | Woodbridge, New Jersey | |
| 2023-12-28 | Thomas Matias (77) | White | Honolulu, Hawaii | |
| 2023-12-27 | Robert Brown (28) | Unknown | San Bernardino, California | |
| 2023-12-27 | unidentified person | Unknown | Weston, Wisconsin | |
| 2023-12-27 | Tyrone Lee Johnson II (33) | Black | Portland, Oregon | |
| 2023-12-27 | Walter Lester McDonald III (81) | Unknown | Greenville, South Carolina | |
| 2023-12-27 | Justin Jeffrey Davidson | White | Enterprise, Nevada | |
| 2023-12-27 | Paton John Pinette (27) | White | Jacksonville, Florida | |
| 2023-12-26 | Kalob Douglas Watts (21) | Asian | Bismarck, Missouri | A neighbor called police after a disturbance at Watts's home. The first officer who arrived spoke to Watts and attempted to get him to drop the handgun he was holding. The second officer arrived and shot and killed Watts within thirty seconds of arriving. |
| 2023-12-26 | Jerome Avalos Jr. (23) | Hispanic | Pueblo, Colorado | |
| 2023-12-26 | Justin Whipps (30) | Black | Lauderdale County, Mississippi | Whipps, an on-duty prison guard at East Mississippi Correctional Facility, was shot and killed by another guard during a dispute in the prison's parking lot. |
| 2023-12-26 | Konrad Farad Khorshahian (63) | White | Austin, Texas | Police responded after a call was made reporting a man with a rifle at a parking lot, which was later determined to have been placed by Khorshahian himself. A brief standoff occurred, in which one officer expressed confusion over whether Khorshahian was carrying a real weapon or a pellet gun. An officer shot and killed Khorshahian, who was found to be holding a BB rifle. |
| 2023-12-26 | Winston Dunham (33) | Black | North Charleston, South Carolina | |
| 2023-12-26 | Cameron Lee Tolber (30) | White | Pisgah, Alabama | |
| 2023-12-26 | unidentified male (37) | Black | Garden City, Michigan | |
| 2023-12-25 | Nicholas Detweiler | White | Mount Shasta, California | A Mount Shasta police officer fatally shot Detweiler and wounded an Amtrak employee on a train stopped in Mount Shasta en route to Sacramento. Few details were immediately released. The California Department of Justice (DOJ) stated in a press release that they would investigate the shooting under Assembly Bill 1506, which requires the DOJ to investigate any fatal police shooting in which the subject was unarmed. |
| 2023-12-25 | Jorge Abram Carrillo (28) | Hispanic | Brownsville, Texas | The unidentified male allegedly tried to strike a police officer with a vehicle. An unidentified officer then fatally shot the male. |
| 2023-12-24 | James L. Fischer (58) | White | Joplin, Missouri | Police responded to a report of a suicidal man armed with a gun. Police shot and killed the man on his front lawn. |
| 2023-12-24 | Todd Novick (46) | Unknown | Rochester, New York | Police responded to reports of two men walking down the street, one of whom was reported to have a gun. Officers spoke to three people on the scene, and one of them, Novick, began to run away. Officers pursued Novick and shot him in front of an abandoned home after he pulled out a replica firearm. |
| 2023-12-24 | Patrick Kirby | White | Rockford, Illinois | |
| 2023-12-24 | Johnny Lee Wodd (54) | White | Roseland, Indiana | |
| 2023-12-24 | John Wayne Siffles (44) | White | Summerville, Georgia | |
| 2023-12-23 | Taylor Torres (29) | Hispanic | Tulsa, Oklahoma | |
| 2023-12-23 | Brady Lynn Beck (57) | White | League City, Texas | A vehicle stolen from Houston was reported in a Walmart parking lot in League City. When the suspect returned to the car, officers attempted to arrest him. According to police and a witness, the man pulled a handgun on officers, leading them to shoot him. |
| 2023-12-23 | Michael Dotel (30) | Black | New York City, New York | Officers responded to a reported domestic dispute in the Bedford Park neighborhood of The Bronx and encountered a woman exiting an apartment with knife wounds to the face. When they entered the apartment, they found a man holding his mother in a headlock while holding a knife. According to police officers told the man to drop the knife several times before shooting him. |
| 2023-12-22 | Jason Rose (42) | White | Weirton, West Virginia | |
| 2023-12-21 | Samuel Tripp III (59) | White | Zebulon, North Carolina | |
| 2023-12-21 | Johnathan Bady (31) | Black | Germantown, Tennessee | |
| 2023-12-21 | Vaughn Malloy | Unknown | Stonington, Connecticut | Police attempted to arrest Malloy on charges from Norwich. Few details were released, but police say Malloy shot and killed a state police K-9 before officers shot him. |
| 2023-12-20 | unidentified male | Unknown | Detroit, Michigan | |
| 2023-12-20 | Tristan Decedric Clark (24) | Black | Tuscaloosa, Alabama | Police pulled over Clark and several others during a narcotics investigation. During the stop Clark allegedly tried to reach for a gun in his waistband, leading police to shoot him. |
| 2023-12-20 | David Estrada (38) | Hispanic | Denver, Colorado | |
| 2023-12-19 | Myron Ham (39) | Black | Sebring, Florida | Police responded to reports of a fire on the side of the road and found Ham and a woman burning the woman's son's belongings. Ham wrapped the boy in a burning blanket and placed him in the fire, though he escaped with minor injuries. Deputies then shot and killed Ham after he allegedly attacked them with a pole. |
| 2023-12-17 | Melissa Tompkins (40) | White | Strasburg, Virginia | |
| 2023-12-17 | Tobias Ganey (60) | White | Martinsburg, West Virginia | |
| 2023-12-17 | Jamel C. Hill Moore (41) | Black | Marshall, Minnesota | |
| 2023-12-17 | Christopher Andrews (28) | White | Hillsboro, Oregon | |
| 2023-12-17 | unidentified male | White | Hosford, Florida | |
| 2023-12-17 | Kyle Desmarais (42) | White | Portland, Maine | Police pulled over Desmarais, who was suspected of an aggravated assault earlier in the day. After being pulled over Desmarais allegedly exited his vehicle and pointed a gun at officers, who shot and killed him. |
| 2023-12-17 | Jeanette Alatorre (51) | White | Boulder, Colorado | |
| 2023-12-16 | Trei Michael Adriec Hernandez | Hispanic | Austin, Texas | |
| 2023-12-16 | Michael Shamrock Robertson Sr. (71) | Unknown | Stafford, Virginia | |
| 2023-12-16 | Sanrico McGill (33) | Black | Charlotte, North Carolina | During a fight, McGill pulled out a gun and actively shooting. Police officers subsequently shot and killed him. |
| 2023-12-16 | Alton Tungovia (37) | Native American | Phoenix, Arizona | |
| 2023-12-15 | Kelly Mason (48) | White | Grants Pass, Oregon | |
| 2023-12-14 | Kenneth Clark (30) | Black | Louisville, Kentucky | |
| 2023-12-14 | Kent Edwards (43) | Black | New York City, New York | Officers surrounded an apartment on the Lower East Side of Manhattan to confront a shooting suspect. Officers shot and killed Edwards after he allegedly fired a weapon at them, striking one. |
| 2023-12-14 | Payton Lawrence (19) | Black | Mesquite, Texas | Mesquite police officers followed a stolen vehicle to a parking lot, where they were confronted by six suspects. An officer discharged his weapon, killing Lawrence. Video of the shooting was released on December 21. |
| 2023-12-13 | Kody Olsen (45) | White | Tacoma, Washington | Police attempted to conduct a traffic stop on a vehicle being driven by the victim due to a possible DUI. The victim fled in the vehicle until coming to a dead end. Police claim the victim shot at police who returned fire, striking the victim. The victim was taken to a nearby hospital where he died 4 days later due to injuries form the shooting. |
| 2023-12-13 | Jose Peña Mejia (34) | Latino | Fontana, California | Peña fled a traffic stop and was shot and killed by police after he allegedly brandished a firearm at officers. |
| 2023-12-13 | unidentified male (33) | Unknown | Pontiac, Michigan | Police attempted to make a traffic stop on a vehicle suspected of involvement in a shooting, but the driver fled, causing a police chase. When police stopped the driver, he allegedly made a threatening motion towards officers, causing them to shoot him dead. |
| 2023-12-13 | Deon W. Watson (51) | Black | Bridgeport Charter Township, Michigan | Michigan State Police officers were attempting to arrest a suspect on multiple felony warrants. Watson allegedly fled and shot and wounded a trooper, causing officers to shoot him dead. |
| 2023-12-13 | William C. Barber III | White | St. Albans, West Virginia | Barber was fatally shot by police when he allegedly advanced towards officers wielding a knife. |
| 2023-12-12 | Kevin Ray Mills (53) | White | Seagraves, TX | A car chase ended in an officer-involved shooting when the suspect allegedly charged a Texas Parks and Wildlife Department warden, causing the warden to fatally shoot the suspect. |
| 2023-12-12 | Delwyn Jewvany Pinto (37) | Unknown | McAllen, Texas | Pinto, a stabbing suspect, allegedly charged officers with a knife and was shot and killed. |
| 2023-12-11 | Wesley Adam Wells (41) | White | Greenwood, Texas | Wells was shot and killed by officers responding to an aggravated assault. |
| 2023-12-11 | Michael Johnson (38) | Black | Little Rock, Arkansas | Police responded to reports of shots fired at a hotel. They shot and killed Johnson in the parking lot after he allegedly refused to drop a gun he was carrying. |
| 2023-12-11 | Bryon Scheuring (32) | White | Shenandoah, Pennsylvania | Scheuring, a burglary suspect, allegedly lunged at an officer with a knife during a search of a home, causing officers to shoot him dead. |
| 2023-12-10 | Gerald Battaglia (75) | Unknown | Monroe, Louisiana | A murder suspect allegedly set his house on fire and fired a gun at responding police. Officers shot and killed him. |
| 2023-12-10 | Darvet Brown (35) | Black | San Bernardino, California | Brown allegedly pointed a gun at a 3-year-old boy during a domestic disturbance, causing officers to shoot her dead. |
| 2023-12-10 | Darren Evans (33) | Unknown | Thurston County, Washington | Evans, a murder suspect, was shot and killed by police during a confrontation at a casino. |
| 2023-12-10 | Ray Garcia (27) | Hispanic | San Antonio, Texas | Police responded to a domestic disturbance. Garcia fled and was shot and killed by police after a confrontation in which he allegedly took an officer's gun. |
| 2023-12-10 | Michael Antonio Cobb Jr. (23) | Black | Griffin, Georgia | Cobb allegedly fired shots at people outside a residence before fleeing. He later returned to the scene and was shot dead by a deputy. |
| 2023-12-09 | unidentified female | Unknown | Grand Prairie, Texas | Police responded to a woman being assaulted. Another woman was shot and killed at the scene after she allegedly pointed a gun at responding officers. |
| 2023-12-08 | Othel Moore Jr. (38) | Black | Columbia, Missouri | Correctional officers were sweeping one of the housing units for contraband. Moore was pepper sprayed twice, retrained, and covered with a mask and was left in a position that caused him to suffocate. 4 guards were charged with felony murder and the fifth was charged with manslaughter. |
| 2023-12-08 | Manuel Guillen (34) | Hispanic | Lubbock, Texas | Guillen allegedly assaulted his mother and brandished knives at responding officers. He was shot and killed by police after he reportedly charged officers with two knives. |
| 2023-12-08 | Daniel James Rivera (25) | Hispanic | New Bern, North Carolina | Police were serving a warrant on a wanted fugitive when the fugitive, Rivera, allegedly brandished a gun. Officers shot and killed him. |
| 2023-12-07 | Mark Carlson (32) | White | Albuquerque, New Mexico | Carlson, a suspect in a series of robberies, fled police during an attempted arrest. He was shot and killed by police after he allegedly brandished a firearm. |
| 2023-12-07 | Brandon Keys (24) | Black | Saint Paul, Minnesota | As police responded to a call from Keys's girlfriend, Keys exchanged gunfire with an officer, allegedly wounding one officer and being killed in the gunfight. |
| 2023-12-07 | Curtis Harris (46) | Black | San Diego, California | Police confronted Harris outside a shopping mall during an investigation. Harris allegedly shot at officers, wounding one, causing officers to return fire and kill him. |
| 2023-12-07 | David Michael Kitchens (35) | White | Whitmire, South Carolina | Police responded to a person trying to break into a house and firing a gun. They found Kitchens allegedly armed with a rifle and shot and killed him. |
| 2023-12-06 | Maria Schwab (56) | Hispanic | Chicago, Illinois | An off-duty Chicago Police Department officer struck and killed Schwab with her vehicle in the River North district. |
| 2023-12-06 | Caleb Briggs (34) | White | Reno, Nevada | Briggs was killed in an officer-involved shooting after he was confronted by police during a call. |
| 2023-12-06 | Anthony James Polito (67) | White | Las Vegas, Nevada | Polito shot and killed three people and wounded three others at the University of Nevada, Las Vegas. Two police officers exchanged gunfire with Polito and killed him. |
| 2023-12-06 | Shaqwan Cribbs (22) | Black | Amory, Mississippi | Police responded to a person firing a gun. Cribbs allegedly exchanged gunfire with officers, resulting in his death. |
| 2023-12-06 | Ryan Joseph Smith (26) | Black | Riverside, California | Smith allegedly brandished a firearm during a vehicle search, causing police to shoot and kill him. |
| 2023-12-06 | Isaac L. Seavey (27) | White | Portland, Oregon | Seavey was shot and killed by police responding to a theft call. He was allegedly armed with a handgun. |
| 2023-12-05 | Shannon Rose (39) | White | Manchester, New Jersey | Rose, who was allegedly carrying a gun, was shot and killed by two police officers. |
| 2023-12-05 | Zachary J. Fornash (24) | White | Canton, Ohio | Fornash was shot and killed by police allegedly responding to reports of a man with a firearm. |
| 2023-12-05 | Joseph Agada Ejeh (44) | Black | Bellevue, Washington | Ejeh, who was allegedly armed with a knife, was shot and killed by police at a gym after he reportedly advanced towards officers. |
| 2023-12-05 | David Longoria (39) | Hispanic | Lubbock, Texas | Longoria, a suspect in a previous shooting, fled law enforcement on foot. He was shot dead by police after allegedly pointing a handgun at officers. |
| 2023-12-04 | Niani Finlayson (27) | Black | Lancaster, California | Finlayson was shot dead by a Los Angeles County Sheriff's deputy after she called to report her ex-boyfriend threatening her with a knife. The deputy shot and killed Finlayson after she allegedly brandished a "large knife" and advanced towards her ex-boyfriend. In 2020 the deputy had shot and killed an unarmed man while responding to a different domestic violence call. |
| 2023-12-04 | Wesley Ingrim (28) | White | Lake St. Louis, Missouri | Police investigated a man firing shots at Boulevard Park. They attempted to question Ingrim, who was fatally shot when he allegedly pointed two guns at police. |
| 2023-12-03 | Robert Reynolds Sr. (60) | White | Bethlehem, Georgia | Police responding to a domestic dispute were allegedly confronted by an armed Reynolds. He was fatally shot by three officers. |
| 2023-12-03 | Scottie Stacy (57) | White | Washington County, Arkansas | A man fled a traffic stop and eventually crashed into a field following a police chase. The man allegedly rammed his vehicle into an officer's patrol car, causing the officer to shoot and kill the man. |
| 2023-12-03 | Joseph Tyler Goodson (32) | White | Woodstock, Alabama | Goodson, known for his appearance on the investigative podcast S-Town, was shot and killed by police following a three-hour standoff. He allegedly brandished a firearm at officers. |
| 2023-12-03 | Troy Anspaw (54) | Native American | Broken Arrow, Oklahoma | Anspaw allegedly exited his vehicle with a firearm during a traffic stop, causing officers to fatally shoot him. |
| 2023-12-03 | Douglas Alan Phipps (34) | White | O'Fallon, Missouri | Phipps allegedly fired shots at O'Fallon City Hall before being shot and killed by police following a chase. |
| 2023-12-03 | Kerry Jones-Hilburg (34) | White | Spokane, Washington | Jones-Hilburg, a suspected shoplifter, allegedly engaged in a fight with police in a Walmart parking lot, in which Jones-Hilburg was shot and killed and two officers were physically assaulted. |
| 2023-12-03 | Daniel Stowe (50) | White | Wichita, Kansas | Police responding to a domestic violence call found Stowe allegedly making threats to harm himself. Stowe was shot and killed by police after allegedly brandishing a firearm at officers. |
| 2023-12-03 | David Adam McFall (39) | White | Roanoke, Virginia | Police investigating a homicide approached McFall, who opened fire on police, critically wounding an officer. McFall was shot and killed by police. |
| 2023-12-03 | Courtney Gordon (38) | Black | New York City, New York | In the Far Rockaway neighborhood of Queens, Gordon stabbed four family members to death. He also stabbed and wounded two responding NYPD police officers before being shot dead. |
| 2023-12-02 | Nathaniel Smith (24) | White | Fort Towson, Oklahoma | Police responded to a disturbance at a bar. They allegedly exchanged gunfire with Smith in the parking lot, killing him. |
| 2023-12-02 | Edwin Joey Villegas (23) | Hispanic | Houston, Texas | A burglary suspect allegedly ambushed an officer, shooting him several times. Another officer returned fire and killed the suspect. |
| 2023-12-01 | Jeremy Loving (39) | Unknown | Prague, Oklahoma | Police responding to a domestic disturbance shot and killed Loving after he allegedly attempted to attack an officer with a knife. |
| 2023-12-01 | Lisa Davis (63) | White | Los Angeles, California | Police responded to an assault with a deadly weapon and a house fire in the Chatsworth neighborhood. A woman allegedly armed with a gun was fatally shot by police at the scene following a confrontation. |
| 2023-12-01 | Cristopher Jordan (57) | Black | Fort Myers, Florida | Police responded to a man threatening his disabled sister with a firearm. Jordan retreated inside the house and was shot and killed after a 45-minute standoff when he allegedly pointed his gun at officers. |
| 2023-12-01 | Stephen Ruiz Romero (33) | Hispanic | Lansing, Michigan | Romero, a domestic violence suspect, was shot and killed by police while allegedly armed with a handgun. |
| 2023-12-01 | Jack Murray (24) | White | Elk Grove Village, Illinois | Police responded to a home about an armed man. Murray, who was allegedly armed with a knife, was shot dead by police. |
| 2023-12-01 | Ian Anzer (44) | White | Sandy, Utah | A United States Marshals Service officer shot and killed Anzer, a wanted fugitive, at a senior living center. According to police, Anzer was shot while arming himself with a knife, but his family questioned this statement. |
| 2023-12-01 | Jorge Cardenas (27) | Hispanic | Victorville, California | Cardenas shot and severely wounded a police officer responding to a man with a gun at an Arco gas station at 13660 Bear Valley Road. Another officer returned fire and killed Cardenas. |
| 2023-12-01 | Jonathan Yi (45) | Asian | Houston, Texas | A man was shot and killed by police after he allegedly ambushed officers with a gun during an investigation. |
| 2023-12-01 | Jovan Washington (33) | Black | West Haven, Connecticut | Washington was killed after he shot a police officer in the leg at his apartment. |

== See also ==
- Death in custody § United States
- Henry A. Wallace Police Crime Public Database
- List of cases of police brutality
- List of countries with annual rates and counts for killings by law enforcement officers
- List of law enforcement officers killed in the line of duty in the United States
- List of law enforcement officers convicted for an on-duty killing in the United States
- List of shootings by US immigration agents
- List of police reforms related to the George Floyd protests
- List of unarmed African Americans killed by law enforcement officers in the United States
- Lists of killings by law enforcement officers
- Police brutality in the United States
- Police misconduct § United States
- Police riot § United States
- Police use of deadly force in the United States
