= Dameron City, Texas =

Ghost town in Texas, US

Dameron City
- Ghost town
- Interactive map of Dameron City
- Coordinates: 31.9333°N 102.0167°W
- Country: United States
- State: Texas
- County: Midland
- Founded: 1911

Dameron City is a ghost town in Midland County, Texas, United States. It was founded in 1911.
