= Chub, Texas =

Unincorporated community in Texas, US

Coordinates: 32°01′26″N 102°01′09″W

Chub is an unincorporated community in Midland County, Texas, United States.

== History ==
Chub was likely founded in the 1880s when the Texas and Pacific Railway was extended to that point.
