= Greenwood Independent School District =

School district in Texas

Greenwood Independent School District is a public school district based in the community of Greenwood, Texas (USA). Greenwood ISD serves approximately 3,000 students. The district's mascot is the ranger/rangerette. As of 2024, Ariel Elliott is the superintendent. In 2009, the school district was rated "academically acceptable" by the Texas Education Agency.

It is entirely in unincorporated Midland County.

== Schools ==
- Greenwood High School (Grades 9-12) Principal: Stacy Jones
- James R. Brooks Middle School (Grades 6-8) Principal: Kristi Griffin
- Greenwood Intermediate School (Grades 3-5) Principal: Heather Bennett
- Greenwood Elementary School (Grades PK-2) Principal: Leslie Goodrum
