= Mixon, Texas =

- Unincorporated community
- Location within the state of Texas Mixon (the United States)
- Coordinates: 32°5′20″N 95°12′37″W
- Country: United States
- State: Texas
- County: Cherokee
- Elevation: 407 ft (124 m)
- Time zone: UTC-6 (Central (CST))
  - Summer (DST): UTC-5 (CDT)
- Area codes: 430, 903
- GNIS feature ID: 1378693

Mixon is a small unincorporated community in northern Cherokee County, Texas, United States. According to the Handbook of Texas, the community had a population of 50 in 2000. It is located within the Tyler-Jacksonville combined statistical area.

== History ==
The area in what is known as Mixon today was first settled in the 1850s and was originally called Pine Springs. By the middle of that decade, it had a church and a cemetery. The community itself was not founded until the post office was established in 1889. In the mid-1890s, Mixon had a general store, a cotton gin, two gristmills, and 75 inhabitants. The post office shut down in 1907, but only lost five residents and had two stores in 1940. All businesses closed after World War II and only a few scattered houses and two Baptist churches remained in the early 1990s. Its population was 50 from 1990 through 2000.

== Geography ==
Mixon is located at the intersection of Texas State Highway 135 and Farm to Market Roads 2493 and 3052, 20 mi (32 km) north of Rusk in northern Cherokee County. It is also located 11 mi (18 km) northeast of Jacksonville, 6 mi (9.7 km) southwest of Troup, 29 mi (47 km) south of Tyler, and 5 mi (8.0 km) east of Mount Selman.

== Education ==
A school was established in Mixon in the 1850s and was still standing in the mid-1890s and 1940. It closed after World War II. Today, the community is served by the Troup Independent School District.

== Notable person ==
- D. N. Jackson, a Baptist pastor who founded the Baptist Missionary Association of America, held his last pastorate at First Baptist Church in Mixon.
