= Helen Mayfield =

American artist (1939–1997)

- Born: 1939; Houston, Texas, U.S.
- Died: 1997 (aged 57–58)
- Education: South West Texas State University
- Occupation: Artist

Helen Burkhart Mayfield (1939–1997) was an American artist from Texas.

Mayfield was born in Houston and raised in Blanco, Texas. After graduating from high school, she attended South West Texas State University, where she majored in art and met her future husband, Martin Mayfield. Before moving back to Austin, Texas, the two lived in New York City, where they took part in various Broadway productions. After returning to Texas, Mayfield taught modern dance, established the Renaissance Market, for people to sell their art and handicrafts, and produced many drawings and paintings.

In 1964, she worked as an assistant occupational therapist in the psychiatric institution where Eddie Arning was committed. Mayfield is responsible for introducing Arning to painting and encouraging his talents. In 1965, Mayfield organized the first showing of Arning's art, introducing him to the art world.

In the 1980s, Mayfield began living on the streets and would clothe herself in different costumes and fabrics and performing street art.
