= Farm to Market Road 1171 =

Road in Texas, United States

Farm to Market Road 1171
- Cross Timbers Road

Route information
- Maintained by TxDOT
- Length: 14.935 mi (24.036 km)
- Existed: 1949–present

Major junctions
- West end: I-35W in Northlake
- US 377 in Flower Mound
- East end: I-35E / US 77 in Lewisville

Location
- Country: United States
- State: Texas
- Counties: Denton

Highway system
- Highways in Texas; Interstate; US; State; Former; Toll; Loops; Spurs; FM/RM; Park; Rec
← FM 1170	→ FM 1172

Farm to Market Road 1171 (FM 1171) is a farm to market road in Denton County, Texas.

== Route description ==
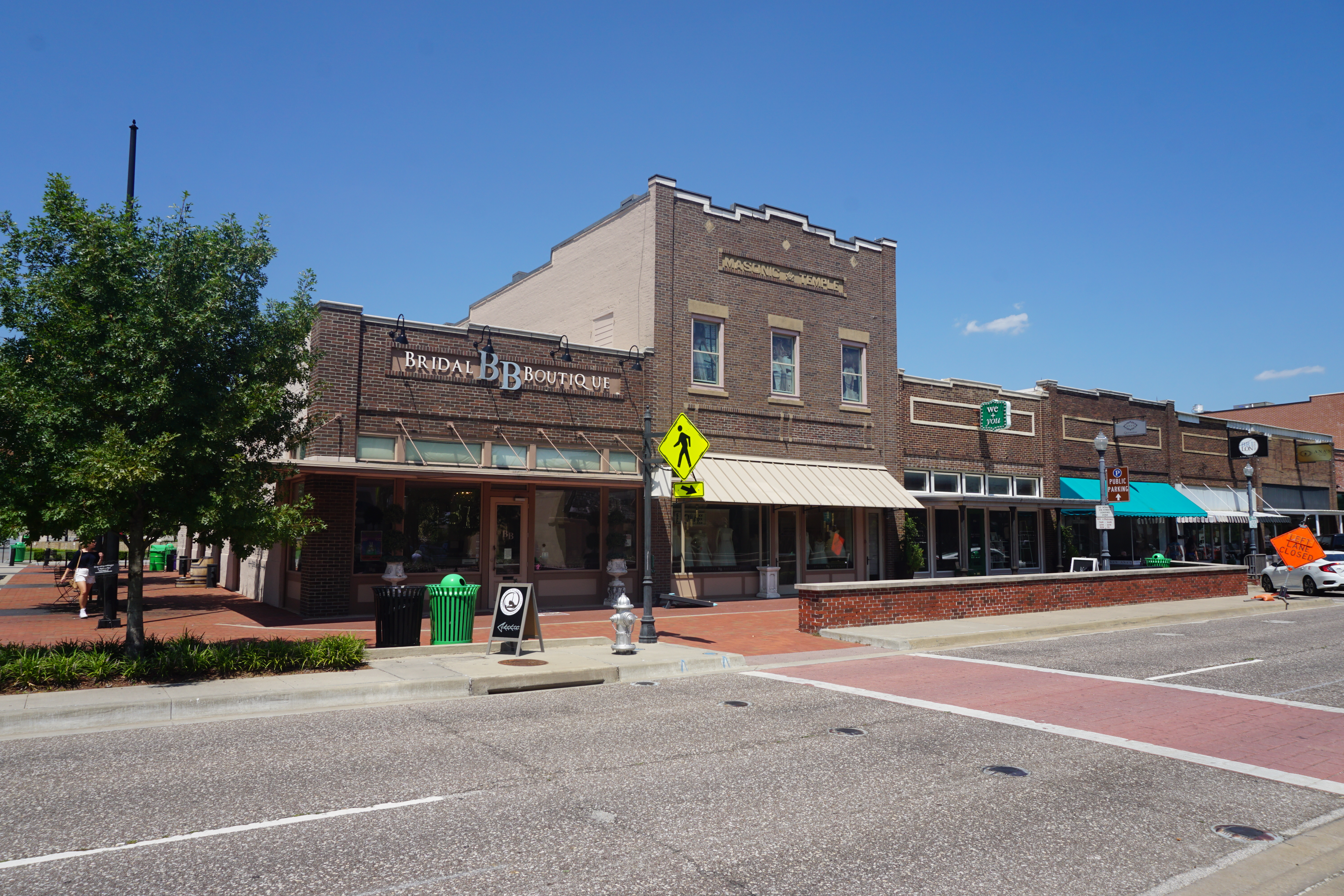
FM 1171 as West Main Street in Lewisville

FM 1171 begins at I-35W in Northlake. In Flower Mound, the road is known as Cross Timbers Road, and it has a junction with US 377. It serves as a major arterial for eastern Flower Mound and Lewisville, where it is known as that city's Main Street. FM 1171 continues through central Lewisville before the designation ends at I-35E; Main Street continues into eastern Lewisville as a four-lane road, which was formerly part of the 1171 designation but was later removed.

== History ==
FM 1171 was first designated on March 30, 1949 from proposed US 77 west 5.3 miles (8.5 km) to a county road; at that time, the Lewisville area was undeveloped, and current alignment of US 77 (now superseded by the Interstate 35E freeway) had yet to be constructed. On June 30, 1955, Loop 187 was combined with the route, extending it eastward to the original route of SH 121 through eastern Lewisville. FM 1171 was extended westward through Lewisville to US 377 on June 28, 1963, and then to the Interstate 35W freeway on November 5, 1971.

A spur route of FM 1171 existed from August 1, 1963 to May 30, 1990; it connected with mainline FM 1171 east of I-35E and traveled south along Mill Street to an intersection with SH 121. This mileage was transferred to FM 3504, which had been cancelled on June 28, 2012 at the request of the city of Lewisville.

On June 27, 1995, the designation of the section east of US 377 to SH 121 was transferred to Urban Road 1171 (UR 1171). On December 18, 2003, the eastern portion, from I-35E to the former route of SH 121 (now Business SH 121), was removed from the state highway system at the request of the City of Lewisville. The designation of the extant section reverted to FM 1171 with the elimination of the Urban Road system on November 15, 2018.

=== Future Extension ===
Due to growth in Denton County, TxDOT is planning a 3.5 mile western extension of FM1171, starting at Farm to Market Road 156 near Justin and ending at the current I-35W western terminus of the existing road. The planned extension would be six lanes at each end and four lanes in the middle.

== Major intersections ==
The entire route is in Denton County.

Location	mi	km	Destinations	Notes
Northlake	0.0	0.0	I-35W – Denton, Ft. Worth	I-35W exit 74; western terminus.
Flower Mound	2.6	4.2	US 377 – Argyle, Roanoke	
Flower Mound	10.9	17.5	FM 2499 (Long Prairie Rd.) – Highland Village, Grapevine	
Lewisville	14.9	24.0	I-35E / US 77 – Denton, Dallas	I-35E exit 452; eastern terminus.
1.000 mi = 1.609 km; 1.000 km = 0.621 mi
