= Germania, Texas =

Ghost town in Texas, US

Coordinates: 32°03′53″N 101°56′24″W

Germania is a ghost town in Midland County, Texas, United States.

== History ==
The town was founded in 1883. There was a post office from 1884 to 1887.
