= Daniel Webster Wallace Unit =

State prison for men in Texas

Coordinates: 32°24′02″N 100°52′50″W

- Interactive map of Daniel Webster Wallace Unit
- Location: 1675 South FM 3525 Colorado City, Texas
- Status: open
- Security class: G1, G2, G4
- Capacity: 1428
- Opened: May 1994
- Managed by: Texas Department of Criminal Justice

The Daniel Webster Wallace Unit is a state prison for men located near Colorado City in Mitchell County, Texas, owned and operated by the Texas Department of Criminal Justice. This facility was opened in May 1994, and holds a maximum of 1428 male prisoners, held at security levels G1, G2 and G4.

The facility is adjacent to the state's Dick Ware Transfer Facility.
