= Midland County, Texas =

County in Texas, United States

- County
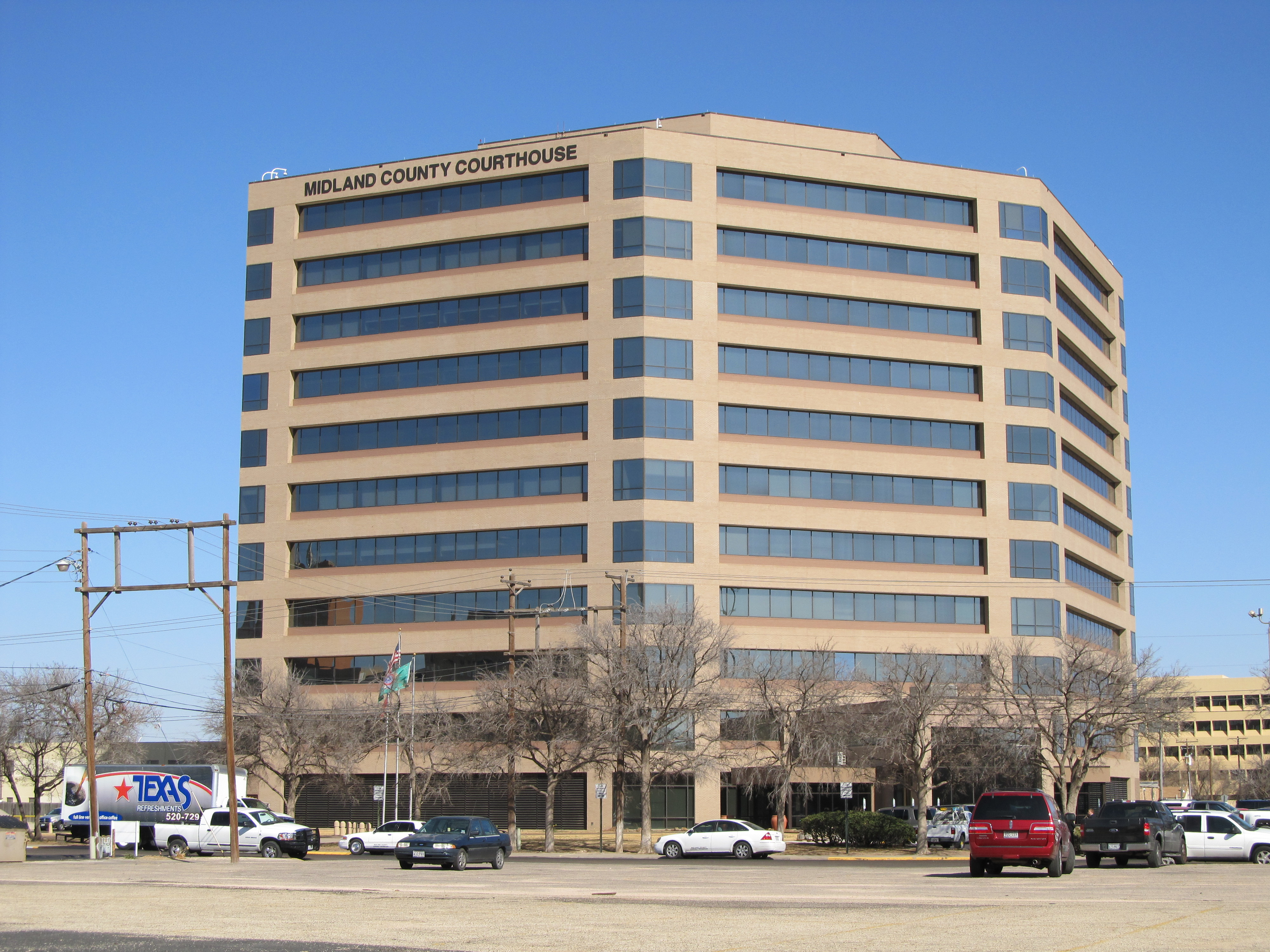
- The Midland County Courthouse in Midland

- Seal

- Location within the U.S. state of Texas
- Coordinates: 31°53′N 102°01′W
- Country: United States
- State: Texas
- Founded: 1885
- Named for: Midland, Texas
- Seat: Midland
- Largest city: Midland

Area
  - Total: 902 sq mi (2,340 km^{2})
  - Land: 900 sq mi (2,300 km^{2})
  - Water: 1.8 sq mi (4.7 km^{2}) 0.2%

Population (2020)
  - Total: 169,983
  - Estimate (2025): 187,855 ▲
  - Density: 190/sq mi (73/km^{2})
- Time zone: UTC−6 (Central)
  - Summer (DST): UTC−5 (CDT)
- Congressional district: 11th
- Website: www.co.midland.tx.us

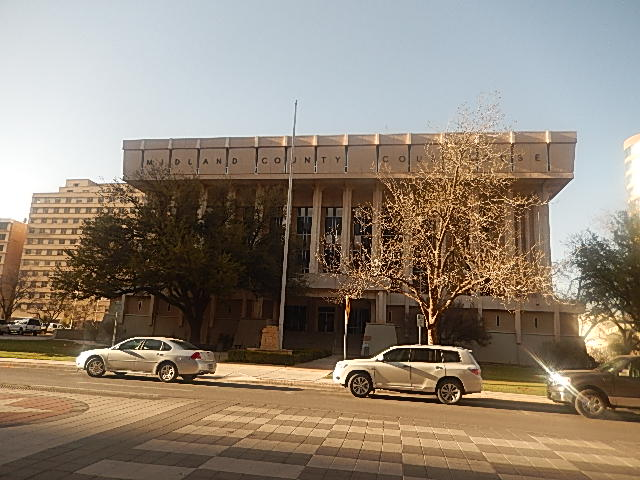
Former Midland County courthouse marked for razing

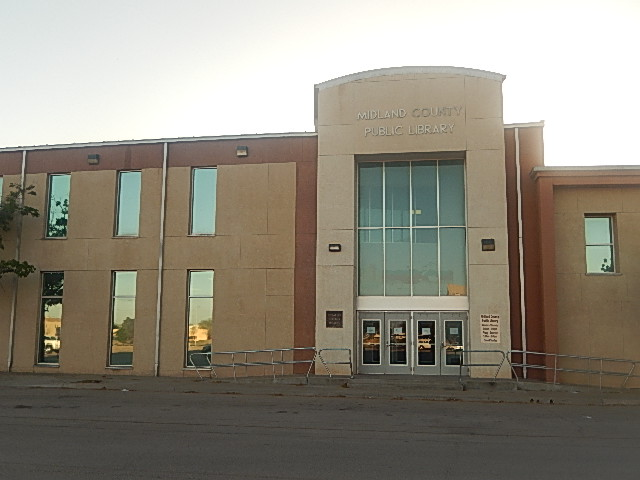
Midland County Public Library in Midland

Midland County is a county located in the U.S. state of Texas. As of 2020, the population was 169,983. The county seat is Midland. The county is so named for being halfway (midway) between Fort Worth and El Paso on the Texas and Pacific Railway. Midland County is included in the Midland, TX Metropolitan Statistical Area as well as the Midland–Odessa Combined Statistical Area.

== History ==
In 1968, the county lost before the Supreme Court in Avery v. Midland County which required local districts to be nearly equal. The city of Midland had most of the county's population but only elected one of the five county commissioners, which was found to violate the Fourteenth Amendment.

== Geography ==
According to the U.S. Census Bureau, the county has a total area of 902 square miles (2,340 km^{2}), of which 900 square miles (2,300 km^{2}) is land and 1.8 square miles (4.7 km^{2}) (0.2%) is water. The Spraberry Trend, the third-largest oil field in the United States by remaining reserves, underlies much of the county.

=== Major highways ===
- I-20
- I-20 BL
- SH 137
- SH 140
- SH 158
- SH 191
- SH 349 (Nadine and Tom Craddick Highway)
- Loop 40
- Loop 250
- Loop 268
- Spur 588

=== Adjacent counties ===
- Martin County (north)
- Glasscock County (east)
- Upton County (south)
- Ector County (west)
- Andrews County (northwest)
- Reagan County (southeast)

== Demographics ==
Historical population
Census	Pop.	Note	%±
1890	1,033		—
1900	1,741		68.5%
1910	3,464		99.0%
1920	2,449		−29.3%
1930	8,005		226.9%
1940	11,721		46.4%
1950	25,785		120.0%
1960	67,717		162.6%
1970	65,433		−3.4%
1980	82,636		26.3%
1990	106,611		29.0%
2000	116,009		8.8%
2010	136,872		18.0%
2020	169,983		24.2%
2025 (est.)	187,855	▲	10.5%
U.S. Decennial Census; 1850–2010 2010 2020

=== Racial and ethnic composition ===
Midland County, Texas – Racial and ethnic composition Note: the US Census treats Hispanic/Latino as an ethnic category. This table excludes Latinos from the racial categories and assigns them to a separate category. Hispanics/Latinos may be of any race.
Race / Ethnicity (NH = Non-Hispanic)	Pop 1980	Pop 1990	Pop 2000	Pop 2010	Pop 2020	% 1980	% 1990	% 2000	% 2010	% 2020
White alone (NH)	62,650	74,499	72,015	72,822	76,487	75.81%	69.88%	62.08%	53.20%	45.00%
Black or African American alone (NH)	7,000	8,016	7,940	8,675	10,465	8.47%	7.52%	6.84%	6.34%	6.16%
Native American or Alaska Native alone (NH)	211	347	415	552	686	0.26%	0.33%	0.36%	0.40%	0.40%
Asian alone (NH)	272	837	1,040	1,639	3,891	0.33%	0.79%	0.90%	1.20%	2.29%
Native Hawaiian or Pacific Islander alone (NH)	x	x	16	42	152	x	x	0.01%	0.03%	0.09%
Other race alone (NH)	180	132	52	211	621	0.22%	0.12%	0.04%	0.15%	0.37%
Mixed race or Multiracial (NH)	x	x	855	1,331	4,350	x	x	0.74%	0.97%	2.56%
Hispanic or Latino (any race)	12,323	22,780	33,676	51,600	73,331	14.91%	21.37%	29.03%	37.70%	43.14%
Total	82,636	106,611	116,009	136,872	169,983	100.00%	100.00%	100.00%	100.00%	100.00%

=== 2020 census ===
As of the 2020 census, the county had a population of 169,983. The median age was 33.2 years. 27.6% of residents were under the age of 18 and 10.8% of residents were 65 years of age or older. For every 100 females there were 102.0 males, and for every 100 females age 18 and over there were 101.2 males age 18 and over.

The racial makeup of the county was 57.9% White, 6.5% Black or African American, 0.9% American Indian and Alaska Native, 2.3% Asian, 0.1% Native Hawaiian and Pacific Islander, 13.2% from some other race, and 19.1% from two or more races. Hispanic or Latino residents of any race comprised 43.1% of the population.

86.3% of residents lived in urban areas, while 13.7% lived in rural areas.

There were 60,882 households in the county, of which 38.5% had children under the age of 18 living in them. Of all households, 52.1% were married-couple households, 19.6% were households with a male householder and no spouse or partner present, and 22.3% were households with a female householder and no spouse or partner present. About 23.9% of all households were made up of individuals and 7.4% had someone living alone who was 65 years of age or older.

There were 70,309 housing units, of which 13.4% were vacant. Among occupied housing units, 68.3% were owner-occupied and 31.7% were renter-occupied. The homeowner vacancy rate was 1.6% and the rental vacancy rate was 21.7%.

=== 2000 census ===
As of the census of 2000, there were 116,009 people, 42,745 households, and 30,947 families residing in the county. The population density was 129 people per square mile (50 people/km^{2}). There were 48,060 housing units at an average density of 53 units per square mile (20/km^{2}). The racial makeup of the county was 77.32% White, 6.98% Black or African American, 0.64% Native American, 0.93% Asian, 0.03% Pacific Islander, 12.17% from other races, and 1.92% from two or more races. 29.03% of the population were Hispanic or Latino of any race.

There were 42,745 households, out of which 38.90% had children under the age of 18 living with them, 57.40% were married couples living together, 11.40% had a female householder with no husband present, and 27.60% were non-families. 24.20% of all households were made up of individuals, and 8.60% had someone living alone who was 65 years of age or older. The average household size was 2.68 and the average family size was 3.21.

In the county, the population was spread out, with 30.20% under the age of 18, 8.80% from 18 to 24, 28.40% from 25 to 44, 20.90% from 45 to 64, and 11.60% who were 65 years of age or older. The median age was 34 years. For every 100 females there were 93.40 males. For every 100 females age 18 and over, there were 89.40 males.

The median income for a household in the county was $39,082, and the median income for a family was $47,269. Males had a median income of $36,924 versus $24,708 for females. The per capita income for the county was $20,369. 12.90% of the population and 10.30% of families were below the poverty line. Out of the total people living in poverty, 16.20% are under the age of 18 and 7.90% are 65 or older.

== Oil and gas industry ==
Midland County ranks #1 in the state of Texas for total oil production and #2 for total gas production. Oil and gas data from the Texas Railroad Commission reports 6,602 currently producing wells as of September 2020.

== Politics ==
Midland County was one of the first areas of Texas to turn Republican, beginning with native son Dwight D. Eisenhower's campaign for the presidency in 1952. The last Democratic presidential candidate to win the county was Harry Truman in 1948. Even in the presidential election of 1964 in which the incumbent president, Texan Democrat Lyndon B. Johnson, won a national landslide victory, it gave 57.8% of its ballots to Republican presidential candidate and Arizona native Barry Goldwater. This is the last time a Democrat managed 40 percent of the county's vote, and one of only two since 1948 that a Democrat has won even 30 percent of the vote. Despite this, conservative Democrats held most local offices well into the 1980s.

Midland County is located in Texas's 11th congressional district, represented by Republican August Pfluger. The 11th Congressional District gave George W. Bush 78% of its votes in 2004, higher than any other congressional district in the nation.

United States presidential election results for Midland County, Texas
Year	Republican		Democratic		Third party(ies)	
Year	No.	%	No.	%	No.	%
1912	10	4.08%	215	87.76%	20	8.16%
1916	24	6.47%	339	91.37%	8	2.16%
1920	68	19.94%	271	79.47%	2	0.59%
1924	44	9.84%	399	89.26%	4	0.89%
1928	347	49.57%	350	50.00%	3	0.43%
1932	136	9.70%	1,245	88.80%	21	1.50%
1936	190	13.31%	1,229	86.06%	9	0.63%
1940	646	25.14%	1,921	74.75%	3	0.12%
1944	302	10.31%	1,688	57.63%	939	32.06%
1948	1,410	36.93%	2,032	53.22%	376	9.85%
1952	7,956	71.04%	3,244	28.96%	0	0.00%
1956	8,287	69.99%	3,468	29.29%	86	0.73%
1960	11,343	64.28%	5,842	33.11%	460	2.61%
1964	11,906	57.78%	8,646	41.96%	53	0.26%
1968	12,789	55.07%	4,756	20.48%	5,677	24.45%
1972	18,905	79.60%	4,388	18.48%	457	1.92%
1976	19,178	70.52%	7,725	28.41%	292	1.07%
1980	25,027	76.55%	6,839	20.92%	826	2.53%
1984	33,706	82.13%	7,214	17.58%	119	0.29%
1988	30,618	77.86%	8,487	21.58%	221	0.56%
1992	24,143	58.39%	9,160	22.15%	8,044	19.45%
1996	25,382	68.01%	9,513	25.49%	2,425	6.50%
2000	31,514	79.30%	7,534	18.96%	692	1.74%
2004	36,585	81.60%	8,005	17.85%	244	0.54%
2008	36,155	78.13%	9,691	20.94%	428	0.92%
2012	35,689	79.85%	8,286	18.54%	722	1.62%
2016	36,973	75.13%	10,025	20.37%	2,214	4.50%
2020	45,624	77.34%	12,329	20.90%	1,035	1.75%
2024	46,944	79.83%	11,351	19.30%	513	0.87%

United States Senate election results for Midland County, Texas1
Year	Republican		Democratic		Third party(ies)	
Year	No.	%	No.	%	No.	%
2024	45,032	77.40%	11,866	20.39%	1,284	2.21%

United States Senate election results for Menard County, Texas2
Year	Republican		Democratic		Third party(ies)	
Year	No.	%	No.	%	No.	%
2020	45,733	78.14%	11,417	19.51%	1,378	2.35%

Texas Gubernatorial election results for Midland County
Year	Republican		Democratic		Third party(ies)	
Year	No.	%	No.	%	No.	%
2022	32,389	80.87%	7,154	17.86%	510	1.27%

== Communities ==
=== Cities ===
- Midland (county seat) (small part in Martin County)
- Odessa (partly in Ector County)

=== Unincorporated communities ===
- Chub
- Cotton Flat
- Greenwood
- Spraberry
- Terminal
- Valley View
- Warfield

=== Ghost towns ===
- Dameron City
- Germania
- Pleasant
- Prairie Lee
- Slaughter

== Education ==
School districts:

- Midland Independent School District
- Greenwood Independent School District

Most areas in the county are within the service area of Midland College; however the Greenwood area is not within the Midland College service area.

== See also ==
- List of museums in West Texas
- National Register of Historic Places listings in Midland County, Texas
- Recorded Texas Historic Landmarks in Midland County
