= Lake Alan Henry =

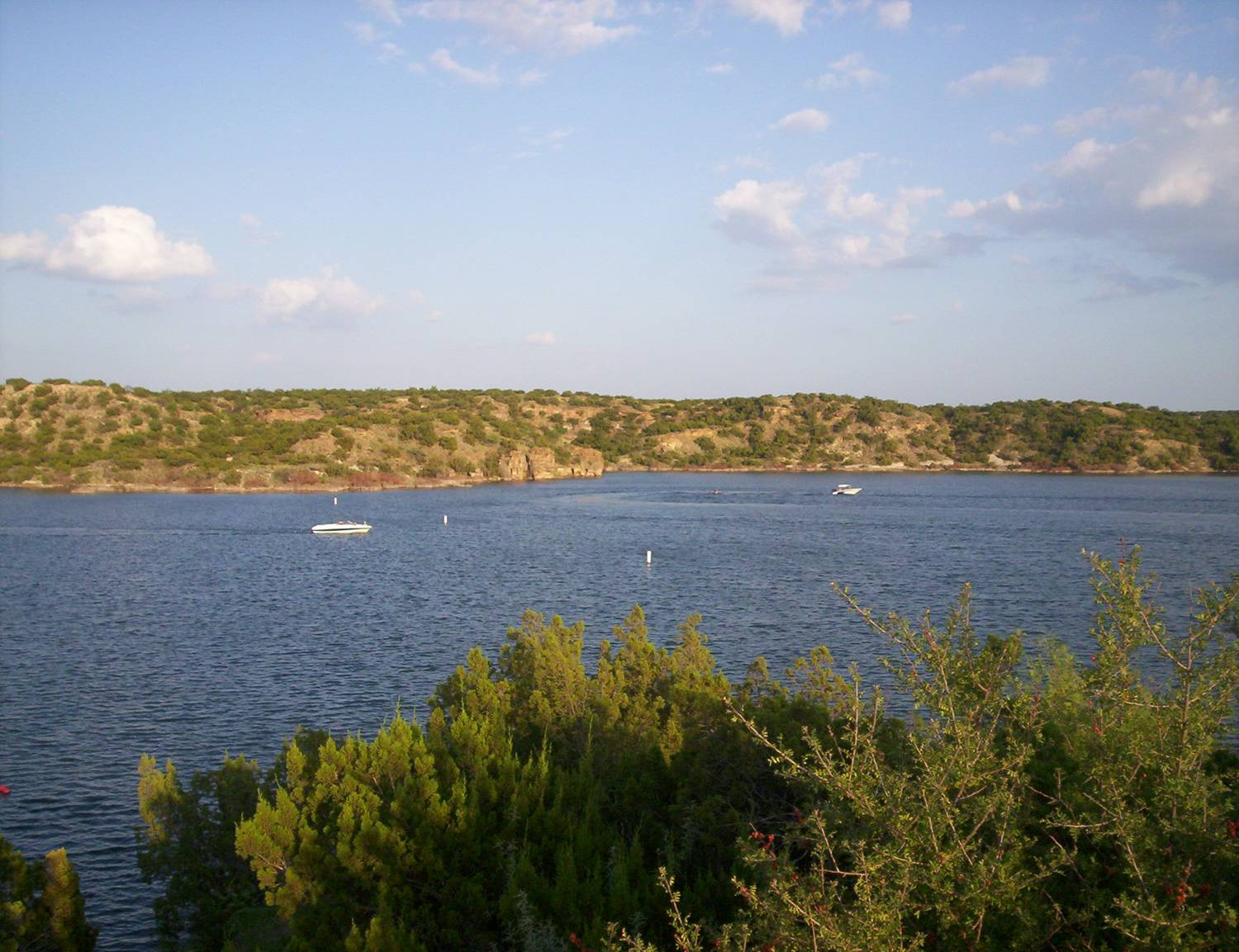

- Location within Texas Location within the United States
- Location: Garza County, Texas, United States
- Coordinates: 33°03′33.0″N 101°03′09.8″W
- Type: Reservoir
- Primary inflows: Double Mountain Fork Brazos River
- Basin countries: United States
- Surface area: 2,880 acres (1,170 ha)
- Average depth: 40 ft (12 m)
- Max. depth: 100 ft (30 m)
- Water volume: 96,207 acre⋅ft (0.118670 km^{3})
- Surface elevation: 2,220 ft (680 m)

Lake Alan Henry is a reservoir situated in the upper Brazos River Basin in the United States. Created by the construction of the John T. Montford Dam in 1993, it is operated and used as a future tertiary water supply by the city of Lubbock, Texas and serves as a recreational spot for the region of West Texas. The surface area of the lake is 2,880 acres (1,170 ha) with a mean depth of 40 ft (12 m). Lake Alan Henry is located 4 miles (6.4 km) east of Justiceburg, Texas, and 45 miles (72 km) south of Lubbock.

== Geography ==
Lake Alan Henry is located on the Double Mountain Fork Brazos River in West Texas. South of Lubbock and east of Justiceburg, the lake extends 11 miles (18 km) and has over 56 miles (90 km) of shoreline. Its elevation is 1,000 ft (300 m) lower than the city of Lubbock. Lake Alan Henry has a maximum depth of 100 ft (30 m) with an average depth of 40 ft (12 m), and the water is typically murky-to-clear with a visibility depth of one to four feet. Lake water levels fluctuate moderately between two and four feet per year. Vegetation of the lake mainly consists of flooded trees.

Operating at full capacity, Lake Alan Henry could potentially contain over 40 billion gallons of water.

=== Fish populations ===
Lake Alan Henry has been stocked with several different populations of fish in order to encourage recreational and fishing activities. Stocking of the lake began in 1993 with adult shads and gizzards. Between 1993 and 1994, Lake Alan Henry was stocked with largemouth bass, white crappie, smallmouth bass, channel catfish, and other assorted fish by the Texas Parks and Wildlife Department. Currently, a consumption advisory is in place for certain species of fish found in the lake due to concerns of high levels of mercury.

== History ==
In the 1960s, the city of Lubbock moved forward with plans to create another water source for its growing population, and after years of soil studies and engineering research, the current location of the John T. Montford Dam was chosen as the closest and most suitable area for the structure and subsequent reservoir. After an application was approved by the Army Corps of Engineers, design work on the dam began in the 1980s. Construction started in 1991, and after two years, the dam was completed and began operation in 1993. The dam was named in honor of Senator John Thomas Montford for his efforts in legislation concerning the reservoir; likewise, Lake Alan Henry was named for a former mayor of Lubbock.

In 1994, as the reservoir began to fill, a water sampling program was created by Lubbock city officials in order to establish baseline water quality data. Before its water can be officially utilized, it is projected three pumping stations, a new water treatment plant, and 65 miles (105 km) of the pipeline are needed to be established in-between Lubbock and Lake Alan Henry. This would have a predicted maximum yield of 23 million gallons of water per day for Lubbock.

Today, the lake is used primarily as a recreational spot for the surrounding areas; fishing, water skiing, hunting, and other outdoor activities (including hiking and camping) are the main draw for visitors to the lake. The Sam Wahl Recreational Area consists of over 580 acres (230 ha).

== See also ==
- Clear Fork Brazos River
- North Fork Double Mountain Fork Brazos River
- Salt Fork Brazos River
- White River (Texas)
