= Greenwood, Midland County, Texas =

Unincorporated community in Texas, US

Coordinates: 32°01′39″N 101°53′44″W

Greenwood is an unincorporated community in Midland County, Texas, Texas, United States. It is a suburb of Midland and is part of the Midland Metropolitan Statistical Area.

The Greenwood Independent School District serves area students.

== History ==
Greenwood first developed as a farming community in the 1890s. It had a population 32 from 1964 through 1989, and more than 50 in 1990.

Historical population
Year	Pop.	±%
1885	0	—
1964	32	—
1990	50 (est.)	—
2000	2,000	—
2019-2023	3,864	+93.2%
