= Best, Texas =

Unincorporated community in Texas, US

Coordinates: 31°13′29″N 101°37′16″W

Reagan County, Texas

Best is an unincorporated community in southwestern Reagan County in the western part of the U.S. state of Texas. It was portrayed in the Clyde Ragsdale novel The Big Fist.

== Location and population ==
Best is located in Reagan County, approximately 85 miles (135 km) west of San Angelo and 10 miles (16 km) west of the county seat Big Lake. In 2010, the town had a population of 1. It once was one of the four major communities in Reagan County according to the Handbook of Texas. Best was served by the Kansas City, Mexico and Orient Railway.

== History ==
Oil was discovered in 1923 about 5 miles (8 km) to the west at Texon. The town is reportedly named after Tom Best, an English stockholder of the Orient Railroad, which established a railroad switching station in the town in 1924. The town grew rapidly, reaching a population of 3,500 by 1925.

The rapid growth of the town was accompanied by a wild reputation, as portrayed in the Clyde Ragsdale novel, The Big Fist. A commonly used slogan was coined that "the town with the Best name in the world and worst reputation."

The population of the town declined after 1925 to 300 by 1945. In the late 1950s National Supply Company still operated an oilfield supply store. The population in 1990 was 25, and by 2010 had declined to just 1.
