= National Register of Historic Places listings in Reagan County, Texas =

Location of Reagan County in Texas

This is a list of the National Register of Historic Places listings in Reagan County, Texas.

This is intended to be a complete list of properties and districts listed on the National Register of Historic Places in Reagan County, Texas. There is one property listed on the National Register in the county which is both a State Antiquities Landmark and a Recorded Texas Historic Landmark.

This National Park Service list is complete through NPS recent listings posted March 21, 2025.

== Current listings ==
The locations of National Register properties may be seen in a mapping service provided.

	Name on the Register	Image	Date listed	Location	City or town	Description
1	Old Reagan County Courthouse	Old Reagan County Courthouse	May 5, 1978 (#78002976)	Off SH 137; 31°24′23″N 101°33′56″W	Stiles	State Antiquities Landmark, Recorded Texas Historic Landmark

== See also ==
- National Register of Historic Places listings in Texas
- Recorded Texas Historic Landmarks in Reagan County
