= Stiles, Texas =

- Ghost town
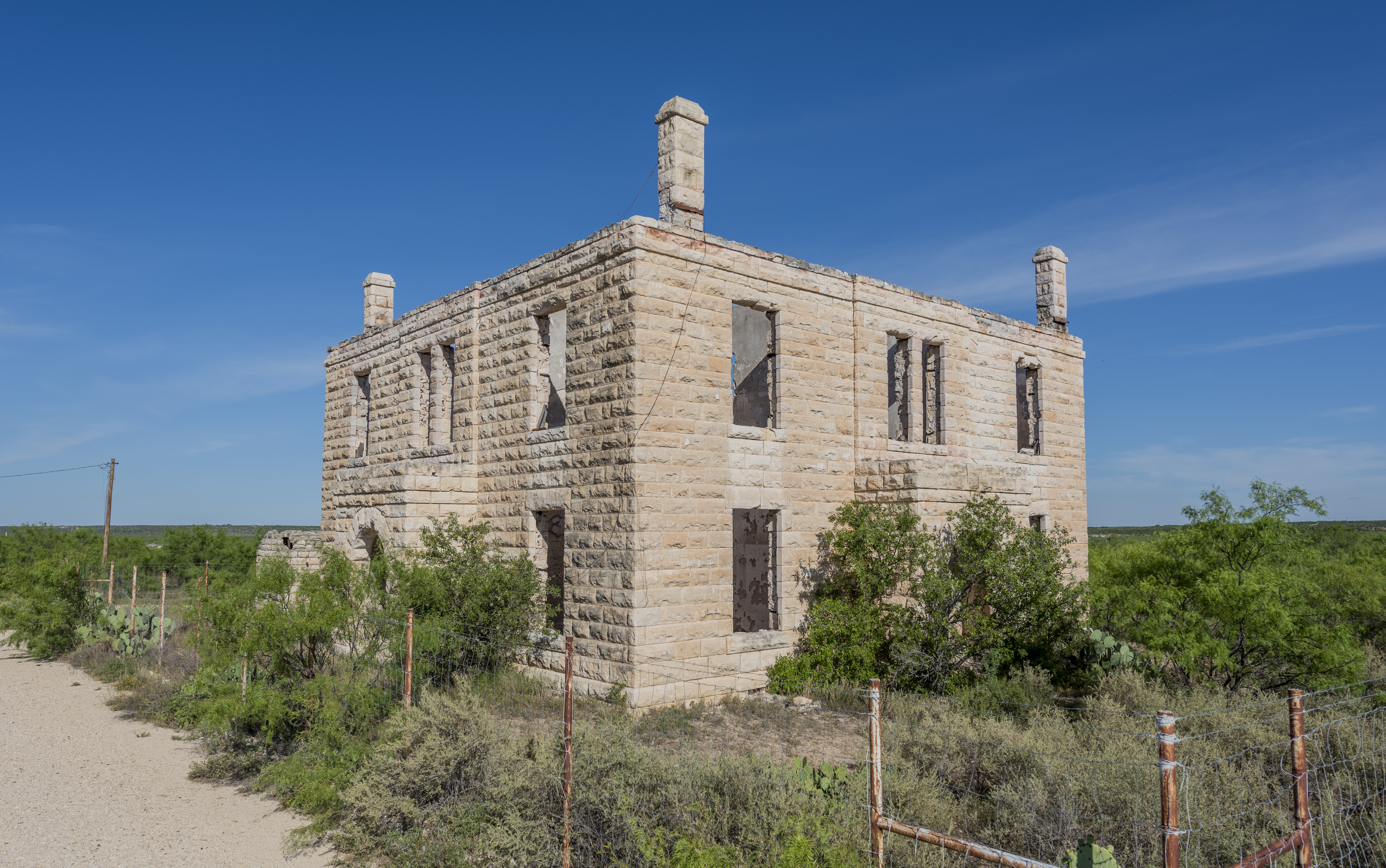
- Abandoned Reagan County Courthouse at Stiles

- Location of Stiles in Texas Stiles, Texas (the United States)
- Coordinates: 31°24′25″N 101°33′58″W
- Country: United States
- State: Texas
- County: Reagan
- Physiographic region: West Texas
- Founded: 1894
- Elevation: 2,549 ft (777 m)

Population (2000)
  - Total: 4
- Time zone: UTC-6 (Central (CST))
  - Summer (DST): UTC-5 (CDT)
- Postal code: 76932
- Area code: 325
- Website: Handbook of Texas

Stiles is a ghost town in Reagan County, Texas, United States, about 18 mi (29 km) north of Big Lake. As the only town in the area when Reagan County was established in 1903, Stiles was made the county seat. Bypassed by the railroad and eclipsed when oil was discovered near Big Lake, Stiles was replaced with Big Lake as the county seat in 1925.

== Stiles Courthouse ==
The ruins of the old 1911 Reagan County Courthouse are still visible just off Texas State Highway 137, between Big Lake and Texas State Highway 158 on Stiles Courthouse Loop. The courthouse was constructed with local stone by William Martin.

In 1998, the structure burned several times, damaging the courthouse. Ralph Denton was charged with arson for several fires in Reagan County.

== Stiles Cemetery ==
The Stiles Cemetery is located off SH 137 across the Centralia Draw, southwest of the courthouse.

Established in about 1903 on land owned by early settlers G. W. and Lizzie Stiles, the cemetery provides much frontier history. It holds graves of cowboys who died in accidents on the cattle range; one Spanish–American War veteran; victims of shootings, of rattlesnake bites, of epidemic dysentery. Most were pioneers of steady habits and quiet lives. Already in use for many years, the 3-acre plot was deeded to the county in 1920 by J. D. Wagner, an adventuring man who lived for years alternately in Texas and in South America.

== Centralia Draw ==
Stiles lies within an ancient stream channel called Centralia Draw that rises 13 mi (21 km) northeast of Rankin in eastern Upton County (31°19′N 101°52′W) and runs east for 43 mi (69 km) across Upton, Reagan, and Irion counties to the Middle Concho River. Today, Centralia Draw remains dry most of the year except during occasional brief periods of heavy rainfall and runoff. Evidence suggests that in the past a more active spring-fed stream once flowed through Centralia Draw cutting the broad valley we see today.

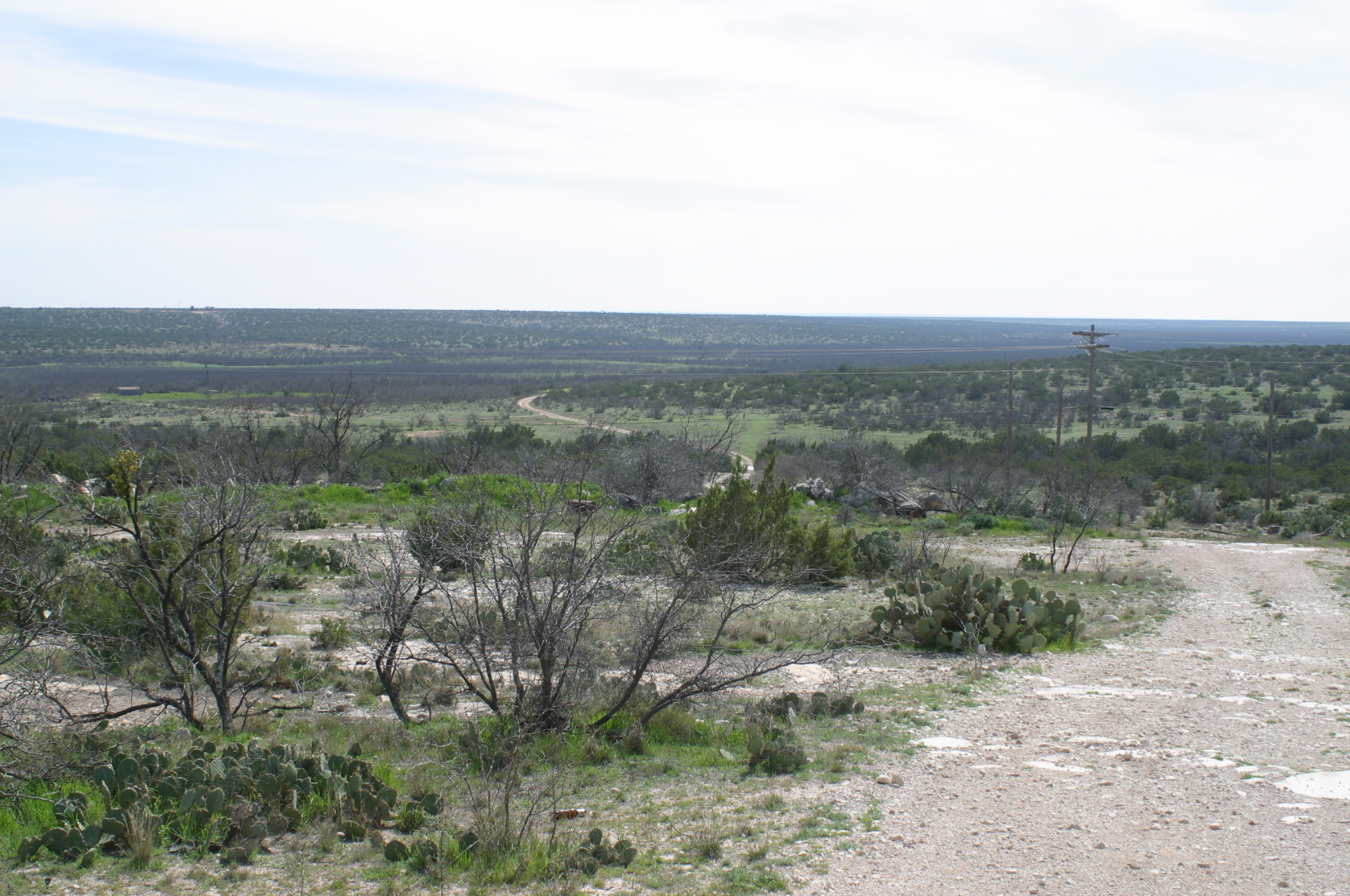
Broad valley of Centralia Draw just south of Stiles.

== See also ==
- List of ghost towns in Texas
- Llano Estacado
- Concho River
- Kansas City, Mexico and Orient Railway
