= KPDB =

Big Lake, Texas; United States
- Broadcast area: San Angelo
- Frequency: 98.3 MHz

Programming
- Language: Defunct (formerly Spanish)

Ownership
- Owner: Centro Cristiano De Fe

Technical information
- Licensing authority: FCC
- Facility ID: 83849
- Class: C2
- ERP: 50,000 watts
- HAAT: 131.0 meters (429.8 ft)
- Transmitter coordinates: 31°11′45.00″N 101°25′40.00″W

Links
- Public license information: Public file; LMS

KPDB (98.3 FM) was a radio station broadcasting a Spanish music format. Formerly licensed to Big Lake, Texas, United States, the station served the San Angelo area. The station was owned by Centro Cristiano De Fe.

== History ==
On January 22, 2003, the station was sold to Centro Cristiano De Fe.

The station's license was cancelled by the Federal Communications Commission on August 1, 2013 for failure to file an application for renewal.
