= Krupps =

Krupps may refer to:

- the Krupps, a German industrial dynasty
- Die Krupps, a German band
- Krups, a German kitchen appliance manufacturer

== See also ==
- Krupp (disambiguation)
