= Reagan County, Texas =

County in Texas, United States

- County
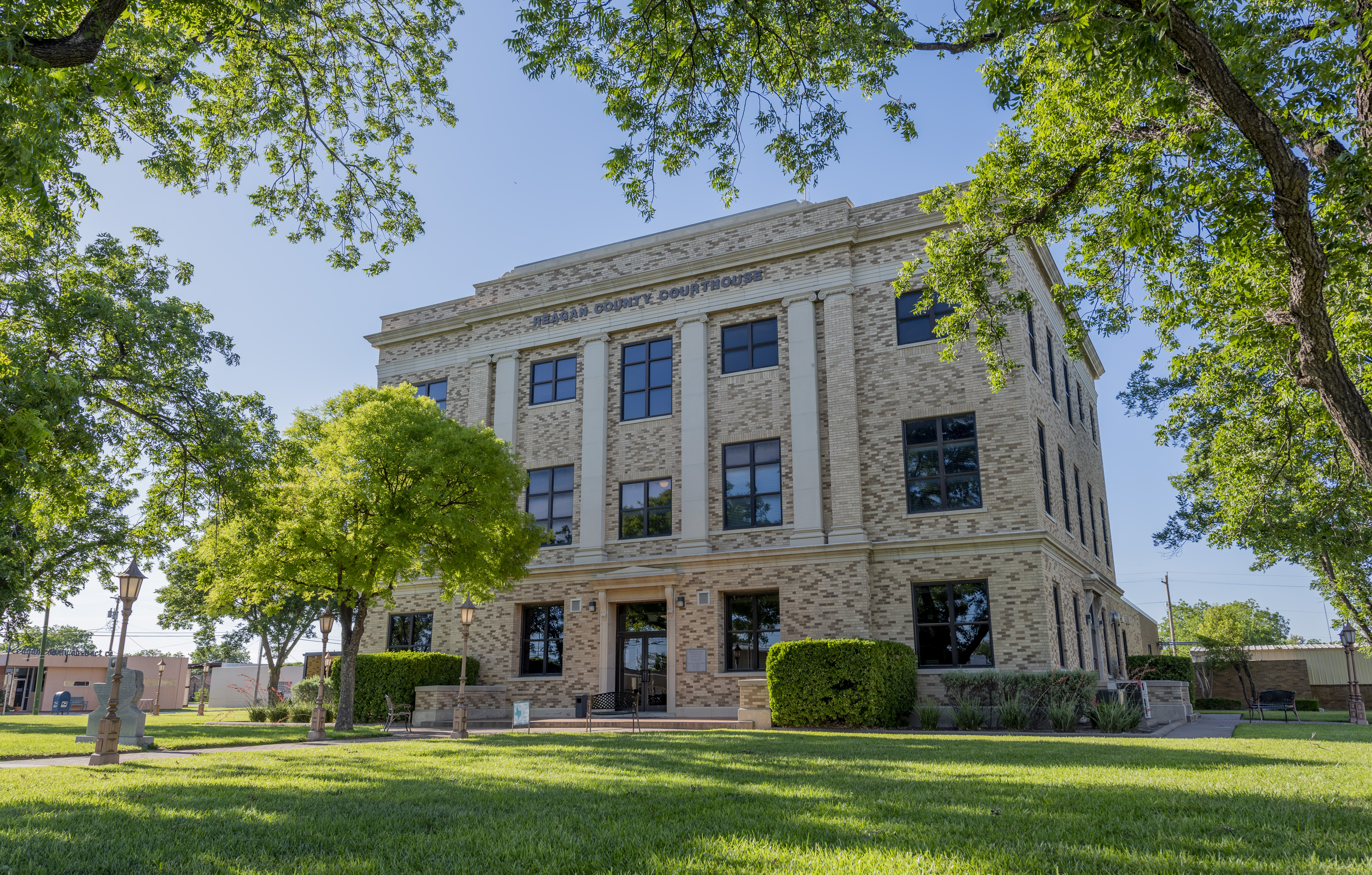
- The Reagan County Courthouse in Big Lake

- Location within the U.S. state of Texas
- Coordinates: 31°22′N 101°31′W
- Country: United States
- State: Texas
- Founded: 1903
- Named for: John Henninger Reagan
- Seat: Big Lake
- Largest city: Big Lake

Area
  - Total: 1,176 sq mi (3,050 km^{2})
  - Land: 1,175 sq mi (3,040 km^{2})
  - Water: 0.7 sq mi (1.8 km^{2}) 0.06%

Population (2020)
  - Total: 3,385
  - Estimate (2025): 3,166 ▼
  - Density: 2.9/sq mi (1.1/km^{2})
- Time zone: UTC−6 (Central)
  - Summer (DST): UTC−5 (CDT)
- Congressional district: 23rd
- Website: www.co.reagan.tx.us

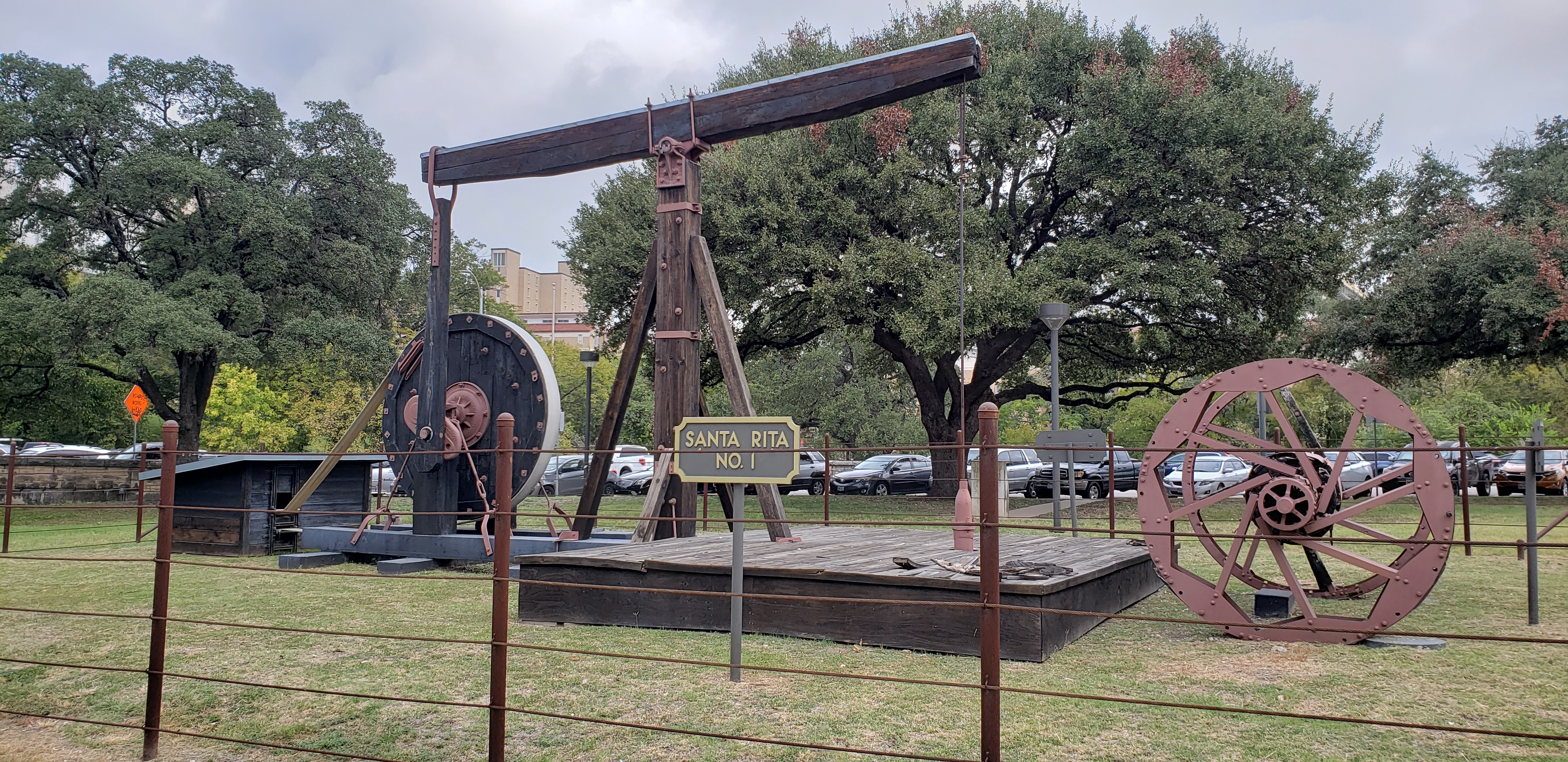
Santa Rita No. 1 rig, used in the discovery of the Big Lake Oil Field in 1923.

Reagan County is a county on the Edwards Plateau in the U.S. state of Texas. As of the 2020 census, its population was 3,385. The county seat is Big Lake. The county is named after John Henninger Reagan (1818–1905), who was the postmaster general of the Confederate States and also a U.S. senator, U.S. representative, and first chairman of the Railroad Commission of Texas.

== History ==
The region was first inhabited by Paleo-Indian, Suma-Jumano, Kiowa and Comanche peoples. Captains Hernán Martín and Diego del Castillo explored the region in 1650. In 1684, Juan Domínguez de Mendoza and Nicolás López reported on local indigenous groups.

Butterfield Overland Mail, which operated from 1858 to 1861, crossed through the center of the county. In 1878, Camp Grierson's Spring was established as a subpost of Fort Concho and named in honor of Col. Benjamin H. Grierson.

In 1903, Reagan County was carved from Tom Green County and named for United States Senator John Henninger Reagan. Stiles, named after local rancher William G. Stiles, became the first county seat. The Kansas City, Mexico and Orient of Texas Railway was completed in 1911.

In 1923, oil was discovered at the Big Lake Oilfield in the Permian Basin. Big Lake Oilfield, located on University of Texas System land, opened the Permian Basin to oil production and endowed the Permanent University Fund. The rig was named Santa Rita #1 for The Patron Saint of the Impossible. Big Lake was incorporated as a city. In 1924, shortly after the oil boom, the town community of Best plunged into vice and violence, necessitating the intervention of the Texas Rangers. The Rangers destroyed buildings that were being used as brothels, gambling houses, and saloons. In 1925, the county seat was moved to Big Lake by a vote. The following year, the Big Lake Oil Company established Texon for its employees and their families, with a devotion to family life.

In 1951, there was a renewed oil boom from production in the Spraberry Trend.

== Geography ==
According to the U.S. Census Bureau, the county has a total area of 1,176 square miles (3,050 km^{2}), of which 1,175 square miles (3,040 km^{2}) are land and 0.7 square miles (1.8 km^{2}) (0.06%) is covered by water. The Spraberry Trend, the third-largest oil field in the United States by remaining reserves, underlies much of the county.

=== Major highways ===
- U.S. Highway 67
- State Highway 137
- Ranch to Market Road 33

=== Adjacent counties ===
- Glasscock County (north)
- Sterling County (northeast)
- Tom Green County (east)
- Irion County (east)
- Crockett County (south)
- Upton County (west)
- Midland County (northwest)

== Demographics ==
Historical population
| Census | Pop. | Note | %± |
|---|---|---|---|
| 1910 | 392 | | — |
| 1920 | 377 | | −3.8% |
| 1930 | 3,028 | | 703.2% |
| 1940 | 1,997 | | −34.0% |
| 1950 | 3,127 | | 56.6% |
| 1960 | 3,782 | | 20.9% |
| 1970 | 3,239 | | −14.4% |
| 1980 | 4,135 | | 27.7% |
| 1990 | 4,514 | | 9.2% |
| 2000 | 3,326 | | −26.3% |
| 2010 | 3,367 | | 1.2% |
| 2020 | 3,385 | | 0.5% |
| 2025 (est.) | 3,166 | ▼ | −6.5% |
U.S. Decennial Census; 1850–2010 2010 2020

=== 2020 census ===
As of the 2020 census, the county had a population of 3,385. The median age was 34.4 years. 29.0% of residents were under the age of 18 and 11.7% of residents were 65 years of age or older. For every 100 females there were 105.5 males, and for every 100 females age 18 and over there were 106.5 males age 18 and over.

The racial makeup of the county was 51.3% White, 1.2% Black or African American, 0.9% American Indian and Alaska Native, 0.6% Asian, <0.1% Native Hawaiian and Pacific Islander, 22.5% from some other race, and 23.4% from two or more races. Hispanic or Latino residents of any race comprised 67.4% of the population.

<0.1% of residents lived in urban areas, while 100.0% lived in rural areas.

There were 1,189 households in the county, of which 42.4% had children under the age of 18 living in them. Of all households, 56.0% were married-couple households, 19.8% were households with a male householder and no spouse or partner present, and 20.4% were households with a female householder and no spouse or partner present. About 20.0% of all households were made up of individuals and 7.4% had someone living alone who was 65 years of age or older.

There were 1,474 housing units, of which 19.3% were vacant. Among occupied housing units, 71.2% were owner-occupied and 28.8% were renter-occupied. The homeowner vacancy rate was 0.3% and the rental vacancy rate was 22.4%.

=== Racial and ethnic composition ===
Reagan County, Texas – Racial and ethnic composition Note: the US Census treats Hispanic/Latino as an ethnic category. This table excludes Latinos from the racial categories and assigns them to a separate category. Hispanics/Latinos may be of any race.
| Race / Ethnicity (NH = Non-Hispanic) | Pop 1980 | Pop 1990 | Pop 2000 | Pop 2010 | Pop 2020 | % 1980 | % 1990 | % 2000 | % 2010 | % 2020 |
|---|---|---|---|---|---|---|---|---|---|---|
| White alone (NH) | 2,653 | 2,458 | 1,545 | 1,219 | 968 | 64.16% | 54.45% | 46.45% | 36.20% | 28.60% |
| Black or African American alone (NH) | 153 | 108 | 94 | 65 | 33 | 3.70% | 2.39% | 2.83% | 1.93% | 0.97% |
| Native American or Alaska Native alone (NH) | 18 | 7 | 10 | 7 | 12 | 0.44% | 0.16% | 0.30% | 0.21% | 0.35% |
| Asian alone (NH) | 2 | 0 | 9 | 1 | 19 | 0.05% | 0.00% | 0.27% | 0.03% | 0.56% |
| Native Hawaiian or Pacific Islander alone (NH) | x | x | 0 | 0 | 1 | x | x | 0.00% | 0.00% | 0.03% |
| Other race alone (NH) | 8 | 0 | 0 | 1 | 6 | 0.19% | 0.00% | 0.00% | 0.03% | 0.18% |
| Mixed race or Multiracial (NH) | x | x | 22 | 23 | 63 | x | x | 0.66% | 0.68% | 1.86% |
| Hispanic or Latino (any race) | 1,301 | 1,941 | 1,646 | 2,051 | 2,283 | 31.46% | 43.00% | 49.49% | 60.91% | 67.44% |
| Total | 4,135 | 4,514 | 3,326 | 3,367 | 3,385 | 100.00% | 100.00% | 100.00% | 100.00% | 100.00% |

=== 2000 census ===
As of the 2000 census, 3,326 people, 1,107 households, and 872 families were residing in the county. The population density was 3 inhabitants per square mile (1.2/km^{2}). The 1,452 housing units had an average density of 1 per square mile (0.39/km^{2}). The racial makeup of the county was 64.64% White, 3.01% African American, 0.54% Native American, 0.27% Asian, 29.56% from other races, and 1.98% from two or more races. About 49.49% of the population were Hispanics or Latinos of any race.

Of the 1,107 households, 46.8% had children under 18 living with them, 68.1% were married couples living together, 7.2% had a female householder with no husband present, and 21.2% were not families. About 19.8% of all households were made up of individuals, and 7.5% had someone living alone who was 65 or older. The average household size was 2.96, and the average family size was 3.42.

In the county, the age distribution was 34.2% under 18, 7.6% from 18 to 24, 28.1% from 25 to 44, 19.9% from 45 to 64, and 10.3% who were 65 or older. The median age was 32 years. For every 100 females, there were 100.50 males. For every 100 females 18 and over, there were 100.50 males.

The median income for a household in the county was $33,231, and for a family was $36,806. Males had a median income of $31,228 versus $18,750 for females. The per capita income for the county was $13,174. About 9.3% of families and 11.8% of the population were below the poverty line, including 10.6% of those under age 18 and 23.6% of those age 65 or over.

== Communities ==
=== City ===
- Big Lake (county seat)

=== Unincorporated communities ===
- Best
- Texon

=== Ghost town ===
- Stiles

== Politics ==
United States presidential election results for Reagan County, Texas
| Year | Republican | | Democratic | | Third party(ies) | |
| Year | No. | % | No. | % | No. | % |
|---|---|---|---|---|---|---|
| 1912 | 0 | 0.00% | 34 | 100.00% | 0 | 0.00% |
| 1916 | 2 | 3.23% | 59 | 95.16% | 1 | 1.61% |
| 1920 | 0 | 0.00% | 49 | 100.00% | 0 | 0.00% |
| 1924 | 31 | 21.53% | 111 | 77.08% | 2 | 1.39% |
| 1928 | 387 | 62.82% | 229 | 37.18% | 0 | 0.00% |
| 1932 | 124 | 15.35% | 681 | 84.28% | 3 | 0.37% |
| 1936 | 66 | 12.15% | 477 | 87.85% | 0 | 0.00% |
| 1940 | 88 | 14.45% | 520 | 85.39% | 1 | 0.16% |
| 1944 | 53 | 10.19% | 426 | 81.92% | 41 | 7.88% |
| 1948 | 112 | 19.34% | 444 | 76.68% | 23 | 3.97% |
| 1952 | 533 | 53.62% | 460 | 46.28% | 1 | 0.10% |
| 1956 | 669 | 63.47% | 384 | 36.43% | 1 | 0.09% |
| 1960 | 489 | 43.24% | 621 | 54.91% | 21 | 1.86% |
| 1964 | 406 | 39.73% | 614 | 60.08% | 2 | 0.20% |
| 1968 | 454 | 40.83% | 370 | 33.27% | 288 | 25.90% |
| 1972 | 703 | 73.61% | 244 | 25.55% | 8 | 0.84% |
| 1976 | 666 | 53.97% | 563 | 45.62% | 5 | 0.41% |
| 1980 | 917 | 67.88% | 414 | 30.64% | 20 | 1.48% |
| 1984 | 1,079 | 81.50% | 243 | 18.35% | 2 | 0.15% |
| 1988 | 935 | 69.00% | 418 | 30.85% | 2 | 0.15% |
| 1992 | 651 | 52.08% | 337 | 26.96% | 262 | 20.96% |
| 1996 | 645 | 55.22% | 407 | 34.85% | 116 | 9.93% |
| 2000 | 959 | 76.41% | 282 | 22.47% | 14 | 1.12% |
| 2004 | 956 | 83.64% | 184 | 16.10% | 3 | 0.26% |
| 2008 | 795 | 79.98% | 197 | 19.82% | 2 | 0.20% |
| 2012 | 676 | 80.19% | 158 | 18.74% | 9 | 1.07% |
| 2016 | 709 | 78.43% | 167 | 18.47% | 28 | 3.10% |
| 2020 | 942 | 83.81% | 172 | 15.30% | 10 | 0.89% |
| 2024 | 800 | 84.30% | 141 | 14.86% | 8 | 0.84% |

United States Senate election results for Reagan County, Texas1
| Year | Republican | | Democratic | | Third party(ies) | |
| Year | No. | % | No. | % | No. | % |
|---|---|---|---|---|---|---|
| 2024 | 764 | 81.62% | 156 | 16.67% | 16 | 1.71% |

United States Senate election results for Reagan County, Texas2
| Year | Republican | | Democratic | | Third party(ies) | |
| Year | No. | % | No. | % | No. | % |
|---|---|---|---|---|---|---|
| 2020 | 893 | 83.54% | 154 | 14.41% | 22 | 2.06% |

Texas Gubernatorial election results for Reagan County
| Year | Republican | | Democratic | | Third party(ies) | |
| Year | No. | % | No. | % | No. | % |
|---|---|---|---|---|---|---|
| 2022 | 616 | 86.03% | 90 | 12.57% | 10 | 1.40% |

== Education ==
There is one school district, the Reagan County Independent School District.

All of the county is in the service area of Midland Community College.

== See also ==
- List of Recorded Texas Historic Landmarks in Reagan County
- National Register of Historic Places listings in Reagan County, Texas
