= Krupp (surname) =

Krupp is a German surname. Notable people with the surname include:

- Alfred Krupp, German steel manufacturer and inventor
- Alfried Krupp von Bohlen und Halbach, German industrialist and war criminal
- Bjorn Krupp, American-German ice hockey player, son of Uwe Krupp
- Ed Krupp, American astronomer
- Fred Krupp, American environmentalist
- Friedrich Alfred Krupp, German steel manufacturer and head of the company Krupp
- Friedrich Krupp, German steel manufacturer and founder of the Krupp family industry
- Gustav Krupp von Bohlen und Halbach,
- Helene Amalie Krupp, German diplomat and industrialist
- Hermann Krupp, Austrian entrepreneur, founder of the Austrian branch of the Krupp family
- Killer Karl Krupp, Dutch professional wrestler
- Haymon Krupp, American oilman and businessman
- Hans-Jürgen Krupp, German politician (SPD), professor and economist
- Therese Krupp, German industrialist
- Uwe Krupp, German ice hockey player

== See also ==
- Krupp
- Krupp (disambiguation)
- Krupp family
