= Midkiff, Texas =

Midkiff
- Unincorporated community
- Location within the state of Texas Midkiff (the United States)
- Coordinates: 31°37′58″N 101°50′23″W
- Country: United States
- State: Texas
- County: Upton County
- Elevation: 2,736 ft (834 m)
- Time zone: UTC-6 (Central (CST))
  - Summer (DST): UTC-5 (CDT)
- ZIP codes: 79755
- GNIS feature ID: 1341544

Midkiff is an unincorporated community in northeastern Upton County, Texas, United States. It lies along RM 2401 and FM 3095, north of the city of Rankin, the county seat of Upton County. Its elevation is 2,736 feet (834 m).

Founded in an oil boom in the early 1950s, Midkiff was named for a former community in nearby areas of Midland County. Its original proposed name was "Hadacol Corner": a welder from Denver City, Texas opened a gas station as the town's first business. His name was Donald John (D.J.) "Hadacol" Dardis, and he was known for the sandwiches he sold oilfield workers from the gas station, selling upwards of 350 sandwiches, 150 fried pies, and 35 cases of soda a day.

In 1952 Slim Willet wrote his song, "Hadacol Corners" about the town and the booming oil patch area, with specific mentions of Sprayberry (southeast of Midland at the corner of Texas State Highway 158 and Farm Road 1379); the inflation that came when the US went to war with Korea in the early 1950s; the temporary housing set up for the workforce; the sodas and sandwiches Dardis sold oilfield workers; and the older, previous Texas boom towns of Freer and Cheyenne (just outside of Kermit):

"Hadacol Corners, caliche road / Once it rained, once it snowed / Most of the time, the wind just blowed.

Sometimes I like to run and play / I drill all night and sleep all day / They're calling me the Sprayberry stray / I believe it's 30 miles to pay.

Used to try to live in town / The road is rough and dirty / Your car will last you 90 days / If you don't go over 30.

I drilled from Freer to Cheyenne / And Midland twice and back again / I love the life of a drilling man / I'll stay in Midland if I can.

Odessa's where I chased the girls / At home I never tarried / But now I'm staying home at night / After I got married.

My trailer house's set high on rocks / The sand just blows, it never stops / This rugged life I think it's tops / And now I just drink sody pops.

Don't think I'm not the oil patch boy / That used to give you trouble / Don't think that I'd not like to play / But living costs have doubled!"

The U.S. Postal Service objected to the Hadacol Corners name and so the town adopted the name Midkiff and the post office was established in September 1952. Several long-time residents recalled that during its boom, about 300 people lived in the area around Midkiff, with El Paso Natural Gas, Humble Oil, Magnolia Petroleum Company, Phillips Petroleum Company, and Sinclair Oil Corporation plus many independent operators working the field.

== Climate ==
According to the Köppen climate classification, Midkiff has a semiarid climate, BSk on climate maps.
