= 1940 United States presidential election in Texas =

- November 5, 1940

All 23 Texas votes to the Electoral College

Nominee	Franklin D. Roosevelt	Wendell Willkie
Party	Democratic	Republican
Home state	New York	New York
Running mate	Henry A. Wallace	Charles L. McNary
Electoral vote	23	0
Popular vote	909,974	212,692
Percentage	80.92%	18.91%
County results
Roosevelt
50–60%
60–70%
70–80%
80–90%
90–100%
Willkie
50–60%
60–70%
70–80%
80–90%
President before election
Franklin D. Roosevelt
Democratic
Elected President
Franklin D. Roosevelt
Democratic

The 1940 United States presidential election in Texas took place on November 5, 1940, as part of the 1940 United States presidential election. State voters chose 23 representatives, or electors, to the Electoral College, who voted for president and vice president.

As a former Confederate state, Texas had a history of Jim Crow laws, disfranchisement of its African-American and Mexican-American populations, and single-party Democratic rule outside local governments in a few Unionist German-American counties (chiefly Gillespie and Kendall) of Central Texas. Since 1930 no Republicans had served in either house of the Texas Legislature, and in his two 1930s landslides Franklin D. Roosevelt had won over 87 percent of Texas' ballots.

Texas' leaders were highly critical of Roosevelt's decision in 1940 to replace conservative Texan John Nance Garner with liberal Northerner Henry A. Wallace on the 1940 Democratic ticket. There was also severe opposition to Roosevelt in the German counties due to his policy of all out aid to the United Kingdom and France in World War II against their ancestral homeland. This was sufficient to marginally reduce Roosevelt's margin, but the incumbent president nonetheless easily won Texas with 80.92 percent of the popular vote against Wendell Willkie (R–New York), running with Senate Minority Leader Charles L. McNary, with 18.91 percent of the popular vote.

== Results ==
1940 United States presidential election in Texas
Party	Candidate	Votes	%
Democratic	Franklin D. Roosevelt (inc.)	909,974	80.92%
Republican	Wendell Willkie	212,692	18.91%
Prohibition	Roger Babson	925	0.08%
Socialist	Norman Thomas	728	0.06%
Communist	Earl Browder	212	0.02%
Total votes		1,124,531	100%

=== Results by county ===
1940 United States presidential election in Texas by county
County	Franklin Delano Roosevelt Democratic		Wendell Lewis Willkie Republican		Various candidates Other parties		Margin		Total votes cast
County	#	%	#	%	#	%	#	%	Total votes cast
Anderson	5,281	88.37%	688	11.51%	7	0.12%	4,593	76.86%	5,976
Andrews	440	94.42%	26	5.58%	0	0.00%	414	88.84%	466
Angelina	5,993	91.19%	572	8.70%	7	0.11%	5,421	82.49%	6,572
Aransas	536	79.17%	141	20.83%	0	0.00%	395	58.35%	677
Archer	1,904	87.30%	276	12.65%	1	0.05%	1,628	74.64%	2,181
Armstrong	891	91.48%	82	8.42%	1	0.10%	809	83.06%	974
Atascosa	1,922	82.00%	418	17.83%	4	0.17%	1,504	64.16%	2,344
Austin	1,404	50.02%	1,400	49.88%	3	0.11%	4	0.14%	2,807
Bailey	1,066	76.31%	330	23.62%	1	0.07%	736	52.68%	1,397
Bandera	881	66.89%	432	32.80%	4	0.30%	449	34.09%	1,317
Bastrop	2,492	83.18%	502	16.76%	2	0.07%	1,990	66.42%	2,996
Baylor	1,667	92.25%	139	7.69%	1	0.06%	1,528	84.56%	1,807
Bee	1,759	64.98%	948	35.02%	0	0.00%	811	29.96%	2,707
Bell	7,418	87.60%	1,050	12.40%	0	0.00%	6,368	75.20%	8,468
Bexar	38,214	67.40%	18,270	32.22%	212	0.37%	19,944	35.18%	56,696
Blanco	1,042	66.50%	520	33.18%	5	0.32%	522	33.31%	1,567
Borden	375	89.50%	44	10.50%	0	0.00%	331	79.00%	419
Bosque	3,083	83.78%	595	16.17%	2	0.05%	2,488	67.61%	3,680
Bowie	6,937	86.18%	1,107	13.75%	5	0.06%	5,830	72.43%	8,049
Brazoria	3,781	82.46%	799	17.43%	5	0.11%	2,982	65.04%	4,585
Brazos	4,151	86.90%	617	12.92%	9	0.19%	3,534	73.98%	4,777
Brewster	1,001	80.21%	245	19.63%	2	0.16%	756	60.58%	1,248
Briscoe	910	85.37%	154	14.45%	2	0.19%	756	70.92%	1,066
Brooks	670	76.57%	201	22.97%	4	0.46%	469	53.60%	875
Brown	4,523	87.06%	663	12.76%	9	0.17%	3,860	74.30%	5,195
Burleson	1,999	86.13%	319	13.74%	3	0.13%	1,680	72.38%	2,321
Burnet	2,177	90.26%	233	9.66%	2	0.08%	1,944	80.60%	2,412
Caldwell	3,499	84.13%	659	15.85%	1	0.02%	2,840	68.29%	4,159
Calhoun	935	85.94%	152	13.97%	1	0.09%	783	71.97%	1,088
Callahan	2,310	88.07%	309	11.78%	4	0.15%	2,001	76.29%	2,623
Cameron	6,035	63.98%	3,370	35.73%	28	0.30%	2,665	28.25%	9,433
Camp	1,343	86.93%	200	12.94%	2	0.13%	1,143	73.98%	1,545
Carson	1,636	81.80%	362	18.10%	2	0.10%	1,274	63.70%	2,000
Cass	3,126	87.32%	454	12.68%	0	0.00%	2,672	74.64%	3,580
Castro	1,000	81.57%	224	18.27%	2	0.16%	776	63.30%	1,226
Chambers	1,279	85.27%	219	14.60%	2	0.13%	1,060	70.67%	1,500
Cherokee	5,293	86.71%	801	13.12%	10	0.16%	4,492	73.59%	6,104
Childress	2,729	88.98%	335	10.92%	3	0.10%	2,394	78.06%	3,067
Clay	2,357	84.48%	427	15.30%	6	0.22%	1,930	69.18%	2,790
Cochran	765	85.86%	122	13.69%	4	0.45%	643	72.17%	891
Coke	967	90.71%	94	8.82%	5	0.47%	873	81.89%	1,066
Coleman	3,257	87.48%	454	12.19%	12	0.32%	2,803	75.29%	3,723
Collin	7,373	87.65%	1,028	12.22%	11	0.13%	6,345	75.43%	8,412
Collingsworth	2,034	86.70%	307	13.09%	5	0.21%	1,727	73.61%	2,346
Colorado	1,674	58.86%	1,166	41.00%	4	0.14%	508	17.86%	2,844
Comal	851	31.45%	1,852	68.44%	3	0.11%	-1,001	-36.99%	2,706
Comanche	3,226	84.08%	610	15.90%	1	0.03%	2,616	68.18%	3,837
Concho	1,310	87.33%	189	12.60%	1	0.07%	1,121	74.73%	1,500
Cooke	4,483	76.59%	1,358	23.20%	12	0.21%	3,125	53.39%	5,853
Coryell	3,155	85.16%	549	14.82%	1	0.03%	2,606	70.34%	3,705
Cottle	1,506	86.40%	237	13.60%	0	0.00%	1,269	72.81%	1,743
Crane	815	92.19%	68	7.69%	1	0.11%	747	84.50%	884
Crockett	420	76.09%	132	23.91%	0	0.00%	288	52.17%	552
Crosby	1,720	85.91%	276	13.79%	6	0.30%	1,444	72.13%	2,002
Culberson	303	86.82%	45	12.89%	1	0.29%	258	73.93%	349
Dallam	1,539	77.96%	427	21.63%	8	0.41%	1,112	56.33%	1,974
Dallas	49,431	74.74%	16,574	25.06%	131	0.20%	32,857	49.68%	66,136
Dawson	2,808	88.47%	361	11.37%	5	0.16%	2,447	77.10%	3,174
Deaf Smith	1,219	74.01%	423	25.68%	5	0.30%	796	48.33%	1,647
Delta	2,214	92.10%	190	7.90%	0	0.00%	2,024	84.19%	2,404
Denton	6,386	87.58%	899	12.33%	7	0.10%	5,487	75.25%	7,292
De Witt	2,056	54.23%	1,735	45.77%	0	0.00%	321	8.47%	3,791
Dickens	1,728	87.32%	246	12.43%	5	0.25%	1,482	74.89%	1,979
Dimmit	736	68.21%	340	31.51%	3	0.28%	396	36.70%	1,079
Donley	1,619	87.85%	213	11.56%	11	0.60%	1,406	76.29%	1,843
Duval	3,232	95.51%	151	4.46%	1	0.03%	3,081	91.05%	3,384
Eastland	5,818	84.48%	1,063	15.43%	6	0.09%	4,755	69.04%	6,887
Ector	2,783	85.92%	451	13.92%	5	0.15%	2,332	72.00%	3,239
Edwards	565	76.35%	175	23.65%	0	0.00%	390	52.70%	740
Ellis	7,881	91.87%	692	8.07%	5	0.06%	7,189	83.81%	8,578
El Paso	12,374	76.55%	3,764	23.28%	27	0.17%	8,610	53.26%	16,165
Erath	3,459	83.90%	646	15.67%	18	0.44%	2,813	68.23%	4,123
Falls	3,949	80.46%	958	19.52%	1	0.02%	2,991	60.94%	4,908
Fannin	7,478	90.36%	792	9.57%	6	0.07%	6,686	80.79%	8,276
Fayette	2,606	51.58%	2,441	48.32%	5	0.10%	165	3.27%	5,052
Fisher	2,260	91.61%	199	8.07%	8	0.32%	2,061	83.54%	2,467
Floyd	1,880	79.29%	484	20.41%	7	0.30%	1,396	58.88%	2,371
Foard	997	87.53%	142	12.47%	0	0.00%	855	75.07%	1,139
Fort Bend	3,101	80.57%	748	19.43%	0	0.00%	2,353	61.13%	3,849
Franklin	1,621	89.76%	183	10.13%	2	0.11%	1,438	79.62%	1,806
Freestone	3,514	87.85%	481	12.03%	5	0.13%	3,033	75.83%	4,000
Frio	1,012	80.83%	236	18.85%	4	0.32%	776	61.98%	1,252
Gaines	1,509	88.30%	197	11.53%	3	0.18%	1,312	76.77%	1,709
Galveston	11,161	81.87%	2,443	17.92%	28	0.21%	8,718	63.95%	13,632
Garza	1,073	83.96%	198	15.49%	7	0.55%	875	68.47%	1,278
Gillespie	487	13.15%	3,213	86.74%	4	0.11%	-2,726	-73.60%	3,704
Glasscock	268	86.17%	41	13.18%	2	0.64%	227	72.99%	311
Goliad	868	59.74%	580	39.92%	5	0.34%	288	19.82%	1,453
Gonzales	3,008	80.60%	722	19.35%	2	0.05%	2,286	61.25%	3,732
Gray	4,315	77.89%	1,217	21.97%	8	0.14%	3,098	55.92%	5,540
Grayson	12,530	90.25%	1,340	9.65%	14	0.10%	11,190	80.60%	13,884
Gregg	9,391	85.45%	1,584	14.41%	15	0.14%	7,807	71.04%	10,990
Grimes	2,899	90.62%	298	9.32%	2	0.06%	2,601	81.31%	3,199
Guadalupe	2,182	46.81%	2,473	53.06%	6	0.13%	-291	-6.24%	4,661
Hale	3,405	78.76%	906	20.96%	12	0.28%	2,499	57.81%	4,323
Hall	2,221	90.84%	219	8.96%	5	0.20%	2,002	81.88%	2,445
Hamilton	2,263	77.45%	655	22.42%	4	0.14%	1,608	55.03%	2,922
Hansford	725	82.39%	150	17.05%	5	0.57%	575	65.34%	880
Hardeman	2,453	87.14%	362	12.86%	0	0.00%	2,091	74.28%	2,815
Hardin	2,997	92.93%	226	7.01%	2	0.06%	2,771	85.92%	3,225
Harris	73,520	77.84%	20,797	22.02%	136	0.14%	52,723	55.82%	94,453
Harrison	4,515	86.89%	681	13.11%	0	0.00%	3,834	73.79%	5,196
Hartley	545	83.21%	110	16.79%	0	0.00%	435	66.41%	655
Haskell	2,941	87.79%	405	12.09%	4	0.12%	2,536	75.70%	3,350
Hays	2,371	83.84%	453	16.02%	4	0.14%	1,918	67.82%	2,828
Hemphill	868	83.62%	170	16.38%	0	0.00%	698	67.24%	1,038
Henderson	4,111	83.66%	803	16.34%	0	0.00%	3,308	67.32%	4,914
Hidalgo	7,471	60.81%	4,787	38.97%	27	0.22%	2,684	21.85%	12,285
Hill	6,002	90.54%	627	9.46%	0	0.00%	5,375	81.08%	6,629
Hockley	2,382	89.92%	261	9.85%	6	0.23%	2,121	80.07%	2,649
Hood	1,318	88.75%	166	11.18%	1	0.07%	1,152	77.58%	1,485
Hopkins	4,955	89.91%	551	10.00%	5	0.09%	4,404	79.91%	5,511
Houston	3,579	88.24%	474	11.69%	3	0.07%	3,105	76.55%	4,056
Howard	4,329	92.05%	367	7.80%	7	0.15%	3,962	84.24%	4,703
Hudspeth	426	88.57%	54	11.23%	1	0.21%	372	77.34%	481
Hunt	8,156	90.18%	877	9.70%	11	0.12%	7,279	80.48%	9,044
Hutchinson	3,019	73.12%	1,101	26.67%	9	0.22%	1,918	46.45%	4,129
Irion	560	87.91%	74	11.62%	3	0.47%	486	76.30%	637
Jack	2,046	86.99%	305	12.97%	1	0.04%	1,741	74.02%	2,352
Jackson	1,506	83.48%	296	16.41%	2	0.11%	1,210	67.07%	1,804
Jasper	2,236	91.04%	220	8.96%	0	0.00%	2,016	82.08%	2,456
Jeff Davis	374	88.21%	50	11.79%	0	0.00%	324	76.42%	424
Jefferson	19,694	80.09%	4,860	19.76%	37	0.15%	14,834	60.32%	24,591
Jim Hogg	810	89.01%	100	10.99%	0	0.00%	710	78.02%	910
Jim Wells	2,105	69.56%	914	30.20%	7	0.23%	1,191	39.36%	3,026
Johnson	5,532	89.47%	649	10.50%	2	0.03%	4,883	78.97%	6,183
Jones	3,688	90.08%	401	9.79%	5	0.12%	3,287	80.29%	4,094
Karnes	2,010	76.08%	631	23.88%	1	0.04%	1,379	52.20%	2,642
Kaufman	5,232	90.98%	516	8.97%	3	0.05%	4,716	82.00%	5,751
Kendall	421	24.14%	1,321	75.75%	2	0.11%	-900	-51.61%	1,744
Kenedy	38	35.85%	68	64.15%	0	0.00%	-30	-28.30%	106
Kent	712	89.90%	79	9.97%	1	0.13%	633	79.92%	792
Kerr	1,634	59.29%	1,112	40.35%	10	0.36%	522	18.94%	2,756
Kimble	1,117	83.61%	219	16.39%	0	0.00%	898	67.22%	1,336
King	266	92.04%	23	7.96%	0	0.00%	243	84.08%	289
Kinney	418	72.44%	156	27.04%	3	0.52%	262	45.41%	577
Kleberg	1,631	79.02%	429	20.78%	4	0.19%	1,202	58.24%	2,064
Knox	1,699	87.04%	253	12.96%	0	0.00%	1,446	74.08%	1,952
Lamar	8,038	91.29%	761	8.64%	6	0.07%	7,277	82.65%	8,805
Lamb	3,259	86.15%	513	13.56%	11	0.29%	2,746	72.59%	3,783
Lampasas	2,006	89.12%	244	10.84%	1	0.04%	1,762	78.28%	2,251
La Salle	706	86.31%	112	13.69%	0	0.00%	594	72.62%	818
Lavaca	2,419	63.06%	1,412	36.81%	5	0.13%	1,007	26.25%	3,836
Lee	954	45.30%	1,150	54.61%	2	0.09%	-196	-9.31%	2,106
Leon	2,349	90.31%	252	9.69%	0	0.00%	2,097	80.62%	2,601
Liberty	3,458	87.19%	497	12.53%	11	0.28%	2,961	74.66%	3,966
Limestone	4,784	89.50%	559	10.46%	2	0.04%	4,225	79.05%	5,345
Lipscomb	774	62.88%	445	36.15%	12	0.97%	329	26.73%	1,231
Live Oak	888	63.88%	499	35.90%	3	0.22%	389	27.99%	1,390
Llano	1,484	85.93%	238	13.78%	5	0.29%	1,246	72.15%	1,727
Loving	98	82.35%	21	17.65%	0	0.00%	77	64.71%	119
Lubbock	8,113	86.19%	1,283	13.63%	17	0.18%	6,830	72.56%	9,413
Lynn	2,618	90.97%	255	8.86%	5	0.17%	2,363	82.11%	2,878
McCulloch	2,373	84.27%	443	15.73%	0	0.00%	1,930	68.54%	2,816
McLennan	15,952	87.82%	2,178	11.99%	35	0.19%	13,774	75.83%	18,165
McMullen	336	81.36%	77	18.64%	0	0.00%	259	62.71%	413
Madison	1,434	91.86%	127	8.14%	0	0.00%	1,307	83.73%	1,561
Marion	1,253	88.24%	167	11.76%	0	0.00%	1,086	76.48%	1,420
Martin	1,044	88.40%	136	11.52%	1	0.08%	908	76.88%	1,181
Mason	1,065	62.57%	634	37.25%	3	0.18%	431	25.32%	1,702
Matagorda	2,156	76.64%	651	23.14%	6	0.21%	1,505	53.50%	2,813
Maverick	875	83.73%	166	15.89%	4	0.38%	709	67.85%	1,045
Medina	1,749	54.17%	1,480	45.83%	0	0.00%	269	8.33%	3,229
Menard	1,153	82.36%	246	17.57%	1	0.07%	907	64.79%	1,400
Midland	1,921	74.75%	646	25.14%	3	0.12%	1,275	49.61%	2,570
Milam	4,083	78.38%	1,110	21.31%	16	0.31%	2,973	57.07%	5,209
Mills	1,658	85.20%	287	14.75%	1	0.05%	1,371	70.45%	1,946
Mitchell	2,401	90.37%	251	9.45%	5	0.19%	2,150	80.92%	2,657
Montague	3,352	86.21%	530	13.63%	6	0.15%	2,822	72.58%	3,888
Montgomery	3,347	89.13%	408	10.87%	0	0.00%	2,939	78.27%	3,755
Moore	959	80.66%	224	18.84%	6	0.50%	735	61.82%	1,189
Morris	1,752	95.53%	82	4.47%	0	0.00%	1,670	91.06%	1,834
Motley	907	90.07%	100	9.93%	0	0.00%	807	80.14%	1,007
Nacogdoches	4,988	91.83%	440	8.10%	4	0.07%	4,548	83.73%	5,432
Navarro	7,683	91.30%	721	8.57%	11	0.13%	6,962	82.73%	8,415
Newton	1,940	91.68%	174	8.22%	2	0.09%	1,766	83.46%	2,116
Nolan	3,314	87.35%	471	12.41%	9	0.24%	2,843	74.93%	3,794
Nueces	9,740	75.84%	3,065	23.87%	37	0.29%	6,675	51.98%	12,842
Ochiltree	1,213	80.49%	294	19.51%	0	0.00%	919	60.98%	1,507
Oldham	416	83.37%	82	16.43%	1	0.20%	334	66.93%	499
Orange	3,011	89.19%	358	10.60%	7	0.21%	2,653	78.58%	3,376
Palo Pinto	2,571	83.20%	510	16.50%	9	0.29%	2,061	66.70%	3,090
Panola	2,871	94.07%	179	5.87%	2	0.07%	2,692	88.20%	3,052
Parker	3,687	86.69%	558	13.12%	8	0.19%	3,129	73.57%	4,253
Parmer	1,062	74.01%	370	25.78%	3	0.21%	692	48.22%	1,435
Pecos	1,583	82.23%	332	17.25%	10	0.52%	1,251	64.99%	1,925
Polk	2,642	90.42%	280	9.58%	0	0.00%	2,362	80.84%	2,922
Potter	7,203	75.71%	2,285	24.02%	26	0.27%	4,918	51.69%	9,514
Presidio	917	84.59%	163	15.04%	4	0.37%	754	69.56%	1,084
Rains	1,080	81.02%	251	18.83%	2	0.15%	829	62.19%	1,333
Randall	1,779	82.28%	382	17.67%	1	0.05%	1,397	64.62%	2,162
Reagan	520	85.39%	88	14.45%	1	0.16%	432	70.94%	609
Real	453	78.24%	126	21.76%	0	0.00%	327	56.48%	579
Red River	3,899	87.46%	555	12.45%	4	0.09%	3,344	75.01%	4,458
Reeves	1,305	83.98%	247	15.89%	2	0.13%	1,058	68.08%	1,554
Refugio	1,487	76.18%	458	23.46%	7	0.36%	1,029	52.72%	1,952
Roberts	408	87.55%	55	11.80%	3	0.64%	353	75.75%	466
Robertson	3,191	94.80%	175	5.20%	0	0.00%	3,016	89.60%	3,366
Rockwall	1,510	94.08%	95	5.92%	0	0.00%	1,415	88.16%	1,605
Runnels	3,088	78.60%	835	21.25%	6	0.15%	2,253	57.34%	3,929
Rusk	7,901	91.73%	704	8.17%	8	0.09%	7,197	83.56%	8,613
Sabine	1,626	91.09%	157	8.80%	2	0.11%	1,469	82.30%	1,785
San Augustine	1,325	91.76%	119	8.24%	0	0.00%	1,206	83.52%	1,444
San Jacinto	764	86.43%	119	13.46%	1	0.11%	645	72.96%	884
San Patricio	2,963	74.77%	980	24.73%	20	0.50%	1,983	50.04%	3,963
San Saba	2,304	91.14%	221	8.74%	3	0.12%	2,083	82.40%	2,528
Schleicher	601	83.70%	117	16.30%	0	0.00%	484	67.41%	718
Scurry	2,303	89.16%	280	10.84%	0	0.00%	2,023	78.32%	2,583
Shackelford	1,521	86.77%	229	13.06%	3	0.17%	1,292	73.70%	1,753
Shelby	4,720	93.10%	349	6.88%	1	0.02%	4,371	86.21%	5,070
Sherman	528	86.13%	82	13.38%	3	0.49%	446	72.76%	613
Smith	9,410	85.74%	1,557	14.19%	8	0.07%	7,853	71.55%	10,975
Somervell	532	79.40%	138	20.60%	0	0.00%	394	58.81%	670
Starr	1,200	94.64%	68	5.36%	0	0.00%	1,132	89.27%	1,268
Stephens	2,750	85.32%	471	14.61%	2	0.06%	2,279	70.71%	3,223
Sterling	425	96.37%	16	3.63%	0	0.00%	409	92.74%	441
Stonewall	1,172	88.25%	156	11.75%	0	0.00%	1,016	76.51%	1,328
Sutton	571	86.91%	84	12.79%	2	0.30%	487	74.12%	657
Swisher	1,432	82.63%	298	17.20%	3	0.17%	1,134	65.44%	1,733
Tarrant	36,062	82.73%	7,474	17.15%	53	0.12%	28,588	65.59%	43,589
Taylor	7,852	88.72%	983	11.11%	15	0.17%	6,869	77.62%	8,850
Terrell	417	75.82%	133	24.18%	0	0.00%	284	51.64%	550
Terry	2,116	93.59%	145	6.41%	0	0.00%	1,971	87.17%	2,261
Throckmorton	995	87.82%	138	12.18%	0	0.00%	857	75.64%	1,133
Titus	3,686	93.53%	255	6.47%	0	0.00%	3,431	87.06%	3,941
Tom Green	6,433	85.81%	1,049	13.99%	15	0.20%	5,384	71.82%	7,497
Travis	17,300	84.38%	3,128	15.26%	75	0.37%	14,172	69.12%	20,503
Trinity	1,791	86.56%	274	13.24%	4	0.19%	1,517	73.32%	2,069
Tyler	1,326	85.22%	228	14.65%	2	0.13%	1,098	70.57%	1,556
Upshur	3,480	87.04%	518	12.96%	0	0.00%	2,962	74.09%	3,998
Upton	1,062	74.16%	370	25.84%	0	0.00%	692	48.32%	1,432
Uvalde	1,871	76.90%	556	22.85%	6	0.25%	1,315	54.05%	2,433
Val Verde	1,628	72.45%	616	27.41%	3	0.13%	1,012	45.04%	2,247
Van Zandt	4,975	87.05%	721	12.62%	19	0.33%	4,254	74.44%	5,715
Victoria	2,493	72.24%	956	27.70%	2	0.06%	1,537	44.54%	3,451
Walker	2,158	90.82%	218	9.18%	0	0.00%	1,940	81.65%	2,376
Waller	1,065	77.96%	300	21.96%	1	0.07%	765	56.00%	1,366
Ward	1,931	86.71%	281	12.62%	15	0.67%	1,650	74.09%	2,227
Washington	1,449	43.68%	1,868	56.32%	0	0.00%	-419	-12.63%	3,317
Webb	4,147	84.19%	775	15.73%	4	0.08%	3,372	68.45%	4,926
Wharton	3,976	83.88%	760	16.03%	4	0.08%	3,216	67.85%	4,740
Wheeler	2,600	83.23%	517	16.55%	7	0.22%	2,083	66.68%	3,124
Wichita	11,672	84.05%	2,206	15.89%	9	0.06%	9,466	68.16%	13,887
Wilbarger	3,249	82.21%	697	17.64%	6	0.15%	2,552	64.57%	3,952
Willacy	1,173	61.09%	740	38.54%	7	0.36%	433	22.55%	1,920
Williamson	5,944	77.49%	1,714	22.34%	13	0.17%	4,230	55.14%	7,671
Wilson	2,750	81.87%	605	18.01%	4	0.12%	2,145	63.86%	3,359
Winkler	1,340	88.62%	172	11.38%	0	0.00%	1,168	77.25%	1,512
Wise	3,751	88.24%	498	11.71%	2	0.05%	3,253	76.52%	4,251
Wood	3,659	86.11%	585	13.77%	5	0.12%	3,074	72.35%	4,249
Yoakum	885	86.85%	134	13.15%	0	0.00%	751	73.70%	1,019
Young	3,712	88.49%	478	11.39%	5	0.12%	3,234	77.09%	4,195
Zapata	784	61.30%	495	38.70%	0	0.00%	289	22.60%	1,279
Zavala	739	74.05%	259	25.95%	0	0.00%	480	48.10%	998
Totals	909,974	80.93%	212,692	18.92%	1,771	0.16%	697,282	62.01%	1,124,437

==== Counties that flipped from Democratic to Republican ====
- Comal
- Guadalupe
- Lee
- Kenedy
- Washington

== See also ==
- United States presidential elections in Texas
