= Texon, Texas =

Unincorporated hamlet in Texas, US

Coordinates: 31°13′30″N 101°41′22″W

Reagan County, Texas

Texon is a small unincorporated town in Reagan County, Texas, United States, in the western part of the state. The town is noted for its boom as an oil town and subsequent near abandonment.

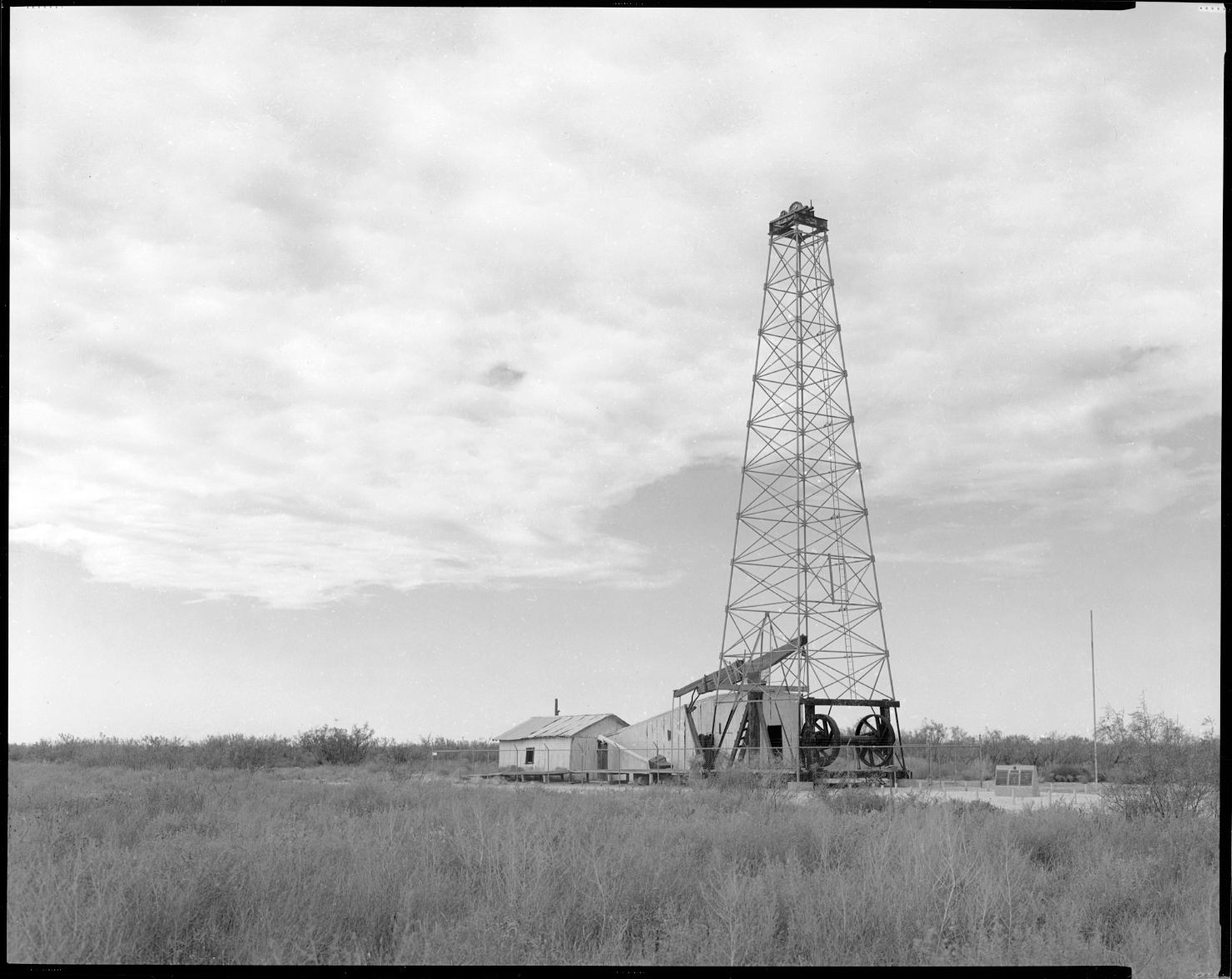
Oil derrick, Texon, Texas

== Population and location ==
The population in 1996 was estimated at less than 10. At its peak in 1933, the town had approximately 1,200 inhabitants. The town is located in Reagan County. It is 3/10 mile (0.5 km) south of U.S. Route 67 on RM 1675. It is 85 miles west of San Angelo, Texas. Texon was served by the Kansas City, Mexico and Orient Railway.

== History ==
The town originates from May 28, 1923, when oil was discovered. The town was named for the Texon Oil and Land Company, which drilled the first successful oil well in the Permian Basin, the Santa Rita. On December 4, 1928, under the supervision of Carl G. Cromwell, Texon Oil discovered the Santa Rita University 1-B, at that time the world's deepest well at 8,525 feet. Texon Oil and Land Company developed the Santa Rita oil field. Texon's leases were subsequently purchased by M. L. "Mike" Benedum and Joe Trees of Pittsburgh, who formed the Big Lake Oil Company.

Ownership passed on to successive oil companies, including Plymouth Oil Company (in 1956) and Ohio Oil (now Marathon Oil) in 1962, which chose not to maintain the town that had at that time 100 residents. In 1986, the post office was closed.

In the 1920s, wastewater from oil extraction was released onto the ground, which caused extreme damage to vegetation and soil, to the point that the resulting scar can still be seen on satellite images. Cleanup is still ongoing.

== Limited redevelopment ==
Historical markers have been installed in the town, as have new reflective type street signs and new mailboxes. Also, some activity is occurring in some of the oil wells.
