= Upland, Texas =

- Ghost town
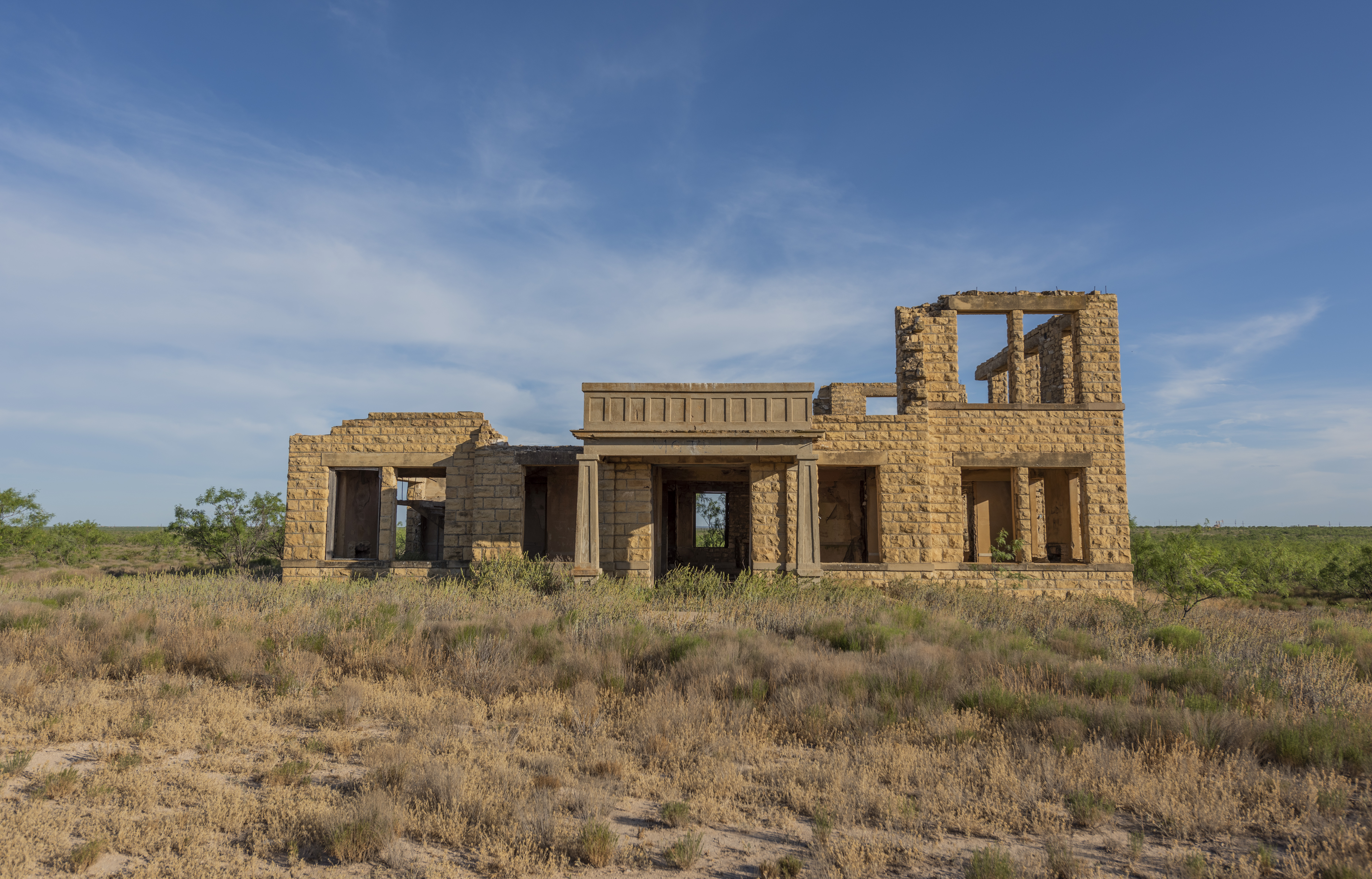
- Abandoned Upton County Courthouse at Upland

- Location of Upland in Texas Upland, Texas (the United States)
- Coordinates: 31°21′59″N 101°58′50″W
- Country: United States
- State: Texas
- County: Upton
- Physiographic region: West Texas
- Founded: 1908
- Elevation: 2,688 ft (819 m)

Population (2000)
  - Total: 0
- Time zone: UTC-6 (Central (CST))
  - Summer (DST): UTC-5 (CDT)
- Area code: 325
- Website: Handbook of Texas

Upland is a ghost town in Upton County, Texas, United States, about 10 mi (16 km) north of Rankin.

== See also ==
- List of ghost towns in Texas
- Llano Estacado
