= Reagan County Independent School District =

School district in Texas

Reagan County Independent School District is a public school district based in Big Lake, Texas (USA). The district's boundaries parallel that of Reagan County.

In 2009, the school district was rated "academically acceptable" by the Texas Education Agency.

== Schools ==
- Reagan County High (Grades 9-12)
- Reagan County Middle (Grades 6-8)
- Reagan County Elementary (Grades PK-5)
