= Upton County, Texas =

County in Texas, United States

- County
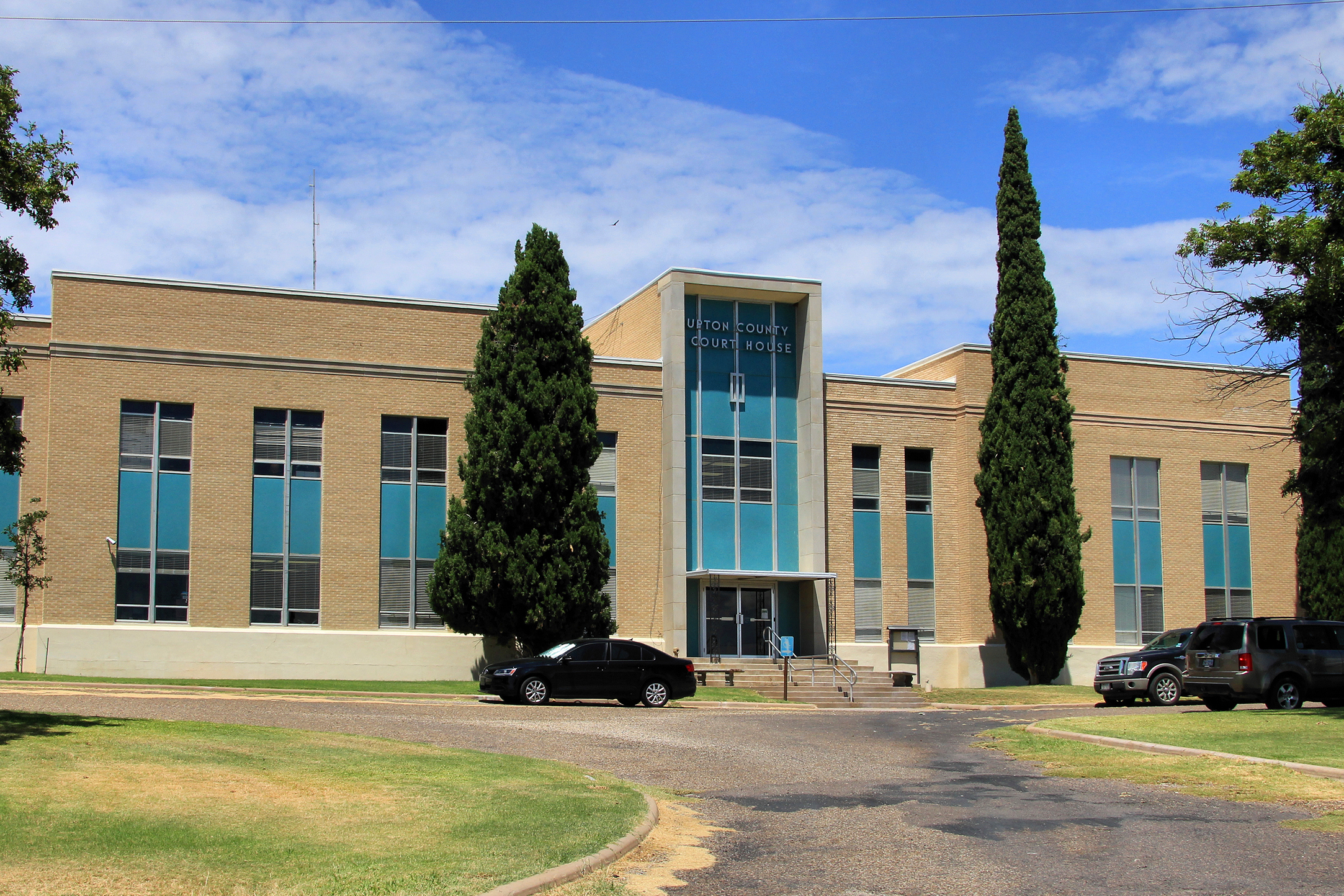
- The Upton County Courthouse in Rankin

- Location within the U.S. state of Texas
- Coordinates: 31°22′N 102°02′W
- Country: United States
- State: Texas
- Founded: 1910
- Seat: Rankin
- Largest city: McCamey

Area
  - Total: 1,242 sq mi (3,220 km^{2})
  - Land: 1,241 sq mi (3,210 km^{2})
  - Water: 0.2 sq mi (0.52 km^{2}) 0.01%

Population (2020)
  - Total: 3,308
  - Estimate (2025): 3,131 ▼
  - Density: 2.666/sq mi (1.029/km^{2})
- Time zone: UTC−6 (Central)
  - Summer (DST): UTC−5 (CDT)
- Congressional district: 23rd
- Website: www.co.upton.tx.us

Upton County is a county located on the Edwards Plateau in the U.S. state of Texas. As of the 2020 census, its population was 3,308. Its county seat is Rankin. The county was created in 1887 and later organized in 1910. It is named for two brothers: John C. and William F. Upton, both colonels in the Confederate Army.

== History ==
=== Native Americans ===
Native Americans were the first inhabitants of the area. Tribes present at the time of conquest included the Comanches and Apache.

=== Trails ===
One of the first routes bringing people through the area was the Chihuahua Trail connecting Mexico's state of Chihuahua with Santa Fe, New Mexico. The trail served as a trade route for nomadic tribes of Indians and Spaniards, as well as traders from both Mexico and Texas.

The Butterfield Overland Mail crossed the area from 1858 to 1861.

The Goodnight-Loving Trail served as a cattle-drive trail from 1866 to 1888. The trail began at Young County, Texas, and passed along the Pecos River to Fort Sumner, New Mexico, and into Colorado before ending in Cheyenne, Wyoming.

=== Establishment of the county ===
Upton was formed in 1887 from Tom Green County, Texas. The county was named after John C. Upton and his brother William F. Upton. of Tennessee. Cattleman George Elliott became the first to establish a homestead in Upton County in 1880. Beginning as open range, the land was shared with sheepmen by the 1890s. The United States Census counted 52 people living in the county in 1890, and only 48 in 1900; most of these were either members of three families, or were in their employ. The agricultural sector of the county has been outpaced by cattle and sheep ranching. In 1982, about 92% of the land in Upton County was in farms and ranches, but less than 1% of the county was considered prime farmland, and only 2% of the county was cultivated. In the fall of 1911, the Kansas City, Mexico and Orient Railway reached the townsite of Rankin, and by January 1912, most of the people living in Upland had moved to Rankin.

=== Oil ===
Wildcatter George McCamey's Baker No. 1 in September 1925 opened up the McCamey Oil Field, established the town of McCamey and brought the subsequent oil boom to Upton County. The Yates Oil Field in Crockett and Pecos Counties resulted in a financial boon for the town of Rankin, which served as a supply and service center. The resulting financial windfall benefitted infrastructure in Rankin. In 1946, Mike Benedum began wildcatting in Upton County and opened up what would become known as the Benedum Oil Field. The Weir No. 1 gushed in 1961 and enabled Upton County to continue as an outstanding Texas production area.

== Geography ==
According to the U.S. Census Bureau, the county has a total area of 1,242 square miles (3,220 km^{2}), of which 0.2 sq mi (0.52 km^{2}) (0.01%) is covered by water. The Spraberry Trend, the third-largest oil field in the United States by remaining reserves, underlies much of the county. Bobcat Hills, a summit with an elevation of 2,697 ft (822 m), is found in Upton County.

=== Major highways ===
- U.S. Highway 67
- U.S. Highway 385
- State Highway 329
- State Highway 349
- Spur 576

=== Adjacent counties ===
- Midland County (north)
- Reagan County (east)
- Crockett County (south)
- Crane County (west)
- Ector County (northwest)

== Demographics ==
Historical population
Census	Pop.	Note	%±
1890	52		—
1900	48		−7.7%
1910	501		943.8%
1920	253		−49.5%
1930	5,968		2,258.9%
1940	4,297		−28.0%
1950	5,307		23.5%
1960	6,239		17.6%
1970	4,697		−24.7%
1980	4,619		−1.7%
1990	4,447		−3.7%
2000	3,404		−23.5%
2010	3,355		−1.4%
2020	3,308		−1.4%
2025 (est.)	3,131	▼	−5.4%
U.S. Decennial Census; 1850–2010 2010 2020

=== Racial and ethnic composition ===
Upton County, Texas – Racial and ethnic composition Note: the US Census treats Hispanic/Latino as an ethnic category. This table excludes Latinos from the racial categories and assigns them to a separate category. Hispanics/Latinos may be of any race.
Race / Ethnicity (NH = Non-Hispanic)	Pop 1980	Pop 1990	Pop 2000	Pop 2010	Pop 2020	% 1980	% 1990	% 2000	% 2010	% 2020
White alone (NH)	3,226	2,666	1,854	1,611	1,318	69.84%	59.95%	54.47%	48.02%	39.84%
Black or African American alone (NH)	86	88	52	49	59	1.86%	1.98%	1.53%	1.46%	1.78%
Native American or Alaska Native alone (NH)	8	19	28	28	11	0.17%	0.43%	0.82%	0.83%	0.33%
Asian alone (NH)	0	2	0	0	4	0.00%	0.04%	0.00%	0.00%	0.12%
Native Hawaiian or Pacific Islander alone (NH)	x	x	2	0	0	x	x	0.06%	0.00%	0.00%
Other race alone (NH)	4	6	0	4	3	0.09%	0.13%	0.00%	0.12%	0.09%
Mixed race or Multiracial (NH)	x	x	19	19	116	x	x	0.56%	0.57%	3.51%
Hispanic or Latino (any race)	1,295	1,666	1,449	1,644	1,797	28.04%	37.46%	42.57%	49.00%	54.32%
Total	4,619	4,447	3,404	3,355	3,308	100.00%	100.00%	100.00%	100.00%	100.00%

=== 2020 census ===
As of the 2020 census, the county had a population of 3,308. The median age was 38.6 years; 26.3% of residents were under the age of 18 and 16.3% were 65 years of age or older. For every 100 females there were 103.3 males, and for every 100 females age 18 and over there were 106.6 males age 18 and over.

The racial makeup of the county was 55.9% White, 2.2% Black or African American, 0.4% American Indian and Alaska Native, 0.2% Asian, <0.1% Native Hawaiian and Pacific Islander, 11.5% from some other race, and 29.8% from two or more races. Hispanic or Latino residents of any race comprised 54.3% of the population.

Less than 0.1% of residents lived in urban areas, while 100.0% lived in rural areas.

There were 1,222 households in the county, of which 39.5% had children under the age of 18 living in them. Of all households, 50.0% were married-couple households, 22.6% were households with a male householder and no spouse or partner present, and 22.2% were households with a female householder and no spouse or partner present. About 25.1% of all households were made up of individuals and 12.2% had someone living alone who was 65 years of age or older.

There were 1,523 housing units, of which 19.8% were vacant. Among occupied housing units, 75.0% were owner-occupied and 25.0% were renter-occupied. The homeowner vacancy rate was 2.3% and the rental vacancy rate was 17.1%.

=== 2000 census ===
As of the 2000 census, 3,404 people, 1,256 households, and 934 families were residing in the county. The population density was 3 people per square mile (1.2 people/km^{2}). The 1,609 housing units averaged 1 units per square mile (0.39 units/km^{2}). The racial makeup of the county was 77.79% White, 1.62% African American, 1.20% Native American, 0.03% Asian, 0.06% Pacific Islander, 17.95% from other races, and 1.35% from two or more races. About 42.57% of the population was Hispanic or Latino of any race.

Of the 1,256 households, 36.30% had children under the age of 18 living with them, 61.10% were married couples living together, 9.10% had a female householder with no husband present, and 25.60% were not families. Around 23.50% of all households were made up of individuals, and 12.20% had someone living alone who was 65 years of age or older. The average household size was 2.68, and the average family size was 3.19.

In the county, the age distribution was 29.30% under 18, 7.90% from 18 to 24, 24.90% from 25 to 44, 23.80% from 45 to 64, and 14.20% who were 65 or older. The median age was 38 years. For every 100 females there were 95.90 males. For every 100 females age 18 and over, there were 93.30 males.

The median income for a household in the county was $28,977, and for a family was $37,083. Males had a median income of $30,729 versus $18,750 for females. The per capita income for the county was $14,274. About 18.10% of families and 19.90% of the population were below the poverty line, including 26.60% of those under age 18 and 13.50% of those age 65 or over.

== Communities ==
=== Cities ===
- McCamey
- Rankin (county seat)

=== Unincorporated community ===
- Midkiff

=== Ghost towns ===
- Upland

== Politics ==
United States presidential election results for Upton County, Texas
Year	Republican		Democratic		Third party(ies)	
Year	No.	%	No.	%	No.	%
1912	2	5.71%	28	80.00%	5	14.29%
1916	6	12.24%	42	85.71%	1	2.04%
1920	25	35.21%	46	64.79%	0	0.00%
1924	4	10.00%	35	87.50%	1	2.50%
1928	270	58.82%	189	41.18%	0	0.00%
1932	92	8.29%	1,012	91.17%	6	0.54%
1936	81	9.96%	728	89.54%	4	0.49%
1940	370	25.84%	1,062	74.16%	0	0.00%
1944	105	11.48%	742	81.09%	68	7.43%
1948	155	15.14%	811	79.20%	58	5.66%
1952	940	52.43%	850	47.41%	3	0.17%
1956	999	54.29%	834	45.33%	7	0.38%
1960	798	45.34%	930	52.84%	32	1.82%
1964	636	39.65%	958	59.73%	10	0.62%
1968	664	41.87%	463	29.19%	459	28.94%
1972	1,186	81.07%	256	17.50%	21	1.44%
1976	869	55.67%	686	43.95%	6	0.38%
1980	1,169	69.42%	485	28.80%	30	1.78%
1984	1,603	80.39%	380	19.06%	11	0.55%
1988	1,189	68.33%	544	31.26%	7	0.40%
1992	908	51.71%	489	27.85%	359	20.44%
1996	685	56.89%	424	35.22%	95	7.89%
2000	982	77.14%	266	20.90%	25	1.96%
2004	1,009	84.29%	185	15.46%	3	0.25%
2008	898	75.02%	288	24.06%	11	0.92%
2012	953	73.31%	333	25.62%	14	1.08%
2016	1,007	74.76%	286	21.23%	54	4.01%
2020	1,178	86.11%	170	12.43%	20	1.46%
2024	1,149	88.18%	146	11.20%	8	0.61%

United States Senate election results for Upton County, Texas1
Year	Republican		Democratic		Third party(ies)	
Year	No.	%	No.	%	No.	%
2024	1,069	84.51%	164	12.96%	32	2.53%

United States Senate election results for Upton County, Texas2
Year	Republican		Democratic		Third party(ies)	
Year	No.	%	No.	%	No.	%
2020	1,147	85.85%	160	11.98%	29	2.17%

Texas Gubernatorial election results for Upton County
Year	Republican		Democratic		Third party(ies)	
Year	No.	%	No.	%	No.	%
2022	908	85.82%	124	11.72%	26	2.46%

== Education ==
Two school districts serve sections of the county:

- Grandfalls-Royalty Independent School District
- Monahans-Wickett-Pyote Independent School District
- Pecos-Barstow-Toyah Independent School District

All of the county is in the service area of Odessa College.

== See also ==
- Recorded Texas Historic Landmarks in Upton County
