= Haymon Krupp =

Haymon Krupp, a Jewish Texan merchant and member of the Texas wildcatters, was born in Lithuania on March 14, 1874. In 1890 he immigrated to El Paso, Texas, where he worked in a dry-goods store and soon opened his own men's clothing store. He pioneered what is now El Paso's outdoor clothing industry with one of the first clothing factories in the Southwest. Krupp joined Frank Pickrell, also of El Paso, to buy a lease option to drill for oil on University of Texas lands in the Permian Basin. In 1919 Krupp and Pickrell organized the Texon Oil and Land Company (Texon, Texas), with Krupp as president and Pickrell as vice president.
