= Spraberry Trend =

Large oil field in the Permian Basin of West Texas

Coordinates: 31.7416°N 101.8744°W

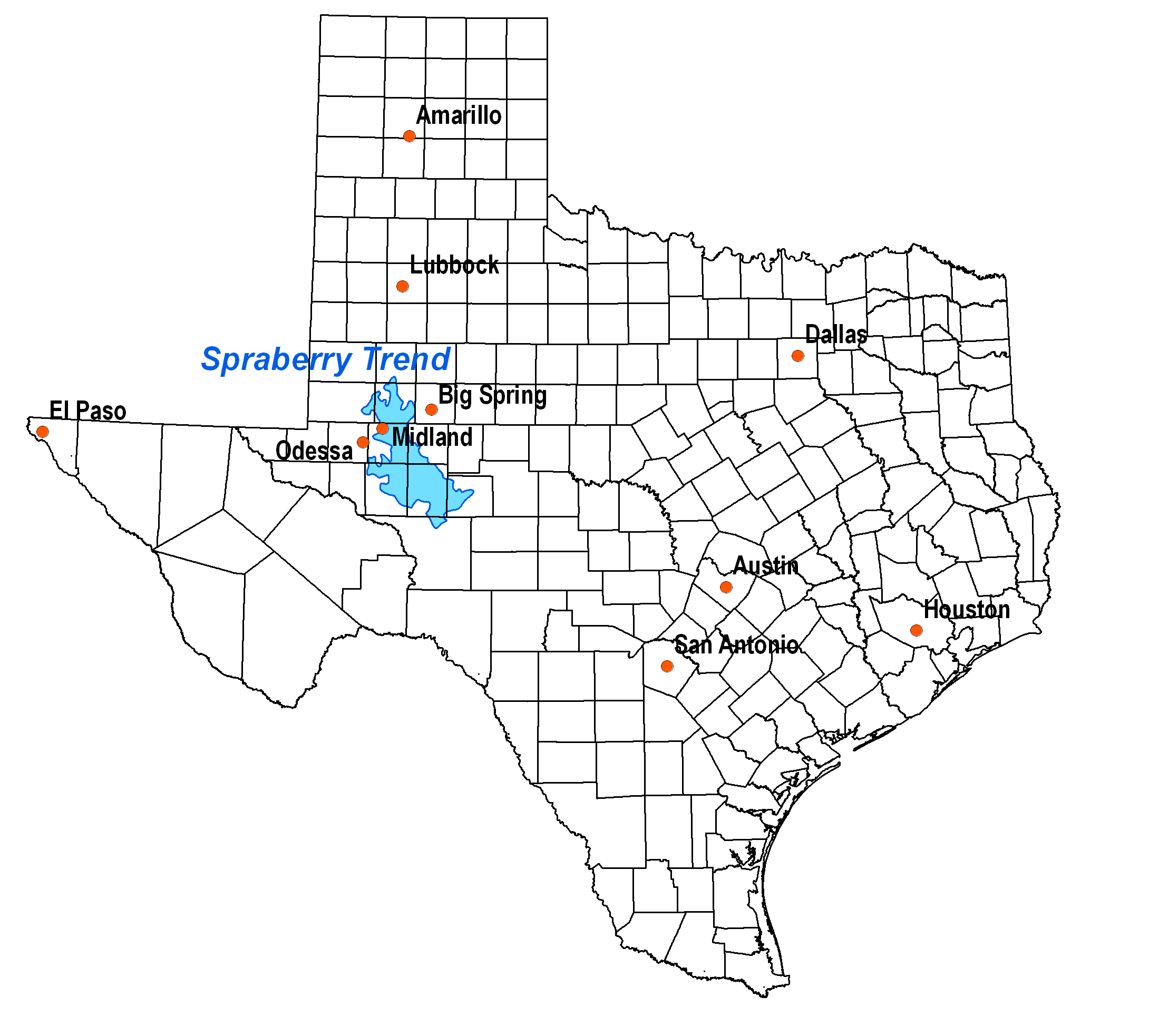
Location of the Spraberry Trend in Texas, showing major and nearby cities. Black lines are county boundaries.

The Spraberry Trend (also known as the Spraberry Field, Spraberry Oil Field, and Spraberry Formation; sometimes erroneously written as Sprayberry) is a large oil field in the Permian Basin of West Texas, covering large parts of six counties, and having a total area of approximately 2,500 square miles (6,500 km^{2}). It is named for Abner Spraberry, the Dawson County farmer who owned the land containing the 1943 discovery well. The Spraberry Trend is itself part of a larger oil-producing region known as the Spraberry-Dean Play, within the Midland Basin. Discovery and development of the field began the postwar economic boom in the nearby city of Midland in the early 1950s. The oil in the Spraberry, however, proved difficult to recover. After about three years of enthusiastic drilling, during which most of the initially promising wells showed precipitous and mysterious production declines, the area was dubbed "the world's largest unrecoverable oil reserve."

In 2007, the U.S. Department of Energy ranked The Spraberry Trend third in the United States by total proved reserves, and seventh in total production. Estimated reserves for the entire Spraberry-Dean unit exceeded 10 billion barrels (1.6×10^{9} m^{3}), and by the end of 1994, the field had reported a total production of 924 million barrels (146,900,000 m^{3}).

== Setting ==
The Spraberry Trend covers a large area – around 2,500 square miles (6,500 km^{2}) – and includes portions of two Texas geographical regions, the Llano Estacado and the Edwards Plateau. As most often defined, the Spraberry includes portions of Irion, Reagan, Upton, Glasscock, Midland, and Martin Counties, although the underlying geologic unit also touches Dawson, Crockett, and Andrews Counties. Elevations are generally between 2,500 and 3,000 feet (910 m) above sea level, and the terrain varies from flat to rolling, with occasional canyons, known locally as "draws", cutting through the plateau. Drainage is to the east, via the Concho River to the Colorado River. The climate is semi-arid. Native vegetation includes scrub and grasslands, with trees such as cottonwoods along the watercourses.

Aside from activities associated with oil production, transport, and storage, predominant land use in the area includes ranching and farming.

== Geology ==
All of the Spraberry Trend oil fields produce from a single enormous sedimentary unit known as the Spraberry Sand, which consists of complexly mixed fine sandstone and calcareous or silicate mudstone and siltstone, deposited in a deep water environment distinguished by channel systems and their associated submarine fans, all of Permian age. The sands are interbedded with shales, and typically pinch-out updip. Oil accumulated in stratigraphic traps as it migrated upward from source rocks until encountering impermeable barriers, either in the internal shaly members or the overlying impermeable formation. Unlike many of the oil-bearing rocks of West Texas, however, the very low porosity and permeability hamper economic oil recovery. The rocks are naturally fractured, further complicating hydrocarbon flow.

Shaly rocks make up 87% of the Spraberry, with the oil-bearing sands and siltstones present sometimes in thin layers between them. The best-producing zone is at an average depth of 6,800 feet (2,100 m) across the entire region, which is about 150 miles (240 km) long by 70 wide.

== History ==
The first well drilled into the formation was by Seaboard Oil Company in 1943, on land owned by farmer Abner Spraberry in Dawson County. While the well bore showed an oil-bearing unit had been found, and hence received Spraberry's name, it did not produce commercial quantities of oil. That changed in 1949, when the same company drilled well Lee 2-D, which produced 319 barrels per day (50.7 m^{3}/d) – hardly a spectacular discovery, but enough to pique the interest of numerous independent operators looking for opportunity around Midland. In 1950 and 1951, several other independent oil companies drilled productive wells separated by great distances, establishing that the formation was at least 150 miles (240 km) long, and beginning a frenzy of drilling in the region surrounding Midland.

Unfortunately for most of the speculators, investors, and outside independent oil companies, most of the newly drilled wells behaved badly; they produced oil nicely for a short time, and then production fell off sharply, with wells often failing to break even. In 1950, the cost of drilling and putting down 8,000 feet (2,400 m) of steel casing required a well to produce 50,000 barrels (7,900 m^{3}) just to break even in the face of the low federally mandated price of $2.58/barrel. Local companies that had been skeptical of the Spraberry since the beginning of the boom did not suffer the losses of the outsiders who had come in expecting to profit in the huge oil play. Even the professional geologists could not agree on what was wrong: in October, 1951, a convention in Midland of hundreds of engineers and petroleum geologists reached no consensus on the issues with the field, although the peculiar and irregularly fractured nature of the oil-bearing rocks seemed to be a large part of the problem. In May 1952, there were more than 1,630 Spraberry wells in the Midland basin, most recently drilled, but local enthusiasm had ended. In the following years, each operator developed its own methods of dealing with the unusual reservoir, and began to employ a technique known as "hydrofracturing" – forcing water down wells at extreme pressure, causing the rocks to fracture further, resulting in increased oil flow. This was moderately successful, and development of the Spraberry continued, albeit with greatly diminished expectations for massive output. Yet another method of fracturing the rocks to increase production was to pump a mixture of soap and kerosene, followed by a coarse-grained sand, also under intense pressure.

During the initial boom period the Spraberry promoters carried out an aggressive campaign to bring in outside investment, making exorbitant claims of the potential easy profit with the vast reserves of oil. As every well drilled into the Spraberry Sands anywhere in the Midland Basin found oil, at least initially, it seemed at first that their claims were not completely without merit. Yet their tactics were not subtle: one group of promoters from Los Angeles brought in a group of Hollywood models, and had these women photographed on the drilling rigs, working the equipment in the nude.

Using the normal 40-acre (160,000 m^{2}) spacing employed elsewhere in West Texas proved impossible on the Spraberry; wells that close competed against each other, as yields per-acre from the difficult reservoir were dropping into the hundreds of barrels rather than the expected thousands. Oil companies resorted to the unusual step of asking the Railroad Commission of Texas, the regulatory body which decided on well spacing and production quota, to require 80-acre (320,000 m^{2}), and then even 160-acre (0.65 km^{2}) spacing to allow each drilling site to be profitable. Many of the initial wells were abandoned in the next few years as they ran out of oil; modern enhanced recovery techniques, such as carbon dioxide injection, were not yet available.

For a period in the 1950s the abundant natural gas in the reservoir was simply flared off – burned above the wellhead – since no recovery infrastructure existed. Steel was expensive, transport costs high, and profit margins from the field were too low to allow the development of the sort of gas pipelines that exist in most modern oil fields. Aircraft pilots reported that hundreds of square miles of west Texas were lit at night from the fires of thousands of gas flares, and the people in Midland reported seeing what appeared to be a false sunrise in the east shortly after each sunset. In 1953 the Railroad Commission prohibited the wasteful practice, shutting down all wells in the field until a recovery system could be built. After a series of lawsuits and court battles, the Railroad Commission backed down, compromising with the operators by allowing them a set number of days per month during which they could pump oil and flare gas. The overall gas reserves of the field were estimated to be over two trillion cubic feet; during the peak of the early 1950s gas-flaring, over 220 million cubic feet (6,200,000 m^{3}) per day were burned.

The field grew in the 1960s with the annexation of several adjacent oil pools, and overall production increased with the implementation of enhanced recovery technologies, such as waterflooding. In the 1970s, as the price of oil went up, drilling and production proceeded; while Spraberry wells were never abundant producers, during periods of high prices they could provide dependable profits for oil companies, and the local economy entered its strongest period. In the 21st century, newer technologies such as carbon dioxide flooding have been used to increase production. Even with these advances, the Spraberry retains about 90% of its original calculated reserves, largely due to the difficulty of recovery. As of 2009, there were approximately 9,000 active wells in the Spraberry Trend.
