= Texas State Highway 137 =

State highway in Texas

State Highway 137
- SH 137, highlighted in red

Route information
- Maintained by TxDOT
- Length: 192.238 mi (309.377 km)
- Existed: 1928–present

Major junctions
- South end: SH 163 near Ozona
- US 190; I-20 in Stanton; US 62 / US 385 in Brownfield; US 82 / US 380 in Brownfield
- North end: US 385 near Brownfield

Location
- Country: United States
- State: Texas

Highway system
- Highways in Texas; Interstate; US; State; Former; Toll; Loops; Spurs; FM/RM; Park; Rec
← SH 136	→ SH 138

State Highway 137 (SH 137) is a state highway in west Texas. It runs 192.238 miles (309.377 km) from SH 163 near Ozona to U.S. Highway 385 (US 385) near Brownfield. SH 137 was originally established in 1928, and it has been realigned several times since then.

== History ==

SH 137 was designated on November 19, 1928 from Odessa to the Andrews–Gaines county line. On June 25, 1929, it was extended to McCamey. On March 19, 1930, a portion from Lubbock to Brownfield, which was designated as part of SH 53, was renumbered as a separate section of SH 137, creating a gap. On May 5, 1931, the southern section extended north to the Gaines–Terry county line, partially closing the gap. The sections were connected on May 28, 1932, closing the gap. On July 16, 1934, the route south of Meadow had become SH 51. On January 25, 1938, it was extended south to Brownfield as SH 51 was under construction on a road to the west the bypassed Meadow. On February 11, 1938, SH 137 was extended south to Lamesa, but this was to be cancelled when ROW was acquired. On May 24, 1938, the section south of the Terry County line was to be cancelled when surveys were complete. On September 20, 1938, the section from Brownfield to 2.5 miles north of Lamesa was restored. On October 25, 1938, the section from 2.5 miles north of Lamesa to Lamesa was restored, and SH 137 was extended further south from Lamesa to Rankin. On September 26, 1939, the section from Brownfield to Lubbock been reassigned to U.S. Highway 62. SH 137 had extended south to west of Sheffield, replacing SH 271. On August 20, 1940, the section of SH 137 from Midland to the Midland–Upton county line was cancelled, creating a gap. On October 22, 1940, the sections of SH 137 from Lamesa to Midland and from the Midland–Upton county line to Rankin were also cancelled, expanding the gap. On December 3, 1940, the section of SH 137 from Lamesa to Rankin was restored, closing the gap. On March 26, 1942, the section from Lamesa to Rankin was cancelled, with the section from Midland south 12 miles being transferred to FM 9, creating a gap. On April 29, 1942, the southern section of SH 137 from Rankin to Sheffield was transferred to SH 51, eliminating the gap. SH 137 was extended south to Stanton on August 23, 1943, replacing SH 303. On October 26, 1949, SH 137 was extended north from US 62 to SH 51. On December 1, 1953, SH 137 was signed, but not designated, along RM 1800 to SH 158. By 1969, SH 137 was signed along the rest of RM 1800, part of RM 33, and all of RM 865. On May 16, 1984, the route was officially designated along the signed 109 miles (175 km) extension, replacing all of RM 1800, part of RM 33, and all of RM 865.

== Junction list ==
County	Location	mi	km	Destinations	Notes
Crockett				SH 163 – Barnhart, Ozona	
Crockett				RM 1964 west	
Crockett				US 190 east – Eldorado	South end of US 190 overlap
Crockett				US 190 west – Iraan	North end of US 190 overlap
Reagan	Big Lake			US 67 – Rankin, San Angelo	
Reagan				RM 33 north – Big Spring	
Reagan				RM 1357 – Midland	
Glasscock				RM 2401 – Midkiff	
Glasscock				SH 158 – Midland, Garden City	
Midland				FM 307 – Midland	
Martin	Stanton			I-20 BL – Midland, Big Spring	
Martin	Stanton			I-20 – El Paso, Abilene	I-20 exit 156
Martin				SH 176 – Andrews, Big Spring	
Martin				FM 846 east – Knott	
Martin				FM 2002 east – Ackerly	South end of FM 2002 overlap
Martin				FM 2002 west	North end of FM 2002 overlap
Dawson				FM 828 – Patricia	
Dawson				FM 2052 west	
Dawson				SH 349 south – Midland	
Dawson	Lamesa			US 180 – Seminole, Gail	
Dawson	Lamesa			FM 2592 east to US 87	
Dawson				FM 1064 west	
Dawson				FM 1066 west	
Dawson	Welch			SH 83 west – Seagraves	
Dawson	Welch			FM 829 south	
Terry				FM 213	
Terry				FM 1076 east	
Terry	Brownfield			US 62 east / US 385 north – Lubbock	South end of US 62/385 overlap
Terry	Brownfield			US 62 west / US 385 south / FM 403 south – Seminole	North end of US 62/385 overlap
Terry	Brownfield			US 82 / US 380 – Plains, Tahoka	
Terry				US 385 – Levelland, Brownfield	
1.000 mi = 1.609 km; 1.000 km = 0.621 mi: Concurrency terminus
