= List of Harlequin Romance novels released in 1952 =

This is a list of Harlequin Romance novels released in 1952. (Main index: List of Harlequin Romance novels)

== Releases ==
Number	Title	Author	Date	Citations
# 148	Wagon Train Westward	Lynn Westland	1952	
# 149	Remembering Laughter	Wallace Stegner	1952	
# 150	Paprika	Erich von Stroheim	1952	
# 151	The Great I Am	Lewis Graham	1952	
# 152	Great Oaks	Ben Ames Williams	1952	
# 153	Outlaw Valley	Al Cody	1952	
# 154	Rasputin And Crimes That Shook The World	Richard Hirsch	1952	
# 155	Canyon Of The Damned	Tex Holt	1952	
# 156	Blood Of The North	James B. Hendryx	1952	
# 157	The Bizarre Sisters	Jay & Audrey Walz	1952	
# 158	Yucca City Outlaw	William Hopson	1952	
# 159	The Smiling Tiger	Lenore Glen Offord	1952	
# 160	Twelve Chinks And A Woman	James Hadley Chase	1952	
# 161	Health, Sex And Birth Control	Dr. Percy E. Ryberg	1952	
# 162	The River's End	James Oliver Curwood	1952	
# 163	Guntown	Dan Carew	1952	
# 164	Captain For Elizabeth	Jan Westcott	1952	
# 165	Bats With Baby Faces	W. Stanley Moss	1952	
# 166	The Big Fist	Clyde B. Ragsdale	1952	
# 167	Love Me And Die	Day Keene	1952	
# 168	Hunt The Killer	Day Keene	1952	
# 169	Lady Of Cleves	Margaret Campbell Barnes	1952	
# 170	The Sea Is So Wide	Evelyn Eaton	1952	
# 171	Savage Justice	Leslie Ernenwein	1952	
# 172	Gun Law	Paul Evan Lehman	1952	
# 173	Anna	Anneke De Lange	1952	
# 174	Murder Is My Racket	Robert H. Leitfred	1952	
# 175	The Commandos	Elliott Arnold	1952	
# 176	The Valley Of Silent Men	James Oliver Curwood	1952	
# 177	The House That Stood Still	A. E. Van Vogt	1952	
# 178	The Goldsmith's Wife	Jean Plaidy	1952	
# 179	Madame Serpent	Jean Plaidy	1952	
# 180	If The Coffin Fits	Day Keene	1952	
# 181	The Wicked Lady Skelton	Magdalen King-Hall	1952 (Note: republish of the 1949 edition)	
# 182	Crime On My Hands	Carl G. Hodges	1952	
# 183	Evening Street	Katrina Johnson	1952	
# 184	Black Jade	Angeline Taylor	1952	
# 185	Naked Fury	Day Keene	1952	
# 186	Why Be A Sucker?	D.M. Lebourdais	1952	
# 187	Shanghai Jezebel	Mark Corrigan	1952	
# 188	Beggars Might Ride	George Albert Glay	1952	
# 189	The Nymph And The Lamp	Thomas H. Raddall	1952	
# 190	Slave Ship	H.B. Drake	1952	
# 191	Prison Doctor	Louis Berg M.D	1952	
# 192	Swamp Willow	Edwina Elroy	1952	
# 193	The Firebrand	George Challis	1952	
# 194	Triggerman	Abel Shott	1952	
# 195	Nine To Five	Harvey Smith	1952	
# 196	His Majesty's Yankees	Thomas H. Raddall	1952	
# 197	Strictly For Cash	James Hadley Chase	1952	
# 198	Rawhider	C. N. Hecklemann	1952	
# 199	The Double Shuffle	James Hadley Chase	1952	
# 200	Doctor Of Lonesome River	Edison Marshall	1952	
# 201	The Unfulfilled	W.G. Hardy	1952	
# 202	Copper Town	Paul W. Fairman	1952	
# 203	Daughter Of Satan	Jean Plaidy	1952	
