= Krupp (disambiguation) =

Krupp can refer to:

- The Krupp family, owners of the German industrial conglomerate Friedrich Krupp AG Hoesch-Krupp, commonly known as Krupp
  - Thyssen-Krupp, successor company
  - Friedrich Krupp Germaniawerft, shipyard
  - Krupp Trial, post World War II war crimes trial involving the directors of the Krupp group
  - Lex Krupp, law concerning the succession of ownership of the Krupp group through the Krupp family line

Directors, owners and founders of the Krupp group
- Friedrich Krupp
- Alfried Krupp von Bohlen und Halbach
- Friedrich Alfred Krupp
- Bertha Krupp

- See also Category:Krupp

== Other uses ==
- Krupp, Washington, a town in the USA
- Die Krupps, German industrial rock band
- Krupp Diamond
- Krupp (surname), a German surname
- Mr. Benjamin Krupp, a character in the Captain Underpants series by Dav Pilkey

== See also ==
- Krups
