= Michael Late Benedum =

American businessman (1869–1959)

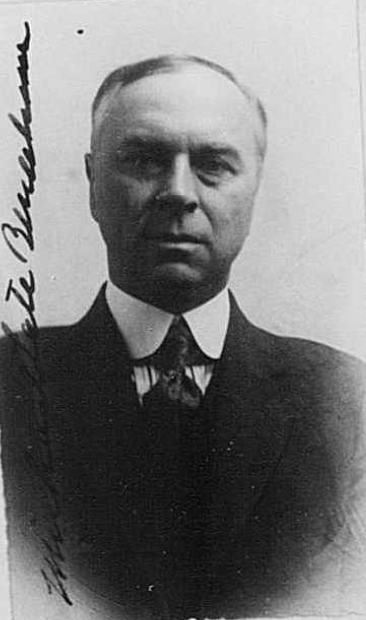
- Born: July 16, 1869; Bridgeport, West Virginia, US
- Died: July 30, 1959 (aged 90); Pittsburgh, Pennsylvania
- Resting place: Homewood Cemetery in Pittsburgh
- Other name: Mike Benedum
- Spouse: Sarah Lantz Benedum
- Children: Claude Worthington Benedum
- Parent(s): Emanuel and Caroline Southworth Benedum

Michael Late Benedum (July 16, 1869 – July 30, 1959) was a wealthy businessman from Pittsburgh, Pennsylvania, who made his fortune in the oil and natural gas industry in the early 20th century. Benedum accumulated immense wealth and became one of the richest men in America. His story is still celebrated in West Virginia and Pennsylvania, where he is considered a true American success story.

== Early life and family ==
Benedum was born in Bridgeport, West Virginia. His mother, Caroline Southworth Benedum, named him after the family doctor Michael Late. Michael attended school until age 16, when he quit to take his first job at the Davison Flour Mill where he worked 12 hours a day and was paid $16 a month.

His only son, Claude Worthington Benedum, was born in 1898 in Cameron, West Virginia, but died at the age of 20 during the 1918 Spanish flu pandemic while working with the United States Army on chemical warfare.

== Career ==
Benedum's career got a lucky start after a chance encounter on a train with a superintendent of the South Penn Oil Company. Benedum was known for his negotiating skills and his success as a wildcatter. He is said to have found "more oil in more places than anyone in history." With his long-term business partner Joe Trees, Benedum created the Benedum-Trees Oil Company. The famous partnership started with the purchase of an oil lease in Pleasants County, West Virginia. The first well on this lease began producing in 1896; soon, six other wells became active. The profit from this lease allowed Benedum and Trees to purchase a dozen additional leases in West Virginia.

The company was responsible for the discovery of the famous Yates Oil Field in Texas. The business was so successful that Benedum appeared on a list of the 76 wealthiest Americans in 1957. He was proclaimed West Virginian of the Year in the same year for leaving much of his wealth to the improvement of the state.

Benedum was a Democrat and donated heavily to the party. The New York Times described him as a "friend" of President Franklin D. Roosevelt. Benedum made a particular effort to convince African Americans, who at that time largely identified with the Republican party, to vote Democratic.

== Legacy and philanthropy ==
Benedum never retired. Though he was very wealthy and 87 years old, The New York Times reported in 1956 that he continued to work seven days a week. In 1910, Benedum sold an oil lease which he had procured in Caddo Parish, Louisiana, for $7 million.

Benedum donated to many charitable causes during his lifetime. He was responsible for the construction of a civic center and a Methodist church building in his hometown of Bridgeport, West Virginia. The wealth from the Benedum estate was placed in a foundation named for the Benedums' son: the Claude Worthington Benedum Foundation. Benedum directed that the foundation use the money for causes local to Pittsburgh and West Virginia. The foundation website claims that have donated over $565,000,000.

In 1950, the Texas Railroad Commission named an oilfield after Michael Benedum. The Benedum Field is located in northeast Upton County, Texas. This honor was given Benedum after his lease produced the discovery well, Alford No. 1, in 1948. This well kicked off the oil boom of the 1940s in the Permian Basin.

A portrait of Benedum hangs in the National Portrait Gallery in Washington, D.C.

A documentary film titled "Michael Benedum: The Wildcatter" was produced in 1980 and tells the story of his life and career.

=== Death ===
Benedum died in 1959 and is interred at Homewood Cemetery.

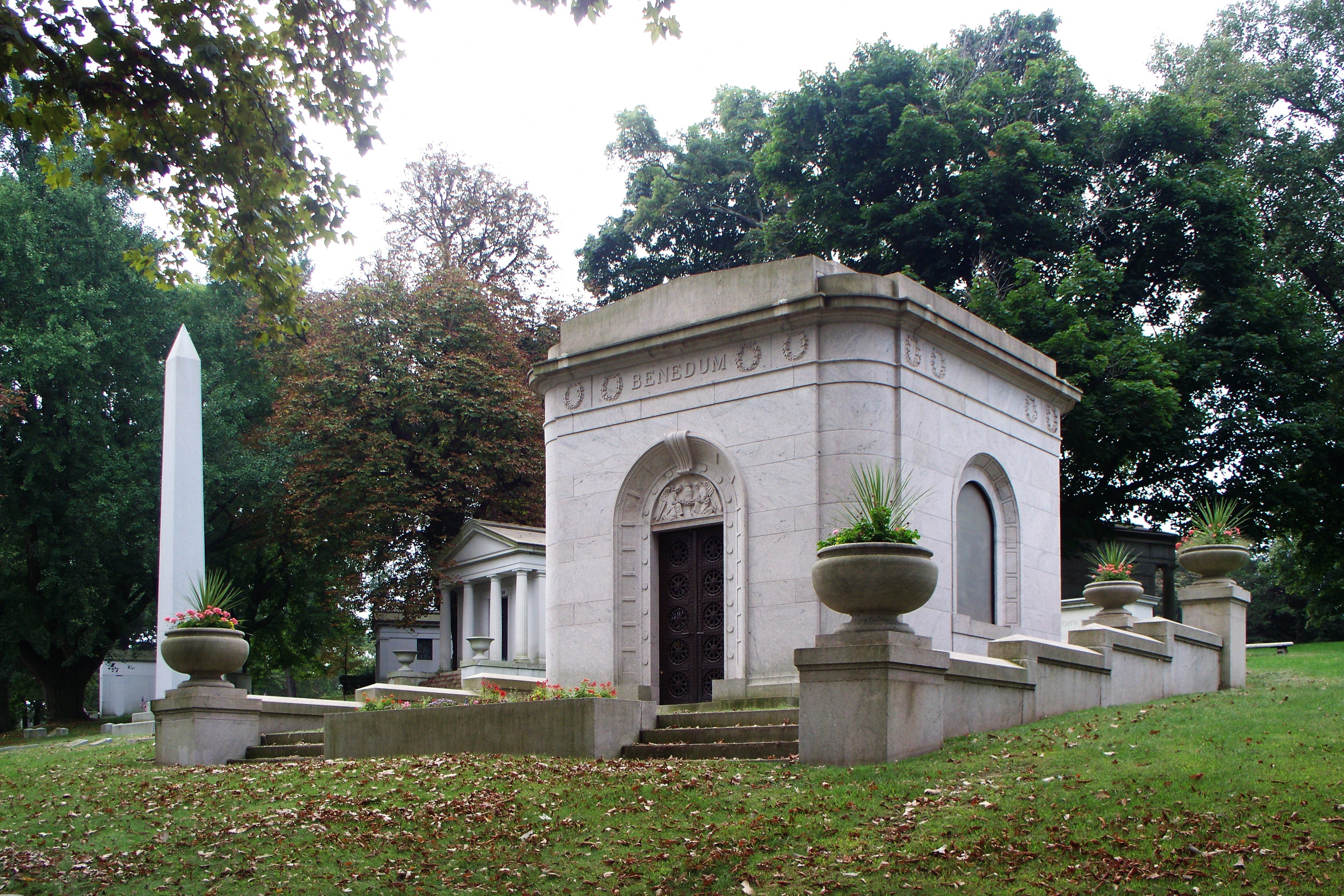
Resting place

=== Eponymous things ===
- Benedum Field: This oil field in Upton County, Texas, was named in his honor after Benedum's lease produced the discovery well Alford No. 1 in 1948.
- Benedum Hall: Located on the campus of West Virginia University, this building houses the university's College of Law. It was constructed with a generous donation from Benedum in 1927.
- Benedum Hall: Home to the School of Engineering at the University of Pittsburgh.
- Benedum Center: This performing arts center in Pittsburgh, Pennsylvania, was built with a donation from Benedum in 1962.
- Benedum Trees Oil Company Building: This historic building in Pittsburgh, Pennsylvania, served as the headquarters for the Benedum-Trees Oil Company for many years. It is now listed on the National Register of Historic Places.
- Michael Late Benedum Chapter of the American Association of Professional Landmen (AAPL): This chapter of the AAPL, a professional organization for landmen in the oil and gas industry, is named in Benedum's honor.
- Benedum Foundation: Established by Benedum in 1944, this foundation supports educational, cultural, and healthcare initiatives in West Virginia and Pennsylvania.
- Benedum scholarship: West Virginia University offers a scholarship in Benedum's name to students from West Virginia who are pursuing careers in the oil and gas industry.
- Benedum Civic Center (Bridgeport, WV) An enlarged replica of Benedums family home used as a public community and event center, build and dedicated by Benedum himself in 1956.
- Benedum Libraries: Several libraries in West Virginia and Pennsylvania bear Benedum's name, including the Benedum Public Library in Bridgeport, West Virginia, the Benedum Library at Salem University, Salem WV, and the Benedum Library at West Virginia University.
- Benedum Airport: In Bridgeport West Virginia. Also known as North Central Regional Airport. Code CKB.
- Benedum Room: This room in the Greenbrier Hotel in White Sulphur Springs, West Virginia, was a favorite of Benedum's and is still named in his honor.
