= Kansas City, Mexico and Orient Railway =

Railway line in Mexico and the USA

Overview
- Locale: Mexico/United States
- Dates of operation: 1900–1928
- Successor: Chihuahua al Pacífico/Atchison, Topeka and Santa Fe Railway

Technical
- Track gauge: 4 ft 8 1/2 in (1,435 mm) standard gauge
- Length: R

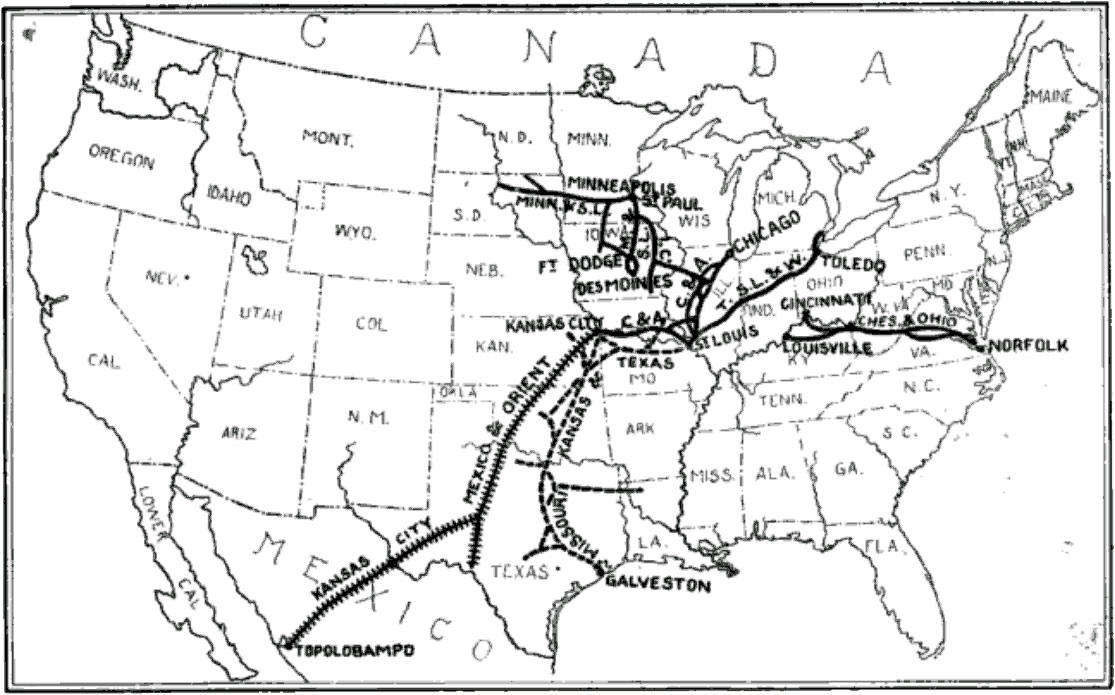
Map of the proposed KCM&O and the companies controlled by Edwin Hawley, between which a traffic arrangement was made

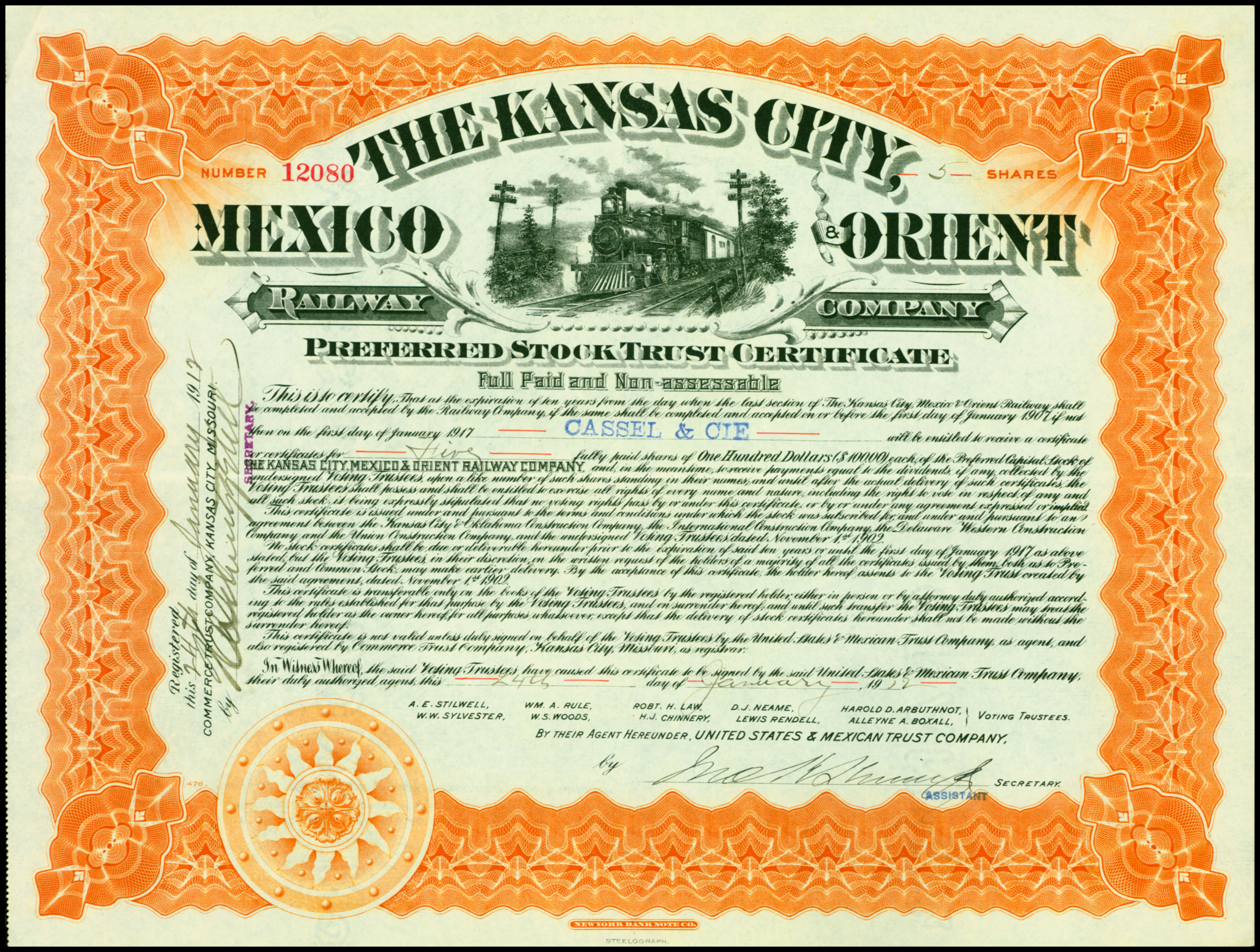
Preferred Stock Trust Certificate of the Kansas City, Mexico & Orient Railway Company

The Kansas City, Mexico and Orient Railway, started in 1900 by American railroad entrepreneur Arthur Edward Stilwell, was the predecessor of the Chihuahua al Pacífico railroad in Mexico. It was intended to reach the Pacific Ocean at Topolobampo, Sinaloa.

The United States portion was incorporated in 1900 as the Kansas City, Mexico, and Orient Railway. It was completed between Wichita, Kansas, and Alpine, Texas. Grading took place between El Dorado and Bazaar, Kansas. Primary shops were first located in Fairview, Oklahoma. In 1910, the Fairview shops were destroyed by fire and the shops were then re-established in Wichita. The railroad was forced into bankruptcy in 1912, but its receiver, William T. Kemper, was to make a fortune when oil was discovered under its tracks. In 1914, it was reorganized as the KCM&O Railroad. Another reorganization in 1925 returned it to its original name. It was popularly called The Orient railroad.

At the end of 1925, KCM&O and KCM&O of Texas (the portions of interstate railroads in Texas were required to be under unique charters) together operated 859 miles (1,382 km) of track over 738 miles (1,188 km) of right of way; they reported a total of 330 million net ton-miles of revenue freight and 8 million passenger-miles. The KCM&O was acquired by the Atchison, Topeka and Santa Fe Railway in 1928, mainly to gain access to the West Texas oil fields. The Santa Fe then sold the Mexican portions. The railway reached Presidio in 1930 and the Presidio–Ojinaga International Rail Bridge was built.

Operating rights on the portion from San Angelo Junction (65 miles [105 km] NEE of San Angelo) to Presidio (known as South Orient Rail Line) later were awarded to Texas Pacifico Transportation.

== See also ==
- Fort Worth and Rio Grande Railway - another attempt to build a railroad line to Topolobampo
- List of Mexican railroads
- List of defunct Texas railroads
