= Glasscock =

Glasscock may refer to:

- Glasscock (surname)
- Glasscock County, Texas, United States
- Glasscock County Courthouse in Garden City, Glasscock County, Texas, U.S.
- Glasscock County Independent School District in Garden City, Texas, U.S.
- Susanne M. Glasscock School of Continuing Studies in Houston, Texas, U.S.

== See also ==
- Glascock
