= George Washington Glasscock =

American politician (1810–1868)

Member of the Texas House of Representatives
- In office 1866–1868

Personal details
- Born: April 11, 1810 Hardin County, Kentucky
- Died: February 28, 1868 (aged 57) Austin, Texas
- Spouse: Cynthia C. Knight
- Children: 10
- Occupation: Settler, politician

George Washington Glasscock (April 11, 1810 – February 28, 1868) was an early settler, legislator, and businessman in Texas.

He was born in Hardin County, Kentucky, near the same area where Abraham Lincoln was born. In 1830, he went to St. Louis and from there to Springfield, Illinois, where in 1832 he was a partner of Abraham Lincoln in flatboating on the Sangamon River. He also fought in the Black Hawk War in Illinois where he was a Lieutenant and Abraham Lincoln was a private under his command. They were mustered into service by then Lt. Robert Anderson of later fame as Major Robert Anderson in command of Fort Sumter at start of Civil War. Lincoln became a surveyor for Sangamon County and Glasscock was a surveyor in Texas but it is not known if the two learned their surveyor skills together. George's sister stayed in Illinois and married a friend of Lincoln's law partner, Herndon. His sister's husband is quoted as saying he had received a letter from George in 1865 and that he stated Lincoln had pardoned him.

In September 1834, he moved to Texas and settled first at Zavala, where he was in business with Thomas Byers Huling and Henry W. Millard. Glasscock was with James Chesshire's company in the Grass Fight and Siege of Béxar. He was a surveyor and many land titles in Central Texas especially near the San Gabriel Rivers were surveyed by him. In a letter to his brother in 1838 he tells him he should come to the San Gabriel area as "the land is cheap and the Indians has not killd me yet".

In 1840, he moved to Bastrop County, Texas and four years later to Travis County. In 1846, he moved yet again to the Williamson County area, where Glasscock helped to organize the county and donated 172 acres (3.9 km^{2}) for the county seat, Georgetown, Texas, which was subsequently named for him.

In 1853, he returned to Travis County. He represented Travis and Williamson counties in the Tenth and Eleventh Texas Legislatures and was one of the managers of the State Lunatic Asylum during the gubernatorial administrations of Sam Houston, Edward Clark, Francis R. Lubbock and Pendleton Murrah. During the American Civil War, he served with the 33rd Texas Cavalry of the Confederate States Army. As a result of his interest in wheat growing, Glasscock built the first flour mill in what was then western Texas. He was an early member of Austin's First Baptist Church and was a Mason. He continued to live in Austin until his death on 28 February 1868. He died when he was thrown from a mule on his land near Webberville.

His son, George Washington Glasscock, Jr., was a State Senator in the Nineteenth, Twentieth and Twenty-first Texas Legislatures.

Glasscock County and Georgetown in Texas are both named in his honor.
