= Saint Lawrence, Texas =

- Unincorporated community
- Location within Texas Location within the United States
- Coordinates: 31°42′9″N 101°32′16″W
- Country: United States
- State: Texas
- County: Glasscock
- Elevation: 2,677 ft (816 m)
- Time zone: UTC-6 (Central (CST))
  - Summer (DST): UTC-5 (CDT)
- GNIS feature ID: 1379005

Saint Lawrence is an unincorporated community in Glasscock County, Texas, United States. It lies south of Garden City, the county seat of Glasscock County. Its elevation is 2,677 feet (816 m).

== Education ==
All parts of the county are in the Glasscock County Independent School District.

All of Glasscock County is in the service area of Howard County Junior College District.
