= Glasscock (surname) =

Glasscock is an English and Welsh habitational surname. In English, it originates from Glascote, whose name combines "glas" (old English for glass) and "cote" (a hut). In Welsh, it refers to Glascoed, which stands for "blue wood" ("glas" + "coed"). The surname may refer to the following notable people:

- Craig Glassock (born 1973), Australian cricketer
- George Washington Glasscock (1810–1868), Texas settler
- J. Samuel Glasscock (1931-2024), American attorney and politician
- Jack Glasscock (1859–1947), American baseball player
- Kent Glasscock (born 1952), American politician
- Marcus Glasscock (1900–1979), Australian rules footballer
- Mary Miller Glasscock (1872–1925), wife of William E. Glasscock
- Rebecca Glasscock, American drag queen
- Robert Glasscock (1797–1878), English first-class cricketer
- William E. Glasscock (1862–1925), American politician

== See also ==
- Glascock (surname)
