= Glascock =

Glascock may refer to

- Glascock (surname)
- Glascock County, Georgia in the United States
- Glascock Prize, an American poetry award

== See also ==
- Glasscock (disambiguation)
