= Garden City High School =

Garden City High School may refer to:

- Garden City High School (Kansas)
- Garden City High School (Michigan)
- Garden City High School (New York)
- Garden City High School (Texas)
