= National Register of Historic Places listings in Glasscock County, Texas =

Location of Glasscock County in Texas

This is a list of the National Register of Historic Places listings in Glasscock County, Texas.

This is intended to be a complete list of properties and districts listed on the National Register of Historic Places in Glasscock County, Texas. There is one property listed on the National Register in the county which is both a State Antiquities Landmark and a Recorded Texas Historic Landmark.

This National Park Service list is complete through NPS recent listings posted March 21, 2025.

== Current listings ==
The locations of National Register properties may be seen in a mapping service provided.

| | Name on the Register | Image | Date listed | Location | City or town | Description |
|---|---|---|---|---|---|---|
| 1 | Glasscock County Courthouse and Jail | Glasscock County Courthouse and Jail | March 21, 2011 (#11000129) | 117 E. Currie St. 31°51′49″N 101°28′49″W | Garden City | State Antiquities Landmark, Recorded Texas Historic Landmark |

== See also ==
- National Register of Historic Places listings in Texas
- Recorded Texas Historic Landmarks in Glasscock County
