= Ion District =

Innovation district in Houston, Texas, U.S.

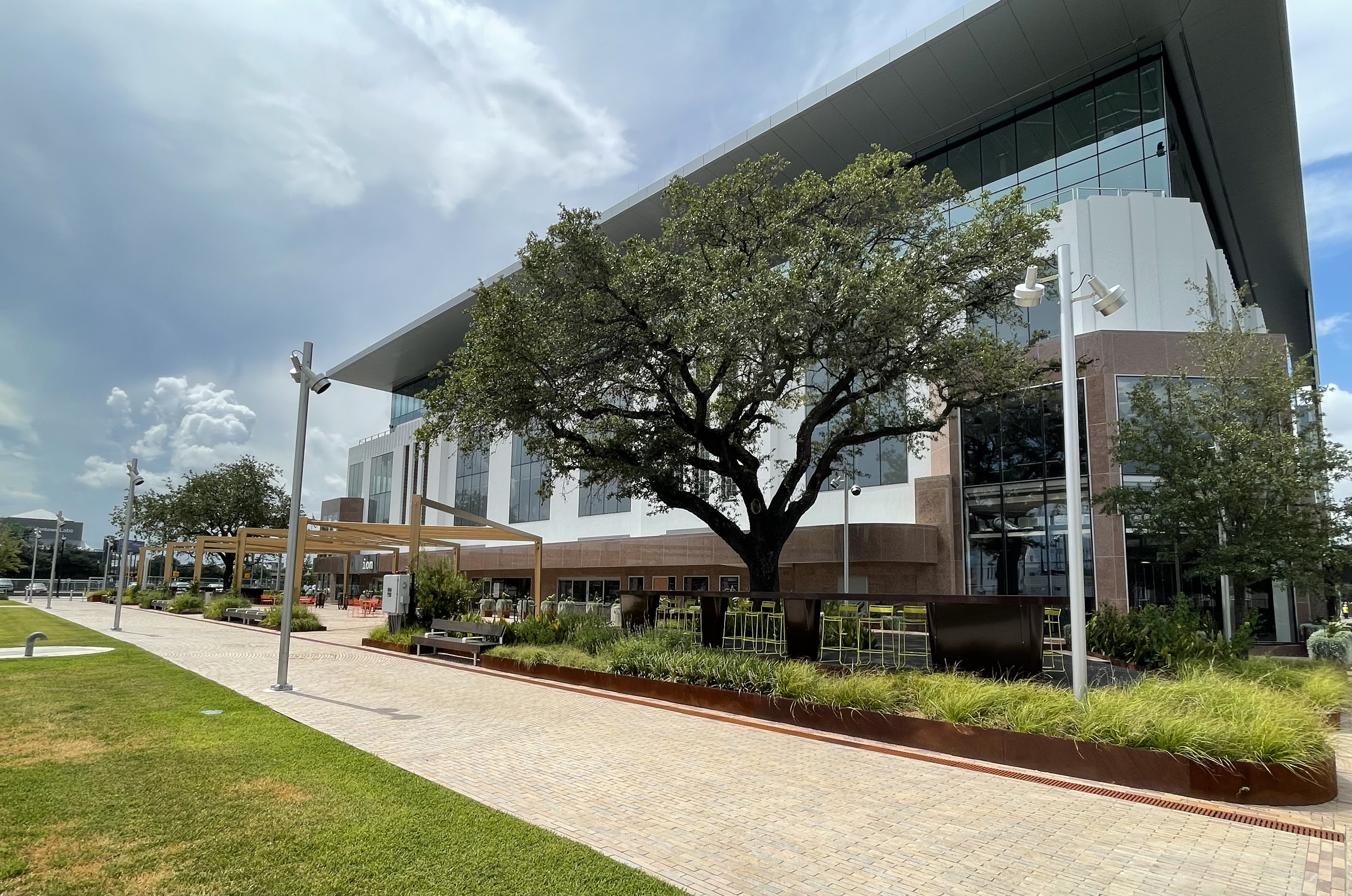
- The Ion construction as of December 2020
- Interactive map of the Ion District area

General information
- Location: Houston, Texas, United States
- Coordinates: 29.73396°N 95.38259°W
- Current tenants: Chevron; Greentown Labs; Microsoft
- Construction started: 2019
- Inaugurated: April 22, 2021
- Owner: Rice University
- Landlord: Rice Management Company

Technical details
- Grounds: 16 acres

Website
- iondistrict.com houinnovate.com

The Ion District, Ion Innovation District, or Rice Innovation District, is a technology park and innovation district in Midtown Houston which was established as a joint initiative between Rice University and the City of Houston. It has also been called the South Main Innovation District. The district's central hub and first building is the Ion, which opened in 2021 after owner Rice Management Company (RMC) converted it from a former Sears store. The building houses coworking and office spaces, business incubators and accelerators, classrooms, a prototyping lab, investor studio, and restaurants. Current tenants include Chevron Technology Ventures, Microsoft, and Liongard. The district also includes Greentown Labs Houston, a business incubator focused on climate technology and sustainable energy, and a large outdoor plaza.

RMC, a division of Rice University, is leading development of the project. Local students and community members have expressed a range of concerns about the project including housing affordability, food accessibility, employment, and the potential gentrification of the nearby Third Ward, a predominantly African-American community. The Ion is located in what was originally Third Ward.

== Description ==
The Ion District is a 16-acre (6.5 ha) innovation district in Midtown, Houston. The district is anchored by the Ion, which serves as a central "hub for startups, corporations, venture capitalists, business accelerator programs, academics and others", according to the Houston Chronicle. The district's Greentown Labs Houston is the largest climate technology and sustainable energy incubator in North America, housed in a building that was previously leased to a Fiesta Mart supermarket. The market was a source of fresh produce for residents in nearby Third Ward which was classified as a food desert. A large plaza designed by James Corner Field Operations is adjacent to the Ion building. The Ion building sits across the street from the Wheeler Transit Center, a major transit hub. The developer also has plans to build a parking garage and a greenway for pedestrians and bicyclists.

=== Ion building ===
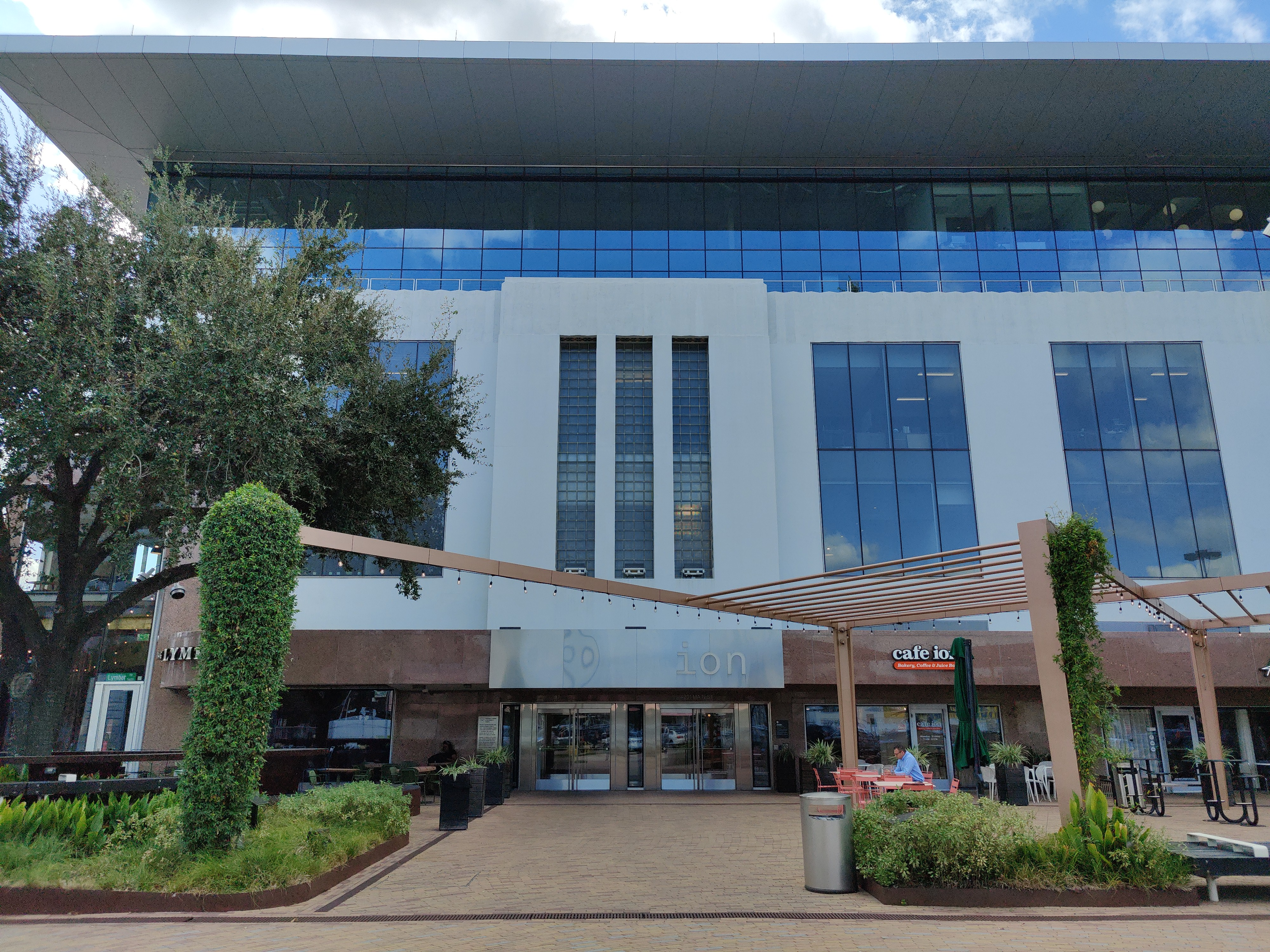
The Ion building (pictured in November 2025) was converted from a former Sears store and serves as the Ion District's central hub.

The Ion is a 266,000-square-foot (24,700 m^{2}), six-level building on Main Street in what was formerly a four-story Sears department store built in 1939 and closed in 2018. The $100 million renovation project, which began in 2019 and was completed in 2021, expanded the building to include two additional floors and involved removing aluminum sheeting, restoring Art Deco architectural stylings, adding additional windows, and constructing a lightwell. The building has coworking and office spaces, business incubators and accelerators, classrooms, a prototyping lab, investor studio, and restaurants. The building's Forum Stairs event area includes seating for up to 250 people.

Tenants include Chevron Technology Ventures, Microsoft, and the coworking company Common Desk. TXRX Labs operates the 6,500 square foot Ion Prototyping Lab (IPL), which provides equipment, engineering and technical support, and training to member entrepreneurs and startups. Equipment includes 3D printers, laser cutters, lathes, CNC mills, and other manufacturing tools. Eateries include Late August (a collaboration involving retired professional athlete and chef Dawn Burrell), The Lymbar (by David and Michael Cordúa), Second Draught, and Common Bond On-the-Go, an outpost of a bakery located in Houston's Montrose neighborhood.

In 2021, the Ion's management team invited local artists to submit proposals for site-specific art installations in windows along two streets. Works by two winning artists or teams will rotate every six months. The commission budget was $20,000 per display. Works by Lina Dib and Preston Gaines were installed in 2022; Dib's Self-Portrait in the Garden has been described as "a lush, though thoroughly artificial garden of Astro turf, plastic plants and pink flamingos" with "a horizontal screen, suspended at a slight angle, which captures and transplants images of people in front of the window into a virtual garden of psychedelic foliage, which incrementally covers up the mirrored subject unless he/she/they move their body".

=== Greentown Labs Houston ===
Located on San Jacinto Street, Greentown Labs Houston is an incubator and the second U.S. location operated by Somerville, Massachusetts-based Greentown Labs. The approximately 40,000-square-foot (3,700 m^{2}) incubator provides funding and office space for approximately 50 startups. The retrofitted building was previously operated and vacated by Fiesta Mart and has community spaces, labs, concrete floors, loading docks, and a trash compactor.

== History ==
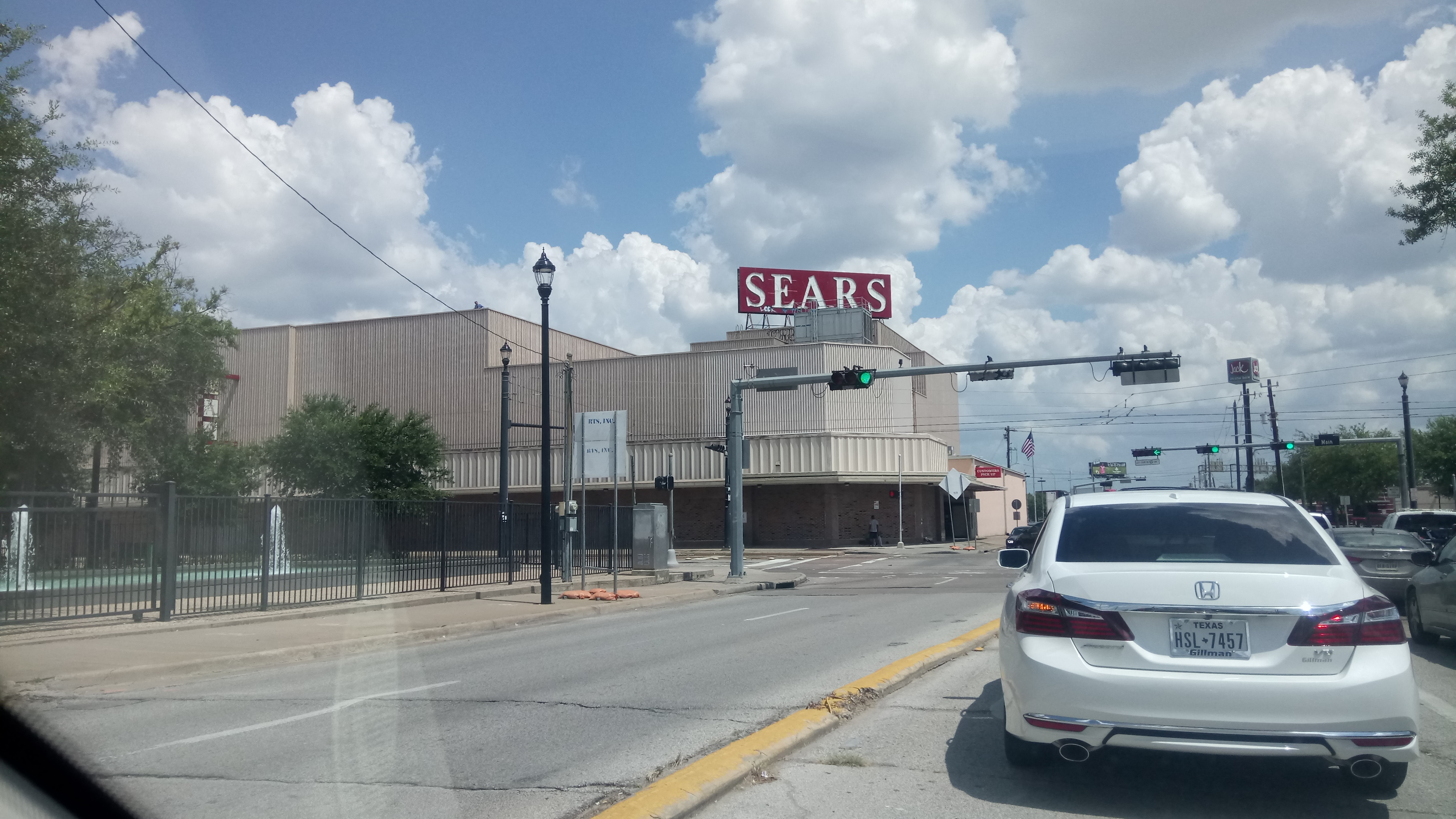
2017 photograph of the Sears store which was converted into the Ion

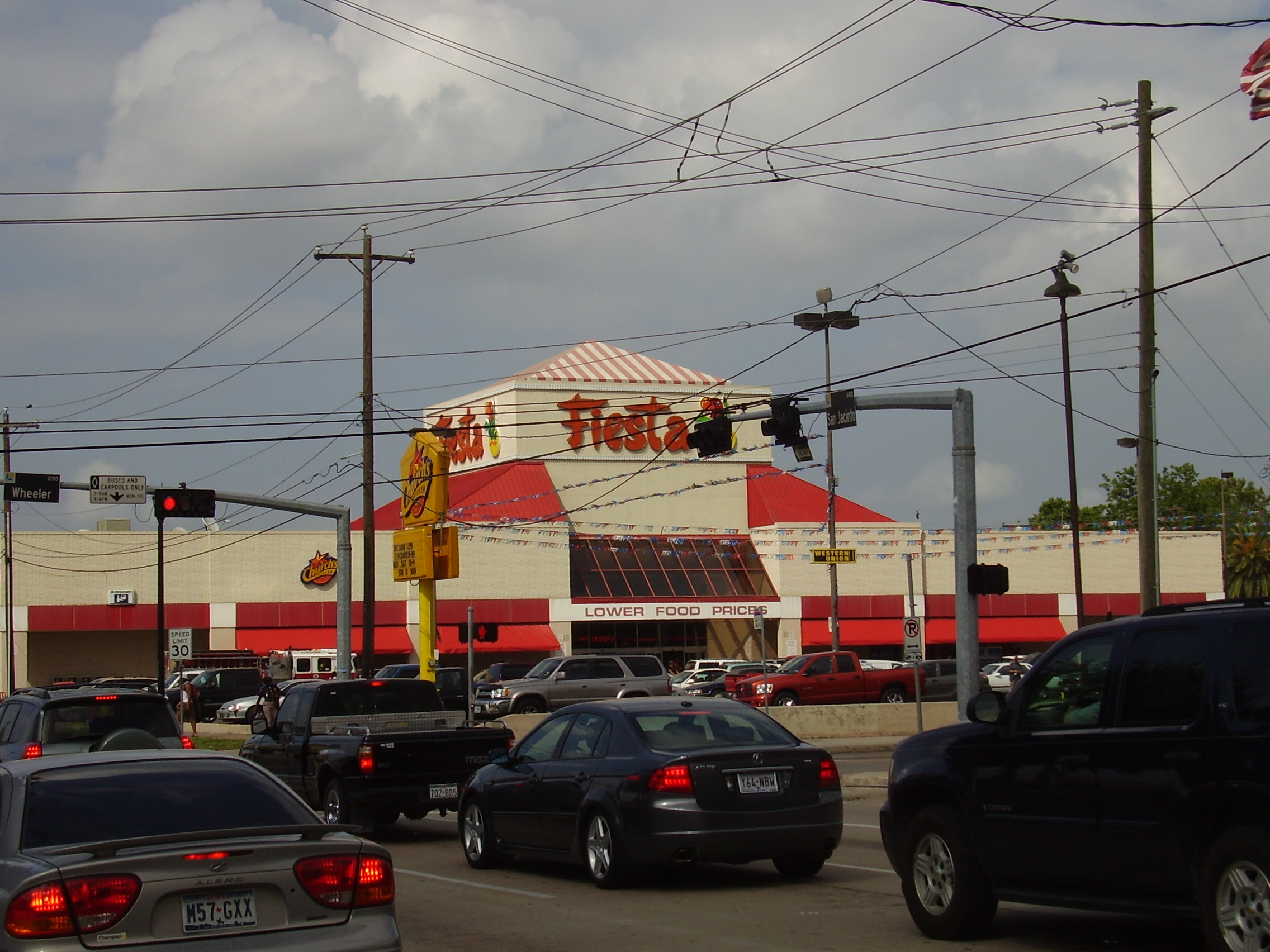
2000s photograph of the Fiesta Mart store which was converted into the incubator Greentown Labs Houston

=== Development ===
Rice Management Company (RMC) and its partners announced plans to convert a former Sears store into an innovation center in April 2018. The department store chain had a 99-year lease agreement with Rice University since 1945, and RMC bought the company out of the lease in 2017. RMC led the expansion and renovation of the store, which closed in 2018. SHoP Architects, Gensler, James Carpenter Design Associates, and Walter P Moore designed the new structure.

In July 2019, Houston mayor Sylvester Turner, Rice University president David Leebron, and representatives of the city attended a groundbreaking ceremony for the Ion's redevelopment. Master plans for the district were revealed in November 2019. Jan Odegard, the former executive director of Rice University's Ken Kennedy Institute, became the Ion's executive director in June 2020. During the COVID-19 pandemic, the Ion hosted online programming, including "Family Tech Night" and events for startups.

In mid 2020, Greentown Labs announced plans to open a second incubator in Houston, having considered the city since 2019. In September 2020, the firm confirmed plans to retrofit a former Fiesta Mart store, which the operator had closed two months prior because of declining sales. Additionally, Greentown Labs revealed plans to raise $10 million for the renovation project and three years of working capital. The firm had raised approximately $8 million by September 2020, and building construction began the following month.

In February 2021, Turner hosted a "reveal" ceremony for the incubator, which had approximately 20 corporate partners and 16 inaugural startups at the time. Companies that contributed to the project included BHP, CenterPoint Energy, Chevron, Gexa Energy, Shell, Vinson & Elkins, Wells Fargo, and Williams. In April 2021, Greentown Labs received a certificate of occupancy and 30 companies began moving into the space. The incubator opened on Earth Day 2021. The grand opening ceremony was livestreamed and had limited in-person attendance because of the pandemic, which also forced Greentown Labs Houston to scale back programming temporarily.

==== Tenants and property management ====
Chevron Technology Ventures was named the first tenant and program partner for the Ion in August 2020. Microsoft, which also became a program partner, announced in August 2020 it would invest $1 million into social entrepreneurship programs as part of its participation, and was confirmed as a tenant, along with Common Desk, in late 2020. Houston-based Transwestern became the property manager in November 2020.

The Austin-based innovation and mentorship provider Capital Factory has Houston headquarters in the Ion, as of 2021. In October 2021, the musical theatre production company Theatre Under The Stars (TUTS) announced plans to establish an education and arts center as an anchor tenant in the next phase of the district's development. TXRX Labs has operated the Ion Prototyping Lab since January 2022. In addition to the tenant restaurants in the Ion building, Stuff'd Wings has been a district tenant since April 2022. Established in 2019, the restaurants previously operated as a food truck.

==== Partnerships and accelerators ====
The Ion district announced its first academic partnership in January 2020; Rice University's Susanne M. Glasscock School of Continuing Studies offered courses on computer and data science, financial services, human resources, leadership development, and project management to Ion members. In March 2020, the Ion and the Austin-based nonprofit organization DivInc announced a partnership to develop programs for women and minority entrepreneurs. The Latinx Startup Alliance partnered with the Ion to support Latino entrepreneurs and began hosting virtual programming in October 2020. The Houston-based law firm Baker Botts joined Chevron Technology Ventures and Microsoft as a founding partner in March 2021. According to Community Impact Newspaper, the energy, life sciences, and technology-focused firm "has supported The Ion since its inception and has provided programming over the last few years". Aramco Americas also joined as a founding partner. In addition to being a tenant, Capital Factory formed a programming partnership with the Ion in October 2021 to offer events and resources on-site for startups.

The Ion's Accelerator Hub includes the Ion Smart and Resilient Cities Accelerator (ISRCA), the Aerospace Innovation Accelerator for Minority Business Enterprises (AIA for MBEs), the Rice Alliance Clean Energy Accelerator, and DivInc Houston. The Ion team established the ISRCA in September 2019 to focus on disaster recovery. Community Impact Newspaper has said the ISRCA "addresses the needs of Houston and cities across America by deploying technology into existing civic infrastructure", and participating startups "have the chance to build relationships with mentors, corporate networks, municipality decision-makers, and stakeholder partners, and gain exposure in the Greater Houston region". The AIA for MBEs supports startups in their development of solutions for aerospace-related challenges, and the Rice Alliance Clean Energy Accelerator focuses on sustainable energy projects.

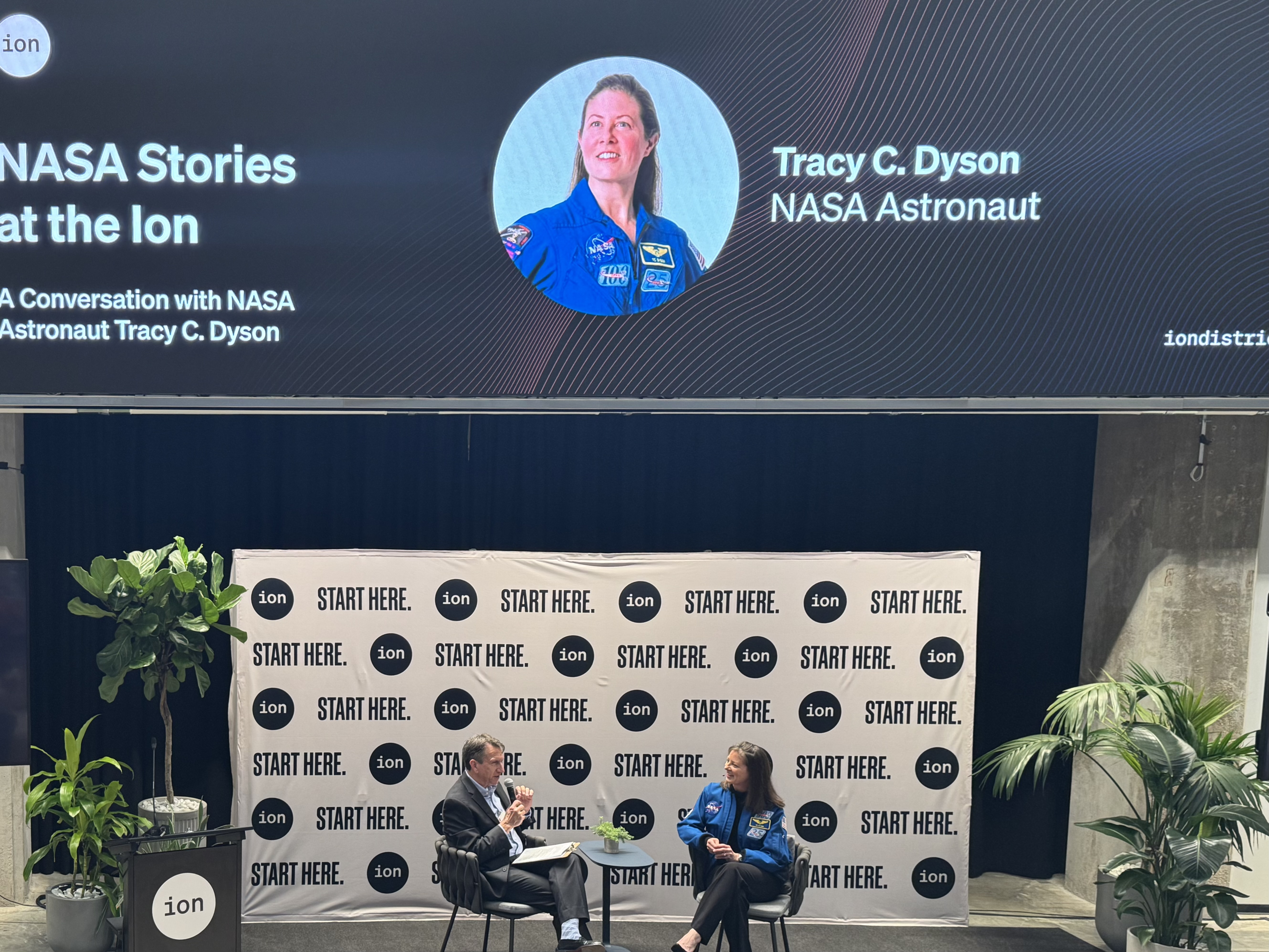
Conversation with NASA astronaut Tracy C. Dyson

In September 2020, the district received $1.5 million from the Economic Development Administration's Build to Scale program to support the Accelerator Hub's creation. The district received a $1.4 million federal grant from the Minority Business Development Agency in October 2020 to establish an aerospace engineering accelerator in partnership with NASA's Johnson Space Center and DivInc. The ISRCA's third cohort began a 12-week program at the Ion in March 2021. The AIA for MBEs launched in April 2021, with four BIPOC-owned companies selected to participate in the first 12-week program.

=== Community benefits agreement ===
At the Ion's groundbreaking ceremony in July 2019, students from Rice, Texas Southern University, the University of Houston and local high schools, who had formed the Student Coalition for a Just and Equitable Innovation Corridor to advocate for a community benefits agreement. In January 2020, representatives of 17 student groups wrote a letter to university president Leebron asking RMC to guarantee community benefits to local residents. Students asked Rice to collaborate with the Houston Coalition for Equitable Development Without Displacement (HCEDD), a group of community organizations, residents, and students concerned about the potential gentrification of the Third Ward, a historically and predominantly African-American community. The group tried to develop an exclusive and separate CBA with RMC which would not include the City of Houston as the counterparty, in alignment with the widely accepted definition of a CBA.

Later in January 2020, Turner announced that the City of Houston would negotiate a "community benefits agreement" (CBA) with RMC in response to concerns about community impact raised by individuals representing a variety of organizations largely concentrated in the nearby Third Ward, a neighborhood to the east of the Ion. Such an agreement is typically considered a development agreement, as it is between a developer and a local governmental planning agency, rather than between a developer and a community coalition.

After Turner and Rice agreed to negotiate a development agreement, RMC and the City of Houston organized a workshop series which included a presentation of the district, a panel discussion of community experts, and breakout sessions for public input. Following the series, RMC convened a working group of civic and community stakeholders to help identify commitments to be documented in the development agreement between Rice and the City of Houston. Stakeholders included representatives from Houston's Black and Hispanic chambers of commerce as well as residents of communities surrounding the district. After meeting with HCEDD's eight-member negotiation team representing 32 organizations, RMC offered HCEDD four positions to participate in the working group. After several months, the working group produced a report that recommended commitments for both Rice and the City of Houston in three focus areas of economic opportunity: housing affordability, inclusive contracting, and hiring. HCEDD, which did not participate in the working group after not being allowed to participate in full with their elected negotiation team, criticized the working group's report and process saying the "recommendations did not go far enough".

HCEDD proposed an alternative set of commitments that included cultural preservation, enforcement provisions, and more ambitious housing elements, including "a net loss of zero affordable housing units on its residential properties as a result of the Ion district." HCEDD also continued to demand a community benefits agreement with RMC which would not include the City of Houston. After the working group released its report, the City of Houston and Rice began negotiations and presented a proposed development agreement to the City Council for approval that included $15.3 million dollars in direct community investments to affordable housing, community capacity building, and support for underrepresented entrepreneurs as well as project-based contracting and investment opportunities for minority- and women-owned business enterprises (MWBEs) and underrepresented individuals. A board member for the Midtown Tax Increment Reinvestment Zone, which had recently approved a $65 million reimbursement deal for the project, voiced concerns that Rice was “not putting enough money into the pot” with regard to affordable housing preservation in the district and clarified that "the community benefits agreement should include a local group, not the city."

The proposed development agreement was introduced to City Council for approval on November 3, 2021. The mayor was not present for the City Council meeting and six councilmembers initiated a procedural delay of the vote for a week. The following week, the Houston City Council approved the agreement by a vote of 14 to 3. According to the Houston Chronicle, the agreement includes a "$5 million investment fund for minorities and women in tech, $4.5 million for affordable housing developers, and $2 million in technology sector job training", among other community-focused initiatives. District K Councilmember and Vice Mayor Pro-Tem Martha Castex Tatum said the agreement sets a new precedent for community members and developers to work together in Houston and that it was "more than any developer has ever done in the history of development agreements." Opponents to the development agreement in the community and on city council voiced support for the Ion but criticized the approval of a community benefits agreement that is not a "research-based and academically sound CBA."

=== Houston Coalition for Equitable Development Without Displacement (HCEDD) ===
The Houston Coalition for Equitable Development without Displacement, also known as HCEDD, formed in October and held its first community meeting in November 2019 in pursuit of a community benefits agreement with Rice Management Company. The Ion's executive director at the time, Gaby Rowe, was invited to give a presentation on the innovation district and field questions before the public forums held by Rice and the City of Houston in September 2020. In addition to a CBA, student members of the coalition seek a Racial Equity Impact Assessment, as well as public transparency about Rice's community engagement efforts and neighborhood survey. Over the course of several months of public meetings, the coalition came to make up over twenty organizations, formed working groups, and elected a negotiation team. HCEDD has also held public workshops about the research behind the CBA process with Dr. Murtaza Baxamusa, known for his research on community benefits agreements.

=== City of Houston ===
Shortly after a January 20 open letter from a Rice student coalition demanding a CBA with the Houston Coalition for Equitable Development without Displacement and the introduction of a January 27 Student Association resolution, Mayor Turner on January 29 wrote to the president of Rice's Student Association that he has told Andy Icken, the city's chief development officer, to negotiate a "CBA" with Rice Management Company and coordinate community input. Such an agreement between a municipality and a developer is traditionally described as a development agreement rather than a community benefits agreement, which by definition must include a community coalition. The City of Houston facilitated online informational webinars alongside RMC in September and October 2020 on job-training, housing affordability, and hiring opportunities.

=== Rice Student Association Senate Resolution #8 ===
The Rice University Student Association Senate passed a resolution on February 17, 2020, in support of a community benefits agreement process for the Innovation District. The resolution states that a CBA is "project‐specific contract between developers or cities and community coalitions. CBAs are legally binding, enforceable agreements that call for a range of benefits to be produced by the development project. They allow community groups to have a voice in shaping a project, to press for community benefits that are tailored to their particular needs, and to enforce the developer's promises," and asks that RMC make HCEDD an equal party in the CBA negotiation process, as well as create processes for public openness and transparency. Allison Thacker and Ryan LeVasseur, RMC's president and director of real estate respectively, argued against the resolution, stating that HCEDD does not have legal authority to enter into a CBA contract and that the large coalition represents a substantive portion, but not the entire community. Students also shared that RMC "threatened to disown the [Student Association] as a legitimate campus body if the SA Senate passed a resolution supporting the HCEDD as a signatory party in the CBA."

== Funding ==
Rice Management Company has announced plans to invest $100 million in renovation for The Ion. The Ion falls within Tax Increment Reinvestment Zone (TIRZ) #2, and RMC is seeking $75M in cost reimbursement from City of Houston taxes that are expected as a result of development on properties within the innovation district. The Ion falls within a Texas Census block group that is both a Texas Enterprise Zone and an Opportunity zone, qualifying it for certain financial incentives at the local, state, and federal levels. These can also result in tens of millions of dollars in cost savings for the developer through taxpayer subsidies over the course of a decade.

=== Texas Enterprise Zone ===
Enterprise Zones are census block groups in Texas with a poverty rate at or above 20%. They are a way to collect various local and state incentives together to spur innovation in order to revitalize an area that is considered distressed. Local benefits may include but aren't limited to tax abatement, permitting fee waivers, publicly owned buildings transferred below market cost, and low-interest loans. State benefits may include state sales and use tax refunds, depending on the level of investment and the number of jobs created.

=== Opportunity Zone ===
This federal program is also for areas that are considered distressed, providing tax benefits such as tax abatement to private investors in hopes of creating economic development and jobs in those areas. These census tracts were nominated by Governor Greg Abbott, seeking to address issues including risk of economic disrupters such as hurricanes, relatively low population density, and persistent unemployment. A 2020 report found that many opportunity zone beneficiaries are real estate investors who were likely to still do the development even without taxpayer subsidies, rather than companies that are creating jobs.

=== Midtown Tax Increment Reinvestment Zone (TIRZ) #2 ===
On August 26, 2021, the board of the Midtown TIRZ voted to approve an economic development agreement between the TIRZ and Rice Management Company. In exchange for leading infrastructure improvements and building a new parking garage within the Innovation District, the TIRZ will provide $65 million in cost reimbursements for RMC's investment. Despite months of critical feedback requesting that the TIRZ require RMC to enter into a Community Benefits Agreement with a community coalition before approving the deal, six of the seven board members voted for the agreement. Board member Caton Fenz, CEO of ConnectGen, noted that the development may incidentally result in some affordable housing, however the agreement does not include any mention of affordable housing or any measures to address gentrification, particularly in the Third Ward community neighboring Midtown. The Midtown TIRZ has bought an estimated $72 million worth of land in Third Ward covering 4 million square feet.

=== Academics ===
Rice University's Glasscock School of Continuing Studies was the first school to announce coursework at the Ion, including data science and financial services.

=== Tenants ===
- Aerospace Innovation Hub (NASA partnership)
- Baker Botts
- Chevron Technology Ventures
- Greentown Labs
- Microsoft
- Schlumberger
- Common Desk

=== Recreation ===
==== Restaurants ====
The district has the following restaurants either open or in development:

- Common Bond
- Late August
- Shipley Do-Nuts
- Stuff’d Wings
