= Mona Vale, New South Wales =

Mona Vale
- Suburb
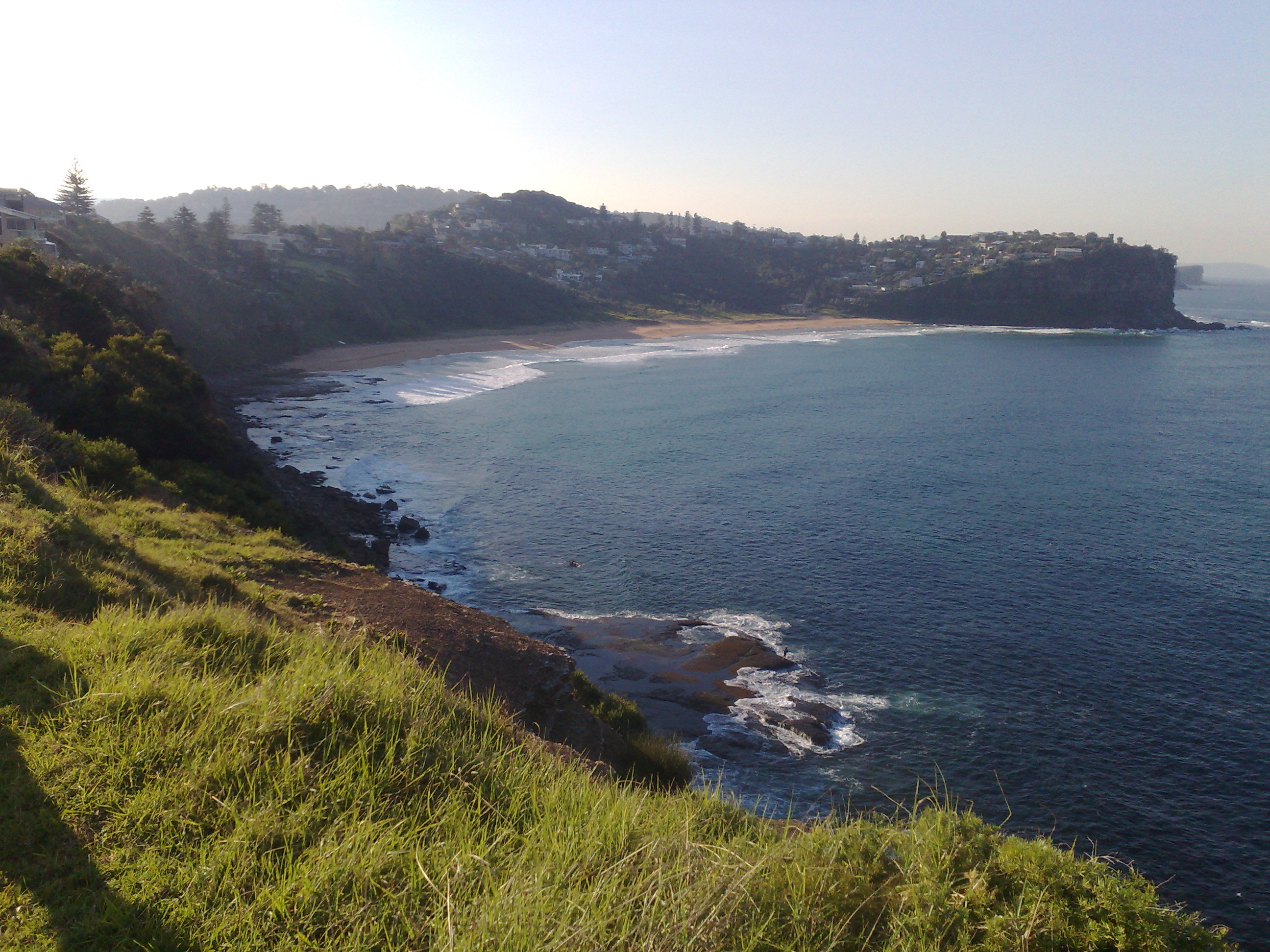
- Mona Vale Beach facing north

- Interactive map of Mona Vale
- Country: Australia
- State: New South Wales
- City: Sydney
- LGA: Northern Beaches Council
- Location: 28 km (17 mi) north of Sydney CBD

Government
  - State electorate: Pittwater
  - Federal division: Mackellar

Area
  - Total: 4.6 km^{2} (1.8 sq mi)
- Elevation: 10 m (33 ft)

Population
  - Total: 10,877 (SAL 2021)
- Postcode: 2103
Suburbs around Mona Vale
Bayview	Newport
Ingleside	Mona Vale	Tasman Sea
Ingleside	Warriewood

Mona Vale is a suburb of Sydney, in the state of New South Wales, Australia. It is located 28 kilometres north of the Sydney central business district, in an area known as the Northern Beaches. Formerly the administrative centre of Pittwater Council, it is now located in the local government area of Northern Beaches Council. The traditional custodians of the area are the Garigal people. It is often colloquially referred to as "Mona".

== History ==
The area was known as "Bongin Bongin" by Aboriginal Peoples. The initial land grants in the district of Pittwater were not made until April 1813, and those sections which now comprise Mona Vale, first surveyed in May 1814, were granted to Robert Campbell (1769–1846). These were originally part of 700 acres (2.8 km^{2}) that extended northwards from Mona Vale to the end of Newport beach. Local lore suggests the name Mona Vale was chosen by Campbell in remembrance of a town bearing the same name in Scotland, however the exact location of this place remains a mystery.

Pittwater Council, after the council chambers moved from Warriewood. Since then, Pittwater Council has been amalgamated with Warringah and Manly to form the Northern Beaches Council on the 12th of May 2016.

== Landmarks ==
Mona Vale has two primary schools and a high school, an RSL club, a park, public library, golf course, hospital, a world class skate park, a bus depot, three supermarkets, and a variety of shops and businesses. There are also a number of pathways and walking tracks around the area.

Mona Vale Hospital is the local public healthcare facility, which has been undergoing a process of re-development since the opening of the newly built Northern Beaches Hospital (in nearby Frenchs Forest).

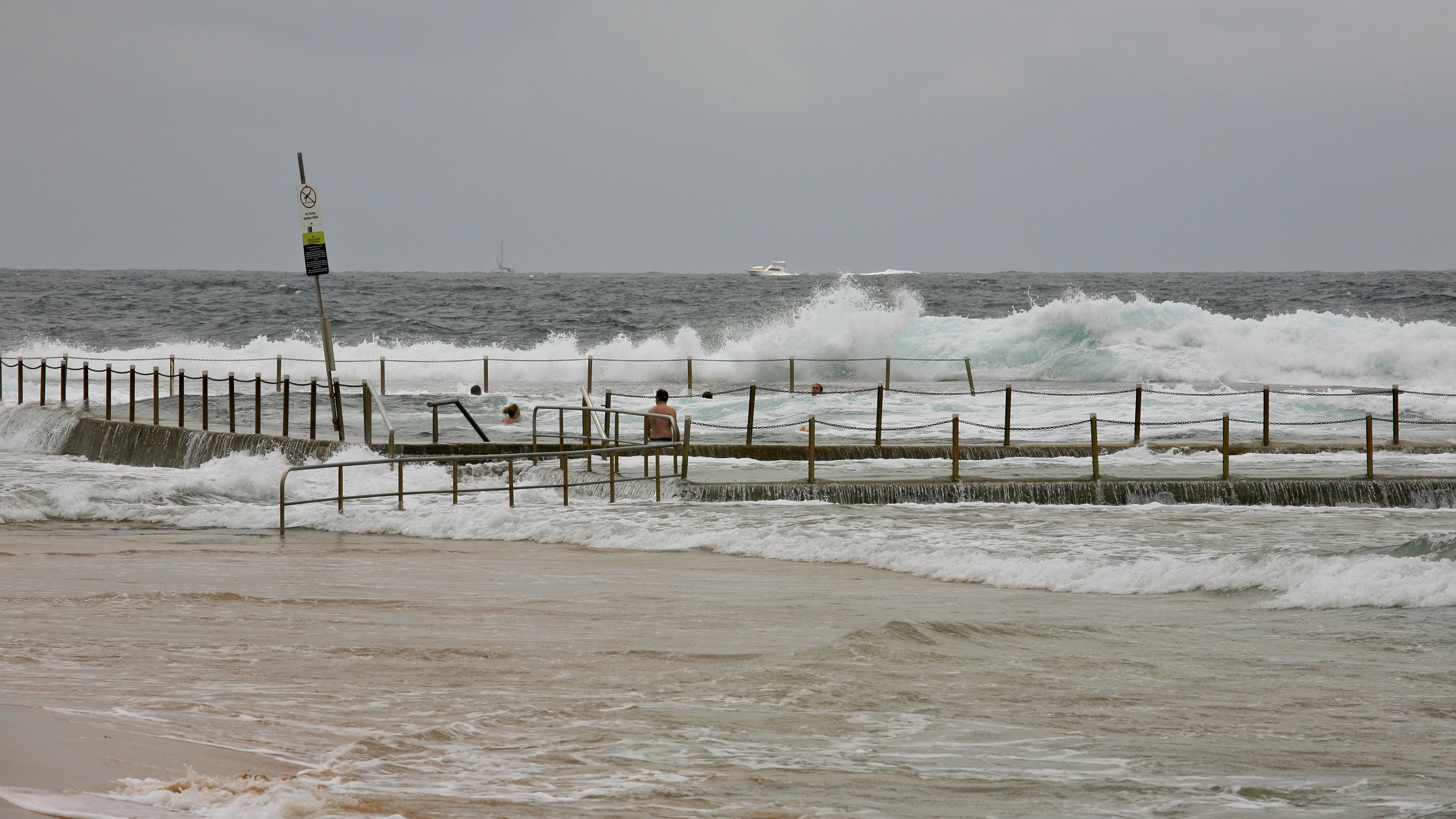
Mona Vale Ocean Pool

Mona Vale has a shallow beach which has a children's and lap pool at its northern end, with the main beach adjoining the golf course and a number of parks and reserves. There is a second beach north of this which is known as "The Basin" with a concentrated wave which, since the early 2000s, has been known as "Whomp" which is popular with body boarders. Mona Vale is a popular beach for surfing with beach breaks including "Main", "Suck Rock" which holds the annual competition known as KOTR or king of the rock, and "Rip Bowl".

== Population ==
In the 2021 Australian Census, there were 10,877 people domiciled in Mona Vale, of which 71.3% of these were born in Australia. The most common other countries of birth were England 7.4%, New Zealand 2.0% and South Africa 1.3%. The area is relatively linguistically homogeneous, with 85.3% of residents speaking only English at home. Other languages spoken at home included Serbian 1.0%, Croatian 1.0% and Portuguese 0.9%. The most common responses for religion were No Religion 39.8%, Catholic 22.8% and Anglican 16.6%.

== Transport ==
Mona Vale is located at the junction of two major roads (Mona Vale Road A3 and Pittwater Road A8) and is accessible by B-Line bus from central Sydney (Wynyard Station). There is a local bus depot located on Darley Street.

== Churches ==
Mona Vale is home to the following churches:

- Sacred Heart Catholic Church
- Mona Vale Anglican Church
- Christian Life Centre
- Mona Vale Seventh-day Adventist Church
- Healing Word Church
- Pittwater Wesleyan Methodist Church
- Ignite Cafe Church

== Education ==
Mona Vale is home to three schools; two primary and one secondary:

- Sacred Heart Catholic Primary School
- Mona Vale Public School
- Pittwater High School

== Sports ==
While many outdoor activities in Mona Vale are primarily aquatic, the suburb is also home to a variety of sporting clubs and associations:

- Mona Vale Raiders Rugby League Club
- Pittwater RSL Football Club
- Peninsula Netball Club
- Mona Vale Cricket Club
- Peninsula Junior Cricket Club
- Mona Vale Surf Lifesaving Club
- Mona Vale Boardriders
- Mona Vale Commodores Netball Club
- Pittwater Tigers AFL Club
- Pittwater Aquatic Club
- Mona Vale Bowling Club

== Notable people ==
- Jock Blackwood, rugby union player
- Jerry Cassell, cricketer
- Kieran Darcy-Smith, actor, film director, and screenwriter
- Dragan Durdevic, rugby league player
- Craig Glassock, cricketer
- Clinton Gutherson, rugby league player
- Sam Hall, skier
- Luke Holmes, rugby union player
- Sami Kennedy-Sim, skier
- Blake Leary, rugby league player
- Stephen Madsen, actor
- Llew O'Brien, politician
- Matt Philip, rugby union player
- Sam Rickard, Paralympic track athlete
- Bailey Simonsson, rugby league player
- Rob Stokes, former politician
- Steve Storey, cricketer
- Clayton Tanner, baseball player
- Jake Trbojevic, rugby league player
- Tom Trbojevic, rugby league player
- Bradley Tippett, baseball player
- Jack Vidgen, singer and television personality
