= Lorenzo de Zavala State Archives and Library Building =

Coordinates: 30.2739°N 97.7384°W

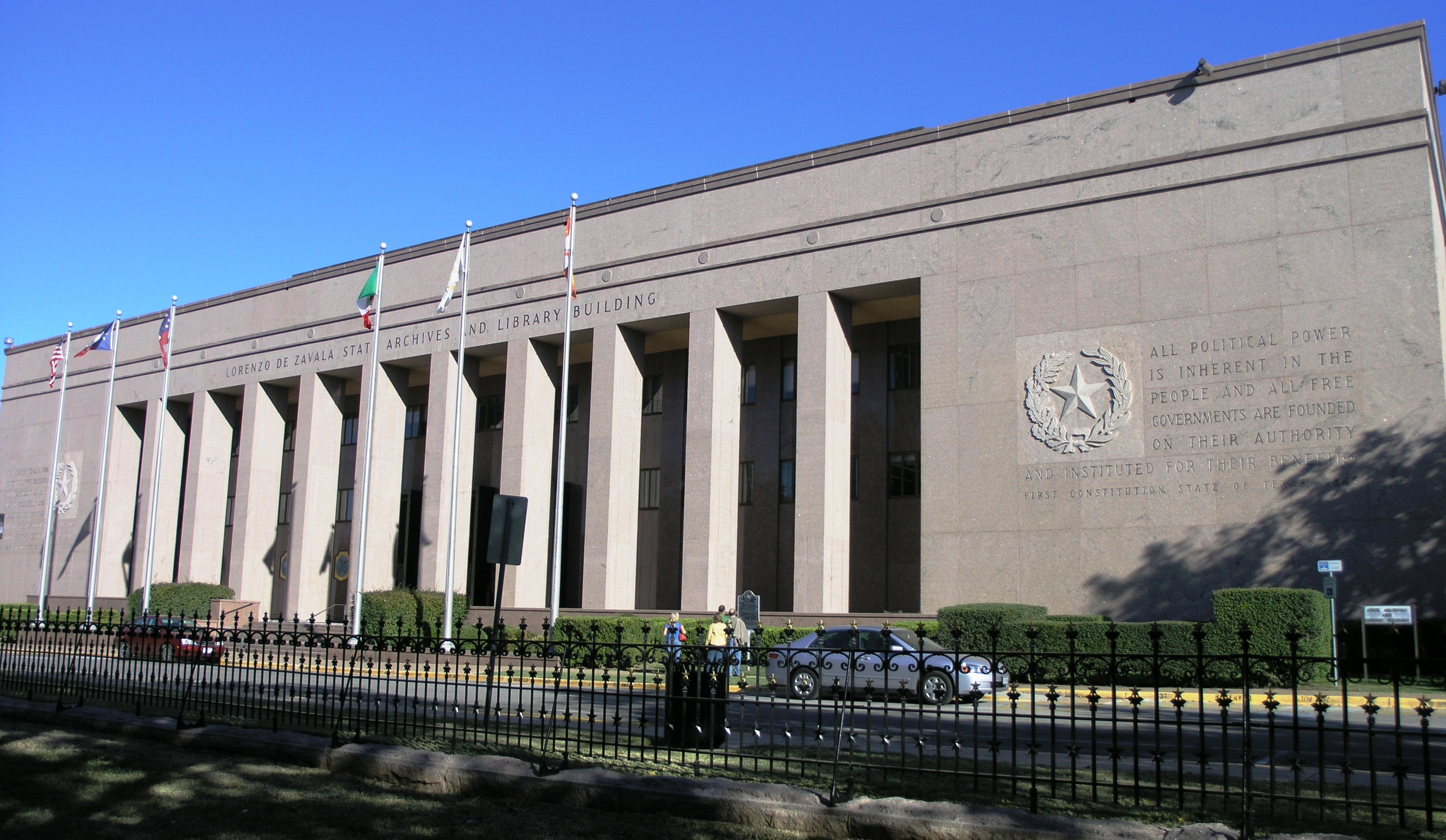
- Front entrance of Lorenzo de Zavala State Archives and Library Building
- Interactive map of the Lorenzo de Zavala State Archives and Library Building area

General information
- Architectural style: Stripped Classical
- Location: Austin, Texas
- Construction started: 1959
- Completed: 1961

Design and construction
- Architect: Carleton W. Adams

The Lorenzo de Zavala State Archives and Library Building is a state library and historic landmark in Downtown Austin, Texas.

The building is named in honor of Lorenzo de Zavala, a statesman in Texas history.

Built in 1959 and inaugurated in 1961, the building houses the headquarters of the Texas State Library and Archives Commission, and is located east of and adjacent to the Texas State Capitol, and made of the same pink granite as the capitol building. (Sunset Red Texas Granite, see Granite Mountain (Texas)).

The building celebrated a renovation in 2009, with former first lady Laura Bush as speaker of dedicating ceremony.
