= Dragan Durdevic =

Australian rugby league player

Personal information
- Full name: Dragan Durdevic
- Born: 26 July 1976 (age 48); Mona Vale, New South Wales, Australia
- Height: 186 cm (6 ft 1 in)
- Weight: 103 kg (16 st 3 lb)

Playing information
- Position: Second-row, Prop
Club
Years	Team	Pld	T	G	FG	P
1997–99	Manly Sea Eagles	2	0	0	0	0
2000	Northern Eagles	9	1	0	0	4
2003	Villeneuve Leopards			0	0
	Total	11	1	0	0	4
- Source: As of 27 Sep 2022

Dragan Durdevic (/ˈdræɡən ˈdɜːrdəvɪk/) (born 26 July 1976) is an Australian former professional rugby league footballer of Serbian descent.

== Professional playing career ==
Durdevic made his NRL début with the Manly-Warringah club on 31 August 1997 against the South Sydney Rabbitohs at Brookvale Oval in a 36–18 victory. Durdevic made one further appearance for the Manly side before moving to the Northern Eagles for the 2000 NRL season where he went on to make nine appearances and score a try. Durdevic finished his career in France with the Villeneuve Leopards in 2003.
