= Jerry Cassell =

Australian cricketer (born 1975)

Personal information
- Born: 12 January 1975 (age 51); Mona Vale, New South Wales, Australia
- Source: Cricinfo, 1 October 2020

Jerry Cassell (born 12 January 1975) is an Australian cricketer who played in fourteen first-class matches for Queensland between 1996 and 2002.

== See also ==
- List of Queensland first-class cricketers
