= Garden City High School (Texas) =

Coordinates: 31.8665°N 101.4845°W

Location
- 240 W Bearkat Ave. Garden City, Texas 79739-0009; United States

Information
- School type: Public high school
- Motto: Achieving Excellence Together
- School district: Glasscock County Independent School District
- Principal: Steve Cates
- Teaching staff: 18.81 (FTE)
- Grades: 7-12
- Enrollment: 162 (2023–2024)
- Student to teacher ratio: 8.61
- Colors: Red, white, and black
- Athletics conference: UIL Class A
- Mascot: Bearkat
- Yearbook: Bearkat
- Website: Garden City High School

Garden City High School is a public high school located in Garden City, Texas (USA) and classified as a 1A school by the UIL. It is part of the Glasscock County Independent School District located in central Glasscock County. Garden City High School was recognized as one of 25 Blue Ribbon Schools in the state of Texas for 2011. In 2015, the school was rated "Met Standard" by the Texas Education Agency.

The school district includes all of Glasscock County.

== Athletics ==
The Garden City Bearkats compete in these sports -

Cross Country, 6-Man Football, Basketball, Golf, Tennis & Track

=== State Titles ===
- Football -
  - 2009(6M/D1), 2010(6M/D1)
- Girls Track -
  - 1975(B), 2023(1A)
- Boys Golf
  - 2018(1A), 2019(1A), 2026(1A)
- Girls Golf
  - 2024(1A), 2025(1A)

==== State Finalists ====
- Girls Basketball -
  - 2007(1A/D1)

== Academics ==
- UIL Academic Meet Champions
  - 2006(1A)
