= Lorenzo de Zavala =

Mexican and Texan politician (1788–1836)

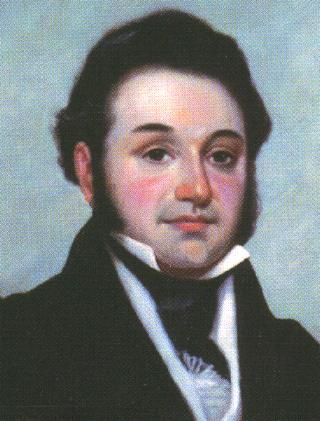

Vice President of the Republic of Texas
- Interim
- In office 16 March 1836 – 17 October 1836
- President: David G. Burnet
- Preceded by: Office established
- Succeeded by: Mirabeau B. Lamar

Governor of the State of Mexico
- In office 15 August 1831 – 1 December 1832
- President: Melchor Múzquiz
- Succeeded by: Félix María Aburou
- In office 8 March 1826 – 19 April 1826
- President: Melchor Múzquiz
- Succeeded by: Mariano Esteva y Ulibarri

Secretary of Finance of the United Mexican States
- In office 18 April 1829 – 2 November 1829
- President: Francisco Moctezuma
- Succeeded by: José María Bocanegra

Representative for Yucatán in the Congress of Deputies of Spain
- In office 1820–1822

Personal details
- Born: October 3, 1788 Tecoh, Yucatán, Viceroyalty of New Spain
- Died: November 15, 1836 (aged 48) Channelview, Republic of Texas

Manuel Lorenzo Justiniano de Zavala y Sáenz (October 3, 1788 – November 15, 1836), known simply as Lorenzo de Zavala, as a Mexican and later Tejano medical doctor, politician, diplomat and author. Born in Yucatán under Spanish rule, he was closely involved in drafting the constitution for the First Federal Republic of Mexico in 1824 after Mexico won independence from Spain. Years later, he also helped in drafting a constitution for Mexico's rebellious enemy at the time, the Republic of Texas, to secure independence from Mexico in 1836. Zavala was said to have had a keen intellect and was fluent in multiple languages.

Zavala was one of the most prominent liberals in the era of the First Republic. Since his youth, Zavala was an indefatigable believer in the principle of democratic representative government. As a young man he founded several newspapers and wrote extensively, espousing democratic reforms — writings which led to his imprisonment by the Spanish crown. While imprisoned, he learned English and studied medicine; after his release, he practiced medicine for two years before entering politics.

Over his career, he served in many different capacities including the Spanish Cortes (legislature) in Madrid representing Yucatán, and in Mexico's Senate. He became Mexico's Minister of Finance and served as Ambassador to France and Governor of the State of Mexico. In 1829, a conservative coup brought Anastasio Bustamante to power, and Zavala was forced into exile, moving to the United States for two years. He wrote a book about U.S. political culture during this time and also traveled extensively in Europe. With his diplomatic experience and linguistic skills, Zavala was well received by foreign governments.

In 1832, a liberal coup brought Valentín Gómez Farías to power. Zavala returned to Mexico and was appointed as Minister to France. While serving in Paris, Zavala witnessed overthrow of Gomez Farias and the subsequent fall of the First Mexican Republic. Santa Anna was in the process of setting up the Centralist Republic of Mexico, replacing the Mexican Constitution that Zavala himself had helped write. Zavala resigned his position in protest and spoke out against Santa Anna. Zavala and his family fled in the middle of night from a large hacienda with servants to Texas, which like many Mexican provinces at the time, was rebelling against Santa Anna and the centralist constitution which intended to strip Mexican provinces of their autonomy. Zavala eventually became an advocate of Texas independence, helped in the drafting of the Constitution of the Republic of Texas, and served as vice president until he resigned due to failing health.

Zavala's legacy in Mexico remains controversial with historians recognizing his political and intellectual work, his important role in the early history of the nation, while still branding him a traitor for helping the Texans secede from Mexico. Conversely, Texans consider him a founding father and state hero. In modern-day Texas, both a county and a city are named in his honor, as well as many schools and public buildings including the Texas State Archives and Library Building in Austin.

== Early life and education ==
Zavala was born on October 3, 1788, in the town of Tecoh, Yucatán, Zavala's parents were criollos, Spanish Basques born in Mexico. Zavala was a third-generation Yucatecan. His grandfather moved to the Yucatán peninsula from Peru. Zavala's father, born in 1725, was a notary— a legal representative in Spanish-speaking countries.

Zavala was educated in Mérida, Yucatán's provincial capital, in the Tridentine Seminary of San Ildefonso. There he studied the standard curriculum of Latin, morals, scholastic theology, and classical philosophy. After graduation, he founded a newspaper called The Universal Critic (El Aristarco Universal) and wrote for several newspapers in which he espoused democratic ideas that would remain the pillars of his later political career. His writings were critical of the Spanish officials, and he was imprisoned at age 26 for three years by the Spanish Crown (1814–1817). While incarcerated, Zavala learned the English language and studied medical textbooks to an extent that qualified him to practice medicine upon his release. He practiced medicine for two years, then political events compelled him to return to politics.

== Career ==
Zavala began his political career becoming secretary of the local government of his home state of Yucatán, which created opportunities leading to his later election to the Cortes (legislature) in Madrid representing Yucatán as its governor. After México won independence from Spain in 1821, Zavala resigned his position in Madrid and returned to Mexico, where he was elected to the newly formed national congress, again representing Yucatán. Zavala became part of a group to draft the constitution of the Federal Republic of Mexico. In 1824, he was elected as President of the Constituent Congress and was the first to sign the Mexican Federal Constitution of 1824. He served in the Mexican Senate from 1824 to 1826. He was appointed Minister of Finance in 1829, but served only 6 months before the government was overthrown and Zavala was placed under house arrest. He fled to the United States entering a self-imposed exile.

=== Exile ===
During his exile Zavala, ever the scholar, wrote a book called Journey to the United States of North America, a travel narrative similar to Alexis de Tocqueville's Democracy in America, although Zavala's book preceded de Tocqueville's work by a year. Zavala traveled in the northeast U.S. and wrote about U.S. political system and culture from a Mexican point of view. The book was mainly a panegyric, but did point out the hypocrisy of the U.S. for allowing slavery despite professing lofty ideals of freedom. His other notable writing was a two-volume history of Mexico, entitled Historical essay of the Revolutions of Mexico from 1808 to 1830 ("Ensayo Histórico de las Revoluciones de México de 1808 hasta 1830"). He lived in New York, but spent several months in England and France. Zavala's keen mind and his command of Spanish, English, French made him popular abroad. He was made a member of the Geographical and Scientific Society of France and was a received by the Court of St. James's in England.

=== Renunciation of President López de Santa Anna ===
His exile ended in 1832 when he returned to Mexico to serve as governor of the State of México, located just west of Mexico City. (It is one of 32 individual states in Mexico and does not refer to the entire country). He was appointed as Minister to France by then President Antonio López de Santa Anna. While serving in this capacity in Paris, Zavala became increasingly aware that President López de Santa Anna, backed by military force and the clergy, was assuming dictatorial powers and was not observing the Mexican Constitution of 1824 that Zavala had helped create. In protest, Zavala resigned his post in France and renounced López de Santa Anna, who then ordered Zavala to return to Mexico City. Zavala, for his own safety, moved his family to Texas where he owned land.

=== Move to Texas ===
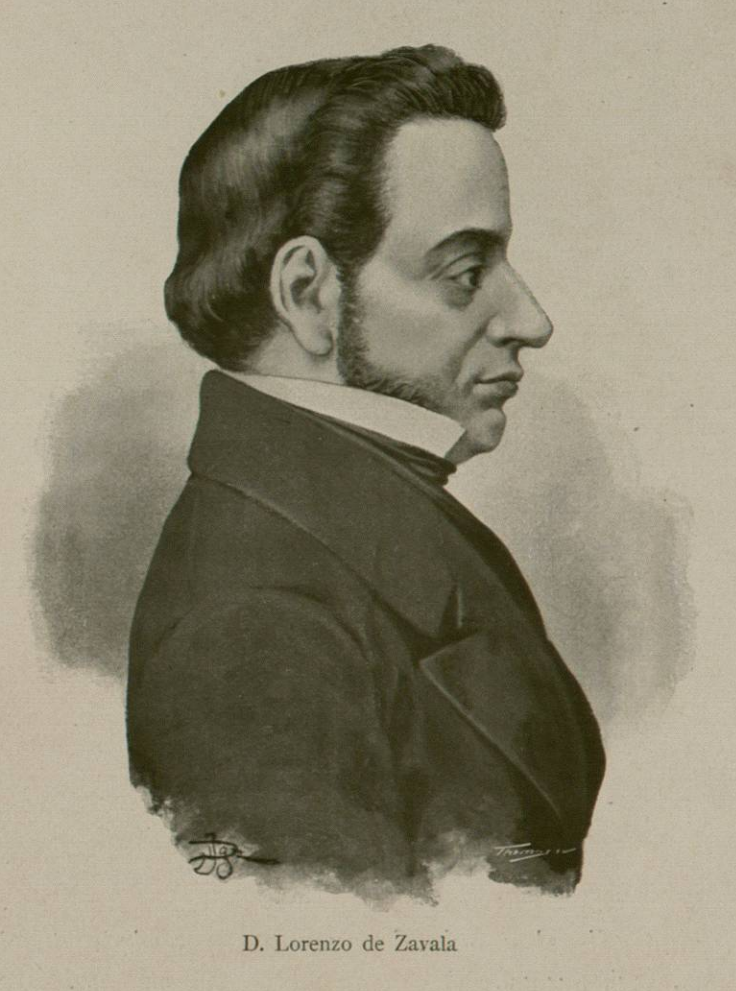
Lorenzo de Zavala in México, su evolución social by Justo Sierra

He arrived in Texas in 1835 by steamboat near the mouth of the Brazos River and briefly shared a house with his good friend Stephen F. Austin who would later be called "the Father of Texas". Other than Austin, the only other Texan he knew before arriving was David G. Burnet who later became Interim President of Texas. Zavala had known Burnet in New York. Both men had been given Empresario Grants in prior years. These grants were designed by the Mexican Government to encourage new settlers to come to Texas from around the world, the hope being to create a buffer zone between Mexico and the U.S. and also to help deal with the hostile Indians in the region. The owner of a grant was given immense tracts of Texas land in exchange for recruiting and being responsible for a certain quota of new settlers—in Zavala's case, 500 families. Zavala and Burnet had sold their grants to groups of investors in New York.

The previous summer, Zavala had bought a home on 177 acres (equal to one labor, a Spanish term of land measurement) north of Buffalo Bayou in Harris County, called Zavala Point. This border area contained many immigrants from the United States who were accustomed to a democratic government and individual rights. Animosity against López de Santa Anna's rule was common and rebellion was brewing. López de Santa Anna was angered by what he perceived to be U.S. interference in Mexican affairs, and set about to stop the rebellion by dispatching troops.

At this point, Zavala's hope was to overthrow the existing Mexican government and restore Mexico to a democracy and to have Texas be one of the Mexican states. Before long, he realized that this was not going to happen. A pragmatic realist, he gradually changed his viewpoint and began advocating for Texas independence from Mexico. Despite orders from López de Santa Anna for Zavala to be captured and deported from Texas, Zavala was never in real danger—he had become a valuable ally with influential Texans seeking independence. His legislative experience, linguistic skills, and diplomatic experience made him ideally suited for drafting the new Constitution of the Republic of Texas, not to mention that he was the only one among them with actual experience in drafting such a document.

In March 1836, a meeting of delegates was held in a Texas settlement known as "Washington-on-the-Brazos" where the Declaration of Independence for the Republic of Texas was drafted and signed. Zavala personally helped write the new constitution and served as vice president under the provisional government. He had a role in the design of a flag for Texas at the March 1836 convention, though no flag was made official and Zavala's original design is not precisely known; it is usually depicted as a blue field with a centered white star with the letters TEXAS around it, though the lettering is known to be an addition by Charles Stanfield Taylor. While working, the delegates received a message that the Alamo was under siege. After the Alamo fell, López de Santa Anna's forces were soon advancing on the delegation, forcing them to flee. When López de Santa Anna's troops approached Zavala's Point, Zavala and his family fled down the San Jacinto River to the home of William Scott, one of the Empressario Grant colonists. A number of families awaited there for a steamer to take them to safety on Galveston Island. Nearby, in Harris County, López de Santa Anna's army faced Texas General Sam Houston's forces on April 21, 1836 at the Battle of San Jacinto. López de Santa Anna was defeated and captured.

A few months after this, Zavala's health began to fail. He resigned his office of vice president on October 17, 1836 and returned home. Less than a month after his resignation, he was boating in Buffalo Bayou when his rowboat overturned and he was chilled. Zavala developed pneumonia and died at his home on November 15, 1836. He was buried in a small cemetery plot at his home. The grave was later moved to the San Jacinto Battleground Park.

== Personal life ==
In 1807 Zavala married Teresa Correa y Corres. They had three children: a son named Lorenzo Jr., a daughter named Manuela, and a daughter who died at age one. Zavala's wife, Teresa, died in the spring of 1831. Zavala remarried while in exile. He married Emily West in New York on November 12, 1831, at the Church of the Transfiguration. To this union was born a son and two daughters. Augustine, the eldest son of his marriage to Emily, was the father of Adina Emilia De Zavala, who played a role in the fight to preserve the Alamo as a historic structure for future generations.

=== Freemasons ===
Zavala and his friends secretly organized the first Masonic Lodge in Yucatán, the Reunión a la Virtud lodge No. 9. The lodge received its charter from the Louisiana Grand Lodge in 1817. It was Zavala's relationship with his fellow masonic brothers and to other lodges that allowed him to gather many political connections prior to Mexico's Independence. Zavala was one of the key people that helped establish the York Rite Masonry in Mexico in 1826 as an alternative to the older, well established Scottish rite (Escocés). That same year the Grand Lodge of New York issued charters to five Masonic Lodges in Mexico City. These five lodges became the nucleus of the movement that favored decentralization of leadership. Zavala became the Charter Master of Independencia Lodge No. 454. He kept his position until his exile in 1830. He is listed as a "Masonic Hero" by the Grand Lodge of Texas. Some sources state that Zavala was disgraced for revealing ritual secrets.

== Legacy ==
Zavala remains a controversial figure in Mexico, with historians generally commending Zavala's liberalism, while denouncing his support of Texan independence as treason. Mexican historian Francisco Bulnes characterized Zavala as a traitor, while defending Zavala against the charge that he supported Texan independence for political or financial advantages, arguing that it was his opposition to centralism and especially to Santa Anna that proved the decisive factor. Biographer Francisco Sosa wrote that Zavala ceased to be Mexican when he became a representative for Harrisburg, and that "what he did after [voting for Texan independence] was but a consequence of that step taken in a moment of blindness caused by a political hatred which had hurled him into an abyss." Zavala’s criticisms against Santa Anna were influential for the founders of the Texas Revolution. Texas Revolutionaries used Zavala’s ideas to describe their new nation.

The town of Zavala, Texas was named for him in Jasper County in 1834. The town no longer exists, but there is a village about 20 miles away in Angelina County named Zavalla (spelled differently) which is also named for Lorenzo de Zavala. In 1858, 22 years after Zavala's death, the Texas Legislature named Zavala County in his honor. Zavala County is in southern Texas, and sits roughly in a triangle formed by Del Rio, Laredo, and San Antonio. The county seat is Crystal City. When the name was given, it was misspelled as "Zavalla" and the error was not officially corrected until 71 years later (1929). Currently, his name appears on many public buildings and schools, including the Texas State Library and Archives Commission in Austin. The National Hispanic Institute named its Lorenzo de Zavala Youth Legislative Session program (colloquially known as the "LDZ," now hosted at five universities across the U.S. and one in Panama) for him.

== Texas Historical Commission Sites ==
In 1936, the Texas Historical Commission acknowledged the 1835 Harrisburg settlement of Lorenzo de Zavalla with a Texas Centennial Marker made of gray granite with a bronze inscription.

In 1968, the Texas Historical Commission established a historical marker at the De Zavala Elementary School in Southeast Houston. The supplemental commemorative plaque preserves an inscription regarding the passage of Texas historical sites at the San Jacinto State Historic Landmark.

=== Namesakes ===
Namesakes of Lorenzo de Zavala

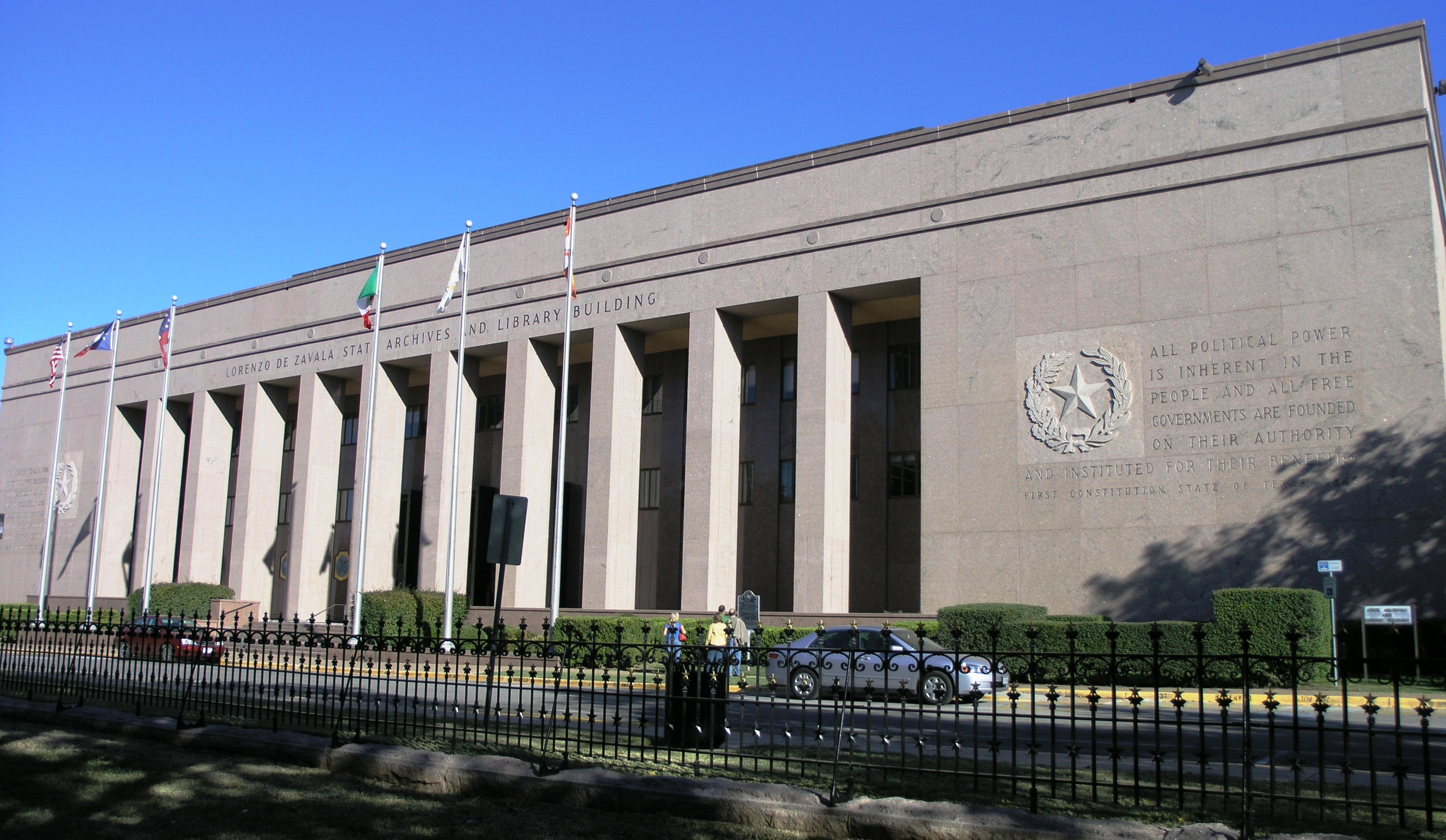
The Lorenzo de Zavala State Archives and Library Building in downtown Austin, which houses the headquarters of the Texas State Library and Archives Commission

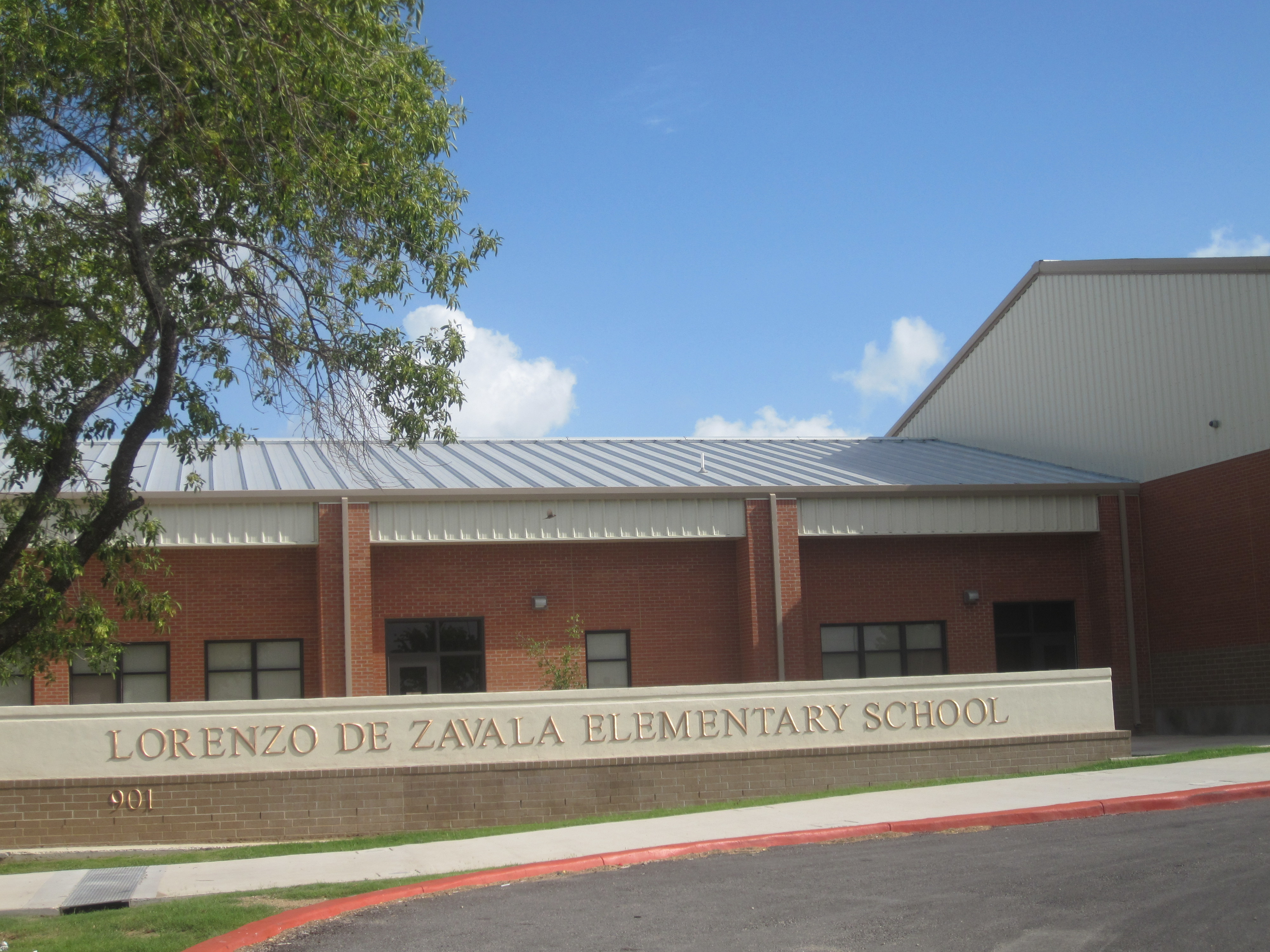
Lorenzo de Zavala Elementary School in Crystal City, Texas

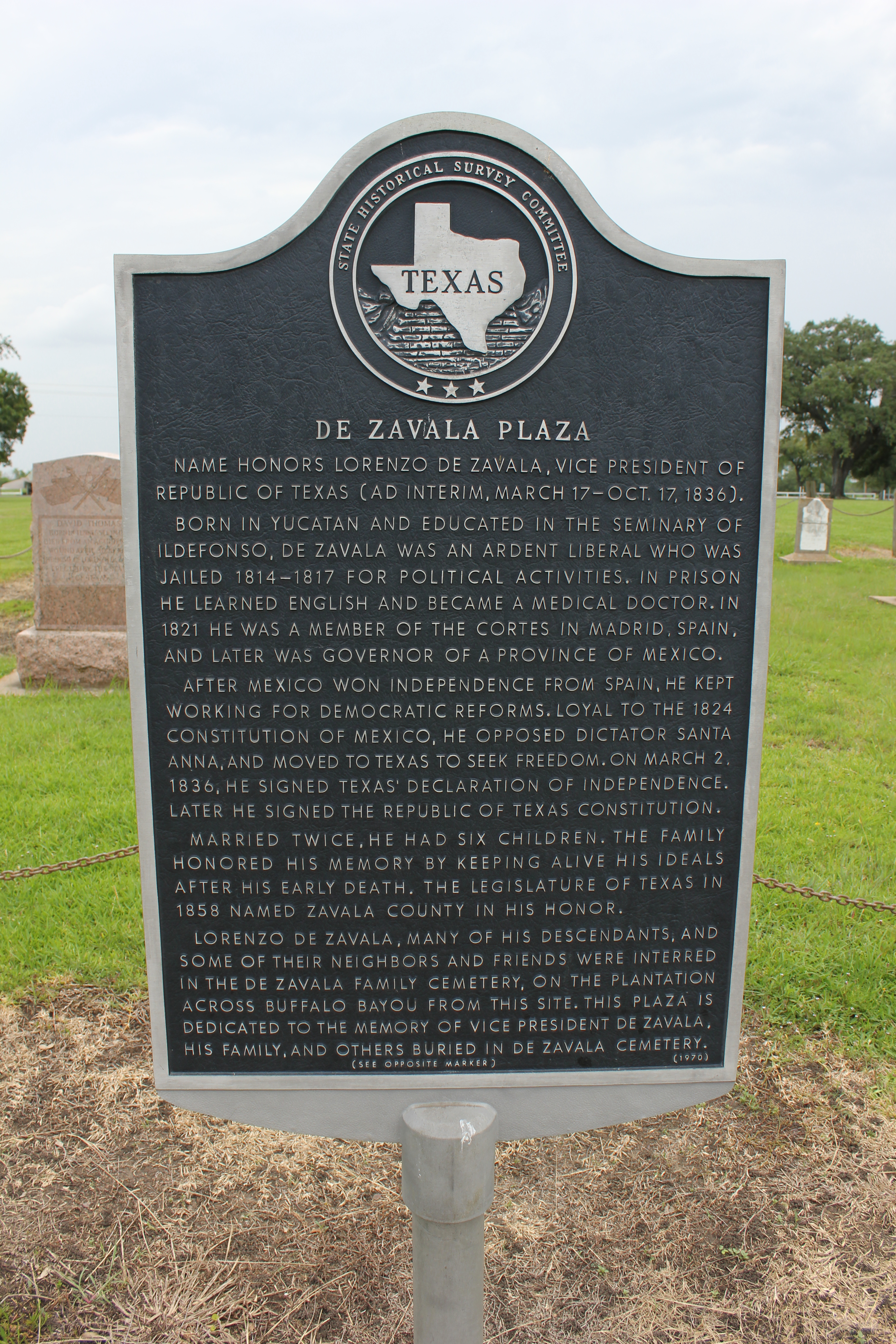
Texas Historical Marker in De Zavala Plaza, Harris County, Texas

== Schools ==
- Lorenzo de Zavala Elementary School, Baytown, Texas
- Lorenzo de Zavala Elementary School, San Marcos, Texas
- De Zavala Elementary, Channelview, Texas
- Lorenzo de Zavala Elementary School, Crystal City, Texas
- Lorenzo de Zavala Elementary School, Dallas, Texas
- Zavala Elementary School, El Paso, Texas
- Lorenzo de Zavala Elementary School, Fort Worth, Texas
- Lorenzo de Zavala Elementary School, Grand Prairie, Texas
- Lorenzo de Zavala Elementary School, Harlingen Texas
- Lorenzo de Zavala Elementary School, Houston, Texas (Magnolia Park Neighborhood
- Lorenzo de Zavala Elementary School, Midland, Texas
- Lorenzo de Zavala Elementary School, San Antonio, Texas
- Lorenzo de Zavala Middle School, Amarillo, Texas
- Lorenzo de Zavala Middle School, Irving, Texas
- Lorenzo de Zavala Middle School, La Joya, Texas
- Lorenzo de Zavala Environmental Science Academy, Grand Prairie, Texas
- Zavala Elementary School, Austin, Texas

== Other things named for Lorenzo de Zavala ==
- Zavala County, Texas
- De Zavala Rd, a major thoroughfare in San Antonio, Texas
- Lorenzo De Zavala Lodge #1397, Masonic Lodge, Houston, Texas
- City of Zavalla, Texas
- Lorenzo de Zavala Texas State Library and Archives Commission, Austin, Texas
- Lorenzo de Zavala Youth Legislative Session, National Hispanic Institute (with programs in San Antonio, Texas; Rochester, New York; San Diego, California; Fort Collins, Colorado; Joliet, Illinois; and Panama City, Panama)
- Zavala Hispanic Cultural Initiative (Non-Profit organization promoting education, art and culture in Wichita Falls, Texas)
- Lorenzo de Zavala middle school in Amarillo, Texas
