= Bradley Tippett =

Australian baseball player (born 1988)

Bradley James Tippett (born 11 February 1988 in Mona Vale, New South Wales) is an Australian former professional baseball pitcher who had played the Minnesota Twins organisation, until he went through surgery in his right arm, removing a rib that was blocking an artery every time he went to pitch.

== Career ==
Tippett debuted as a professional with the GCL Twins in 2006, going 3–5 with 10 saves and a 2.53 ERA. Despite playing on a sub-.500 team, Brad managed to lead the Gulf Coast League in saves. He was 7–1 with 3 saves and a 0.93 ERA in 21 games for 2007 with the Elizabethton Twins, helping them to an Appalachian League title. Opponents hit just .155 and no left-handed hitter reached safely all season (in 36 AB). Tippett was tied for second in the League in wins even though he was solely out of the bullpen. Baseball America ranked him as the league's No. 18 prospect.

Tippett made his Claxton Shield debut in the 2008 Claxton Shield, throwing three hitless innings. He was added to the Australia national baseball team for the 2008 Final Olympic Qualification Tournament and was 1–0 with a 4.50 ERA in that qualifying, during which Australia failed to earn a spot in the 2008 Olympics.
