= Henry Millard =

Henry Millard (circa 1796– 1844) was an American businessman, military officer, and public servant. He founded the city of Beaumont, Texas, in 1835 and fought in the Battle of San Jacinto in 1836 during the Texas Revolution.

== Early life ==
Millard was born in Stillwater, New York, to Josiah and Nancy (Tower) Millard in about 1796. In 1804 his family moved to Ste. Genevieve, Missouri, and then downriver in the 1820s to Natchez, Mississippi.

On August 24, 1826, Millard married Mary Dewburleigh Barlace Warren Beaumont, the daughter of William Henry Beaumont and Elizabeth (Duncan) Beaumont of Natchez.

The Millards' first son, Frederick Sipe Millard, was born in 1827. That same year the father opened a store with his brother-in-law, Franklin Beaumont. They sold medicine, toy trains, books, and stationery.

In 1832 Millard moved his family to New Orleans, where he started a drug firm with a man named Samuel Mason. Mason died in 1833, which caused difficulties for the firm. During that same year Millard's second son, Henry Beaumont Millard, was born. Millard's wife Mary died in 1834.

Millard formed a new partnership with Joseph Pulsifer and Thomas Huling.

== Texas ==
Millard left his sons with foster parents in New Orleans and moved to Texas in 1835. He and his business partner Pulsifer opened a store in the settlement of Santa Anna, while the third partner, Huling, opened a store in Zavala.

The three of them decided to invest in land. They purchased 50 acres (200,000 m^{2}) of land between the settlements of Tevis Bluff and Santa Anna. On that land they laid out the town of Beaumont, which Millard apparently named after Jefferson Beaumont. As a delegate to the Consultation of 1835 in San Felipe, he helped found the municipality of Jefferson, which later became Jefferson County. He was elected to the General Council of the Consultation, but resigned in order to accept a commission as a lieutenant colonel in the Texas revolutionary army.

=== Military career ===
At first, Millard acted as a recruiting officer in Nacogdoches, Texas. Then in 1836 he went with General Sam Houston to a conference with the Cherokee people. A short time later he took command of a battalion and marched them to San Jacinto, where they fought on April 21, 1836, in the successful battle against the Mexican forces under President Antonio Lopez de Santa Anna.

In his report of the battle, Houston wrote

The artillery under the special command of Col. Geo. W. Hockley Inspector Gen'l. was placed on the right of the first Regiment; and four companies of Infantry under the command of Lieut Col. Henry Millard, sustained the artillery upon the right.

After the battle, Houston gave Millard two pistols that had belonged to Santa Anna. Millard’s descendants later loaned them to the Republic of Texas Museum where they reside today.

=== Public service ===
Millard acted as the chief justice of Jefferson County from 1838-1840. He was an alderman for the city of Beaumont and a justice of the peace. In 1842 he moved to Galveston, Texas, to explore new business possibilities and became the tax assessor for Galveston County.

== Death and legacy ==
Millard suffered a series of illnesses and died on August 28 or 29, 1844. His remains were buried in the Episcopal Cemetery on Broadway.

An historical marker outlining the life of Millard was dedicated in 1991 in the city of Beaumont. It is located at 800 Pearl Street. At the Battleground Golf Course in Deer Park, Texas, the thirteenth hole is named "Millard" in his honor.
