= Texas State Library and Archives Commission =

Texas archival agency

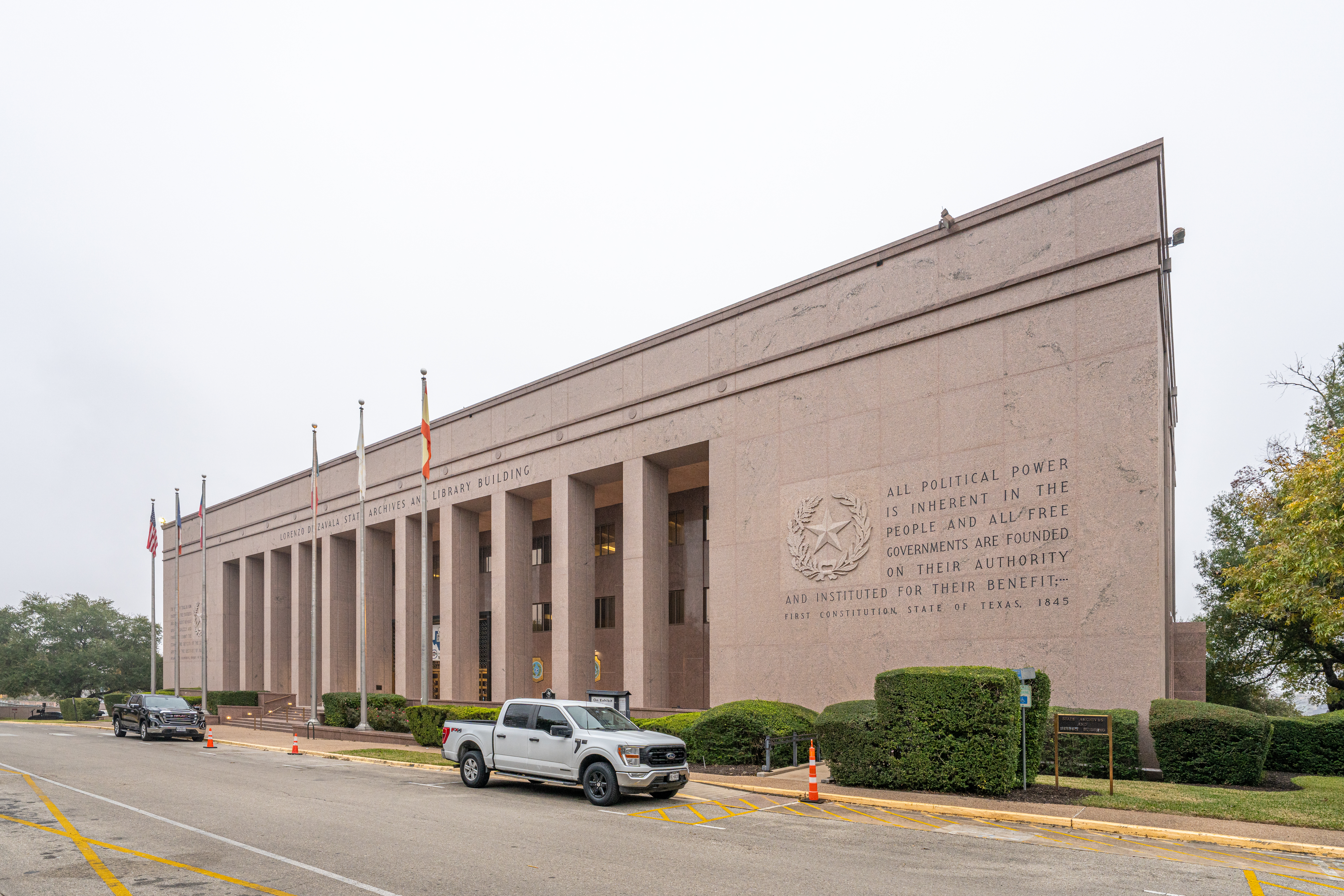
The Lorenzo de Zavala State Archives and Library Building in downtown Austin, which houses the headquarters of the Texas State Library and Archives Commission

The Texas State Library and Archives Commission (TSLAC) refers to the state government agency in the state of Texas that supports the reading, learning, and historical preservation needs of Texas and its people. The agency is charged with preserving the archival record of Texas, supporting research, and making primary resources available to the public; assisting public, academic, and school libraries across the state in meeting the needs of their communities and students; helping public agencies maintain their public records; and supporting the reading needs of thousands of Texans with disabilities preventing them from reading a standard book.

The Lorenzo de Zavala State Archives and Library Building, located at 1201 Brazos Street in the Capitol Complex in Downtown Austin, houses the State Archives, a library reference collection, two public reading rooms for researchers, a lobby exhibit gallery, and administrative offices.

The State Records Center and Talking Book Circulation Department, located in north central Austin, houses the State and Local Records Management Division and the Talking Book Program Division's circulation department; the State Records Center Annex at Promontory Point in Austin provides additional storage space for state and local records; and the Sam Houston Regional Library and Research Center, located near Liberty, Texas, preserves records from the Southeast Texas Atascosito region, hosts researchers in its library and research room, and houses a museum about the region featuring permanent historical exhibits and rotating items from its collections.

The current Texas State Librarian is Gloria Meraz, appointed by the Texas State Library and Archives Commission on August 27, 2021. Meraz is the first person of color and first Hispanic woman to serve as State Librarian of Texas since the position was created in 1909. She succeeded previous Texas State Librarian, Mark Smith.

== History ==
The Texas State Library was originally established as the National Library of the Republic of Texas on 24 January 1839 by a joint resolution of the Third Congress of the Republic of Texas. $10,000 was designated for its use, though the ongoing bankruptcy of the Republic meant that no more than $250, spent on a set of encyclopedias, was used during this initial phase of development.

After the annexation of Texas to the United States in 1848, legislation was passed requiring copies of all important state-related documents to be transported to the Library of Congress, other US state seats, or foreign powers, as deemed necessary. During this time, the Secretary of the State of Texas was to act as the state librarian. In 1854 an act was passed creating a separate library for the Supreme Court of Texas, and in 1855 $5000 was appropriated for the purchase of books for the State Library, though any major work done on the library was postponed until after the American Civil War.

The office of State Librarian was officially established after the Civil War, and Robert Josselyn was the first appointment. The expenses pertaining to running or more fully establishing the library were seen as detrimental to the project of Reconstruction, however, and the library was again placed at the hands of the state department until 1876, when The Department of Insurance, Statistics, and History was established.

The commissioner of this department was in charge of the State Library, and from 1877 to 1880 a large number of documents, including the Nacogdoches Archives, were transferred to the State Library. On 9 November 1881 a massive fire destroyed the Texas Capitol Building, where the library was housed, and ruined much of the collection.

In 1891 construction of the present Capitol building was completed, and Governor James S. Hogg created the office of historical clerk, adding a Spanish translator and an archivist to the staff two years later. In 1902 a Texas Library Association was organized, aided by the Texas Federation of Women's Clubs, and in 1909 legislation was obtained for the organization of the Texas State Library and Historical Commission (now the Texas State Library and Archives Commission).

Not until 1957, when Gov. Marion Price Daniel Sr. went before the Fifty-fifth Legislature and recommended that a building specifically for the State Library be erected, was there adequate housing for the growing collection.

The present building, named for Lorenzo de Zavala, was dedicated on April 10, 1962. Built of granite from the same quarry that supplied materials for the Texas State Capitol, the outer walls are made of sunset red granite. The building is 257 feet long, 77 feet wide, and 60 feet tall. It has five main floors and seven stack floors (the stacks are not open to the public). The library collections available to the public include federal documents distributed by the U.S. Government Printing Office, Texas state agency publications, and publications about Texas history and government, as well as a significant collection of Texana and other related titles. The Texas State Archives preserves and documents the heritage and culture of Texas by identifying, collecting, and making available for research the permanently valuable official records of Texas government, as well as other significant historical resources. Maintaining the official history of Texas government, the State Archives includes archival government records dating back to the 18th century, as well as newspapers, journals, books, manuscripts, photographs, historical maps, and other historical resources. By these records, all three branches of Texas government are accountable to the people. Taken together, the holdings of the Texas State Archives provide a historical foundation for present-day governmental actions and are an important resource for Texas studies.

== See also ==
- List of libraries in the United States
