= Craig Glassock =

Australian cricketer (born 1973)

Personal information
- Born: 29 November 1973 (age 52); Mona Vale, New South Wales, Australia
- Source: ESPNcricinfo, 30 December 2016

Craig Glassock (born 29 November 1973) is an Australian cricketer. He played four first-class and one List A match for New South Wales between 1994/95 and 1997/98.

Prior to his senior career, Glassock was part of the New South Wales Under-19 team during the 1992-93 season

== See also ==
- List of New South Wales representative cricketers
