= Glasscock County Courthouse =

- Glasscock County Courthouse and Jail
- U.S. National Register of Historic Places
- Texas State Antiquities Landmark
- Recorded Texas Historic Landmark
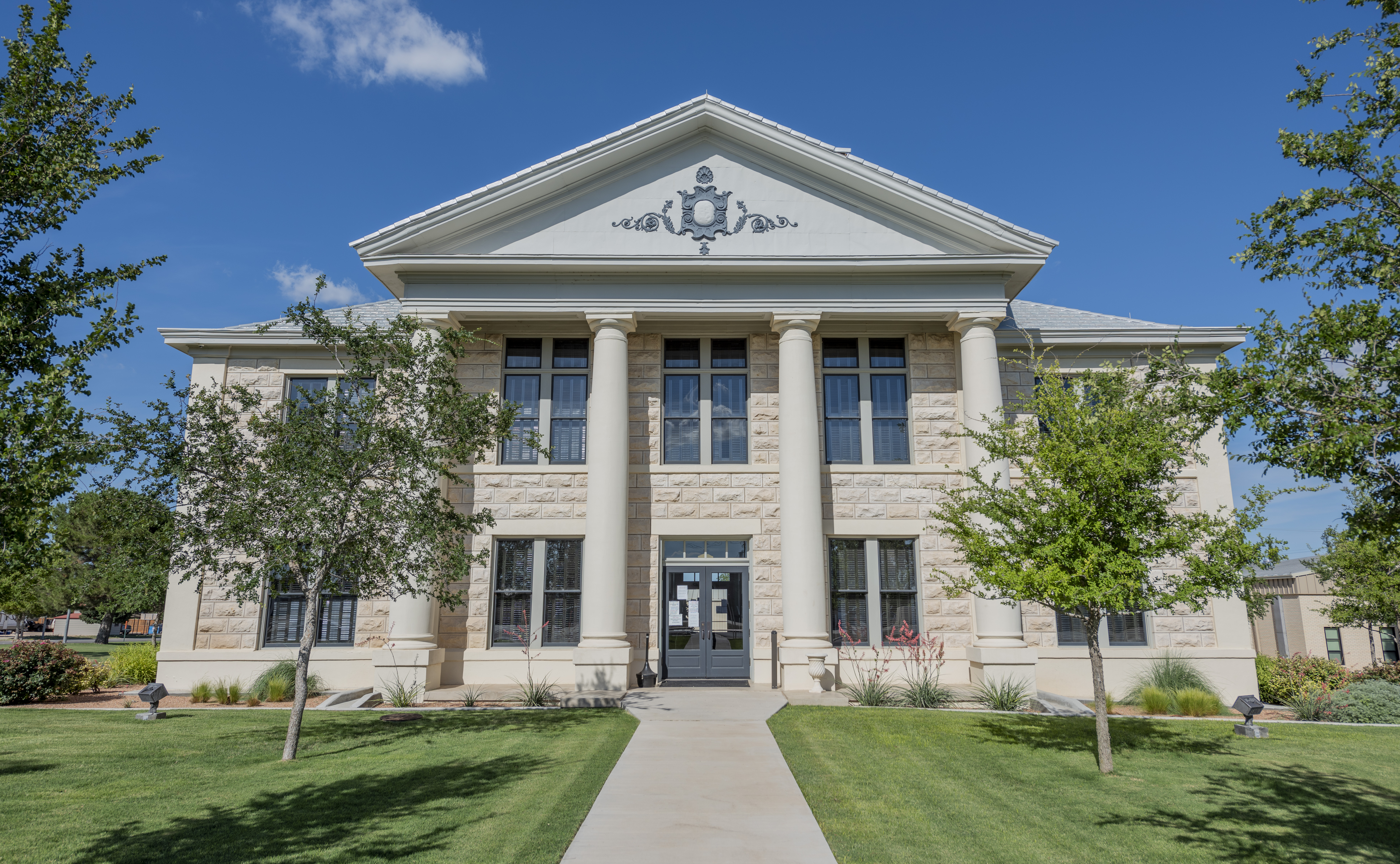
- Current 1910 courthouse building

- Location within Texas Location within the United States
- Interactive map showing the location of Glasscock County Courthouse
- Location: 117 E. Currie St., Garden City, Texas
- Coordinates: 31°51′49″N 101°28′49″W
- Area: less than one acre
- Built: 1894
- Built by: Mutual Construction Co., Louisville, Kentucky
- Architect: L.T. Noyes, Edward C. Hosford, Leslie L. Thurmon
- Architectural style: Classical Revival
- NRHP reference No.: 11000129
- TSAL No.: 8200003233
- RTHL No.: 2188

Significant dates
- Added to NRHP: March 21, 2011
- Designated TSAL: January 1, 2012
- Designated RTHL: 1993

The Glasscock County Courthouse is an historic courthouse building located in Garden City, Glasscock County, Texas. Built in 1909 to 1910 at a cost of $28,000, it was designed by Georgia-born American architect Edward Columbus Hosford, who is noted for the courthouses and other buildings that he designed in Florida, Georgia and Texas. It was built of granite and rusticated stone with gable front porticoes on all sides, each of which is supported by four 2-story Doric columns. Unlike the Mason County Courthouse also designed by Hosford and built at the same time for $39,786, the Glasscock County Courthouse has no clock tower cupola in the center of its roof and its side porticoes are smaller than the other two.

The prior courthouse, a small 2-story stone building, still stands on the property. It was used as a jail after the present courthouse was built but is now closed.

== See also ==
- National Register of Historic Places listings in Glasscock County, Texas
- List of county courthouses in Texas
- Recorded Texas Historic Landmarks in Glasscock County
