= Thomas Byers Huling =

Thomas Byers Huling (October 19, 1804 – November 2, 1865) merchant and politician, son of Thomas and Rebecca (Berryhill) Huling, was born in Perry County, Pennsylvania, on October 19, 1804. After operating a steamboat business on the Mississippi River, he moved to Texas in 1834 and obtained a land grant on the south bank of the Angelina River in what later became Jasper County. A merchant and land speculator, Huling sold and transported provisions to Capt. James Chesser's locally raised unit during the Texas Revolution. He served as judge and postmaster after the war and owned the land on which Zavala was founded. Along with Henry Millard and Joseph Pulsifer, Thomas B. Huling helped lay out the original plans for Beaumont, Texas. Huling's first wife, known only as Sarah, apparently never came to Texas; she died in 1838, leaving him with one child. He was remarried in May 1839 to Elizabeth Bullock; this couple had eleven children. Huling represented Jasper County in the Fifth Congress of the republic, 1840–41. Seeking to stimulate the growth of the county, and especially his project at Zavala, he attempted unsuccessfully to persuade some sixty English families to colonize the area in 1847. Nonetheless, many of Huling's economic ventures paid high dividends; by 1850 he owned seventeen slaves and estimated the worth of his real property at $100,000. In 1855 he moved to the Sulphur Fork of the Lampasas River. He died on November 2, 1865, and was buried in the Old Huling-Anderson Cemetery in the Lampasas cemetery.

Huling also owned the land upon which the former town of Zavala, Texas, was founded.
