= Garden City, Texas =

Census-designated place in and county seat to Glasscock County, Texas, United States

- Census-designated place
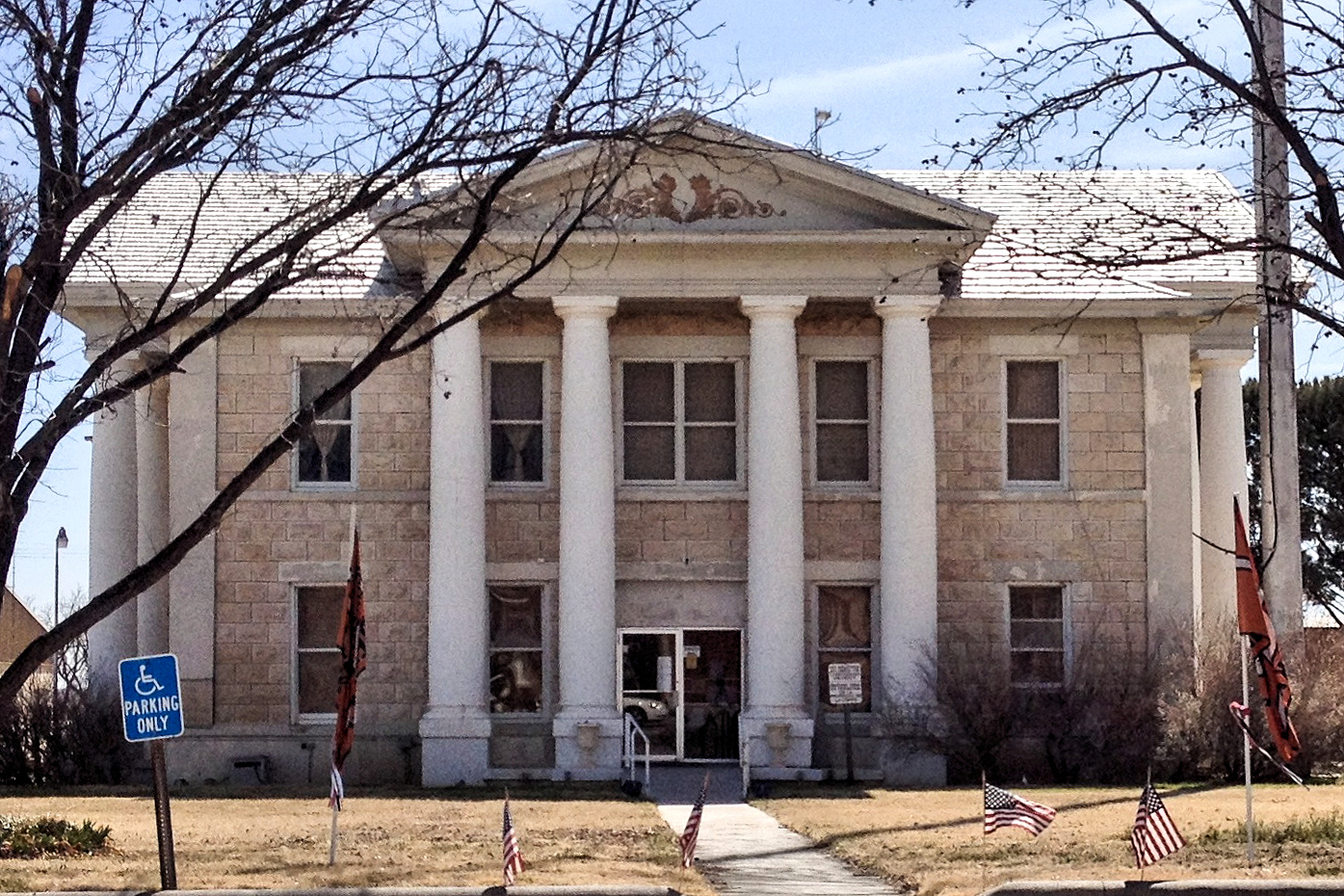
- Glasscock County Courthouse in Garden City

- Location within Texas Location within the United States
- Coordinates: 31°51′50″N 101°28′52″W
- Country: United States
- State: Texas
- County: Glasscock

Area
  - Total: 1.8 sq mi (4.6 km^{2})
  - Land: 1.8 sq mi (4.6 km^{2})
  - Water: 0 sq mi (0.0 km^{2})

Population (2020)
  - Total: 334
  - Density: 189/sq mi (72.9/km^{2})
- Time zone: UTC-6 (Central (CST))
  - Summer (DST): UTC-5 (CDT)
- ZIP codes: 79739
- FIPS code: 48-28176
- GNIS feature ID: 1336388

Garden City is a census-designated place (CDP) in and county seat of Glasscock County, Texas, United States. It lies near the center of the county, 27 miles (43 km) south of Big Spring, and at the 2020 census had a population of 334. The ZIP code is 79739.

== History ==
Garden City's history began in 1886, when what became the town's post office was established in a general store, and a settlement began to develop in the area around the business. The post office was to be named after the store proprietor, a man named Gardner. However, after a clerical error by officials in Washington, the postal franchise was granted under the name "Garden" City.

Garden City was the first Texas community platted by renowned surveyor W. D. Twichell, a Minnesota native.

In 1893, Glasscock County was organized, and Garden City vied for the county seat along with two other area communities, New California and Dixie. New California was ultimately chosen as the county seat; it was located in a less flood-prone region with a readily accessible water supply. However, at the time of the county's organization, New California consisted of two dwellings and an equally sparse population, whereas Garden City boasted a school, the general store/post office, and several homes. In a unique compromise, most of Garden City's structures were placed on wheels and relocated to the New California site, and on April 5, 1893, the settlement was renamed Garden City. A two-story stone courthouse was constructed later that same year, followed by a new, larger courthouse in 1910 (with the former building remaining in use as the Glasscock County Jail).

Between 1927 and 1943, Garden City's population fluctuated between 100 and 250, and several businesses and a newspaper (the Garden City Gazette) had come and gone. By 1945, Garden City had eight businesses and a population of 200. In the 1950s, oil was discovered nearby, creating a bit of a boom for the area. While Garden City's population did not experience the spike that other West Texas oil boom towns had seen (the population peaked at 300 in 1968, many years after the boom had ended), it did increase the community's commerce, with the number of operating businesses almost doubling from 1947 to 1968. By 1980, the population had fallen to 293, a figure maintained until 2010, when that year's census counted 334 residents.

The area is conducive to wind power generation, as is much of West Texas, and several wind farms have been proposed for the area.

Limestone from the quarry of TexaStone in Garden City was donated in 2004 for establishment of the Stonehenge replica in Odessa, Texas.

== Demographics ==
Historical population
Census	Pop.	Note	%±
2010	334		—
2020	334		0.0%
U.S. Decennial Census; 1850–1900 1910; 1920 1930 1940; 1950 1960 1970; 1980 1990 2000; 2010 2020

Garden City first appeared as a census designated place in the 2010 U.S. census.

=== 2020 census ===
Garden City CDP, Texas – Racial and ethnic composition Note: the US Census treats Hispanic/Latino as an ethnic category. This table excludes Latinos from the racial categories and assigns them to a separate category. Hispanics/Latinos may be of any race.
Race / Ethnicity (NH = Non-Hispanic)	Pop 2010	Pop 2020	% 2010	% 2020
White alone (NH)	213	162	63.77%	48.50%
Black or African American alone (NH)	1	1	0.30%	0.30%
Native American or Alaska Native alone (NH)	1	0	0.30%	0.00%
Asian alone (NH)	0	0	0.00%	0.00%
Native Hawaiian or Pacific Islander alone (NH)	0	0	0.00%	0.00%
Other race alone (NH)	0	0	0.00%	0.00%
Mixed race or Multiracial (NH)	0	2	0.00%	0.60%
Hispanic or Latino (any race)	119	169	35.63%	50.60%
Total	334	334	100.00%	100.00%

As of the 2020 United States census, there were 334 people, 78 households, and 67 families residing in the CDP.

== Education ==
All parts of the county are in the Glasscock County Independent School District. Garden City is home to the district's Garden City High School, which has the Bearkats as its sports mascot.

All of Glasscock County is in the service area of Howard County Junior College District.

== Climate ==
According to the Köppen climate classification system, Garden City has a semiarid climate, BSk on climate maps.

== See also ==
- List of census-designated places in Texas
