= Glasscock County, Texas =

County in Texas, United States

- County
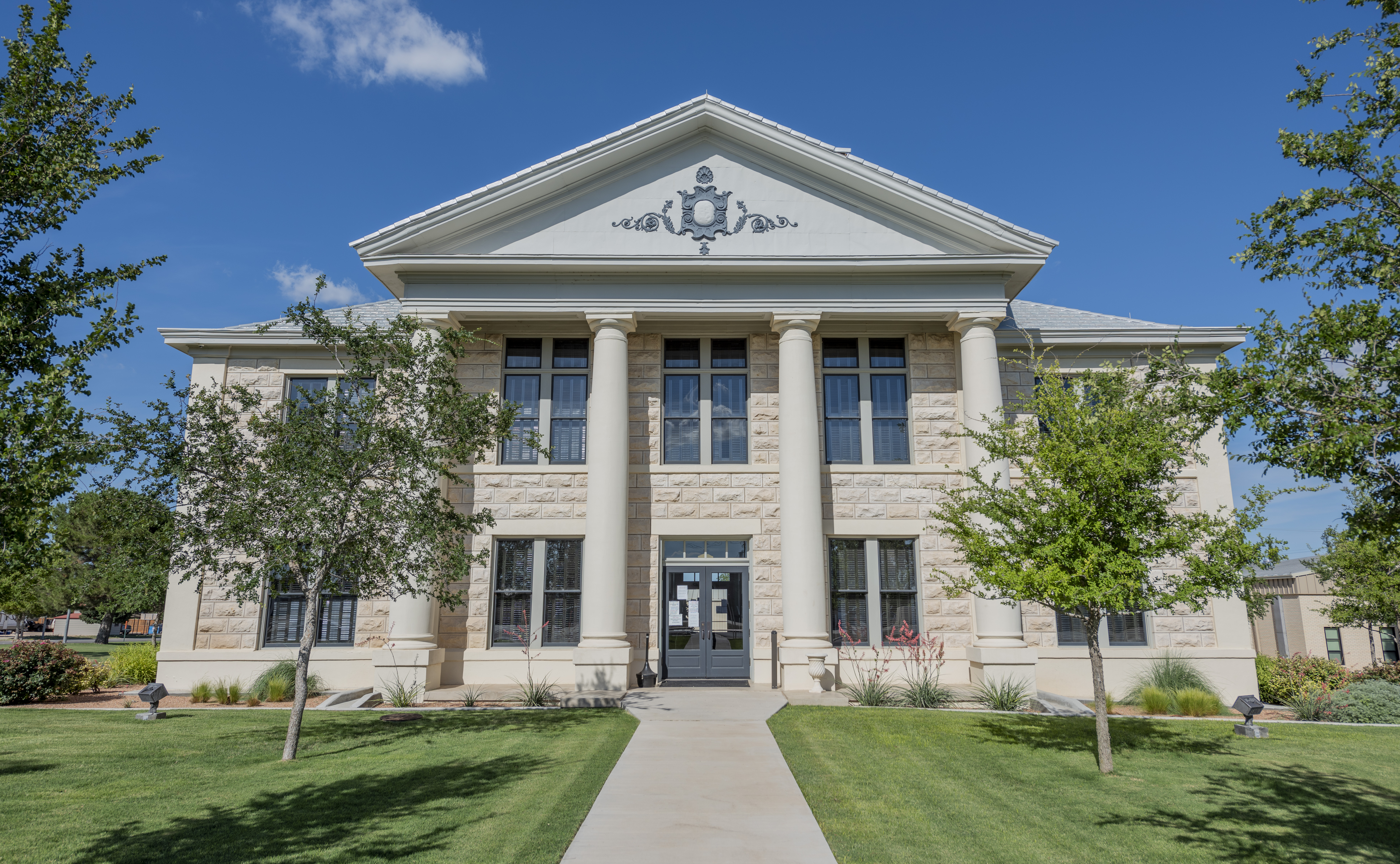
- Glasscock County Courthouse in Garden City

- Location within the U.S. state of Texas
- Coordinates: 31°52′N 101°32′W
- Country: United States
- State: Texas
- Founded: 1893
- Named for: George Washington Glasscock
- Seat: Garden City
- Largest community: Garden City

Area
  - Total: 901 sq mi (2,330 km^{2})
  - Land: 900 sq mi (2,300 km^{2})
  - Water: 0.9 sq mi (2.3 km^{2}) 0.1%

Population (2020)
  - Total: 1,116
  - Estimate (2025): 1,128 ▲
  - Density: 1.2/sq mi (0.48/km^{2})
- Time zone: UTC−6 (Central)
  - Summer (DST): UTC−5 (CDT)
- Congressional district: 11th
- Website: www.co.glasscock.tx.us

Glasscock County is a county located in the U.S. state of Texas. As of the 2020 census, its population was 1,116. Its county seat is Garden City. The county was created in 1827 and later organized in 1869. It is named for George Washington Glasscock, an early settler of the Austin, Texas area and the namesake of Georgetown, Texas.

Glasscock County is included in the Big Spring, TX Micropolitan Statistical Area.

== Geography ==
According to the U.S. Census Bureau, the county has a total area of 901 square miles (2,330 km^{2}), of which 900 square miles (2,300 km^{2}) is land and 0.9 square miles (2.3 km^{2}) (0.1%) is water. The Spraberry Trend, in 2009 the third-largest oil field in the United States by remaining reserves, underlies much of the county.

=== Major highways ===
- U.S. Highway 87
- State Highway 137
- State Highway 158
- Ranch to Market Road 33

=== Adjacent counties ===
- Howard County (north)
- Sterling County (east)
- Reagan County (south)
- Upton County (southwest)
- Midland County (west)
- Martin County (northwest)

== Demographics ==
Historical population
Census	Pop.	Note	%±
1890	208		—
1900	286		37.5%
1910	1,143		299.7%
1920	555		−51.4%
1930	1,263		127.6%
1940	1,193		−5.5%
1950	1,089		−8.7%
1960	1,118		2.7%
1970	1,155		3.3%
1980	1,304		12.9%
1990	1,447		11.0%
2000	1,406		−2.8%
2010	1,226		−12.8%
2020	1,116		−9.0%
2025 (est.)	1,128	▲	1.1%
U.S. Decennial Census; 1850–2010 2010 2020

=== Racial and ethnic composition ===
Glasscock County, Texas – Racial and ethnic composition Note: the US Census treats Hispanic/Latino as an ethnic category. This table excludes Latinos from the racial categories and assigns them to a separate category. Hispanics/Latinos may be of any race.
Race / Ethnicity (NH = Non-Hispanic)	Pop 1980	Pop 1990	Pop 2000	Pop 2010	Pop 2020	% 1980	% 1990	% 2000	% 2010	% 2020
White alone (NH)	917	1,018	955	825	710	70.32%	70.35%	67.92%	67.29%	63.62%
Black or African American alone (NH)	1	0	6	15	8	0.08%	0.00%	0.43%	1.22%	0.72%
Native American or Alaska Native alone (NH)	2	0	1	3	0	0.15%	0.00%	0.07%	0.24%	0.00%
Asian alone (NH)	1	0	0	1	0	0.08%	0.00%	0.00%	0.08%	0.00%
Native Hawaiian or Pacific Islander alone (NH)	x	x	0	2	3	x	x	0.00%	0.16%	0.27%
Other race alone (NH)	7	5	0	0	0	0.54%	0.35%	0.00%	0.00%	0.00%
Mixed race or Multiracial (NH)	x	x	24	2	8	x	x	1.71%	0.16%	0.72%
Hispanic or Latino (any race)	376	424	420	378	387	28.83%	29.30%	29.87%	30.83%	34.68%
Total	1,304	1,447	1,406	1,226	1,116	100.00%	100.00%	100.00%	100.00%	100.00%

=== 2020 census ===
As of the 2020 census, the county had a population of 1,116. The median age was 40.6 years. 24.4% of residents were under the age of 18 and 16.9% of residents were 65 years of age or older. For every 100 females there were 107.8 males, and for every 100 females age 18 and over there were 110.0 males age 18 and over.

The racial makeup of the county was 76.9% White, 0.7% Black or African American, 0.6% American Indian and Alaska Native, <0.1% Asian, 0.3% Native Hawaiian and Pacific Islander, 8.1% from some other race, and 13.4% from two or more races. Hispanic or Latino residents of any race comprised 34.7% of the population.

<0.1% of residents lived in urban areas, while 100.0% lived in rural areas.

There were 428 households in the county, of which 36.7% had children under the age of 18 living in them. Of all households, 67.5% were married-couple households, 17.3% were households with a male householder and no spouse or partner present, and 13.3% were households with a female householder and no spouse or partner present. About 17.5% of all households were made up of individuals and 7.0% had someone living alone who was 65 years of age or older.

There were 525 housing units, of which 18.5% were vacant. Among occupied housing units, 72.4% were owner-occupied and 27.6% were renter-occupied. The homeowner vacancy rate was 0.9% and the rental vacancy rate was 6.3%.

=== 2000 census ===
At the 2000 census there were 1,406 people, 483 households, and 355 families in the county. The population density was 2 people per square mile (0.77 people/km^{2}). There were 660 housing units at an average density of 1 units per square mile (0.39 units/km^{2}). The racial makeup of the county was 77.52% White, 0.50% Black or African American, 0.14% Native American, 0.21% Pacific Islander, 19.13% from other races, and 2.49% from two or more races. 29.87% of the population were Hispanic or Latino of any race. Of the 483 households 42.00% had children under the age of 18 living with them, 67.50% were married couples living together, 2.90% had a female householder with no husband present, and 26.50% were non-families. 23.80% of households were one person and 7.00% were one person aged 65 or older. The average household size was 2.91 and the average family size was 3.51.

The age distribution was 33.50% under the age of 18, 7.10% from 18 to 24, 28.40% from 25 to 44, 22.00% from 45 to 64, and 9.00% 65 or older. The median age was 34 years. For every 100 females there were 108.90 males. For every 100 females age 18 and over, there were 113.00 males.

The median household income was $35,655 and the median family income was $43,000. Males had a median income of $27,000 versus $27,083 for females. The per capita income for the county was $18,279. 14.70% of the population and 11.50% of families were below the poverty line. Out of the total people living in poverty, 17.50% are under the age of 18 and 4.10% are 65 or older.

== Politics ==
West Texas is one of the most strongly conservative areas of the nation, and Glasscock County is heavily Republican. The only time since 1948 it supported a Democrat for president was 1960. In the last eight elections, fewer than 100 voters have supported the Democratic candidate, and in the last seven elections, the Republican has carried over 90 percent of the county's vote.

In the 2000 U.S. presidential election, Glasscock County was the most strongly Republican county in the United States, giving 92.5% of its votes to Republican candidate George W. Bush.

United States presidential election results for Glasscock County, Texas
Year	Republican		Democratic		Third party(ies)	
Year	No.	%	No.	%	No.	%
1912	0	0.00%	60	100.00%	0	0.00%
1916	8	7.41%	96	88.89%	4	3.70%
1920	25	21.37%	91	77.78%	1	0.85%
1924	14	12.84%	89	81.65%	6	5.50%
1928	124	78.48%	34	21.52%	0	0.00%
1932	42	16.54%	212	83.46%	0	0.00%
1936	29	10.25%	252	89.05%	2	0.71%
1940	41	13.18%	268	86.17%	2	0.64%
1944	34	12.64%	185	68.77%	50	18.59%
1948	69	24.82%	188	67.63%	21	7.55%
1952	235	54.40%	197	45.60%	0	0.00%
1956	224	56.28%	174	43.72%	0	0.00%
1960	152	41.53%	207	56.56%	7	1.91%
1964	183	50.41%	179	49.31%	1	0.28%
1968	169	37.81%	106	23.71%	172	38.48%
1972	288	78.05%	75	20.33%	6	1.63%
1976	218	52.78%	190	46.00%	5	1.21%
1980	416	77.76%	116	21.68%	3	0.56%
1984	403	75.19%	128	23.88%	5	0.93%
1988	384	72.73%	143	27.08%	1	0.19%
1992	379	66.03%	100	17.42%	95	16.55%
1996	382	78.93%	70	14.46%	32	6.61%
2000	528	92.47%	39	6.83%	4	0.70%
2004	488	91.56%	44	8.26%	1	0.19%
2008	502	90.13%	52	9.34%	3	0.54%
2012	526	91.00%	44	7.61%	8	1.38%
2016	553	91.56%	34	5.63%	17	2.81%
2020	611	93.57%	39	5.97%	3	0.46%
2024	623	93.97%	38	5.73%	2	0.30%

United States Senate election results for Glasscock County, Texas1
Year	Republican		Democratic		Third party(ies)	
Year	No.	%	No.	%	No.	%
2024	616	93.33%	37	5.61%	7	1.06%

United States Senate election results for Glasscock County, Texas2
Year	Republican		Democratic		Third party(ies)	
Year	No.	%	No.	%	No.	%
2020	603	93.34%	35	5.42%	8	1.24%

Texas Gubernatorial election results for Glasscock County
Year	Republican		Democratic		Third party(ies)	
Year	No.	%	No.	%	No.	%
2022	542	94.76%	27	4.72%	3	0.52%

This pro-Republican trend is reflected in party membership. During the 2008 Presidential primary in Texas, 19 voters from Glasscock County cast ballots in the Democratic race, while over 400 cast ballots in the Republican race.

== Communities ==
- Garden City (county seat)
- St. Lawrence

== Education ==
All parts of the county are in the Glasscock County Independent School District.

All of Glasscock County is in the service area of Howard County Junior College District.

== See also ==
- National Register of Historic Places listings in Glasscock County, Texas
- Recorded Texas Historic Landmarks in Glasscock County
