= Glasscock County Independent School District =

School district in Texas

Coordinates: 31.8663°N 101.4844°W

Address
- 240 West Bearkat Avenue Garden City, Texas, 79739; United States

District information
- Type: Public
- Grades: PreK–12
- Superintendent: Mallory Marr
- NCES District ID: 4820790

Students and staff
- Students: 293 (2020–2021)
- Teachers: 34.65 (on an FTE basis)
- Staff: 36.26 (on an FTE basis)
- Student–teacher ratio: 8.46:1
- District mascot: Bearkats/Ladykats

Other information
- Website: www.gckats.net

Glasscock County Independent School District is a public school district located in Garden City, Texas, U.S. The district educates about 300 students in two schools.

The district includes all of Glasscock County.

Glasscock County ISD is the home of the Bearkats and Ladykats. The district's school colors are red, black, and white. The American football team won the 2009 Division I six-man football championship; the title game (against Strawn, a state six-man powerhouse in its own right) set several state championship records for a six-man contest:

- Most points scored in a title game by the winning team (122 by Garden City), the losing team (88 by Strawn) and total (210)
- Most points scored in a quarter (84 in the second quarter) and a half (116 in the first half)

In 2007, Glasscock County High School earned a Bronze Medal rank in the U.S. News/SchoolMatters Best High School ratings.

In 2009, the school district was rated "recognized" by the Texas Education Agency.

== Schools ==
School	Grades	Enrollment
Glasscock County Elementary School	PK – 6	169
Glasscock County High School	7 – 12	139

== Special programs ==
=== Athletics ===
Garden City High School plays six-man football.
