= Glascock (surname) =

Glascock is an English and Welsh habitational surname. In English, it originates from Glascote, whose name combines "glas" (old English for glass) and "cote" (a hut). In Welsh, it refers to Glascoed, which stands for "green wood" ("glas" + "coed"). The surname may refer to the following notable people:

- Aaron Glascock, sound editor
- Brian Glascock (born 1948), drummer
- David Glascock (1885–1969), American basketball coach
- John Glascock (1951–1979), British musician
- John R. Glascock (1845–1913), American politician
- Kathryn Irene Glascock (1901–1923), American poet
- Thomas Glascock (1790–1841), American politician, soldier and lawyer
- William Glascock (1730–1793), American politician
- William Nugent Glascock (c.1787–1847), British naval officer and novelist
