= Susanne M. Glasscock School of Continuing Studies =

Coordinates: 29.7135°N 95.4060°W

- Type: Private
- Affiliations: Rice University
- Location: Houston, Texas, United States
- Website: www.gscs.rice.edu

The Susanne M. Glasscock School of Continuing Studies at Rice University offers the Houston community the opportunity to study personal and professional areas of interest. It is named in honor of an endowment from Susanne and Melbern Glasscock.

== History ==
Established as the Office of Continuing Studies in December 1967, the school provides a bridge between Rice University and its Houston neighbors. Initially, classes were developed to teach area professionals about advances in their fields. From 1968 to 1972, between 150 and 200 students per year attended technical and business courses. In 1973, courses began to include humanities and subjects of general interest.

“Continuing Studies was indirectly responsible for launching a hit movie. When an Esquire Magazine editor spoke in the continuing studies publishing program in 1978, he was taken to Gilley's nightclub, and he later assigned an article for the magazine on the 'urban cowboy' phenomenon. The article was the basis for the 1980 hit movie of the same name, starring John Travolta and Debra Winger.”

In the 1990s, Continuing Studies developed more specialized technical courses. For example, “Advances in Tissue Engineering,” an annual event cosponsored by Rice's Institute of Biosciences and Bioengineering was first presented in 1993. The Rice University Advanced Placement Institute began in 1995 to provide training for middle and high school teachers. In 1997, the Rice Technology Education Center, which provides advanced computer training and certification, was added (the RTEC program was suspended in 2008). In fall 2005, the school began offering its first degree-granting program, the Master of Liberal Studies program.

In January 2006, the school was renamed the Susanne M. Glasscock School of Continuing Studies in honor of an endowment from Susanne and Melbern Glasscock.
