= Zavala, Texas =

Human settlement in Texas, United States of America

Coordinates: 31°00′33″N 94°08′18″W

Zavala was a town in Jasper County, Texas, United States, founded in 1834. Named for empresario Lorenzo de Zavala, the town was founded on land owned by Thomas Huling and situated along the Angelina River. The approximately 40 families who lived in the town subsisted by farming or logging. The town last appeared on a list of communities in the county in 1878 and has since been abandoned. It is not to be confused with the city of Zavalla, which lies only 20 miles to the northwest, in Angelina County.

== History ==
In 1829 the Mexican government granted empresario Lorenzo de Zavala land in eastern Texas. The land grant covered an area that is now Jasper County. Thomas Huling purchased some of this land, and in 1834 founded the town of Zavala, named for the empresario, and also known as Muster Point. The town was incorporated on December 24, 1838, by the Republic of Texas, and a post office was erected in 1839.

In the 1840s, a fire destroyed much of the town, including the courthouse, many homes, and most of the town records. In 1847, Huling sold much of the town, as well as 5,000 acres (2,000 ha) of land in Jasper County, to Englishman Jerich Durkee in exchange for $1000 and 5000 "tin boxes of Green Mountain Vegetable Ointment." Although the post office was discontinued in 1856, the town remained on a list of Jasper County communities as late as 1878. It has since been abandoned. All that remains of the town is a cemetery which includes a granite marker commemorating the town's previous existence.

== Geography ==
The town was located in Jasper County, approximately 12 miles (19 km) northwest of Jasper and 85 miles (137 km) north of Beaumont, and 50 miles (80 km) west of the Sabine River, which marks the border between Texas and Louisiana. Positioned "on a rise near the east bank of the Angelina river", Zavala lay along the Beef Trail, which ran from Texas into Louisiana. The landscape was very wooded, featuring loblolly pines, shortleaf pines, and oak trees.

== Demographics ==
At its peak, approximately 30–40 families lived in Zavala. Although Durkee promised to settle immigrants in the area, he was unable to attract enough families to enable the community to survive.

== Economy ==
Many of the town's residents were farmers. Others worked in logging. Trees would be cut and floated down the Angelina River to the Neches River, with Beaumont as their final destination. At one point in the town's history, a railroad line either went through or came very near the town.
