= Seagraves =

Seagraves may refer to:

== Places ==
- Seagraves, Texas
- Seagraves Independent School District in Seagraves, Texas
- Seagraves High School in Seagraves, Texas

== People ==
- Chris Seagraves (born 1964), English footballer
- Eleanor Roosevelt Seagraves (born 1927), American librarian, educator, historian, and editor
- Mark Seagraves (born 1966), British professional footballer
- Ralph Seagraves (1929 – 1998), American executive, president of R.J. Reynolds
- Skip Seagraves (born 1982) Canadian football player

== See also ==
- Segraves (disambiguation)
- Seagrave (disambiguation)
- Segrave (disambiguation)
