= Loop, Texas =

Census-designated place in Gaines County, Texas, United States

- Census-designated place
- Location within Texas Location within the United States
- Coordinates: 32°54′54″N 102°24′58″W
- Country: United States
- State: Texas
- County: Gaines

Area
  - Total: 3.6 sq mi (9.2 km^{2})
  - Land: 3.6 sq mi (9.2 km^{2})
  - Water: 0 sq mi (0.0 km^{2})
- Elevation: 3,257 ft (993 m)

Population (2010)
  - Total: 225
  - Density: 63/sq mi (24/km^{2})
- Time zone: UTC-6 (Central (CST))
  - Summer (DST): UTC-5 (CDT)
- ZIP code: 79342
- Area code: 806
- FIPS code: 48-43948
- GNIS feature ID: 2586954

Loop is a census-designated place (CDP) in Gaines County, Texas, United States. As of the 2020 census, Loop had a population of 216.

The community was named for the loop of the postmaster's lasso.

== Geography ==
Loop is located in northeastern Gaines County along Texas State Highway 83, which leads west 9 miles (14 km) to Seagraves and east 17 miles (27 km) to Welch. Seminole, the Gaines County seat, is 26 miles (42 km) to the southwest by road.

According to the U.S. Census Bureau, the Loop CDP has an area of 3.54 square miles (9.17 km^{2}), all land.

== Demographics ==
Historical population
Census	Pop.	Note	%±
2010	225		—
2020	216		−4.0%
U.S. Decennial Census; 1850–1900 1910; 1920 1930 1940; 1950 1960 1970; 1980 1990 2000; 2010 2020

Loop first appeared as a census designated place in the 2010 U.S. census.

=== 2020 census ===
Loop CDP, Texas – Racial and ethnic composition Note: the US Census treats Hispanic/Latino as an ethnic category. This table excludes Latinos from the racial categories and assigns them to a separate category. Hispanics/Latinos may be of any race.
Race / Ethnicity (NH = Non-Hispanic)	Pop 2010	Pop 2020	% 2010	% 2020
White alone (NH)	117	114	52.00%	52.78%
Black or African American alone (NH)	9	0	4.00%	0.00%
Native American or Alaska Native alone (NH)	0	1	0.00%	0.46%
Mixed race or Multiracial (NH)	2	3	0.89%	1.39%
Hispanic or Latino (any race)	96	98	42.67%	45.37%
Total	225	216	100.00%	100.00%

== Education ==
The Loop Independent School District serves area students. The campus includes all grades from kindergarten to 12th grade. All students are located on the single campus, with a circular building for the primary school, and the high-school and middle-school students sharing a long, rectangular hallway.

The school participates in the Texas University Interscholastic League. The school's mascot is the Loop Longhorn. The school participates in sports, including six-man football, volleyball, basketball, tennis, and track and field. The school also has maintained a marching band and concert band program.

== See also ==
- List of census-designated places in Texas
