= Plains, Borden County, Texas =

Plains, Texas
- Unincorporated community
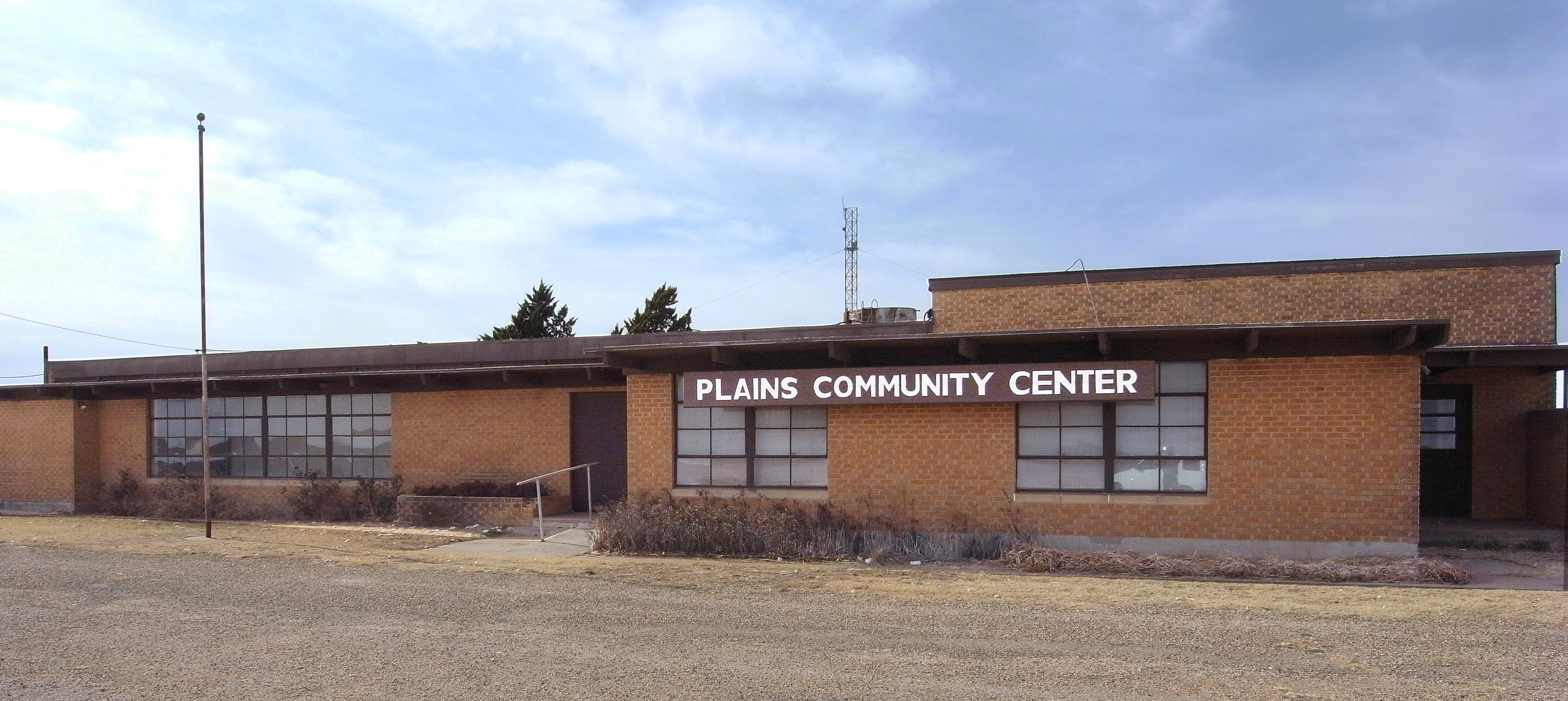
- Plains Community Center

- Location within Texas Location within the United States
- Coordinates: 32°54′44″N 101°38′41″W
- Country: United States
- State: Texas
- County: Borden
- Elevation: 2,956 ft (901 m)
- Time zone: UTC-6 (Central (CST))
  - Summer (DST): UTC-5 (CDT)
- Area code: 806
- GNIS feature ID: 1378876

Plains is an unincorporated community on the high plains of the Llano Estacado in Borden County, Texas, United States. Plains is located on Farm to Market Road 1054, 15 miles (24 km) northwest of Gail. Plains sits 3 miles (4.82 km) north of Mesquite, a ghost town.

== Politics ==
Only one voter from Plains cast a ballot in the 2025 Texas constitutional amendment election.

=== 2026 Senate primay elections ===
Three Plains voters cast ballots in the Republican primary for the 2026 Texas Senate election. Incumbent John Cornyn won 100% of the vote.

No voters cast ballots in the Democratic primary.
