= 1980 United States presidential election in Texas =

- November 4, 1980
- Turnout: 68.40% (of registered voters) ▲45.55% (of voting age population)

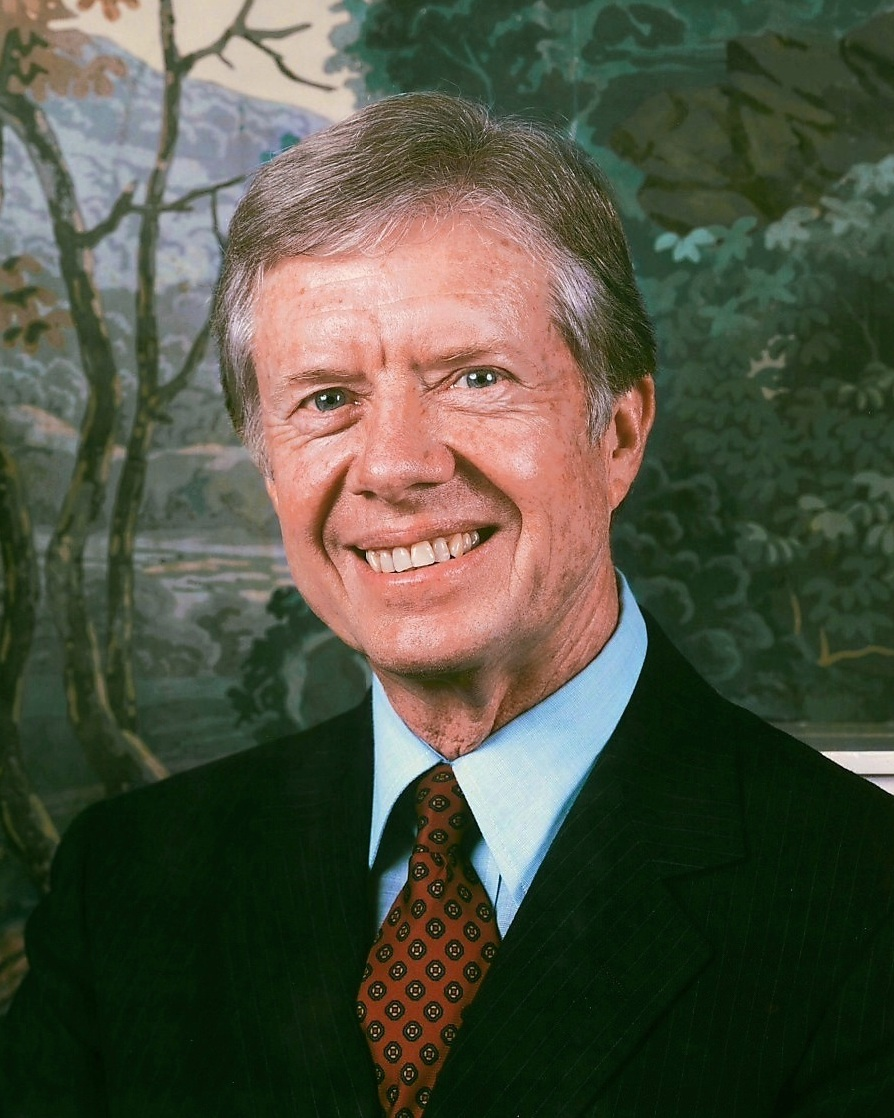
Nominee	Ronald Reagan	Jimmy Carter
Party	Republican	Democratic
Home state	California	Georgia
Running mate	George H. W. Bush	Walter Mondale
Electoral vote	26	0
Popular vote	2,510,705	1,881,147
Percentage	55.28%	41.42%

Reagan
40–50%
50–60%
60–70%
70–80%
80–90%
Carter
40–50%
50–60%
60–70%
70–80%
President before election
Jimmy Carter
Democratic
Elected President
Ronald Reagan
Republican

The 1980 United States presidential election in Texas took place on November 4, 1980. All 50 states, and the District of Columbia, were part of the 1980 United States presidential election. Texas voters chose 26 electors to the Electoral College, which selected the president and vice president of the United States.

Texas was won by Ronald Reagan of California, who was running against incumbent President Jimmy Carter of Georgia. Reagan ran with former C.I.A. Director George H. W. Bush of Texas, and Carter ran with Vice President Walter Mondale of Minnesota. Though Texas had voted for Carter in 1976, four years later the state supported Reagan by a wide margin in the midst of a national landslide.

While Carter failed to carry the state in 1980, he remains (through the 2024 election) the last Democratic presidential candidate to have won the following counties: Cherokee, Coke, Erath, Kaufman, Leon, Somervell, (Note: Somervell County gave a plurality to Independent Ross Perot in 1992.) Van Zandt and Wise. This was also the last time Texas voted more Democratic than California.

Among white voters, 59% supported Reagan while 37% supported Carter.

== Results ==
Electoral results
Presidential candidate	Party	Home state	Popular vote		Electoral vote	Running mate		
Presidential candidate	Party	Home state	Count	Percentage	Electoral vote	Vice-presidential candidate	Home state	Electoral vote
Ronald Reagan	Republican	California	2,510,705	55.28%	26	George H. W. Bush	Texas	26
Jimmy Carter (incumbent)	Democratic	Georgia	1,881,147	41.42%	0	Walter Mondale (incumbent)	Minnesota	0
John B. Anderson	Independent	Illinois	111,613	2.46%	0	Milton S. Eisenhower	Maryland	0
Ed Clark	Libertarian	California	37,643	0.83%	0	David Koch	New York	0
Write-in candidates	—	—	529	0.01%	0	—	—	0
Total			4,541,637	100%	26			26
Needed to win					270			270

=== Results by county ===
County	Ronald Reagan Republican		Jimmy Carter Democratic		John B. Anderson Independent		Various candidates Other parties		Margin		Total votes cast
County	#	%	#	%	#	%	#	%	#	%	Total votes cast
Anderson	5,970	52.69%	5,163	45.57%	137	1.21%	60	0.53%	807	7.12%	11,330
Andrews	2,800	69.77%	1,155	28.78%	39	0.97%	19	0.47%	1,645	40.99%	4,013
Angelina	9,900	48.54%	10,140	49.72%	232	1.14%	122	0.60%	-240	-1.18%	20,394
Aransas	3,081	60.79%	1,800	35.52%	134	2.64%	53	1.05%	1,281	25.27%	5,068
Archer	1,804	54.85%	1,444	43.90%	30	0.91%	11	0.33%	360	10.95%	3,289
Armstrong	709	66.57%	333	31.27%	9	0.85%	14	1.31%	376	35.30%	1,065
Atascosa	4,364	51.53%	3,980	46.99%	93	1.10%	32	0.38%	384	4.54%	8,469
Austin	3,734	64.91%	1,893	32.90%	87	1.51%	39	0.68%	1,841	32.01%	5,753
Bailey	1,809	68.14%	800	30.13%	26	0.98%	20	0.75%	1,009	38.01%	2,655
Bandera	2,373	70.63%	894	26.61%	64	1.90%	29	0.86%	1,479	44.02%	3,360
Bastrop	3,768	43.07%	4,716	53.91%	205	2.34%	59	0.67%	-948	-10.84%	8,748
Baylor	1,098	47.61%	1,183	51.30%	14	0.61%	11	0.48%	-85	-3.69%	2,306
Bee	4,171	52.59%	3,606	45.47%	125	1.58%	29	0.37%	565	7.12%	7,931
Bell	20,729	54.72%	15,823	41.77%	934	2.47%	399	1.05%	4,906	12.95%	37,885
Bexar	159,578	51.73%	137,729	44.65%	9,467	3.07%	1,700	0.55%	21,849	7.08%	308,474
Blanco	1,434	62.32%	794	34.51%	52	2.26%	21	0.91%	640	27.81%	2,301
Borden	279	67.23%	131	31.57%	3	0.72%	2	0.48%	148	35.66%	415
Bosque	2,908	53.49%	2,431	44.71%	62	1.14%	36	0.66%	477	8.78%	5,437
Bowie	13,942	54.35%	11,339	44.21%	244	0.95%	125	0.49%	2,603	10.14%	25,650
Brazoria	27,614	58.08%	18,253	38.39%	1,205	2.53%	472	0.99%	9,361	19.69%	47,544
Brazos	17,798	60.25%	9,856	33.37%	1,453	4.92%	432	1.46%	7,942	26.88%	29,539
Brewster	1,496	51.73%	1,271	43.95%	89	3.08%	36	1.24%	225	7.78%	2,892
Briscoe	562	48.87%	561	48.78%	13	1.13%	14	1.22%	1	0.09%	1,150
Brooks	780	23.40%	2,488	74.65%	43	1.29%	22	0.66%	-1,708	-51.25%	3,333
Brown	6,515	56.41%	4,867	42.14%	102	0.88%	65	0.56%	1,648	14.27%	11,549
Burleson	1,943	42.16%	2,615	56.74%	33	0.72%	18	0.39%	-672	-14.58%	4,609
Burnet	4,033	50.84%	3,711	46.78%	132	1.66%	57	0.72%	322	4.06%	7,933
Caldwell	2,879	46.56%	3,155	51.02%	112	1.81%	38	0.61%	-276	-4.46%	6,184
Calhoun	3,312	50.57%	3,034	46.33%	136	2.08%	67	1.02%	278	4.24%	6,549
Callahan	2,284	52.74%	2,002	46.22%	29	0.67%	16	0.37%	282	6.52%	4,331
Cameron	22,041	47.62%	23,200	50.12%	801	1.73%	243	0.53%	-1,159	-2.50%	46,285
Camp	1,531	42.32%	2,052	56.72%	19	0.53%	16	0.44%	-521	-14.40%	3,618
Carson	1,888	64.17%	1,006	34.19%	26	0.88%	22	0.75%	882	29.98%	2,942
Cass	4,993	46.79%	5,578	52.27%	60	0.56%	41	0.38%	-585	-5.48%	10,672
Castro	1,955	60.75%	1,199	37.26%	44	1.37%	20	0.62%	756	23.49%	3,218
Chambers	3,140	54.08%	2,517	43.35%	96	1.65%	53	0.91%	623	10.73%	5,806
Cherokee	5,629	49.01%	5,726	49.85%	92	0.80%	39	0.34%	-97	-0.84%	11,486
Childress	1,443	53.19%	1,222	45.04%	33	1.22%	15	0.55%	221	8.15%	2,713
Clay	1,824	44.39%	2,233	54.34%	40	0.97%	12	0.29%	-409	-9.95%	4,109
Cochran	1,064	66.21%	513	31.92%	23	1.43%	7	0.44%	551	34.29%	1,607
Coke	708	45.44%	838	53.79%	10	0.64%	2	0.13%	-130	-8.35%	1,558
Coleman	2,228	55.78%	1,719	43.04%	33	0.83%	14	0.35%	509	12.74%	3,994
Collin	36,559	67.88%	15,187	28.20%	1,559	2.89%	556	1.03%	21,372	39.68%	53,861
Collingsworth	1,020	55.11%	798	43.11%	18	0.97%	15	0.81%	222	12.00%	1,851
Colorado	3,520	58.75%	2,377	39.68%	58	0.97%	36	0.60%	1,143	19.07%	5,991
Comal	9,758	71.15%	3,554	25.92%	324	2.36%	78	0.57%	6,204	45.23%	13,714
Comanche	1,977	43.09%	2,550	55.58%	40	0.87%	21	0.46%	-573	-12.49%	4,588
Concho	700	49.40%	702	49.54%	8	0.56%	7	0.49%	-2	-0.14%	1,417
Cooke	6,760	62.58%	3,842	35.57%	129	1.19%	71	0.66%	2,918	27.01%	10,802
Coryell	5,494	55.38%	4,097	41.30%	228	2.30%	101	1.02%	1,397	14.08%	9,920
Cottle	511	40.36%	732	57.82%	9	0.71%	14	1.11%	-221	-17.46%	1,266
Crane	1,310	67.15%	607	31.11%	23	1.18%	11	0.56%	703	36.04%	1,951
Crockett	885	59.24%	595	39.83%	10	0.67%	4	0.27%	290	19.41%	1,494
Crosby	1,361	48.50%	1,408	50.18%	17	0.61%	20	0.71%	-47	-1.68%	2,806
Culberson	541	55.43%	423	43.34%	7	0.72%	5	0.51%	118	12.09%	976
Dallam	965	58.88%	632	38.56%	33	2.01%	9	0.55%	333	20.32%	1,639
Dallas	306,682	59.18%	190,459	36.75%	14,271	2.75%	6,801	1.31%	116,223	22.43%	518,213
Dawson	3,267	62.77%	1,867	35.87%	55	1.06%	16	0.31%	1,400	26.90%	5,205
Deaf Smith	4,073	69.46%	1,666	28.41%	77	1.31%	48	0.82%	2,407	41.05%	5,864
Delta	767	35.81%	1,347	62.89%	18	0.84%	10	0.47%	-580	-27.08%	2,142
Denton	29,908	59.93%	17,381	34.83%	1,953	3.91%	666	1.33%	12,527	25.10%	49,908
DeWitt	3,450	61.83%	2,044	36.63%	66	1.18%	20	0.36%	1,406	25.20%	5,580
Dickens	554	37.41%	912	61.58%	13	0.88%	2	0.14%	-358	-24.17%	1,481
Dimmit	1,173	35.30%	2,102	63.26%	25	0.75%	23	0.69%	-929	-27.96%	3,323
Donley	1,106	58.58%	751	39.78%	22	1.17%	9	0.48%	355	18.80%	1,888
Duval	1,012	21.27%	3,706	77.91%	28	0.59%	11	0.23%	-2,694	-56.64%	4,757
Eastland	3,442	50.05%	3,346	48.65%	37	0.54%	52	0.76%	96	1.40%	6,877
Ector	26,188	72.38%	9,069	25.07%	636	1.76%	286	0.79%	17,119	47.31%	36,179
Edwards	575	69.78%	237	28.76%	11	1.33%	1	0.12%	338	41.02%	824
Ellis	10,046	51.31%	9,219	47.08%	214	1.09%	101	0.52%	827	4.23%	19,580
El Paso	53,276	53.53%	40,082	40.27%	5,096	5.12%	1,072	1.08%	13,194	13.26%	99,526
Erath	3,981	47.93%	4,156	50.04%	92	1.11%	77	0.93%	-175	-2.11%	8,306
Falls	2,606	43.38%	3,328	55.40%	51	0.85%	22	0.37%	-722	-12.02%	6,007
Fannin	3,196	37.12%	5,284	61.36%	74	0.86%	57	0.66%	-2,088	-24.24%	8,611
Fayette	4,104	60.32%	2,590	38.07%	77	1.13%	33	0.49%	1,514	22.25%	6,804
Fisher	838	34.39%	1,564	64.18%	23	0.94%	12	0.49%	-726	-29.79%	2,437
Floyd	2,043	57.45%	1,477	41.54%	24	0.67%	12	0.34%	566	15.91%	3,556
Foard	349	35.69%	617	63.09%	7	0.72%	5	0.51%	-268	-27.40%	978
Fort Bend	25,366	66.25%	11,583	30.25%	1,005	2.62%	332	0.87%	13,783	36.00%	38,286
Franklin	1,105	41.97%	1,487	56.48%	14	0.53%	27	1.03%	-382	-14.51%	2,633
Freestone	2,468	46.88%	2,739	52.02%	33	0.63%	25	0.47%	-271	-5.14%	5,265
Frio	1,753	37.55%	2,849	61.03%	47	1.01%	19	0.41%	-1,096	-23.48%	4,668
Gaines	2,390	65.37%	1,182	32.33%	46	1.26%	38	1.04%	1,208	33.04%	3,656
Galveston	29,527	46.65%	30,778	48.62%	1,955	3.09%	1,037	1.64%	-1,251	-1.97%	63,297
Garza	1,188	62.63%	677	35.69%	22	1.16%	10	0.53%	511	26.94%	1,897
Gillespie	4,736	78.70%	1,170	19.44%	90	1.50%	22	0.37%	3,566	59.26%	6,018
Glasscock	416	77.76%	116	21.68%	2	0.37%	1	0.19%	300	56.08%	535
Goliad	1,170	51.16%	1,081	47.27%	22	0.96%	14	0.61%	89	3.89%	2,287
Gonzales	2,931	49.49%	2,896	48.90%	61	1.03%	34	0.57%	35	0.59%	5,922
Gray	7,187	70.81%	2,786	27.45%	103	1.01%	73	0.72%	4,401	43.36%	10,149
Grayson	16,811	53.66%	13,807	44.08%	532	1.70%	176	0.56%	3,004	9.58%	31,326
Gregg	23,399	68.44%	10,219	29.89%	311	0.91%	261	0.76%	13,180	38.55%	34,190
Grimes	2,087	45.35%	2,440	53.02%	42	0.91%	33	0.72%	-353	-7.67%	4,602
Guadalupe	9,901	64.18%	5,049	32.73%	407	2.64%	71	0.46%	4,852	31.45%	15,428
Hale	7,277	65.86%	3,610	32.67%	123	1.11%	40	0.36%	3,667	33.19%	11,050
Hall	1,141	51.40%	1,057	47.61%	13	0.59%	9	0.41%	84	3.79%	2,220
Hamilton	1,683	51.52%	1,526	46.71%	30	0.92%	28	0.86%	157	4.81%	3,267
Hansford	2,046	78.81%	518	19.95%	17	0.65%	15	0.58%	1,528	58.86%	2,596
Hardeman	1,056	46.46%	1,174	51.65%	28	1.23%	15	0.66%	-118	-5.19%	2,273
Hardin	6,087	44.33%	7,358	53.58%	200	1.46%	87	0.63%	-1,271	-9.25%	13,732
Harris	416,655	57.87%	274,061	38.06%	22,917	3.18%	6,381	0.89%	142,594	19.81%	720,014
Harrison	9,328	53.32%	7,746	44.28%	125	0.71%	294	1.68%	1,582	9.04%	17,493
Hartley	1,248	71.03%	470	26.75%	28	1.59%	11	0.63%	778	44.28%	1,757
Haskell	1,447	42.11%	1,951	56.78%	22	0.64%	16	0.47%	-504	-14.67%	3,436
Hays	6,517	49.04%	6,013	45.25%	590	4.44%	169	1.27%	504	3.79%	13,289
Hemphill	1,152	64.72%	592	33.26%	21	1.18%	15	0.84%	560	31.46%	1,780
Henderson	7,903	48.47%	8,199	50.29%	134	0.82%	69	0.42%	-296	-1.82%	16,305
Hidalgo	25,808	41.82%	34,542	55.97%	1,063	1.72%	304	0.49%	-8,734	-14.15%	61,717
Hill	4,113	46.03%	4,688	52.46%	73	0.82%	62	0.69%	-575	-6.43%	8,936
Hockley	4,599	64.03%	2,447	34.07%	90	1.25%	47	0.65%	2,152	29.96%	7,183
Hood	3,755	54.11%	3,001	43.24%	109	1.57%	75	1.08%	754	10.87%	6,940
Hopkins	3,834	46.09%	4,344	52.22%	93	1.12%	47	0.57%	-510	-6.13%	8,318
Houston	2,889	40.44%	4,181	58.52%	47	0.66%	27	0.38%	-1,292	-18.08%	7,144
Howard	6,658	58.86%	4,451	39.35%	158	1.40%	45	0.40%	2,207	19.51%	11,312
Hudspeth	471	53.28%	394	44.57%	14	1.58%	5	0.57%	77	8.71%	884
Hunt	9,283	50.18%	8,773	47.42%	327	1.77%	118	0.64%	510	2.76%	18,501
Hutchinson	7,439	69.97%	2,935	27.61%	170	1.60%	88	0.83%	4,504	42.36%	10,632
Irion	427	63.73%	239	35.67%	2	0.30%	2	0.30%	188	28.06%	670
Jack	1,482	51.51%	1,349	46.89%	29	1.01%	17	0.59%	133	4.62%	2,877
Jackson	2,540	56.91%	1,826	40.91%	66	1.48%	31	0.69%	714	16.00%	4,463
Jasper	4,396	42.86%	5,707	55.64%	98	0.96%	56	0.55%	-1,311	-12.78%	10,257
Jeff Davis	409	56.10%	300	41.15%	10	1.37%	10	1.37%	109	14.95%	729
Jefferson	36,763	43.45%	45,642	53.95%	1,664	1.97%	533	0.63%	-8,879	-10.50%	84,602
Jim Hogg	535	26.79%	1,437	71.96%	23	1.15%	2	0.10%	-902	-45.17%	1,997
Jim Wells	4,606	38.34%	7,267	60.49%	102	0.85%	38	0.32%	-2,661	-22.15%	12,013
Johnson	11,411	50.82%	10,542	46.95%	333	1.48%	168	0.75%	869	3.87%	22,454
Jones	2,765	47.07%	3,043	51.80%	45	0.77%	21	0.36%	-278	-4.73%	5,874
Karnes	2,719	53.59%	2,284	45.01%	52	1.02%	19	0.37%	435	8.58%	5,074
Kaufman	5,852	47.63%	6,266	51.00%	110	0.90%	59	0.48%	-414	-3.37%	12,287
Kendall	3,890	76.48%	1,075	21.14%	88	1.73%	33	0.65%	2,815	55.34%	5,086
Kenedy	76	40.64%	106	56.68%	2	1.07%	3	1.60%	-30	-16.04%	187
Kent	339	48.85%	351	50.58%	0	0.00%	4	0.58%	-12	-1.73%	694
Kerr	9,090	70.71%	3,387	26.35%	259	2.01%	119	0.93%	5,703	44.36%	12,855
Kimble	1,011	61.24%	608	36.83%	22	1.33%	10	0.61%	403	24.41%	1,651
King	144	70.24%	55	26.83%	5	2.44%	1	0.49%	89	43.41%	205
Kinney	543	51.91%	472	45.12%	23	2.20%	8	0.76%	71	6.79%	1,046
Kleberg	4,608	45.84%	5,125	50.98%	231	2.30%	89	0.89%	-517	-5.14%	10,053
Knox	783	39.79%	1,163	59.10%	17	0.86%	5	0.25%	-380	-19.31%	1,968
Lamar	6,094	45.17%	7,178	53.21%	148	1.10%	70	0.52%	-1,084	-8.04%	13,490
Lamb	3,723	62.75%	2,132	35.93%	51	0.86%	27	0.46%	1,591	26.82%	5,933
Lampasas	2,323	53.02%	1,979	45.17%	56	1.28%	23	0.52%	344	7.85%	4,381
La Salle	773	34.39%	1,442	64.15%	19	0.85%	14	0.62%	-669	-29.76%	2,248
Lavaca	3,254	54.24%	2,678	44.64%	54	0.90%	13	0.22%	576	9.60%	5,999
Lee	1,803	52.08%	1,581	45.67%	59	1.70%	19	0.55%	222	6.41%	3,462
Leon	1,821	44.93%	2,190	54.03%	19	0.47%	23	0.57%	-369	-9.10%	4,053
Liberty	6,470	47.71%	6,810	50.22%	163	1.20%	118	0.87%	-340	-2.51%	13,561
Limestone	2,835	44.86%	3,403	53.85%	45	0.71%	36	0.57%	-568	-8.99%	6,319
Lipscomb	1,343	77.50%	338	19.50%	28	1.62%	24	1.38%	1,005	58.00%	1,733
Live Oak	2,193	60.61%	1,380	38.14%	32	0.88%	13	0.36%	813	22.47%	3,618
Llano	2,866	56.23%	2,130	41.79%	72	1.41%	29	0.57%	736	14.44%	5,097
Loving	50	69.44%	22	30.56%	0	0.00%	0	0.00%	28	38.88%	72
Lubbock	46,711	68.83%	18,732	27.60%	1,952	2.88%	472	0.70%	27,979	41.23%	67,867
Lynn	1,603	55.78%	1,236	43.01%	28	0.97%	7	0.24%	367	12.77%	2,874
McCulloch	1,572	46.70%	1,750	51.99%	24	0.71%	20	0.59%	-178	-5.29%	3,366
McLennan	31,968	53.71%	26,305	44.20%	964	1.62%	278	0.47%	5,663	9.51%	59,515
McMullen	271	68.09%	122	30.65%	4	1.01%	1	0.25%	149	37.44%	398
Madison	1,389	46.02%	1,583	52.45%	32	1.06%	14	0.46%	-194	-6.43%	3,018
Marion	1,666	44.66%	2,015	54.02%	28	0.75%	21	0.56%	-349	-9.36%	3,730
Martin	1,093	63.69%	605	35.26%	15	0.87%	3	0.17%	488	28.43%	1,716
Mason	966	59.59%	630	38.86%	17	1.05%	8	0.49%	336	20.73%	1,621
Matagorda	5,545	53.41%	4,585	44.16%	146	1.41%	106	1.02%	960	9.25%	10,382
Maverick	1,370	31.37%	2,932	67.14%	39	0.89%	26	0.60%	-1,562	-35.77%	4,367
Medina	4,742	60.12%	3,034	38.46%	84	1.06%	28	0.35%	1,708	21.66%	7,888
Menard	548	52.19%	489	46.57%	11	1.05%	2	0.19%	59	5.62%	1,050
Midland	25,027	76.55%	6,839	20.92%	586	1.79%	240	0.73%	18,188	55.63%	32,692
Milam	3,251	42.62%	4,230	55.46%	111	1.46%	35	0.46%	-979	-12.84%	7,627
Mills	985	47.84%	1,028	49.93%	24	1.17%	22	1.07%	-43	-2.09%	2,059
Mitchell	1,455	49.73%	1,446	49.42%	12	0.41%	13	0.44%	9	0.31%	2,926
Montague	3,143	48.56%	3,233	49.95%	59	0.91%	37	0.57%	-90	-1.39%	6,472
Montgomery	26,237	65.64%	12,593	31.51%	819	2.05%	322	0.81%	13,644	34.13%	39,971
Moore	3,736	66.92%	1,743	31.22%	67	1.20%	37	0.66%	1,993	35.70%	5,583
Morris	2,133	40.40%	3,105	58.81%	27	0.51%	15	0.28%	-972	-18.41%	5,280
Motley	573	61.68%	341	36.71%	7	0.75%	8	0.86%	232	24.97%	929
Nacogdoches	8,626	56.94%	5,981	39.48%	422	2.79%	121	0.80%	2,645	17.46%	15,150
Navarro	5,400	42.89%	6,988	55.50%	126	1.00%	77	0.61%	-1,588	-12.61%	12,591
Newton	1,379	29.25%	3,284	69.66%	24	0.51%	27	0.57%	-1,905	-40.41%	4,714
Nolan	2,781	48.83%	2,796	49.10%	87	1.53%	31	0.54%	-15	-0.27%	5,695
Nueces	40,586	46.84%	43,424	50.12%	2,045	2.36%	589	0.68%	-2,838	-3.28%	86,644
Ochiltree	3,032	81.90%	594	16.05%	52	1.40%	24	0.65%	2,438	65.85%	3,702
Oldham	557	63.73%	290	33.18%	9	1.03%	18	2.06%	267	30.55%	874
Orange	12,389	44.43%	14,928	53.53%	395	1.42%	175	0.63%	-2,539	-9.10%	27,887
Palo Pinto	4,068	47.95%	4,244	50.02%	98	1.16%	74	0.87%	-176	-2.07%	8,484
Panola	4,022	51.92%	3,637	46.95%	58	0.75%	30	0.39%	385	4.97%	7,747
Parker	8,505	52.65%	7,336	45.41%	189	1.17%	125	0.77%	1,169	7.24%	16,155
Parmer	2,640	77.69%	707	20.81%	30	0.88%	21	0.62%	1,933	56.88%	3,398
Pecos	2,723	61.96%	1,602	36.45%	37	0.84%	33	0.75%	1,121	25.51%	4,395
Polk	3,771	46.51%	4,213	51.96%	80	0.99%	44	0.54%	-442	-5.45%	8,108
Potter	16,327	60.85%	9,633	35.90%	545	2.03%	326	1.22%	6,694	24.95%	26,831
Presidio	723	40.19%	1,039	57.75%	22	1.22%	15	0.83%	-316	-17.56%	1,799
Rains	813	40.21%	1,174	58.06%	18	0.89%	17	0.84%	-361	-17.85%	2,022
Randall	23,136	73.72%	7,323	23.34%	677	2.16%	246	0.78%	15,813	50.38%	31,382
Reagan	917	67.88%	414	30.64%	14	1.04%	6	0.44%	503	37.24%	1,351
Real	832	57.26%	603	41.50%	14	0.96%	4	0.28%	229	15.76%	1,453
Red River	2,225	38.54%	3,501	60.64%	31	0.54%	16	0.28%	-1,276	-22.10%	5,773
Reeves	2,315	50.95%	2,138	47.05%	52	1.14%	39	0.86%	177	3.90%	4,544
Refugio	1,944	45.73%	2,224	52.32%	57	1.34%	26	0.61%	-280	-6.59%	4,251
Roberts	482	75.08%	150	23.36%	4	0.62%	6	0.93%	332	51.72%	642
Robertson	1,661	31.28%	3,572	67.27%	33	0.62%	44	0.83%	-1,911	-35.99%	5,310
Rockwall	4,036	65.27%	1,985	32.10%	113	1.83%	50	0.81%	2,051	33.17%	6,184
Runnels	2,532	59.82%	1,648	38.93%	36	0.85%	17	0.40%	884	20.89%	4,233
Rusk	8,705	60.17%	5,582	38.58%	116	0.80%	64	0.44%	3,123	21.59%	14,467
Sabine	1,387	40.82%	1,983	58.36%	15	0.44%	13	0.38%	-596	-17.54%	3,398
San Augustine	1,397	45.20%	1,674	54.16%	14	0.45%	6	0.19%	-277	-8.96%	3,091
San Jacinto	1,726	41.16%	2,376	56.67%	42	1.00%	49	1.17%	-650	-15.51%	4,193
San Patricio	8,326	47.59%	8,627	49.31%	280	1.60%	261	1.49%	-301	-1.72%	17,494
San Saba	948	39.75%	1,405	58.91%	23	0.96%	9	0.38%	-457	-19.16%	2,385
Schleicher	672	59.42%	444	39.26%	6	0.53%	9	0.80%	228	20.16%	1,131
Scurry	3,745	64.06%	2,003	34.26%	53	0.91%	45	0.77%	1,742	29.80%	5,846
Shackelford	959	60.66%	606	38.33%	9	0.57%	7	0.44%	353	22.33%	1,581
Shelby	3,500	44.85%	4,215	54.01%	71	0.91%	18	0.23%	-715	-9.16%	7,804
Sherman	1,128	77.47%	286	19.64%	28	1.92%	14	0.96%	842	57.83%	1,456
Smith	28,236	64.61%	14,838	33.95%	414	0.95%	212	0.49%	13,398	30.66%	43,700
Somervell	792	42.76%	1,015	54.81%	21	1.13%	24	1.30%	-223	-12.05%	1,852
Starr	1,389	22.21%	4,782	76.48%	50	0.80%	32	0.51%	-3,393	-54.27%	6,253
Stephens	2,161	59.89%	1,372	38.03%	34	0.94%	41	1.14%	789	21.86%	3,608
Sterling	364	62.12%	218	37.20%	2	0.34%	2	0.34%	146	24.92%	586
Stonewall	488	40.03%	719	58.98%	6	0.49%	6	0.49%	-231	-18.95%	1,219
Sutton	1,000	66.18%	485	32.10%	13	0.86%	13	0.86%	515	34.08%	1,511
Swisher	1,450	43.08%	1,854	55.08%	50	1.49%	12	0.36%	-404	-12.00%	3,366
Tarrant	173,466	56.86%	121,068	39.69%	7,818	2.56%	2,714	0.89%	52,398	17.17%	305,066
Taylor	22,961	62.00%	13,245	35.77%	620	1.67%	206	0.56%	9,716	26.23%	37,032
Terrell	411	59.91%	260	37.90%	14	2.04%	1	0.15%	151	22.01%	686
Terry	3,178	61.17%	1,945	37.44%	45	0.87%	27	0.52%	1,233	23.73%	5,195
Throckmorton	444	48.90%	455	50.11%	7	0.77%	2	0.22%	-11	-1.21%	908
Titus	3,747	48.66%	3,872	50.29%	44	0.57%	37	0.48%	-125	-1.63%	7,700
Tom Green	16,555	60.71%	9,892	36.27%	661	2.42%	163	0.60%	6,663	24.44%	27,271
Travis	73,151	45.69%	75,028	46.87%	9,796	6.12%	2,118	1.32%	-1,877	-1.18%	160,093
Trinity	1,503	36.95%	2,510	61.70%	32	0.79%	23	0.57%	-1,007	-24.75%	4,068
Tyler	2,545	41.08%	3,540	57.14%	70	1.13%	40	0.65%	-995	-16.06%	6,195
Upshur	4,836	49.09%	4,894	49.68%	78	0.79%	44	0.45%	-58	-0.59%	9,852
Upton	1,169	69.42%	485	28.80%	13	0.77%	17	1.01%	684	40.62%	1,684
Uvalde	3,887	61.06%	2,402	37.73%	62	0.97%	15	0.24%	1,485	23.33%	6,366
Val Verde	5,055	54.05%	4,116	44.01%	145	1.55%	37	0.40%	939	10.04%	9,353
Van Zandt	5,495	48.46%	5,707	50.33%	78	0.69%	60	0.53%	-212	-1.87%	11,340
Victoria	13,392	62.96%	7,382	34.71%	347	1.63%	148	0.70%	6,010	28.25%	21,269
Walker	5,657	51.87%	4,869	44.65%	274	2.51%	106	0.97%	788	7.22%	10,906
Waller	3,019	46.71%	3,329	51.51%	76	1.18%	39	0.60%	-310	-4.80%	6,463
Ward	2,912	66.24%	1,405	31.96%	50	1.14%	29	0.66%	1,507	34.28%	4,396
Washington	4,821	64.32%	2,518	33.60%	95	1.27%	61	0.81%	2,303	30.72%	7,495
Webb	5,421	30.81%	11,856	67.39%	242	1.38%	74	0.42%	-6,435	-36.58%	17,593
Wharton	6,598	55.18%	5,138	42.97%	160	1.34%	62	0.52%	1,460	12.21%	11,958
Wheeler	1,626	59.28%	1,090	39.74%	16	0.58%	11	0.40%	536	19.54%	2,743
Wichita	22,884	54.98%	17,657	42.42%	847	2.03%	237	0.57%	5,227	12.56%	41,625
Wilbarger	3,031	55.48%	2,347	42.96%	53	0.97%	32	0.59%	684	12.52%	5,463
Willacy	1,995	39.06%	3,047	59.65%	38	0.74%	28	0.55%	-1,052	-20.59%	5,108
Williamson	15,035	56.39%	10,408	39.04%	946	3.55%	272	1.02%	4,627	17.35%	26,661
Wilson	3,443	51.91%	3,097	46.70%	73	1.10%	19	0.29%	346	5.21%	6,632
Winkler	2,160	66.83%	1,021	31.59%	35	1.08%	16	0.50%	1,139	35.24%	3,232
Wise	4,350	47.26%	4,674	50.78%	108	1.17%	73	0.79%	-324	-3.52%	9,205
Wood	4,515	52.07%	4,033	46.51%	74	0.85%	49	0.57%	482	5.56%	8,671
Yoakum	1,937	71.90%	715	26.54%	28	1.04%	14	0.52%	1,222	45.36%	2,694
Young	4,153	59.14%	2,740	39.02%	84	1.20%	45	0.64%	1,413	20.12%	7,022
Zapata	874	41.01%	1,218	57.16%	19	0.89%	20	0.94%	-344	-16.15%	2,131
Zavala	831	23.49%	2,621	74.08%	69	1.95%	17	0.48%	-1,790	-50.59%	3,538
Totals	2,510,705	55.28%	1,881,147	41.42%	111,613	2.46%	38,172	0.84%	629,558	13.86%	4,541,637

==== Counties that flipped from Democratic to Republican ====
- Anderson
- Aransas
- Archer
- Armstrong
- Atascosa
- Bailey
- Bee
- Bell
- Bexar
- Borden
- Bsoque
- Bowie
- Brazoria
- Briscoe
- Brown
- Burnet
- Calhoun
- Callahan
- Carson
- Castro
- Chambers
- Childress
- Cochran
- Coleman
- Collingsworth
- Colorado
- Coryell
- Crockett
- Culberson
- Dallam
- Donley
- Eastland
- Ellis
- El Paso
- Fayette
- Floyd
- Gaines
- Garza
- Goliad
- Gonzales
- Grayson
- Hale
- Hall
- Hamilton
- Harrison
- Hays
- Hockley
- Hood
- Howard
- Hudspeth
- Hunt
- Jack
- Jackson
- Jeff Davis
- Johnson
- Karnes
- King
- Kinney
- Lamb
- Lampasas
- Lavaca
- Lee
- Live Oak
- Llano
- Lynn
- McLennan
- Martin
- Mason
- Matagorda
- Medina
- Menard
- Mitchell
- Moore
- Motley
- Oldham
- Panola
- Parker
- Parmer
- Real
- Reeves
- Shackelford
- Sherman
- Sterling
- Terry
- Terrell
- Val Verde
- Walker
- Wheeler
- Wichita
- Wilbarger
- Williamson
- Wilson
- Wood
- Young

== See also ==
- United States presidential elections in Texas
- Presidency of Ronald Reagan

== Works cited ==
- Black, Earl; Black, Merle (1992). The Vital South: How Presidents Are Elected. Harvard University Press. ISBN 0674941306.
