= Segraves =

Segraves is a surname. Notable people with the surname include:

- Robert Taylor Segraves (born 1941), American psychiatrist

== See also ==
- Segraves v. State of California, a 1981 case brought against California for teaching evolution
- Seagraves (disambiguation)
- Seagrave (disambiguation)
- Segrave (disambiguation)
