= Borden County, Texas =

County in Texas, United States

- County
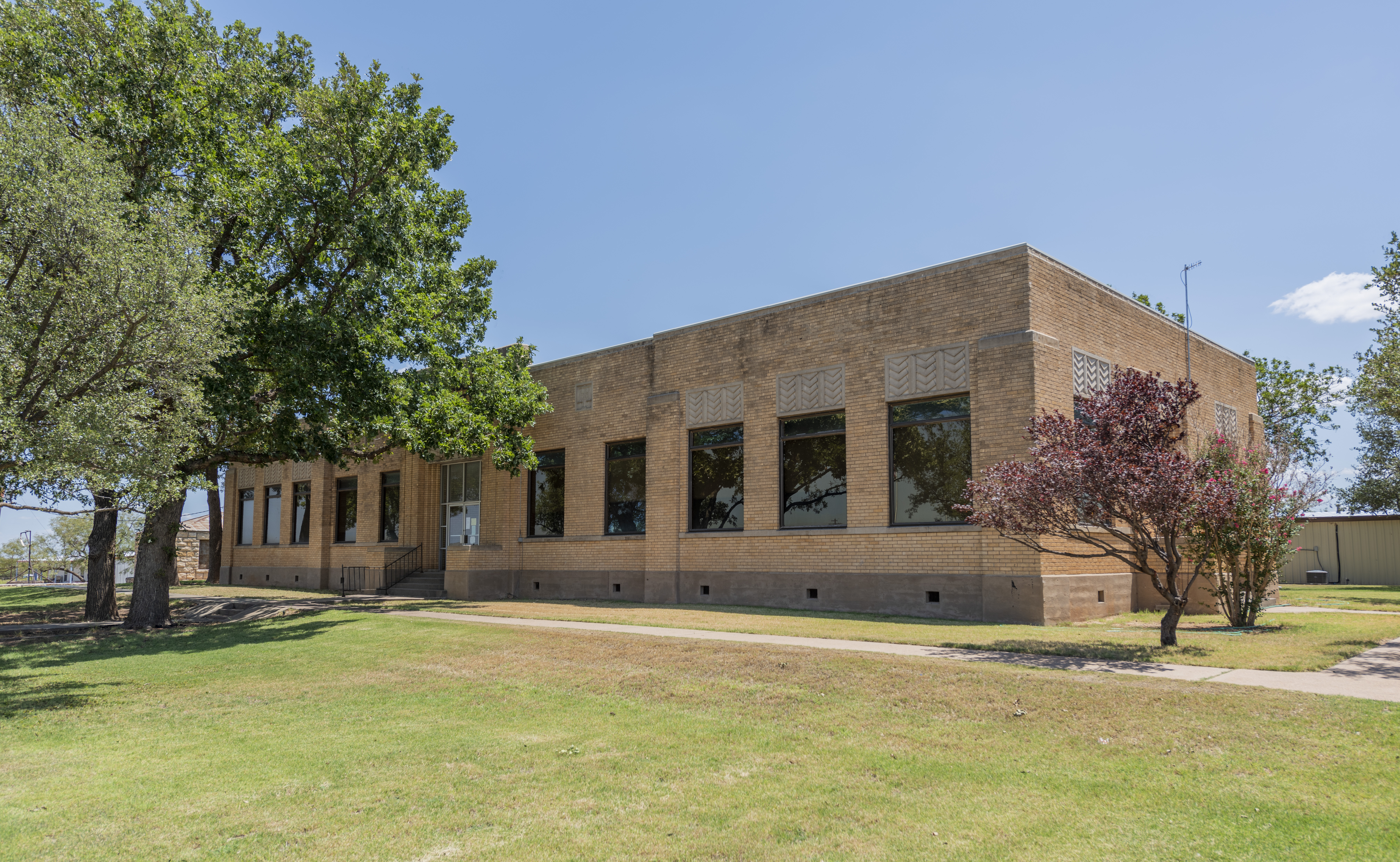
- Borden County Courthouse in Gail

- Location within the U.S. state of Texas
- Coordinates: 32°44′N 101°26′W
- Country: United States
- State: Texas
- Founded: 1876
- Named for: Gail Borden Jr.
- Seat: Gail
- Largest community: Gail

Area
  - Total: 906 sq mi (2,350 km^{2})
  - Land: 897 sq mi (2,320 km^{2})
  - Water: 8.6 sq mi (22 km^{2}) 1.0%

Population (2020)
  - Total: 631
  - Estimate (2025): 567 ▼
  - Density: 0.703/sq mi (0.272/km^{2})
- Time zone: UTC−6 (Central)
  - Summer (DST): UTC−5 (CDT)
- Congressional district: 19th
- Website: www.co.borden.tx.us

Borden County is a rural county located in the U.S. state of Texas. It is in West Texas and its county seat is Gail.

As of the 2020 census, its population was 631, making it the fifth-least populous county in Texas. Borden is one of three remaining prohibition or entirely dry counties in the state of Texas.

The county was created in 1876 and later organized in 1891. Gail and Borden County are named for Gail Borden Jr., businessman, publisher, surveyor, and pioneer of condensed milk.

== History ==
=== Native Americans ===
Shoshone and the Penateka band of Comanches were early tribes in the area.

=== County established ===
Borden County was created in 1876 from Bosque County and named for Gail Borden Jr., the inventor of condensed milk. Borden was publisher and editor of the Telegraph and Texas Register, as well as a political leader in the Republic of Texas. The county was organized in 1891, and Gail was made the county seat.

Farmers and ranchers settled the county, but the population remained relatively small. In 1902, Texas placed lands in the public domain and spurred a land rush in Borden County. Many of the newcomers grew cotton.

Borden County has had two courthouses, one built in 1890. The current courthouse is of brick and concrete construction and was erected in 1939. The architect was David S. Castle Co.

Oil was discovered in the county in 1949. By 1991, more than 340,000,000 barrels (54,000,000 m^{3}) of petroleum had been taken out of Borden County since its discovery.

== Geography ==
According to the United States Census Bureau, the county has a total area of 906 square miles (2,350 km^{2}), of which 897 square miles (2,320 km^{2}) are land and 8.6 square miles (22 km^{2}) (1.0%) are covered by water.

=== Major highways ===
- U.S. Highway 180
- Farm to Market Road 669

=== Adjacent counties ===
- Garza County (north)
- Scurry County (east)
- Mitchell County (southeast)
- Howard County (south)
- Martin County (southwest)
- Dawson County (west)
- Lynn County (northwest)

== Demographics ==
Historical population
Census	Pop.	Note	%±
1880	35		—
1890	222		534.3%
1900	776		249.5%
1910	1,386		78.6%
1920	965		−30.4%
1930	1,505		56.0%
1940	1,396		−7.2%
1950	1,106		−20.8%
1960	1,076		−2.7%
1970	888		−17.5%
1980	859		−3.3%
1990	799		−7.0%
2000	729		−8.8%
2010	641		−12.1%
2020	631		−1.6%
2025 (est.)	567	▼	−10.1%
U.S. Decennial Census; 1850–2010

=== 2020 census ===
As of the 2020 census, the county had a population of 631 and a median age of 46.1 years; 25.4% of residents were under the age of 18 and 21.4% of residents were 65 years of age or older. For every 100 females there were 110.3 males, and for every 100 females age 18 and over there were 97.1 males age 18 and over.

The racial makeup of the county was 91.3% White, 0.2% Black or African American, 0.2% American Indian and Alaska Native, <0.1% Asian, <0.1% Native Hawaiian and Pacific Islander, 1.7% from some other race, and 6.7% from two or more races. Hispanic or Latino residents of any race comprised 13.6% of the population.

<0.1% of residents lived in urban areas, while 100.0% lived in rural areas.

There were 256 households in the county, of which 37.5% had children under the age of 18 living in them. Of all households, 57.8% were married-couple households, 18.0% were households with a male householder and no spouse or partner present, and 20.7% were households with a female householder and no spouse or partner present. About 23.1% of all households were made up of individuals and 14.4% had someone living alone who was 65 years of age or older.

There were 359 housing units, of which 28.7% were vacant. Among occupied housing units, 72.7% were owner-occupied and 27.3% were renter-occupied. The homeowner vacancy rate was 1.0% and the rental vacancy rate was 1.4%.

=== Racial and ethnic composition ===
Borden County, Texas – Racial and ethnic composition Note: the US Census treats Hispanic/Latino as an ethnic category. This table excludes Latinos from the racial categories and assigns them to a separate category. Hispanics/Latinos may be of any race.
Race / Ethnicity (NH = Non-Hispanic)	Pop 2000	Pop 2010	Pop 2020	% 2000	% 2010	% 2020
White alone (NH)	624	539	528	85.60%	84.09%	83.68%
Black or African American alone (NH)	1	0	1	0.14%	0.00%	0.16%
Native American or Alaska Native alone (NH)	2	2	0	0.27%	0.31%	0.00%
Asian alone (NH)	0	1	0	0.00%	0.16%	0.00%
Pacific Islander alone (NH)	0	0	0	0.00%	0.00%	0.00%
Other race alone (NH)	0	0	1	0.00%	0.00%	0.16%
Mixed race or Multiracial (NH)	15	4	15	2.06%	0.62%	2.38%
Hispanic or Latino (any race)	87	95	86	11.93%	14.82%	13.63%
Total	729	641	631	100.00%	100.00%	100.00%

=== 2000 census ===
As of the census of 2000, 729 people, 292 households, and 216 families resided in the county. The population density was 0.80 people per square mile (0.31 people/km^{2}). The 435 housing units averaged 0.48 units per square mile (0.19/km^{2}). The racial makeup of the county was 90.53% White, 0.14% African American, 0.27% Native American, 6.31% from other races, and 2.74% from two or more races. About 11.93% of the population was Hispanic or Latino of any race.

Of the 292 households, 30.10% had children under the age of 18 living with them, 65.10% were married couples living together, 6.20% had a female householder with no husband present, and 25.70% were not families. Around 22.60% of all households consisted of individuals, and 9.20% had someone living alone who was 65 years of age or older. The average household size was 2.50 and the average family size was 2.93.

In the county, the population was distributed as 24.60% under the age of 18, 6.70% from 18 to 24, 27.40% from 25 to 44, 25.00% from 45 to 64, and 16.30% who were 65 years of age or older. The median age was 40 years. For every 100 females, there were 103.10 males. For every 100 females age 18 and over, there were 108.30 males.

The median income for a household in the county was $29,205, and for a family was $36,458. Males had a median income of $25,556 versus $21,607 for females. The per capita income for the county was $18,364. About 14.00% of the population and 11.80% of families were below the poverty line. Of the total people living in poverty, 14.30% were under the age of 18 and 11.60% were 65 or older.

The largest self-reported ancestry groups in Borden County are: · English – 17% · Irish – 15% · German – 12% · Mexican – 9% · French (except Basque) – 3% · Scotch-Irish – 3% · Other Hispanic or Latino – 3% · Scottish – 2% · Spanish – 1% · American Indian tribes, specified – 1%

== Education ==
The county is served mostly by Borden County Independent School District, with remaining portions in the Sands Consolidated Independent School District.

The Texas Legislature designated the county as being in the Western Texas College District.

=== Higher education ===
Texas A&M University operates the Borden County AgriLife. Through AgriLife, Texas A&M provides countywide agricultural, life sciences, and natural resources education.

== Media ==
The weekly newspaper, the Borden Star, covers events for the school and county.

The county is served by nearby radio stations KBXJ (FM) and KPET (AM), and the various Midland and Odessa radio and TV stations.

== Communities ==
- Gail (county seat)
- Mesquite (ghost town)
- Plains

== Gallery ==
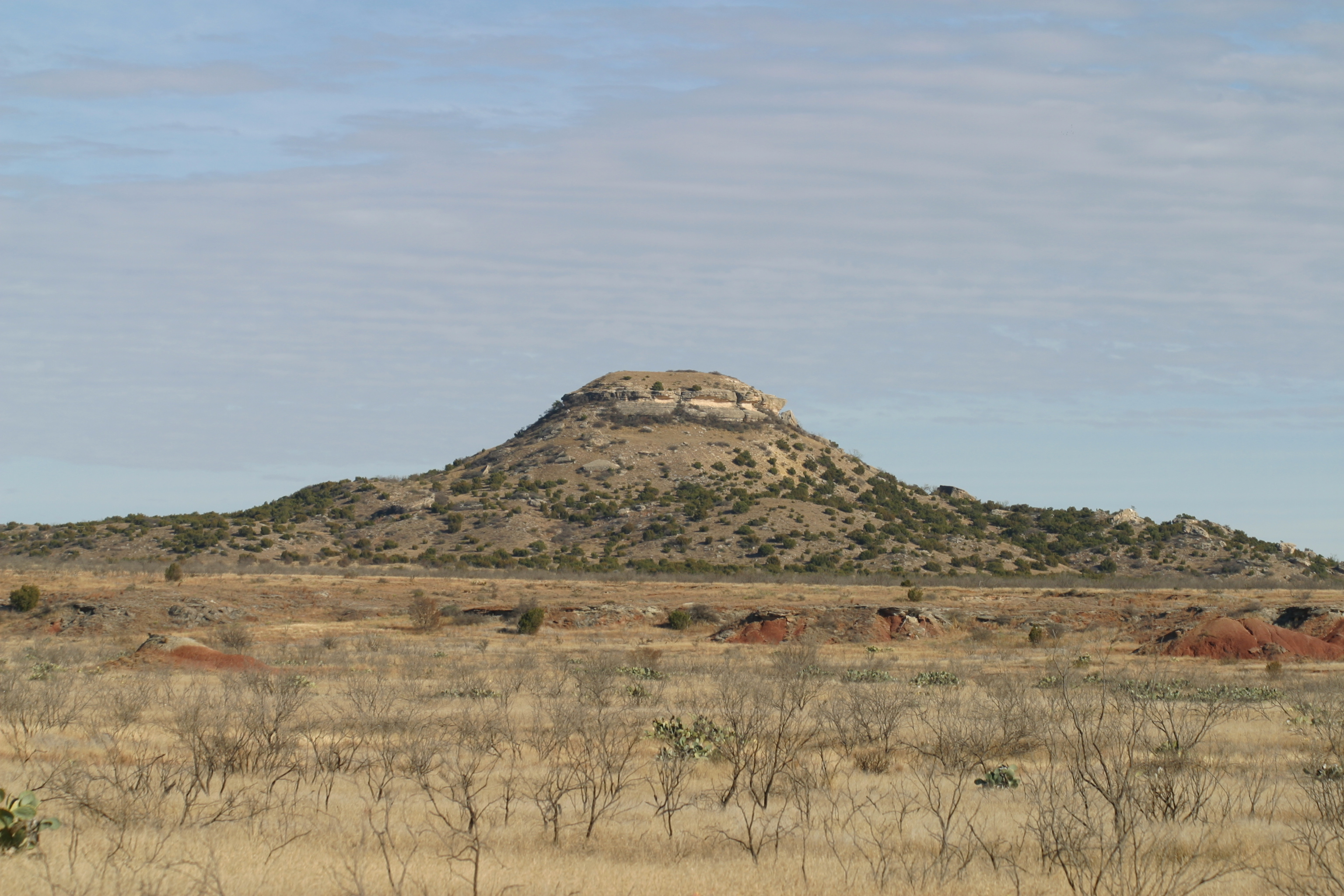
Mushaway Peak viewed from Willow Valley Road

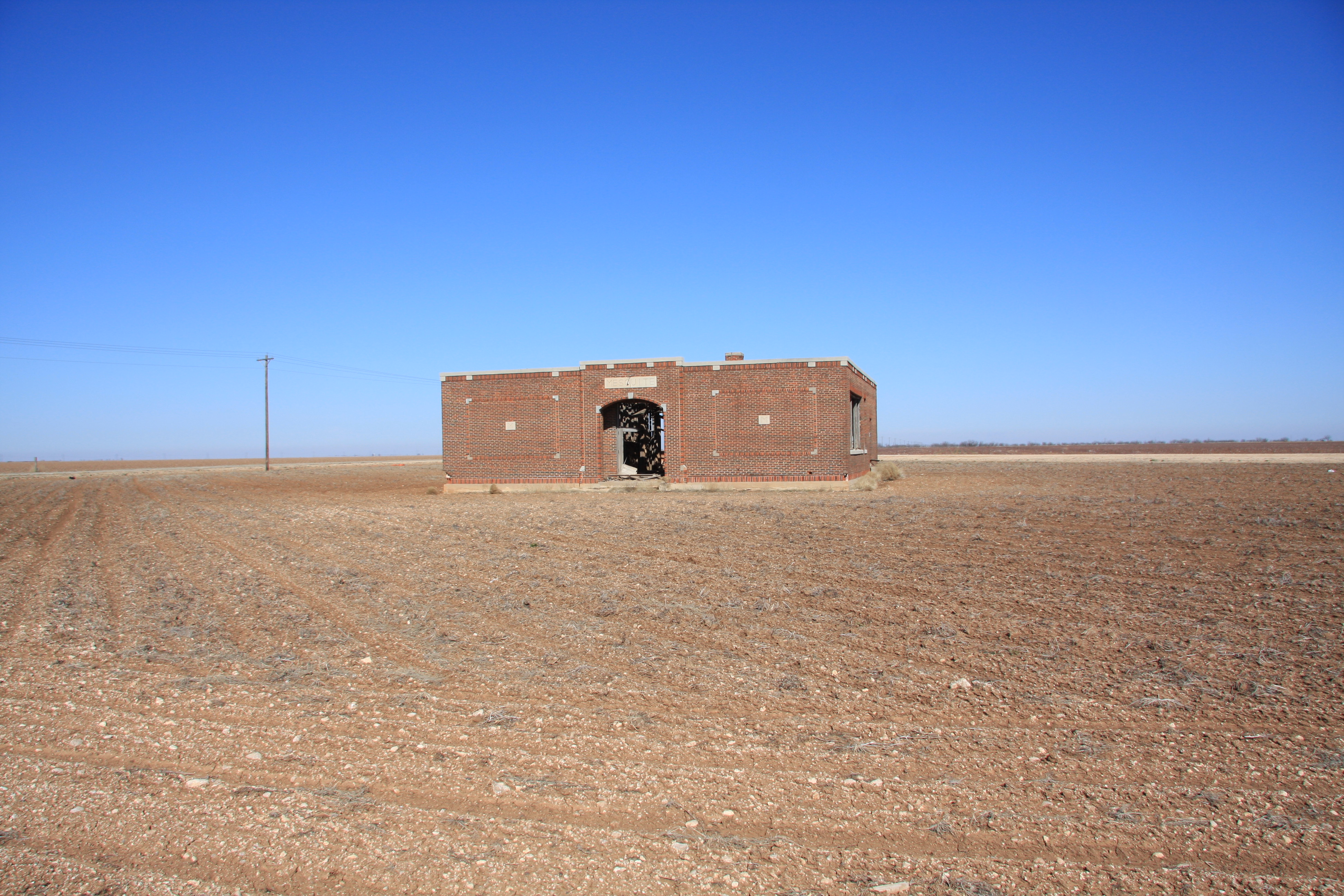
Abandoned schoolhouse in the ghost town of Mesquite

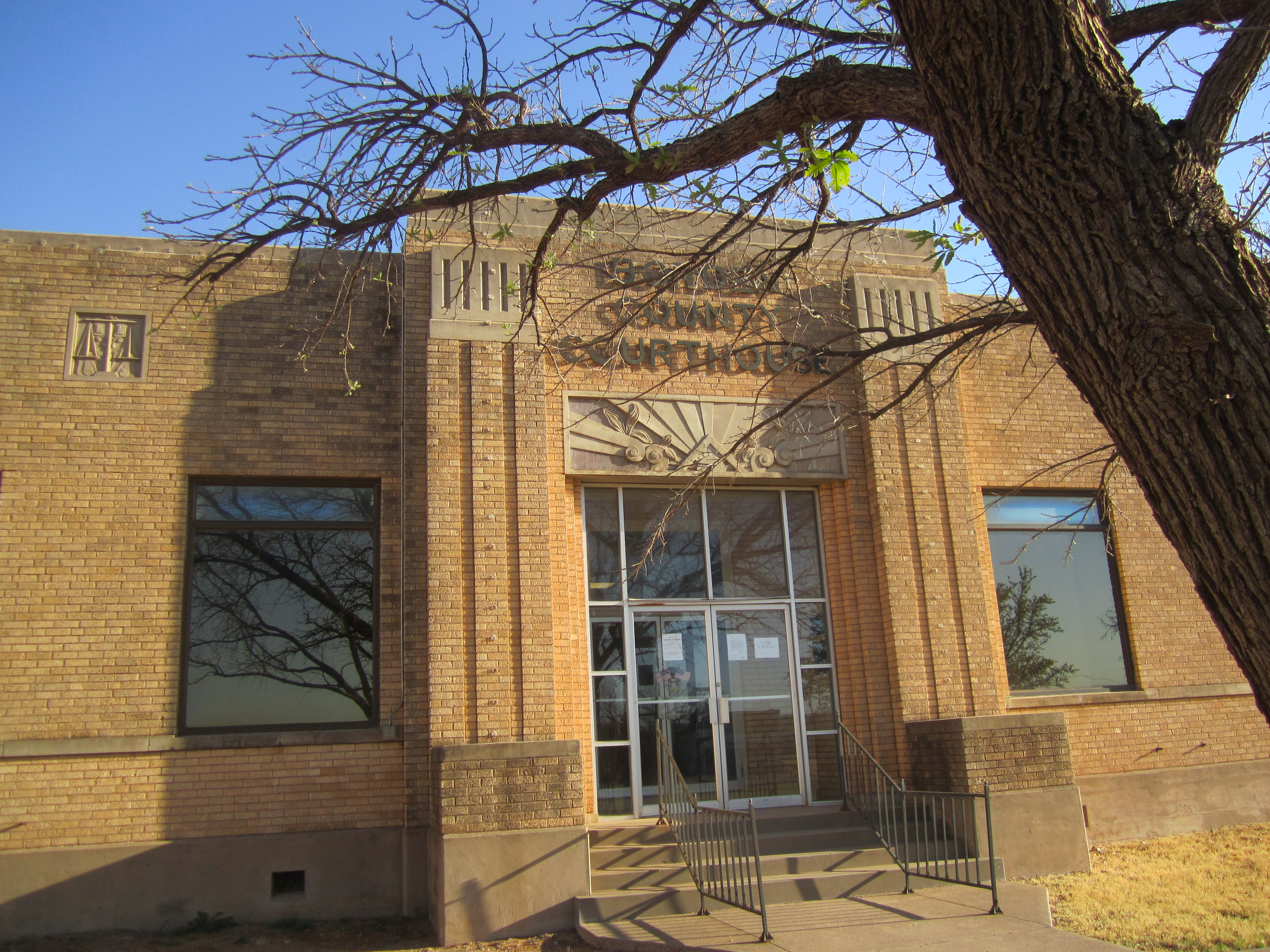
Frontal view of Borden County Courthouse

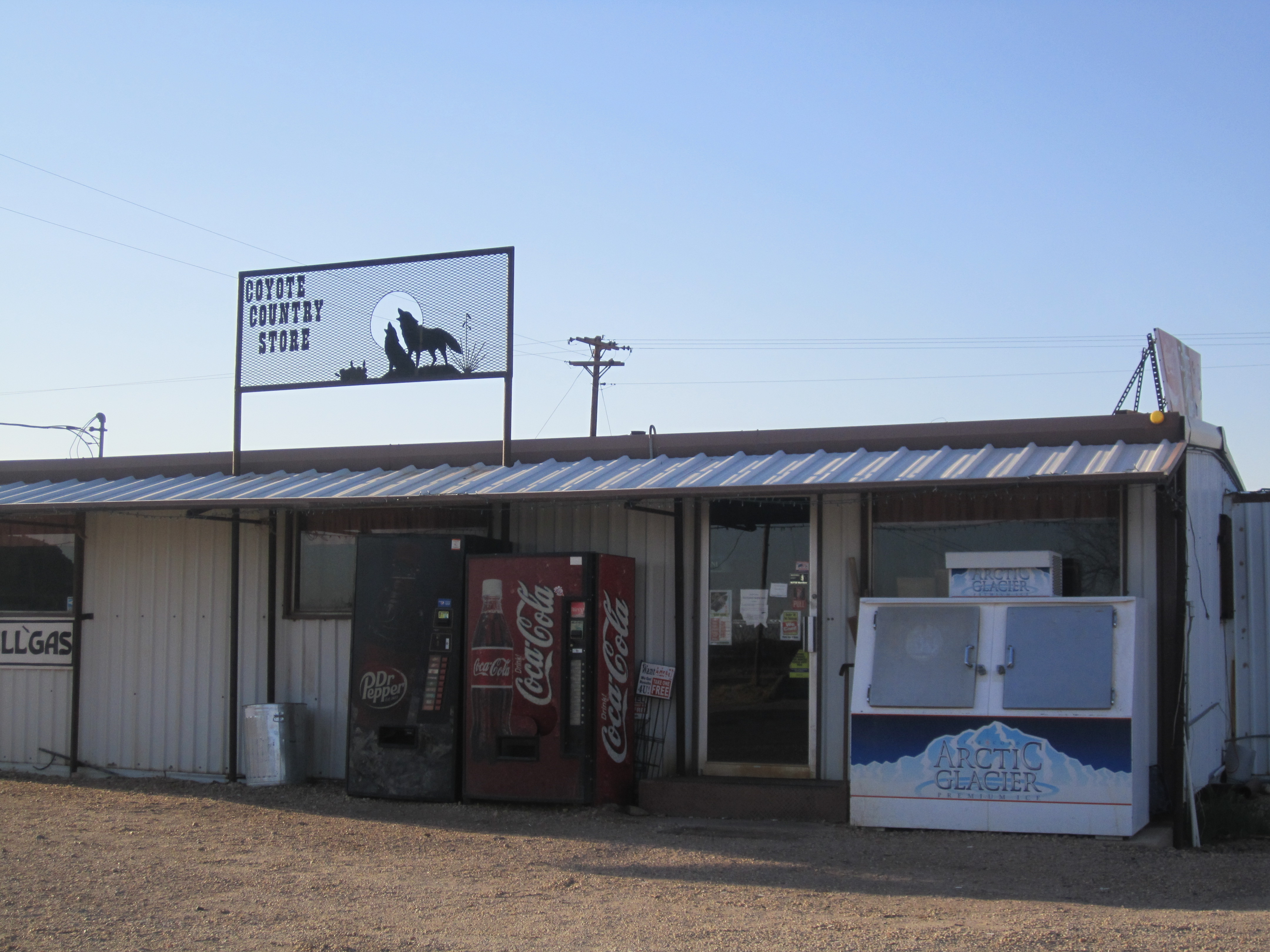
Coyote Country Store across from the courthouse is one of the few businesses in Borden County

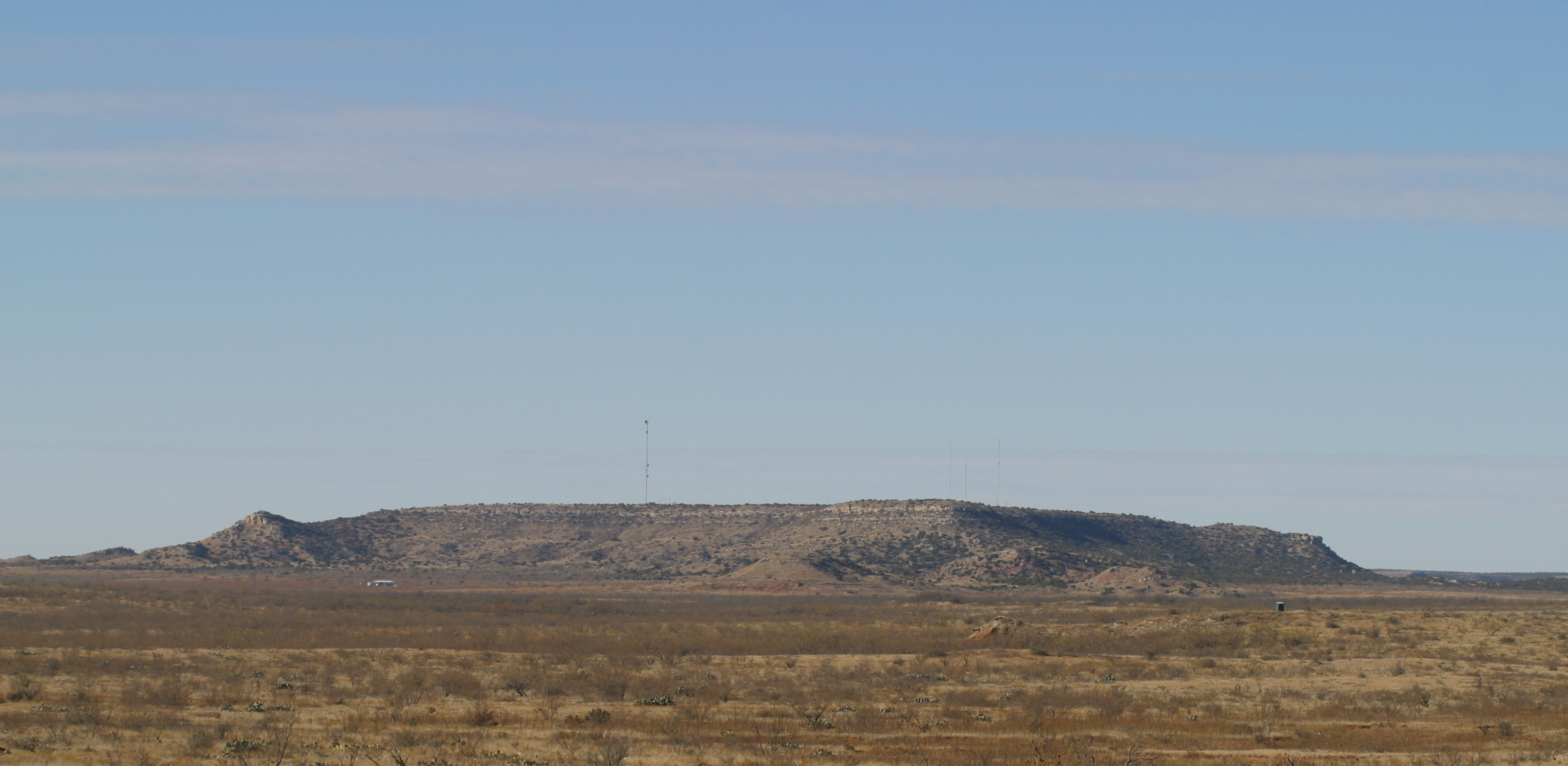
Gail Mountain viewed from Willow Valley Road

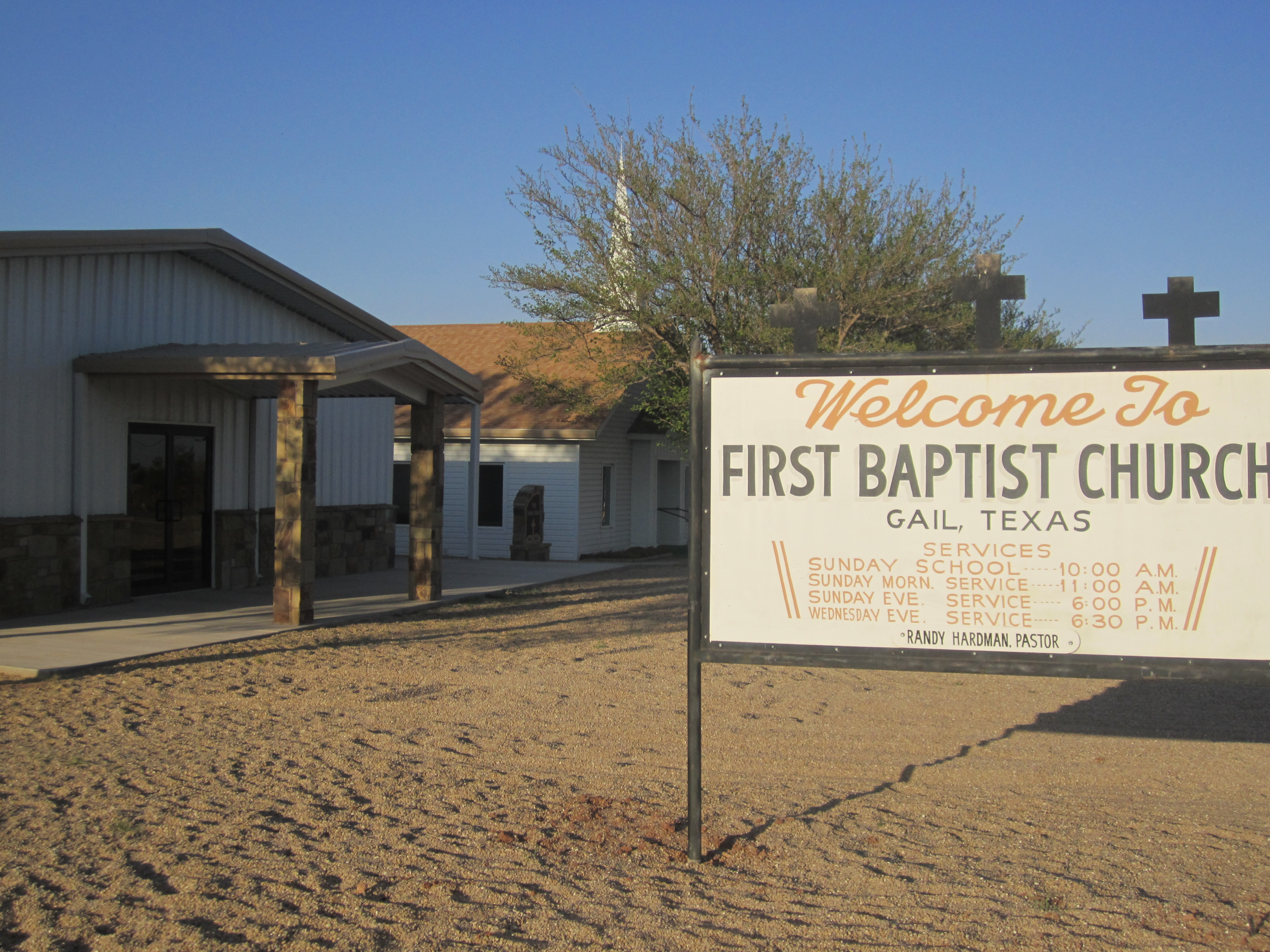
First Baptist Church in Gail

== Politics ==
Borden County was Donald Trump's second strongest county in 2020, only slightly edged out by Roberts County in the same state.

Borden County is located within District 83 of the Texas House of Representatives. Borden County is located within District 31 of the Texas Senate.

United States presidential election results for Borden County, Texas
Year	Republican		Democratic		Third party(ies)	
Year	No.	%	No.	%	No.	%
1912	1	0.76%	128	97.71%	2	1.53%
1916	1	1.10%	84	92.31%	6	6.59%
1920	4	3.81%	89	84.76%	12	11.43%
1924	10	10.42%	86	89.58%	0	0.00%
1928	98	57.31%	73	42.69%	0	0.00%
1932	7	2.81%	242	97.19%	0	0.00%
1936	26	10.48%	220	88.71%	2	0.81%
1940	44	10.50%	375	89.50%	0	0.00%
1944	34	11.04%	237	76.95%	37	12.01%
1948	18	7.73%	203	87.12%	12	5.15%
1952	182	46.43%	210	53.57%	0	0.00%
1956	127	34.51%	240	65.22%	1	0.27%
1960	166	40.39%	230	55.96%	15	3.65%
1964	152	36.28%	266	63.48%	1	0.24%
1968	117	30.31%	157	40.67%	112	29.02%
1972	330	76.21%	96	22.17%	7	1.62%
1976	150	38.46%	234	60.00%	6	1.54%
1980	279	67.23%	131	31.57%	5	1.20%
1984	325	69.44%	140	29.91%	3	0.64%
1988	283	62.33%	169	37.22%	2	0.44%
1992	184	48.68%	106	28.04%	88	23.28%
1996	194	58.08%	93	27.84%	47	14.07%
2000	283	80.17%	62	17.56%	8	2.27%
2004	303	84.40%	55	15.32%	1	0.28%
2008	316	87.53%	40	11.08%	5	1.39%
2012	324	89.26%	32	8.82%	7	1.93%
2016	330	90.41%	31	8.49%	4	1.10%
2020	397	95.43%	16	3.85%	3	0.72%
2024	370	95.61%	16	4.13%	1	0.26%

United States Senate election results for Borden County, Texas1
Year	Republican		Democratic		Third party(ies)	
Year	No.	%	No.	%	No.	%
2024	366	95.56%	13	3.39%	4	1.04%

United States Senate election results for Borden County, Texas2
Year	Republican		Democratic		Third party(ies)	
Year	No.	%	No.	%	No.	%
2020	390	94.89%	18	4.38%	3	0.73%

Texas Gubernatorial election results for Borden County
Year	Republican		Democratic		Third party(ies)	
Year	No.	%	No.	%	No.	%
2022	306	96.53%	9	2.84%	2	0.63%

== See also ==
- Dry counties
- Recorded Texas Historic Landmarks in Borden County
