= Segrave =

Segrave is a surname and can refer to:

- Blackburn Segrave, a 1930s touring aircraft by Blackburn Aircraft
- Doris Segrave (1886-1968), Lady Segrave, former actress and singer
- Gilbert Segrave (1266–1316), bishop of London from 1313 to 1316, son of Nicholas, 1st Baron Segrave
- Henry Segrave (1896–1930), water and land speed record holder
- Hugh Segrave (died 1387), Lord Keeper of the Great Seal and Treasurer of England under Richard II of England
- John de Segrave, 4th Baron Segrave (1315–1353), married, as her first husband, Margaret, Duchess of Norfolk
- Lord Richard Seagrave, Duke Of Sealand (1985 - ) Lord of Hougun Manor, Duke of Sealand, Radio Presenter
- Nicholas de Segrave the younger (c. 1260 – 1322), "Lord of Stowe" and son of Nicholas, 1st Baron Segrave
- Nicholas de Segrave, 1st Baron Segrave (died 1295), English baronial leader
- Patrick Segrave, son of Richard (died after 1610), Irish judge who was removed from office for corruption
- Richard Segrave (died 1598), Irish judge
- Segrave Trophy, an award for innovations in transport named after Henry Segrave
- Stephen de Segrave (1171–1241), Chief Justiciar of England

== See also ==
- Baron Segrave, a title in the Peerage of England
- Segraves (disambiguation)
- Seagrave (disambiguation)
- Seagraves (disambiguation)
