= 1976 United States presidential election in Texas =

- November 2, 1976
- Turnout: 64.83% (of registered voters) ▼46.14% (of voting age population)

Nominee	Jimmy Carter	Gerald Ford
Party	Democratic	Republican
Home state	Georgia	Michigan
Running mate	Walter Mondale	Bob Dole
Electoral vote	26	0
Popular vote	2,082,319	1,953,300
Percentage	51.14%	47.97%

Carter
40–50%
50–60%
60–70%
70–80%
80–90%
Ford
50–60%
60–70%
70–80%
President before election
Gerald Ford
Republican
Elected President
Jimmy Carter
Democratic

The 1976 United States presidential election in Texas was held on November 2, 1976, as part of the 1976 United States presidential election. Texas was won by former governor Jimmy Carter of Georgia with 51.14% of the vote, giving him 26 electoral votes. This result made Texas about 1% more Democratic than the nation-at-large. He also beat the incumbent President Gerald Ford in the general election. To date, this remains the last time that a Democratic presidential candidate won Texas, and the last time Texas voted more Democratic than the nation-at-large.

Carter's southern roots as a former governor of Georgia struck a chord with many voters in Texas, along with strong anti-Republican sentiment following Watergate. Still, this was a relatively weak performance for a victorious Democratic candidate in Texas, and two factors can be identified. One was Carter's underwhelming performance in the more rural counties, and the second being President Ford's strong performances in Dallas and Harris counties, and some of their surrounding suburbs. The rise of the Republican Party in these areas would result in Ronald Reagan's win in the state four years later.

Carter won 191 of the state's 254 counties, including 74 which have never voted Democratic in any presidential race since: Martin, Grayson, Chambers, Motley, Gaines, Live Oak, Mason, Sherman, Colorado, Stephens, Lamb, Oldham, Floyd, Real, Fayette, Terry, Donley, Parmer, Dallam, Moore, Hale, Wheeler, Bailey, Armstrong, Hamilton, Goliad, Carson, Childress, Collingsworth, Wilbarger, Wilson, Castro, Eastland, Gonzales, Parker, Hood, Johnson, Anderson, Brazoria, Matagorda, Kinney, Medina, Wharton, Lavaca, Archer, Bosque, Aransas, Bell, Borden, Brown, Burnet, Callahan, Cochran, Coryell, Walker, Shackelford, King, Jeff Davis, Wichita, McLennan, Llano, Hockley, Garza, Hunt, Young, Wood, Jackson, Lynn, Howard, Ellis, and Lampasas.

Among white voters, 53% supported Ford while 46% supported Carter.

== Primaries ==
=== Democratic primaries ===
- Jimmy Carter - 47.65%
- Lloyd Bentsen - 22.20%
- George Wallace - 17.53%

=== Republican primaries ===
- Ronald Reagan - 66.36%
- Gerald Ford (incumbent) - 33.37%

== Results ==
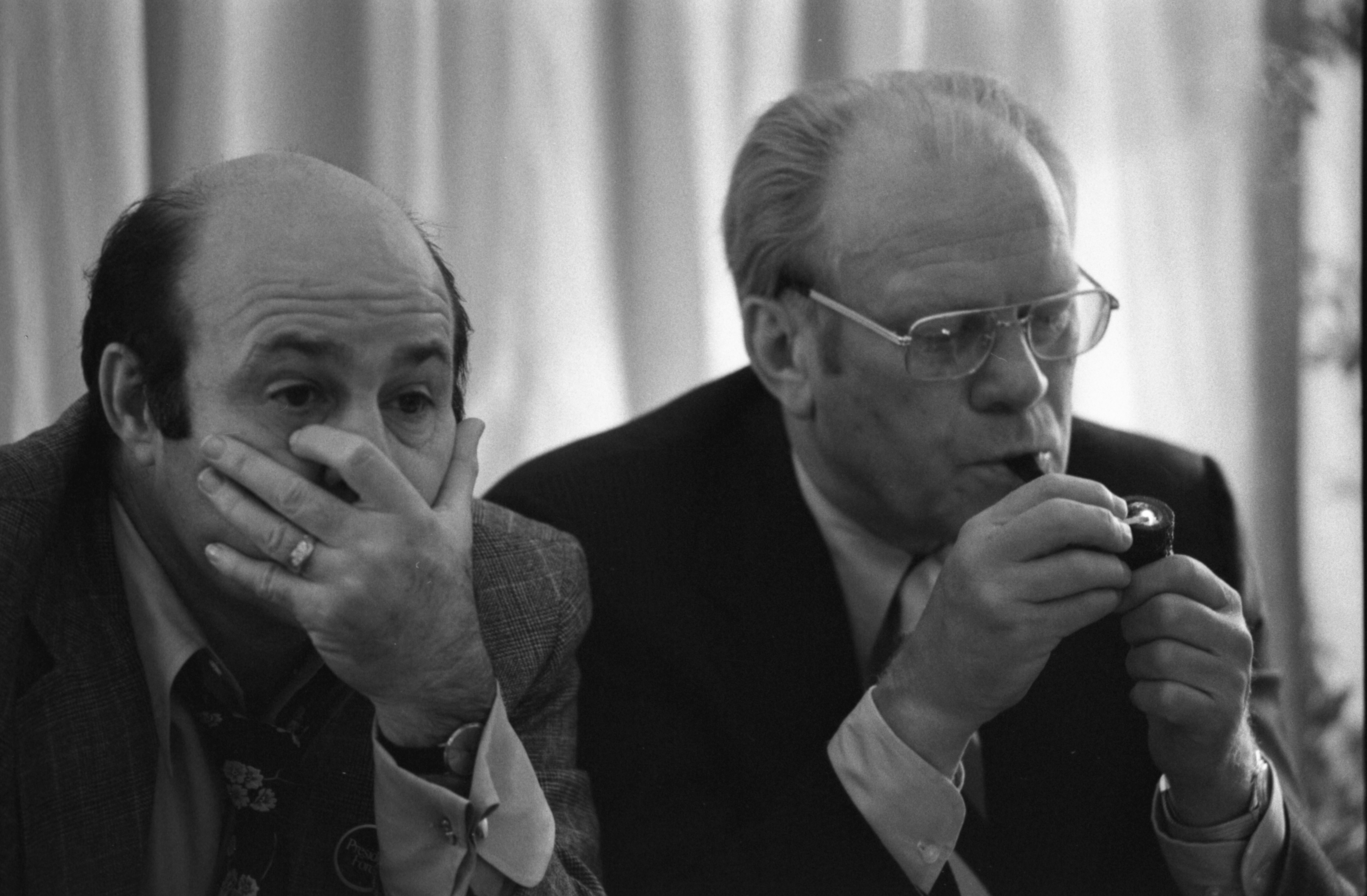
Gerald Ford (right) watching election returns with Joe Garagiola on election night in 1976. Garagiola is reacting to television reports that Ford had just been projected as having lost Texas to Carter.

1976 United States presidential election in Texas
Party	Candidate	Votes	Percentage	Electoral votes
Democratic	Jimmy Carter	2,082,319	51.14%	26
Republican	Gerald Ford (incumbent)	1,953,300	47.97%	0
Independent	Eugene McCarthy	20,118	0.49%	0
American	Thomas Anderson	11,442	0.28%	0
-	Other	4,705	0.12%	0
Totals		4,071,884	100.0%	26

=== Results by county ===
County	Jimmy Carter Democratic		Gerald Ford Republican		Various candidates Other parties		Margin		Total votes cast
County	#	%	#	%	#	%	#	%	Total votes cast
Anderson	5,499	56.60%	4,172	42.94%	44	0.45%	1,327	13.66%	9,715
Andrews	1,777	45.14%	2,127	54.03%	33	0.84%	-350	-8.89%	3,937
Angelina	9,750	56.98%	7,223	42.21%	139	0.81%	2,527	14.77%	17,112
Aransas	2,136	51.09%	1,985	47.48%	60	1.44%	151	3.61%	4,181
Archer	1,577	61.58%	966	37.72%	18	0.70%	611	23.86%	2,561
Armstrong	513	49.95%	506	49.27%	8	0.78%	7	0.68%	1,027
Atascosa	4,565	64.55%	2,415	34.15%	92	1.30%	2,150	30.40%	7,072
Austin	2,313	45.96%	2,686	53.37%	34	0.68%	-373	-7.41%	5,033
Bailey	1,356	51.62%	1,255	47.77%	16	0.61%	101	3.85%	2,627
Bandera	1,183	42.77%	1,554	56.18%	29	1.05%	-371	-13.41%	2,766
Bastrop	4,788	66.46%	2,383	33.08%	33	0.46%	2,405	33.38%	7,204
Baylor	1,335	62.68%	783	36.76%	12	0.56%	552	25.92%	2,130
Bee	3,690	54.89%	2,953	43.93%	79	1.18%	737	10.96%	6,722
Bell	17,499	53.17%	15,126	45.96%	287	0.87%	2,373	7.21%	32,912
Bexar	146,581	54.00%	121,176	44.64%	3,673	1.35%	25,405	9.36%	271,430
Blanco	923	47.19%	1,015	51.89%	18	0.92%	-92	-4.70%	1,956
Borden	234	60.00%	150	38.46%	6	1.54%	84	21.54%	390
Bosque	2,954	60.50%	1,912	39.16%	17	0.35%	1,042	21.34%	4,883
Bowie	12,445	56.02%	9,590	43.17%	179	0.81%	2,855	12.85%	22,214
Brazoria	21,711	52.01%	19,475	46.65%	558	1.34%	2,236	5.36%	41,744
Brazos	10,628	39.81%	15,685	58.75%	387	1.45%	-5,057	-18.94%	26,700
Brewster	1,227	46.76%	1,368	52.13%	29	1.11%	-141	-5.37%	2,624
Briscoe	823	73.55%	285	25.47%	11	0.98%	538	48.08%	1,119
Brooks	2,782	81.13%	641	18.69%	6	0.17%	2,141	62.44%	3,429
Brown	5,577	55.25%	4,483	44.41%	35	0.35%	1,094	10.84%	10,095
Burleson	2,924	71.65%	1,142	27.98%	15	0.37%	1,782	43.67%	4,081
Burnet	3,818	57.53%	2,777	41.85%	41	0.62%	1,041	15.68%	6,636
Caldwell	3,647	61.59%	2,235	37.75%	39	0.66%	1,412	23.84%	5,921
Calhoun	3,642	60.09%	2,377	39.22%	42	0.69%	1,265	20.87%	6,061
Callahan	2,241	58.00%	1,581	40.92%	42	1.09%	660	17.08%	3,864
Cameron	25,310	60.10%	16,448	39.06%	353	0.84%	8,862	21.04%	42,111
Camp	2,146	65.33%	1,133	34.49%	6	0.18%	1,013	30.84%	3,285
Carson	1,542	54.60%	1,269	44.94%	13	0.46%	273	9.66%	2,824
Cass	5,134	57.85%	3,712	41.83%	29	0.33%	1,422	16.02%	8,875
Castro	2,033	66.09%	1,007	32.74%	36	1.17%	1,026	33.35%	3,076
Chambers	2,927	60.33%	1,835	37.82%	90	1.85%	1,092	22.51%	4,852
Cherokee	6,509	62.20%	3,921	37.47%	35	0.33%	2,588	24.73%	10,465
Childress	1,578	60.09%	1,043	39.72%	5	0.19%	535	20.37%	2,626
Clay	2,568	67.88%	1,200	31.72%	15	0.40%	1,368	36.16%	3,783
Cochran	1,031	59.29%	701	40.31%	7	0.40%	330	18.98%	1,739
Coke	844	61.29%	517	37.55%	16	1.16%	327	23.74%	1,377
Coleman	2,264	57.24%	1,669	42.20%	22	0.56%	595	15.04%	3,955
Collin	14,039	39.00%	21,608	60.02%	353	0.98%	-7,569	-21.02%	36,000
Collingsworth	1,169	64.80%	629	34.87%	6	0.33%	540	29.93%	1,804
Colorado	3,028	49.84%	2,991	49.23%	56	0.92%	37	0.61%	6,075
Comal	4,068	38.54%	6,377	60.42%	109	1.03%	-2,309	-21.88%	10,554
Comanche	3,414	72.16%	1,297	27.41%	20	0.42%	2,117	44.75%	4,731
Concho	715	59.83%	474	39.67%	6	0.50%	241	20.16%	1,195
Cooke	4,483	48.05%	4,804	51.50%	42	0.45%	-321	-3.45%	9,329
Coryell	4,710	52.75%	4,140	46.37%	79	0.88%	570	6.38%	8,929
Cottle	1,047	76.93%	311	22.85%	3	0.22%	736	54.08%	1,361
Crane	664	39.52%	963	57.32%	53	3.15%	-299	-17.80%	1,680
Crockett	804	50.00%	802	49.88%	2	0.12%	2	0.12%	1,608
Crosby	2,176	70.38%	897	29.01%	19	0.61%	1,279	41.37%	3,092
Culberson	407	51.72%	373	47.40%	7	0.89%	34	4.32%	787
Dallam	1,029	51.27%	936	46.64%	42	2.09%	93	4.63%	2,007
Dallas	196,303	42.27%	263,081	56.65%	5,001	1.08%	-66,778	-14.38%	464,385
Dawson	2,162	46.46%	2,474	53.17%	17	0.37%	-312	-6.71%	4,653
Deaf Smith	2,613	48.08%	2,776	51.08%	46	0.85%	-163	-3.00%	5,435
Delta	1,563	78.50%	421	21.15%	7	0.35%	1,142	57.35%	1,991
Denton	18,887	47.58%	20,440	51.50%	365	0.92%	-1,553	-3.92%	39,692
DeWitt	2,540	47.68%	2,754	51.70%	33	0.62%	-214	-4.02%	5,327
Dickens	1,222	77.78%	343	21.83%	6	0.38%	879	55.95%	1,571
Dimmit	1,721	65.59%	890	33.92%	13	0.50%	831	31.67%	2,624
Donley	1,095	60.70%	704	39.02%	5	0.28%	391	21.68%	1,804
Duval	4,267	86.36%	661	13.38%	13	0.26%	3,606	72.98%	4,941
Eastland	4,320	64.53%	2,340	34.95%	35	0.52%	1,980	29.58%	6,695
Ector	10,802	35.62%	18,973	62.56%	553	1.82%	-8,171	-26.94%	30,328
Edwards	258	38.39%	412	61.31%	2	0.30%	-154	-22.92%	672
Ellis	9,991	58.58%	6,996	41.02%	68	0.40%	2,995	17.56%	17,055
El Paso	45,477	50.83%	42,697	47.72%	1,291	1.44%	2,780	3.11%	89,465
Erath	4,821	61.89%	2,925	37.55%	44	0.56%	1,896	24.34%	7,790
Falls	4,277	65.13%	2,261	34.43%	29	0.44%	2,016	30.70%	6,567
Fannin	5,845	73.20%	2,102	26.32%	38	0.48%	3,743	46.88%	7,985
Fayette	3,428	52.80%	3,030	46.67%	35	0.54%	398	6.13%	6,493
Fisher	1,993	77.37%	573	22.24%	10	0.39%	1,420	55.13%	2,576
Floyd	1,991	58.32%	1,402	41.07%	21	0.62%	589	17.25%	3,414
Foard	706	74.32%	240	25.26%	4	0.42%	466	49.06%	950
Fort Bend	11,264	39.13%	17,354	60.28%	169	0.59%	-6,090	-21.15%	28,787
Franklin	1,636	68.05%	758	31.53%	10	0.42%	878	36.52%	2,404
Freestone	2,679	61.43%	1,674	38.39%	8	0.18%	1,005	23.04%	4,361
Frio	2,598	66.48%	1,280	32.75%	30	0.77%	1,318	33.73%	3,908
Gaines	1,880	53.05%	1,643	46.36%	21	0.59%	237	6.69%	3,544
Galveston	37,873	59.42%	25,251	39.62%	611	0.96%	12,622	19.80%	63,735
Garza	957	55.48%	755	43.77%	13	0.75%	202	11.71%	1,725
Gillespie	1,260	25.79%	3,541	72.49%	84	1.72%	-2,281	-46.70%	4,885
Glasscock	190	46.00%	218	52.78%	5	1.21%	-28	-6.78%	413
Goliad	875	50.55%	846	48.87%	10	0.58%	29	1.68%	1,731
Gonzales	3,219	64.05%	1,789	35.59%	18	0.36%	1,430	28.46%	5,026
Gray	3,872	38.87%	6,010	60.33%	80	0.80%	-2,138	-21.46%	9,962
Grayson	17,015	58.48%	11,981	41.18%	99	0.34%	5,034	17.30%	29,095
Gregg	9,827	35.59%	17,582	63.68%	203	0.74%	-7,755	-28.09%	27,612
Grimes	2,656	64.03%	1,473	35.51%	19	0.46%	1,183	28.52%	4,148
Guadalupe	6,054	46.80%	6,766	52.31%	115	0.89%	-712	-5.51%	12,935
Hale	5,580	50.70%	5,390	48.97%	37	0.34%	190	1.73%	11,007
Hall	1,633	70.57%	671	29.00%	10	0.43%	962	41.57%	2,314
Hamilton	1,981	62.12%	1,176	36.88%	32	1.00%	805	25.24%	3,189
Hansford	983	40.86%	1,401	58.23%	22	0.91%	-418	-17.37%	2,406
Hardeman	1,403	63.06%	805	36.18%	17	0.76%	598	26.88%	2,225
Hardin	6,558	61.36%	4,046	37.86%	84	0.79%	2,512	23.50%	10,688
Harris	321,897	46.97%	357,536	52.17%	5,831	0.85%	-35,639	-5.20%	685,264
Harrison	7,796	49.85%	7,787	49.79%	56	0.36%	9	0.06%	15,639
Hartley	774	48.47%	811	50.78%	12	0.75%	-37	-2.31%	1,597
Haskell	2,512	74.78%	838	24.95%	9	0.27%	1,674	49.83%	3,359
Hays	7,005	54.41%	5,714	44.38%	156	1.21%	1,291	10.03%	12,875
Hemphill	707	44.80%	858	54.37%	13	0.82%	-151	-9.57%	1,578
Henderson	8,245	63.73%	4,658	36.01%	34	0.26%	3,587	27.72%	12,937
Hidalgo	35,021	64.15%	19,199	35.17%	373	0.68%	15,822	28.98%	54,593
Hill	5,327	66.32%	2,680	33.37%	25	0.31%	2,647	32.95%	8,032
Hockley	3,949	55.39%	3,137	44.00%	44	0.62%	812	11.39%	7,130
Hood	3,181	62.85%	1,857	36.69%	23	0.45%	1,324	26.16%	5,061
Hopkins	4,992	65.75%	2,556	33.67%	44	0.58%	2,436	32.08%	7,592
Houston	3,179	58.64%	2,229	41.12%	13	0.24%	950	17.52%	5,421
Howard	6,984	58.34%	4,899	40.92%	89	0.74%	2,085	17.42%	11,972
Hudspeth	479	54.37%	395	44.84%	7	0.79%	84	9.53%	881
Hunt	8,543	55.79%	6,676	43.59%	95	0.62%	1,867	12.20%	15,314
Hutchinson	3,691	37.16%	6,137	61.78%	105	1.06%	-2,446	-24.62%	9,933
Irion	297	49.17%	302	50.00%	5	0.83%	-5	-0.83%	604
Jack	1,814	63.18%	1,049	36.54%	8	0.28%	765	26.64%	2,871
Jackson	2,524	56.94%	1,884	42.50%	25	0.56%	640	14.44%	4,433
Jasper	5,422	63.00%	3,167	36.80%	18	0.21%	2,255	26.20%	8,607
Jeff Davis	309	50.91%	288	47.45%	10	1.65%	21	3.46%	607
Jefferson	47,581	59.07%	32,451	40.29%	514	0.64%	15,130	18.78%	80,546
Jim Hogg	1,645	79.32%	429	20.68%	0	0.00%	1,216	58.64%	2,074
Jim Wells	7,961	68.93%	3,547	30.71%	42	0.36%	4,414	38.22%	11,550
Johnson	10,864	59.93%	7,194	39.69%	69	0.38%	3,670	20.24%	18,127
Jones	3,318	61.26%	2,072	38.26%	26	0.48%	1,246	23.00%	5,416
Karnes	2,996	63.50%	1,675	35.50%	47	1.00%	1,321	28.00%	4,718
Kaufman	6,302	61.76%	3,867	37.90%	35	0.34%	2,435	23.86%	10,204
Kendall	1,190	31.37%	2,543	67.04%	60	1.58%	-1,353	-35.67%	3,793
Kenedy	139	67.80%	65	31.71%	1	0.49%	74	36.09%	205
Kent	474	73.26%	171	26.43%	2	0.31%	303	46.83%	647
Kerr	3,767	37.75%	6,021	60.34%	190	1.90%	-2,254	-22.59%	9,978
Kimble	759	46.51%	846	51.84%	27	1.65%	-87	-5.33%	1,632
King	100	50.76%	96	48.73%	1	0.51%	4	2.03%	197
Kinney	516	61.21%	318	37.72%	9	1.07%	198	23.49%	843
Kleberg	5,803	60.15%	3,771	39.09%	73	0.76%	2,032	21.06%	9,647
Knox	1,498	72.72%	551	26.75%	11	0.53%	947	45.97%	2,060
Lamar	8,601	65.78%	4,443	33.98%	32	0.24%	4,158	31.80%	13,076
Lamb	3,374	58.02%	2,413	41.50%	28	0.48%	961	16.52%	5,815
Lampasas	2,376	59.67%	1,563	39.25%	43	1.08%	813	20.42%	3,982
La Salle	1,294	65.25%	677	34.14%	12	0.61%	617	31.11%	1,983
Lavaca	3,458	57.98%	2,466	41.35%	40	0.67%	992	16.63%	5,964
Lee	1,937	58.64%	1,348	40.81%	18	0.54%	589	17.83%	3,303
Leon	2,085	63.94%	1,161	35.60%	15	0.46%	924	28.34%	3,261
Liberty	7,086	60.54%	4,552	38.89%	66	0.56%	2,534	21.65%	11,704
Limestone	3,825	64.83%	2,045	34.66%	30	0.51%	1,780	30.17%	5,900
Lipscomb	644	41.05%	911	58.06%	14	0.89%	-267	-17.01%	1,569
Live Oak	1,656	55.93%	1,287	43.47%	18	0.61%	369	12.46%	2,961
Llano	2,361	54.60%	1,947	45.03%	16	0.37%	414	9.57%	4,324
Loving	35	40.70%	47	54.65%	4	4.65%	-12	-13.95%	86
Lubbock	24,797	38.92%	38,478	60.40%	432	0.68%	-13,681	-21.48%	63,707
Lynn	1,575	57.13%	1,166	42.29%	16	0.58%	409	14.84%	2,757
McCulloch	1,888	58.87%	1,300	40.54%	19	0.59%	588	18.33%	3,207
McLennan	30,091	53.76%	25,370	45.33%	509	0.91%	4,721	8.43%	55,970
McMullen	194	47.20%	217	52.80%	0	0.00%	-23	-5.60%	411
Madison	1,885	63.66%	1,062	35.87%	14	0.47%	823	27.79%	2,961
Marion	1,860	58.73%	1,291	40.76%	16	0.51%	569	17.97%	3,167
Martin	907	56.06%	698	43.14%	13	0.80%	209	12.92%	1,618
Mason	814	49.63%	805	49.09%	21	1.28%	9	0.54%	1,640
Matagorda	4,971	56.94%	3,679	42.14%	81	0.93%	1,292	14.80%	8,731
Maverick	2,840	74.70%	924	24.30%	38	1.00%	1,916	50.40%	3,802
Medina	3,681	52.68%	3,252	46.54%	55	0.79%	429	6.14%	6,988
Menard	543	54.30%	441	44.10%	16	1.60%	102	10.20%	1,000
Midland	7,725	28.41%	19,178	70.52%	292	1.07%	-11,453	-42.11%	27,195
Milam	4,871	66.59%	2,404	32.86%	40	0.55%	2,467	33.73%	7,315
Mills	1,012	59.18%	684	40.00%	14	0.82%	328	19.18%	1,710
Mitchell	1,730	61.70%	1,058	37.73%	16	0.57%	672	23.97%	2,804
Montague	4,087	64.93%	2,182	34.67%	25	0.40%	1,905	30.26%	6,294
Montgomery	13,718	46.25%	15,739	53.07%	202	0.68%	-2,021	-6.82%	29,659
Moore	2,767	49.63%	2,759	49.49%	49	0.88%	8	0.14%	5,575
Morris	3,071	62.28%	1,843	37.38%	17	0.34%	1,228	24.90%	4,931
Motley	522	54.32%	428	44.54%	11	1.14%	94	9.78%	961
Nacogdoches	6,697	47.36%	7,315	51.73%	129	0.91%	-618	-4.37%	14,141
Navarro	6,995	63.20%	4,012	36.25%	61	0.55%	2,983	26.95%	11,068
Newton	3,468	77.03%	1,011	22.46%	23	0.51%	2,457	54.57%	4,502
Nolan	3,094	55.80%	2,431	43.84%	20	0.36%	663	11.96%	5,545
Nueces	52,755	61.11%	32,797	37.99%	773	0.90%	19,958	23.12%	86,325
Ochiltree	1,084	30.22%	2,471	68.89%	32	0.89%	-1,387	-38.67%	3,587
Oldham	554	60.81%	354	38.86%	3	0.33%	200	21.95%	911
Orange	15,177	61.99%	9,147	37.36%	160	0.65%	6,030	24.63%	24,484
Palo Pinto	5,170	65.40%	2,684	33.95%	51	0.65%	2,486	31.45%	7,905
Panola	3,731	53.48%	3,218	46.12%	28	0.40%	513	7.36%	6,977
Parker	8,186	63.12%	4,692	36.18%	91	0.70%	3,494	26.94%	12,969
Parmer	1,914	56.01%	1,487	43.52%	16	0.47%	427	12.49%	3,417
Pecos	1,971	46.56%	2,234	52.78%	28	0.66%	-263	-6.22%	4,233
Polk	4,384	62.93%	2,529	36.30%	54	0.78%	1,855	26.63%	6,967
Potter	11,917	45.77%	13,819	53.08%	300	1.15%	-1,902	-7.31%	26,036
Presidio	1,232	63.64%	687	35.49%	17	0.88%	545	28.15%	1,936
Rains	1,339	72.18%	510	27.49%	6	0.32%	829	44.69%	1,855
Randall	9,074	34.21%	17,115	64.53%	335	1.26%	-8,041	-30.32%	26,524
Reagan	563	45.62%	666	53.97%	5	0.41%	-103	-8.35%	1,234
Real	510	52.63%	448	46.23%	11	1.14%	62	6.40%	969
Red River	3,670	66.33%	1,852	33.47%	11	0.20%	1,818	32.86%	5,533
Reeves	2,613	60.18%	1,711	39.41%	18	0.41%	902	20.77%	4,342
Refugio	2,218	58.91%	1,537	40.82%	10	0.27%	681	18.09%	3,765
Roberts	202	35.94%	350	62.28%	10	1.78%	-148	-26.34%	562
Robertson	3,741	74.88%	1,244	24.90%	11	0.22%	2,497	49.98%	4,996
Rockwall	1,828	46.44%	2,087	53.02%	21	0.53%	-259	-6.58%	3,936
Runnels	2,068	48.30%	2,203	51.45%	11	0.26%	-135	-3.15%	4,282
Rusk	6,063	46.95%	6,800	52.65%	52	0.40%	-737	-5.70%	12,915
Sabine	2,391	72.54%	904	27.43%	1	0.03%	1,487	45.11%	3,296
San Augustine	1,817	63.31%	1,047	36.48%	6	0.21%	770	26.83%	2,870
San Jacinto	2,406	68.18%	1,094	31.00%	29	0.82%	1,312	37.18%	3,529
San Patricio	9,469	61.51%	5,853	38.02%	73	0.47%	3,616	23.49%	15,395
San Saba	1,408	70.22%	582	29.03%	15	0.75%	826	41.19%	2,005
Schleicher	468	47.13%	516	51.96%	9	0.91%	-48	-4.83%	993
Scurry	2,639	48.34%	2,797	51.24%	23	0.42%	-158	-2.90%	5,459
Shackelford	764	50.33%	748	49.28%	6	0.40%	16	1.05%	1,518
Shelby	4,680	63.35%	2,695	36.48%	12	0.16%	1,985	26.87%	7,387
Sherman	718	50.71%	679	47.95%	19	1.34%	39	2.76%	1,416
Smith	16,856	42.92%	22,238	56.62%	181	0.46%	-5,382	-13.70%	39,275
Somervell	1,054	75.77%	332	23.87%	5	0.36%	722	51.90%	1,391
Starr	4,646	87.25%	664	12.47%	15	0.28%	3,982	74.78%	5,325
Stephens	1,796	52.38%	1,621	47.27%	12	0.35%	175	5.11%	3,429
Sterling	174	45.67%	202	53.02%	5	1.31%	-28	-7.35%	381
Stonewall	812	75.89%	252	23.55%	6	0.56%	560	52.34%	1,070
Sutton	768	47.73%	831	51.65%	10	0.62%	-63	-3.92%	1,609
Swisher	2,811	78.59%	753	21.05%	13	0.36%	2,058	57.54%	3,577
Tarrant	122,287	49.18%	124,433	50.05%	1,911	0.77%	-2,146	-0.87%	248,631
Taylor	14,453	41.84%	19,822	57.38%	268	0.78%	-5,369	-15.54%	34,543
Terrell	321	50.00%	317	49.38%	4	0.62%	4	0.62%	642
Terry	2,859	57.17%	2,113	42.25%	29	0.58%	746	14.92%	5,001
Throckmorton	658	64.76%	356	35.04%	2	0.20%	302	29.72%	1,016
Titus	4,205	61.64%	2,603	38.16%	14	0.21%	1,602	23.48%	6,822
Tom Green	11,064	46.97%	12,316	52.29%	174	0.74%	-1,252	-5.32%	23,554
Travis	78,585	51.63%	71,031	46.67%	2,597	1.71%	7,554	4.96%	152,213
Trinity	2,100	66.58%	1,042	33.04%	12	0.38%	1,058	33.54%	3,154
Tyler	3,322	62.47%	1,965	36.95%	31	0.58%	1,357	25.52%	5,318
Upshur	4,902	59.70%	3,272	39.85%	37	0.45%	1,630	19.85%	8,211
Upton	686	43.95%	869	55.67%	6	0.38%	-183	-11.72%	1,561
Uvalde	2,299	42.19%	3,103	56.95%	47	0.86%	-804	-14.76%	5,449
Val Verde	4,603	56.46%	3,476	42.64%	73	0.90%	1,127	13.82%	8,152
Van Zandt	6,449	65.15%	3,385	34.20%	64	0.65%	3,064	30.95%	9,898
Victoria	7,326	43.02%	9,594	56.34%	108	0.63%	-2,268	-13.32%	17,028
Walker	5,105	50.19%	4,974	48.90%	92	0.90%	131	1.29%	10,171
Waller	2,828	58.17%	1,992	40.97%	42	0.86%	836	17.20%	4,862
Ward	2,046	48.51%	2,123	50.33%	49	1.16%	-77	-1.82%	4,218
Washington	2,635	40.54%	3,820	58.77%	45	0.69%	-1,185	-18.23%	6,500
Webb	10,362	70.50%	4,222	28.72%	114	0.78%	6,140	41.78%	14,698
Wharton	5,914	55.56%	4,682	43.99%	48	0.45%	1,232	11.57%	10,644
Wheeler	1,598	55.33%	1,273	44.08%	17	0.59%	325	11.25%	2,888
Wichita	22,017	53.35%	19,024	46.10%	225	0.55%	2,993	7.25%	41,266
Wilbarger	3,280	59.90%	2,145	39.17%	51	0.93%	1,135	20.73%	5,476
Willacy	2,984	65.48%	1,542	33.84%	31	0.68%	1,442	31.64%	4,557
Williamson	9,355	55.00%	7,481	43.98%	174	1.02%	1,874	11.02%	17,010
Wilson	3,973	67.32%	1,926	32.63%	3	0.05%	2,047	34.69%	5,902
Winkler	1,382	42.31%	1,842	56.40%	42	1.29%	-460	-14.09%	3,266
Wise	5,133	64.06%	2,856	35.64%	24	0.30%	2,277	28.42%	8,013
Wood	4,107	56.84%	3,076	42.57%	43	0.60%	1,031	14.27%	7,226
Yoakum	1,181	44.07%	1,477	55.11%	22	0.82%	-296	-11.04%	2,680
Young	3,473	56.33%	2,652	43.01%	41	0.66%	821	13.32%	6,166
Zapata	1,216	72.29%	462	27.47%	4	0.24%	754	44.82%	1,682
Zavala	1,822	70.67%	735	28.51%	21	0.81%	1,087	42.16%	2,578
Totals	2,082,319	51.14%	1,953,300	47.97%	36,265	0.89%	129,019	3.17%	4,071,884

==== Counties that flipped from Republican to Democratic ====
- Anderson
- Aransas
- Archer
- Armstrong
- Atascosa
- Bailey
- Bee
- Bell
- Bexar
- Borden
- Bsoque
- Bowie
- Brazoria
- Briscoe
- Brown
- Burnet
- Calhoun
- Callahan
- Carson
- Castro
- Chambers
- Childress
- Cochran
- Coleman
- Collingsworth
- Colorado
- Coryell
- Crockett
- Culberson
- Dallam
- Donley
- Dickens
- Dimmit
- Fisher
- Eastland
- Ellis
- El Paso
- Fayette
- Floyd
- Frio
- Hidalgo
- Gaines
- Garza
- Goliad
- Gonzales
- Grayson
- Jefferson
- Jim Wells
- Kenedy
- Hale
- Hall
- Hamilton
- Harrison
- Hays
- Hockley
- Hood
- Howard
- Hudspeth
- Hunt
- Jack
- Jackson
- Jeff Davis
- Johnson
- Karnes
- King
- Kinney
- Lamb
- Lampasas
- Lavaca
- Lee
- Live Oak
- Llano
- Lynn
- La Salle
- Morris
- Newton
- McLennan
- Martin
- Mason
- Matagorda
- Medina
- Menard
- Mitchell
- Moore
- Motley
- Oldham
- Orange
- Presidio
- Robertson
- Panola
- Parker
- Parmer
- Real
- Reeves
- Shackelford
- Sherman
- Sterling
- Stonewall
- Swisher
- Terry
- Terrell
- Val Verde
- Walker
- Wheeler
- Wichita
- Wilbarger
- Williamson
- Wilson
- Wood
- Willacy
- Zavala
- Young
- Angelina
- Bastrop
- Baylor
- Burleson
- Caldwell
- Cameron
- Camp
- Cass
- Cherokee
- Clay
- Coke
- Comanche
- Concho
- Crosby
- Delta
- Erath
- Falls
- Fannin
- Foard
- Franklin
- Freestone
- Galveston
- Grimes
- Hardeman
- Hardin
- Haskell
- Henderson
- Hill
- Hopkins
- Houston
- Jasper
- Jones
- Kaufman
- Kent
- Kleberg
- Knox
- Lamar
- Leon
- Liberty
- Limestone
- McCulloch
- Madison
- Marion
- Milam
- Mills
- Montague
- Navarro
- Nolan
- Nueces
- Palo Pinto
- Polk
- Rains
- Red River
- Refugio
- Sabine
- San Augustine
- San Jacinto
- San Patricio
- San Saba
- Shelby
- Somervell
- Throckmorton
- Titus
- Travis
- Trinity
- Tyler
- Upshur
- Van Zandt
- Waller
- Wise

=== By congressional district ===
Carter won 17 of the state's 24 congressional districts, while the other 7 were won by Ford, including 5 which elected Democrats.

District	Carter	Ford	Representative
1st	60.1%	39.9%	Sam B. Hall Jr.
2nd	58%	42%	Charles Wilson
3rd	27.3%	72.7%	James M. Collins
4th	50.8%	49.2%	Ray Roberts
5th	53%	47%	Jim Mattox
6th	51%	49%	Tiger Teague
7th	26.4%	73.6%	Bill Archer
8th	63.1%	36.9%	Bob Eckhardt
9th	59.2%	40.8%	Jack Brooks
10th	54.3%	45.7%	J. J. Pickle
11th	57.1%	42.9%	William R. Poage
12th	55.9%	44.1%	Jim Wright
13th	49.4%	50.6%	Jack Hightower
14th	58.1%	41.9%	John Andrew Young
15th	65.6%	34.4%	Kika de la Garza
16th	49.6%	50.4%	Richard Crawford White
17th	57.3%	42.7%	Omar Burleson
18th	75.6%	24.4%	Barbara Jordan
19th	42.3%	57.7%	George H. Mahon
20th	74.4%	25.6%	Henry B. González
21st	40.3%	59.7%	Bob Krueger
22nd	49.9%	50.1%	Robert Gammage
23rd	59.3%	40.7%	Abraham Kazen
24th	55.5%	44.5%	Dale Milford

== See also ==
- United States presidential elections in Texas

== Works cited ==
- Black, Earl; Black, Merle (1992). The Vital South: How Presidents Are Elected. Harvard University Press. ISBN 0674941306.
