= Seagraves High School =

Location
- 1801 Avenue K Seagraves, Texas 79359-0577; United States; 32.948930°N 102.572284°W

Information
- School type: Public high school
- School district: Seagraves Independent School District
- Principal: Daylan Sellers
- Grades: PK-12
- Enrollment: 512 (2023-2024)
- Colors: Red & Black
- Athletics conference: UIL Class AA
- Mascot: Eagle
- Yearbook: Talon
- Website: Seagraves High School

Seagraves High School is a public high school located in Seagraves, Texas, United States and classified as a 2A school by the UIL. It is part of the Seagraves Independent School District located in north central Gaines County. In 2015, the school was rated "Met Standard" by the Texas Education Agency.

== Athletics ==
The Seagraves Eagles compete in these sports -

- Baseball
- Basketball
- Cross Country
- Football
- Golf
- Powerlifting
- Softball
- Tennis
- Track and Field

=== State Titles ===
- Girls' Basketball -
  - 2005(1A/D1)^

^Also won Texas Cup.

==== State Finalist ====
- Football -
  - 1977(1A)

== Theater ==
- One Act Play
  - 1990(2A), 1992(2A)
