= Seagrave (disambiguation) =

Seagrave is a village and civil parish in the Charnwood district of Leicestershire, England.

Seagrave may also refer to:

Places

- Barton Seagrave, village and civil parish in the Kettering borough of Northamptonshire, England
- Seagrave, Ontario, a Canadian community in Scugog township

People

- Gordon Seagrave (1897 – 1965), Burmese missionary and author
- Jocelyn Seagrave (born 1968), American film and television actress
- Mabel Seagrave (1882–1935), American physician
- Sterling Seagrave (1937–2017), American historian

Other

- Seagrave Fire Apparatus, American manufacturer of fire apparatus

== See also ==
- Segrave (disambiguation)
- Seagraves (disambiguation)
- Segraves (disambiguation)
