= Loop Independent School District =

Independent school district in Loop, Texas

Coordinates: 32.9086°N 102.4164°W

Loop Independent School District is a public school district based in the community of Loop, Texas, United States.

Located in Gaines County, a small portion of the district extends into Terry County.

Loop ISD has one school that serves students in prekindergarten through grade 12.

== Academic achievement ==
In 2010, the school district was rated "exemplary" by the Texas Education Agency.

== Special programs ==
=== Athletics ===
Loop High School plays six-man football.

=== Band ===
Loop High School is the smallest school in Texas that has a band program.

=== Vaccination rates ===
Notably, the measles vaccination rate for students in the Loop Independent School District fell from about 82% to about 47% since 2019.

== See also ==
- List of school districts in Texas
