= Chris Seagraves =

English footballer

Personal information
- Full name: Christopher Anthony Seagraves
- Date of birth: 7 October 1964 (age 62)
- Place of birth: Liverpool, England
- Height: 5 ft 9 in (1.75 m)
- Position: Full-back

Senior career*
Years	Team	Apps	(Gls)
1982–1984	Liverpool	0	(0)
1984–1985	Grimsby Town	23	(0)
1985–198?	Wealdstone		
- * Club domestic league appearances and goals

Christopher Anthony Seagraves (born 7 October 1964) is an English former professional footballer who played as a full-back.
