= Seagraves Independent School District =

School district in Texas

Seagraves Independent School District is a public school district based in Seagraves, Texas, United States.

Located in Gaines County, the district extends into small portions of Terry and Yoakum Counties.

In 2009, the school district was rated "academically acceptable" by the Texas Education Agency.

== Schools ==
- Seagraves High School (grades 9–12)
- Seagraves Junior High (grades 6–8)
- Seagraves Elementary (prekindergarten-grade 5)
