= Gaines County, Texas =

County in Texas, United States

- County
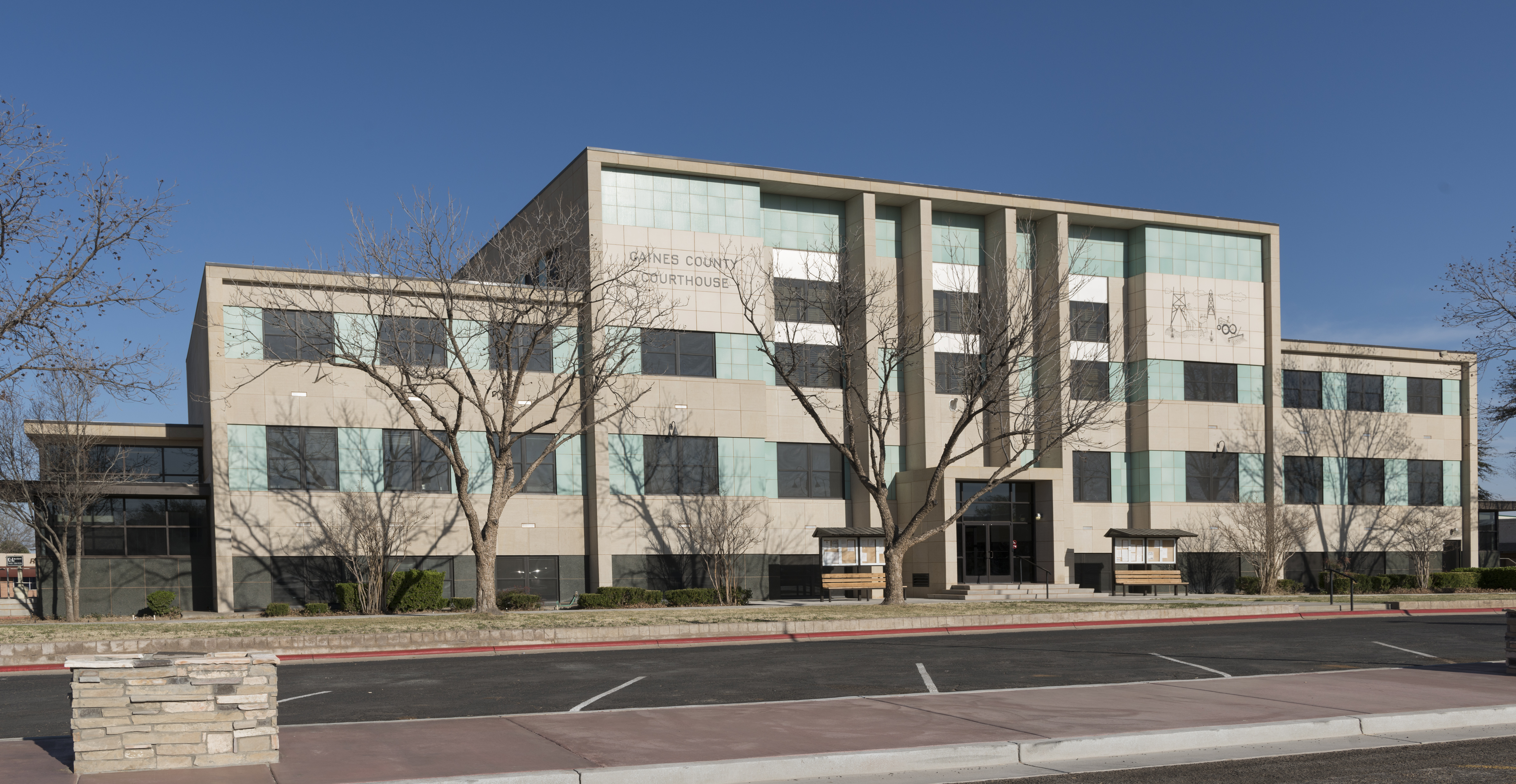
- The Gaines County Courthouse in Seminole

- Location within the U.S. state of Texas
- Coordinates: 32.74°N 102.64°W
- Country: United States
- State: Texas
- Founded: 1905
- Seat: Seminole
- Largest city: Seminole

Area
  - Total: 1,503 sq mi (3,890 km^{2})
  - Land: 1,502 sq mi (3,890 km^{2})
  - Water: 0.5 sq mi (1.3 km^{2}) 0.03%

Population (2020)
  - Total: 21,598
  - Estimate (2025): 23,956 ▲
  - Density: 14.38/sq mi (5.552/km^{2})
- Time zone: UTC−6 (Central)
  - Summer (DST): UTC−5 (CDT)
- Congressional district: 19th
- Website: www.co.gaines.tx.us

Gaines County is a county in the U.S. state of Texas. As of the 2020 census, its population was 21,598. The county seat is Seminole. It gained national attention in 2025 for a major outbreak of measles.

== History ==
The county is named for James Gaines, a merchant who signed the Texas Declaration of Independence and was born in Culpeper County, Virginia, in 1779. During the 19th century, the land had been occupied solely by Comanche and Mexican Comancheros, traders who had a thriving business with the Plains Indians. In October 1875, Lt. Bullis, who commanded the 24th Infantry Regiment, encountered a large group of Indians at Cedar Lake. Lt. Bullis captured them for food, supplies, utensils, and buffalo (American bison) hides. Then, Col. Shafter established a camp at Cedar Lake and continued to scout the area as far south as the Pecos River. That November, he came across a draw, where he discovered more than 70 wells reaching levels 4 to 15 feet deep. This area became a regular place to trade goods.

In 1887, the northern part of the county was occupied by the Mallet Ranch. The foreman, Dave Ernest, sold the ranch to a merchant from San Antonio, who used the land for driving cattle towards Kansas. On October 24, 1905, Gaines County became an organized county in Texas. Land donated by nonresident landowners became the town of Seminole, Texas, the county seat. In 1912, a small post office opened east of Seminole that would later become Loop, Texas, named after a local ranch brand. In 1917, the Santa Fe Railroad came through Blythe, Texas, but that name was changed to Seagraves after the company discovered it already had a town by the same name located on the line.

A large population addition to Gaines County came in 1977 when a group of conservative German-speaking "Russian" Mennonites from Mexico arrived to start farming and ranching. In 2005, Gaines County became the number-one oil-producing, cotton-producing, and peanut-producing county in Texas.

=== 2025 measles outbreak ===
In early 2025, Gaines County became the epicenter of a measles outbreak that would spread across Texas, New Mexico, Oklahoma, and Kansas. The outbreak was declared over as of August 18, 2025, the total number of cases in Texas was 762, with 414 of those cases being reported in Gaines County. Spreading across 34 additional counties, two deaths of children were reported. Typical of measles outbreaks, the burden of disease is heavier on the unvaccinated and children. This was the highest number of cases in Texas in the last 30 years, surpassing the total number of measles cases in the US in 2024, and the death was the first measles death in the US since 2015. The outbreak has been linked to outbreaks in New Mexico, Oklahoma, and Kansas. The vaccination exemption rate in Gaines County is among the highest in the state, with nearly one in five incoming kindergarteners in the 2023–2024 class not having received the MMR vaccine.

== Geography ==
According to the U.S. Census Bureau, the county has a total area of 1,503 square miles (3,890 km^{2}), of which 0.5 sq mi (1.3 km^{2}) (0.03%) is covered by water.

=== Major highways ===
- U.S. Highway 62
- U.S. Highway 180
- U.S. Highway 385
- State Highway 83
- State Highway 115
- State Highway 214

=== Adjacent counties ===
- Yoakum County (north)
- Terry County (north)
- Dawson County (east)
- Martin County (southeast)
- Andrews County (south)
- Lea County, New Mexico (west)

== Demographics ==
Historical population
Census	Pop.	Note	%±
1880	8		—
1890	68		750.0%
1900	55		−19.1%
1910	1,255		2,181.8%
1920	1,018		−18.9%
1930	2,800		175.0%
1940	8,136		190.6%
1950	8,909		9.5%
1960	12,267		37.7%
1970	11,593		−5.5%
1980	13,150		13.4%
1990	14,123		7.4%
2000	14,467		2.4%
2010	17,526		21.1%
2020	21,598		23.2%
2025 (est.)	23,956	▲	10.9%
U.S. Decennial Census; 1850–2010 2010 2020

=== 2020 census ===
As of the 2020 census, 21,598 people, 6,765 households, and 4,545 families resided in the county. The median age was 28.2 years; 34.6% of the residents were under 18 and 9.3% were 65 or older. For every 100 females, there were 102.2 males, and for every 100 females 18 and over, there were 99.3 males 18 and over.

The racial makeup of the county was 70.3% White, 1.3% Black or African American, 0.5% American Indian and Alaska Native, 0.3% Asian, <0.1% Native Hawaiian and Pacific Islander, 10.1% from some other race, and 17.4% from two or more races. Hispanic or Latino residents of any race comprised 38.9% of the population.

About 32.7% of residents lived in urban areas, while 67.3% lived in rural areas.

Of the 6,765 households in the county, 47.1% had children under 18 living in them, 63.2% were married-couple households, 14.8% were households with a male householder and no spouse or partner present, and 18.6% were households with a female householder and no spouse or partner present. About 18.1% of all households were made up of individuals, and 7.4% had someone living alone who was 65 or older.

The county had 7,642 housing units, of which 11.5% were vacant. Among occupied housing units, 76.2% were owner-occupied and 23.8% were renter-occupied. The homeowner vacancy rate was 1.7% and the rental vacancy rate was 13.2%.

=== Racial and ethnic composition ===
Gaines County, Texas – Racial and ethnic composition Note: the US Census treats Hispanic/Latino as an ethnic category. This table excludes Latinos from the racial categories and assigns them to a separate category. Hispanics/Latinos may be of any race.
Race / Ethnicity (NH = Non-Hispanic)	Pop 2000	Pop 2010	Pop 2020	% 2000	% 2010	% 2020
White alone (NH)	8,803	10,628	12,554	60.85%	60.64%	58.13%
Black or African American alone (NH)	304	261	241	2.10%	1.49%	1.12%
Native American or Alaska Native alone (NH)	37	46	42	0.26%	0.26%	0.19%
Asian alone (NH)	22	37	72	0.15%	0.21%	0.33%
Pacific Islander alone (NH)	0	0	3	0.00%	0.00%	0.01%
Other race alone (NH)	7	17	46	0.05%	0.10%	0.21%
Multiracial (NH)	119	124	239	0.82%	0.71%	1.11%
Hispanic or Latino (any race)	5,175	6,413	8,401	35.77%	36.59%	38.90%
Total	14,467	17,526	21,598	100.00%	100.00%	100.00%

=== 2000 census ===
As of the 2000 census, 14,467 people, 4,681 households, and 3,754 families were residing in the county. The population density was 10 people per square mile (3.9 people/km^{2}). The 5,410 housing units had an average density of 4 units per square mile (1.5/km^{2}). The racial makeup of the county was 80.28% White, 2.28% Black or African American, 0.76% Native American, 0.15% Asian, 0.01% Pacific Islander, 14.17% from other races, and 2.35% from two or more races. About 35.77% of the population were Hispanics or Latinos of any race.

Of the 4,681 households, 45.3% had children under 18 living with them, 67.7% were married couples living together, 8.8% had a female householder with no husband present, and 19.8% were not families. About 18.2% of all households were made up of individuals, and 8.6% had someone living alone who was 65 or older. The average household size was 3.07, and the average family size was 3.53.

In the county, the age distribution was 35.0% under 18, 9.50% from 18 to 24, 26.80% from 25 to 44, 18.40% from 45 to 64, and 10.30% who were 65 or older. The median age was 30 years. For every 100 females, there were 97.00 males. For every 100 females 18 and over, there were 94.0 males.

The median income in the county for a household was $30,432 and for a family was $34,046. Males had a median income of $29,580 versus $16,996 for females. The per capita income for the county was $13,088. About 17.30% of families and 21.70% of the population were below the poverty line, including 29.2% of those under 18 and 15.7% of those 65 or over.

== Media ==
The county is served by a twice-a-week newspaper publication, the Seminole Sentinel, as well as local radio stations KIKZ (AM) and KSEM-FM.

== Communities ==
=== Cities ===
- Seagraves
- Seminole (county seat)

=== Town ===
- Denver City (mostly in Yoakum County)

=== Census-designated place ===
- Loop

== Politics ==
Gaines County is located within District 88 of the Texas House of Representatives. Gaines County is located within District 31 of the Texas Senate.

United States presidential election results for Gaines County, Texas
Year	Republican		Democratic		Third party(ies)	
Year	No.	%	No.	%	No.	%
1912	0	0.00%	68	95.77%	3	4.23%
1916	0	0.00%	80	95.24%	4	4.76%
1920	9	6.29%	134	93.71%	0	0.00%
1924	37	8.39%	342	77.55%	62	14.06%
1928	312	69.03%	140	30.97%	0	0.00%
1932	44	7.83%	510	90.75%	8	1.42%
1936	42	5.79%	680	93.66%	4	0.55%
1940	197	11.53%	1,509	88.30%	3	0.18%
1944	173	11.76%	1,173	79.74%	125	8.50%
1948	207	11.54%	1,465	81.66%	122	6.80%
1952	1,350	46.47%	1,540	53.01%	15	0.52%
1956	1,244	44.76%	1,527	54.95%	8	0.29%
1960	1,520	49.98%	1,498	49.26%	23	0.76%
1964	1,153	36.02%	2,045	63.89%	3	0.09%
1968	1,401	39.68%	1,087	30.78%	1,043	29.54%
1972	1,923	73.26%	669	25.49%	33	1.26%
1976	1,643	46.36%	1,880	53.05%	21	0.59%
1980	2,390	65.37%	1,182	32.33%	84	2.30%
1984	2,714	76.82%	797	22.56%	22	0.62%
1988	2,265	62.81%	1,310	36.33%	31	0.86%
1992	2,138	54.36%	1,095	27.84%	700	17.80%
1996	1,812	56.73%	1,012	31.68%	370	11.58%
2000	2,691	77.80%	723	20.90%	45	1.30%
2004	3,540	85.01%	608	14.60%	16	0.38%
2008	3,385	83.23%	650	15.98%	32	0.79%
2012	3,484	85.69%	535	13.16%	47	1.16%
2016	3,907	84.57%	597	12.92%	116	2.51%
2020	5,355	89.31%	576	9.61%	65	1.08%
2024	5,840	91.02%	538	8.39%	38	0.59%

United States Senate election results for Gaines County, Texas1
Year	Republican		Democratic		Third party(ies)	
Year	No.	%	No.	%	No.	%
2024	5,700	89.52%	561	8.81%	106	1.66%

United States Senate election results for Gaines County, Texas2
Year	Republican		Democratic		Third party(ies)	
Year	No.	%	No.	%	No.	%
2020	5,118	88.85%	548	9.51%	94	1.63%

Texas Gubernatorial election results for Gaines County
Year	Republican		Democratic		Third party(ies)	
Year	No.	%	No.	%	No.	%
2022	3,761	91.44%	311	7.56%	41	1.00%

== Education ==
School districts serving Gaines County include:

- Loop Independent School District
- Seagraves Independent School District
- Seminole Independent School District
- Wellman-Union Consolidated Independent School District

Most of Gaines County is assigned to South Plains College's service area. The portion of the county in Seminole ISD is assigned to the Odessa College service area.

== Notable people ==
- Larry Gatlin, country music singer
- Tanya Tucker, country music singer

== See also ==
- Recorded Texas Historic Landmarks in Gaines County
