= Mesquite, Borden County, Texas =

Mesquite, Texas
- Ghost town
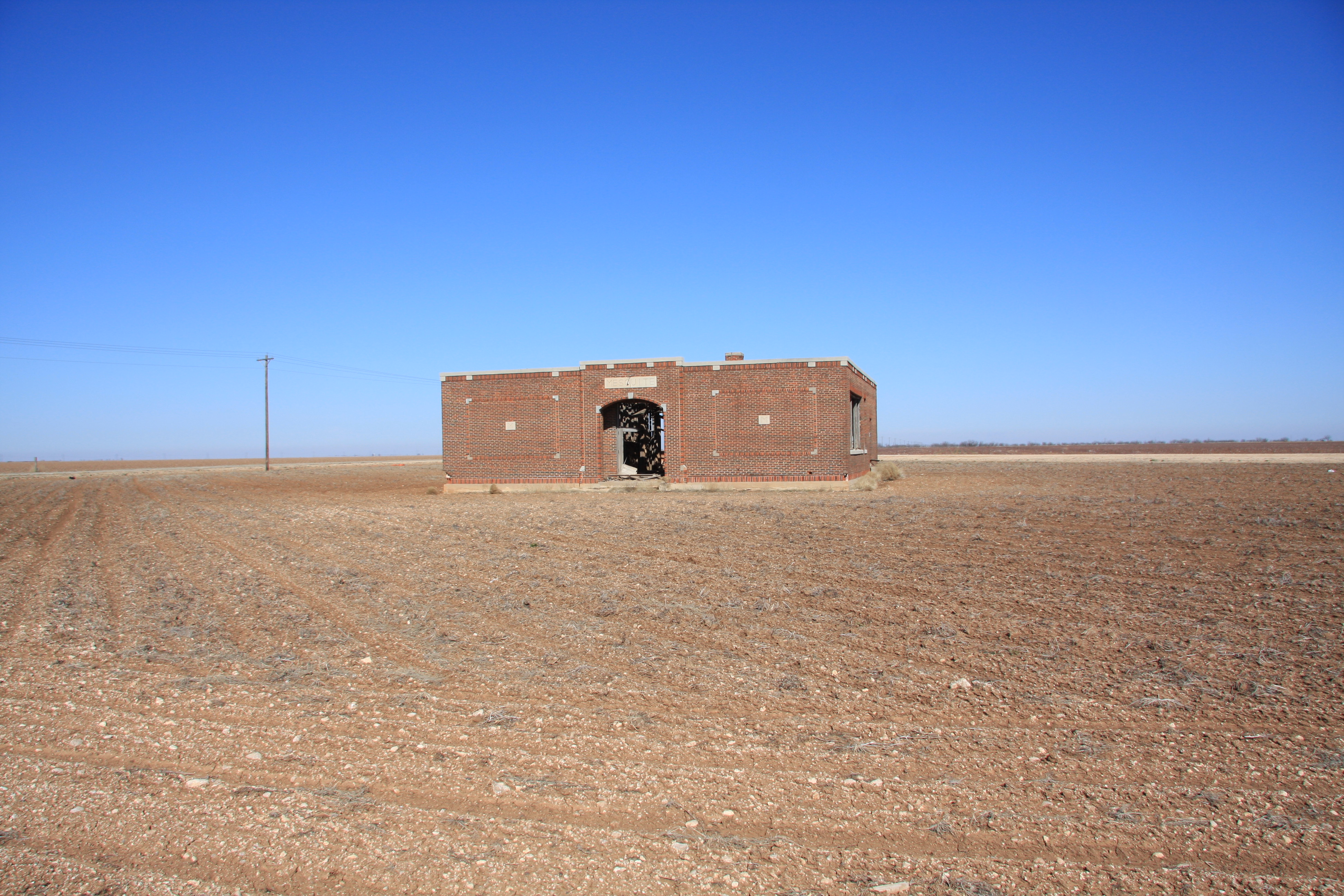
- Mesquite school (abandoned)

- Location within Texas Location within the United States
- Coordinates: 32°52′13″N 101°37′49″W
- Country: United States
- State: Texas
- County: Borden
- Physiographic region: Llano Estacado
- Founded: 1905
- Elevation: 2,966 ft (904 m)
- Time zone: UTC-6 (Central (CST))
  - Summer (DST): UTC-5 (CDT)
- Postal code: 79738
- Area code: 806
- Website: Handbook of Texas

Mesquite is a former town in Borden County, Texas, United States.

== History ==
From its inception, Mesquite remained a rural farming community. A school, established in 1905, served the area until 1952, after which the building appears to have been abandoned. Today, all that remains at the site of Mesquite are a Church of Christ, several scattered houses, and the abandoned schoolhouse.

The rest of the town appears to have been subsumed by private farms for cropland.

== Geography ==
Mesquite is located on Farm to Market Road 1054, east of US Route 87 and north of US Route 180. The nearest large community is Lamesa, approximately 15 miles (24 km) to the southwest. It is also located 16 miles (26 km) northwest of Gail, 55 miles (89 km) north of Big Spring, and 7 miles (11 km) south of the Lynn County line.

== See also ==
- List of ghost towns in Texas
- Close City, Texas
- Canyon Valley, Texas
- Rath City, Texas
- West Texas
