= Seagraves, Texas =

- City
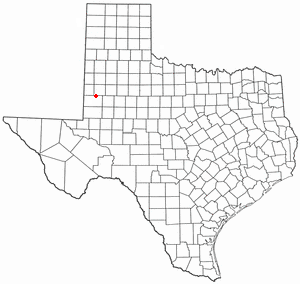
- Location of Seagraves, Texas

- Coordinates: 32°57′N 102°34′W
- Country: United States
- State: Texas
- County: Gaines

Area
  - Total: 1.45 sq mi (3.76 km^{2})
  - Land: 1.45 sq mi (3.76 km^{2})
  - Water: 0 sq mi (0.00 km^{2})
- Elevation: 3,353 ft (1,022 m)

Population (2020)
  - Total: 2,153
  - Density: 1,480/sq mi (573/km^{2})
- Time zone: UTC-6 (Central (CST))
  - Summer (DST): UTC-5 (CDT)
- ZIP code: 79359
- Area code: 806
- FIPS code: 48-66440
- GNIS feature ID: 2411850
- Website: http://seagravestx.us/

Seagraves is a city in Gaines County, Texas, United States. Its population was 2,153 at the 2020 census.

== History ==
A post office at the home of S.J. Blythe occupied the area known as Blythe, Texas. In 1917, the Santa Fe Railroad moved into the vicinity, but the rail company ran into a problem. Santa Fe already had one town by that name located in Blythe, California. The company decided to change the name of this new location to honor Charles L. Seagraves, an employee who worked as a traveling agent and was favored by local residents. The Spearman Land Company building was the first to be erected, and the Higginbotham Bartlett Lumber Company followed shortly thereafter. Seagraves grew rapidly as a town, and in 1928, suffered a fire that burned a major portion of the business section. The only building left standing on the west side of Main Street was the Seagraves Motor Company, which led to the rebuilding of modern brick buildings, many of which remain today.

== Geography ==
Seagraves is located at 32°57′N 102°34′W.

According to the United States Census Bureau, the city has a total area of 1.5 square miles (3.9 km^{2}), all land.

== Demographics ==
Historical population
Census	Pop.	Note	%±
1930	505		—
1940	3,225		538.6%
1950	2,101		−34.9%
1960	2,307		9.8%
1970	2,440		5.8%
1980	2,596		6.4%
1990	2,398		−7.6%
2000	2,334		−2.7%
2010	2,417		3.6%
2020	2,153		−10.9%
U.S. Decennial Census

=== 2020 census ===
As of the 2020 census, Seagraves had a population of 2,153, and the median age was 35.7 years; 27.9% of the residents were under 18 and 15.3% were 65 or older. For every 100 females, there were 94.8 males, and for every 100 females 18 and over, there were 92.6 males 18 and over.

None of the residents lived in urban areas, while 100.0% lived in rural areas.

Of the 772 households in Seagraves, 39.0% had children under 18 living in them, 46.9% were married-couple households, 18.9% were households with a male householder and no spouse or partner present, and 28.5% were households with a female householder and no spouse or partner present. About 24.4% of all households were made up of individuals, and 12.3% had someone living alone who was 65 or older.

The city had 945 housing units, of which 18.3% were vacant. The homeowner vacancy rate was 2.2%, and the rental vacancy rate was 17.6%.

Racial composition as of the 2020 census
Race	Number	Percentage
White	847	39.3%
Black or African American	118	5.5%
American Indian and Alaska Native	7	0.3%
Asian	1	0.0%
Native Hawaiian and other Pacific Islander	0	0.0%
Some other race	273	12.7%
Two or more races	907	42.1%
Hispanic or Latino (of any race)	1,586	73.7%

=== 2000 census ===
As of the census of 2000, 2,334 people, 812 households, and 616 families resided in the city. The population density was 1,609.8 inhabitants per square mile (621.5/km^{2}). The 977 housing units had an average density of 673.9 per square mile (260.2/km^{2}). The racial makeup of the city was 66.80% White, 6.08% African American, 0.73% Native American, 0.04% Asian, 23.31% from other races, and 3.04% from two or more races. Hispanics or Latinos of any race were 55.91% of the population.

Of 812 households, 39.4% had children under 18 living with them, 60.7% were married couples living together, 10.6% had a female householder with no husband present, and 24.1% were not families. About 22.5% of all households were made up of individuals, and 11.8% had someone living alone who was 65 or older. The average household size was 2.87, and the average family size was 3.40.

In the city, the population was distributed as 32.8% under 18, 8.7% from 18 to 24, 25.4% from 25 to 44, 20.2% from 45 to 64, and 12.9% who were 65 or older. The median age was 32 years. For every 100 females, there were 95.3 males. For every 100 females age 18 and over, there were 93.0 males.

The median income in the city for a household was $26,929 and for a family was $30,707. Males had a median income of $27,944 versus $16,181 for females. The per capita income for the city was $12,253. About 22.3% of families and 25.6% of the population were below the poverty line, including 31.8% of those under 18 and 22.0% of those 65 or over.

== Education ==
The City of Seagraves is served by the Seagraves Independent School District and home to the Seagraves High School Eagles.
