= KPHS =

Plains, Texas; United States
- Frequency: 90.3 MHz

Programming
- Format: Defunct (was High school radio)

Ownership
- Owner: Plains Independent School District

Technical information
- Facility ID: 52774
- Class: A
- ERP: 220 watts
- HAAT: 41 meters (135 ft)
- Transmitter coordinates: 33°11′16″N 102°49′20″W

KPHS (90.3 FM) was a high school radio station at Plains High School in Plains, Texas. The station was owned by Plains Independent School District. Its license was not renewed and expired on August 1, 2021.
