= Plains High School =

Location
- 905 10th Street; Plains, Texas 79355; United States; 33.188714°N 102.825335°W

Information
- School type: Public high school
- School district: Plains Independent School District
- Principal: Jorge Mendez
- Teaching staff: 18.52 (FTE)
- Grades: 9–12
- Enrollment: 134 (2023–2024)
- Student to teacher ratio: 7.24
- Colors: Black & Gold
- Athletics conference: UIL Class 2A
- Mascot: Cowboy/Cowgirl
- Website: Plains High School website

Plains High School is a public high school located in the city of Plains, Texas, and classified as a 2A school by the University Interscholastic League. It is part of the Plains Independent School District located in north-central Yoakum County. In 2013, the school was rated "met standard" by the Texas Education Agency. A new school complex to house the elementary, middle, and high schools was completed and opened in fall of 2013.

== Athletics ==
Plains High School participates in these sports:

- Baseball
- Basketball
- Cross-country running
- Football
- Golf
- Powerlifting
- Softball
- Track and field
- Volleyball

=== State titles ===
- Girls Basketball
  - 2014 (1A/D1)
- Boys Cross Country
  - 1993 (1A), 2004 (1A), 2009 (1A), 2022 (2A), 2023 (2A), 2024 (2A)
- Volleyball
  - 1967 (1A), 1968 (1A), 1969 (1A), 1970 (1A), 1971 (1A), 1985 (2A), 1988 (1A), 1989 (1A), 1990 (1A)

== Band ==
- UIL Marching Band state champions
  - 1991 (1A), 1995 (1A)

== Theater ==
- One Act Play
  - 2011 (1A), 2012 (1A)
