= 1968 United States presidential election in Texas =

- November 5, 1968
- Turnout: ▲75.62% (of registered voters); 48.70% (of voting age population)

Nominee	Hubert Humphrey	Richard Nixon	George Wallace
Party	Democratic	Republican	American Independent
Home state	Minnesota	New York (Note: Although he was born in California and he served as a U.S. senator from California, in 1968 Richard Nixon's official state of residence was New York, because he moved there to practice law after his defeat in the 1962 California gubernatorial election. During his first term as president, Nixon re-established his residency in California. Consequently, most reliable reference books list Nixon's home state as New York in the 1968 election and his home state as California in the 1972 (and 1960) election.)	Alabama
Running mate	Edmund Muskie	Spiro Agnew	Curtis LeMay
Electoral vote	25	0	0
Popular vote	1,266,804	1,227,844	584,269
Percentage	41.14%	39.87%	18.97%

Humphrey
30–40%
40–50%
50–60%
60–70%
70–80%
80–90%
90–100%
Nixon
30–40%
40–50%
50–60%
60–70%
70–80%
80–90%
Wallace
30–40%
40–50%
50–60%
60–70%
Humphrey/Nixon Tie
30–40%
40–50%
Humphrey/Wallace Tie
30–40%
40–50%
No Vote
President before election
Lyndon B. Johnson
Democratic
Elected President
Richard Nixon
Republican

The 1968 United States presidential election in Texas was held on November 5, 1968. All 50 states and the District of Columbia, were part of the 1968 United States presidential election. The state chose 25 electors to represent them in the Electoral College, who voted for president and vice president.

The Democratic Party candidate, incumbent Vice President Hubert Humphrey, very narrowly carried Texas with 41.14% of the vote, giving him the state's 25 electoral votes. However, he narrowly lost the general election to Republican candidate, former Vice President Richard Nixon. This was the first occasion when Texas had not backed the winning presidential candidate since voting for John W. Davis in 1924, and the last such occasion until 1992. This is also the most recent presidential election in which Texas would back a losing Democratic candidate, and the penultimate time it voted Democratic.

When Texas "favorite son" Lyndon B. Johnson withdrew from the 1968 election in March, it was generally thought that the Republican Party would have a good chance of winning Texas despite losing by 27 points in 1964 and the presence of former Alabama Governor George Wallace running as a candidate for the American Independent Party, a far-right political party. Wallace was known for his pro-segregationist politics, which would win him five southern states in the general election. However, in Humphrey's favor was the abolition of the poll tax via the Twenty-Fourth Amendment that permitted previously disfranchised Mexican-Americans to register and vote for the first time. The Mexican-American South Texas counties of Duval, Webb and Jim Hogg had been among the four most Democratic in the nation in 1964, and despite polling fewer than eighteen thousand out of a state total exceeding three million votes, those three counties would provide over thirty percent of Humphrey's margin and Duval was again the most Democratic county in the nation.

On September 21, a poll by Joe Belden gave Nixon and Humphrey each thirty percent of the vote and Wallace twenty-five percent. In the period between Belden's poll and the election, Wallace lost considerable support largely to Humphrey, owing chiefly to Democrat Preston Smith's "resolutely law-and-order" campaign for the governorship. This, along with strong loyalty of Texas Democrats much more conservative than the liberal Humphrey, was sufficient to allow the Democrats to carry the state. Exit polls suggest Humphrey gained a third of the non-Hispanic white vote in Texas, vis-à-vis around 25 percent in Virginia and less than 20% in all other southern states.

Wallace, who had been rivaling the two major party nominees in early polls, came in a distant third, with 18.97 percent of the vote, his lowest in any former Confederate state. Wallace did win 21 of Texas' 254 counties, which was enough for him to also carry one congressional district. Wallace's base of support was primarily in rural East Texas, which is more culturally tied to the Deep South than the rest of the state, although he did carry four counties in the West Texas region, with sparsely populated Loving County being the westernmost county in the country to vote for Wallace.

Among white voters, 45% supported Nixon, 34% supported Humphrey, and 22% supported Wallace.

== Results ==
1968 United States presidential election in Texas
Party	Candidate	Votes	Percentage	Electoral votes
Democrat	Hubert Humphrey	1,266,804	41.14%	25
Republican	Richard Nixon	1,227,844	39.87%	0
American Independent	George Wallace	584,269	18.97%	0
Write-ins		489	0.02%	0
Totals		3,079,406	100.00%	25
Voter turnout (voting age/registered voters)				48.7%/75.6%

=== Results by county ===
County	Hubert Humphrey Democratic		Richard Nixon Republican		George Wallace American Independent		Various candidates Write-ins (Note: An additional 190 write-in votes were not tabulated by county)		Margin		Total votes cast
County	#	%	#	%	#	%	#	%	#	%	Total votes cast
Anderson	3,447	36.40%	2,828	29.86%	3,196	33.75%			251 (Note: In this county where Nixon ran third behind both Humphrey and Wallace, margin given is Humphrey vote minus Wallace vote and percentage margin Humphrey percentage minus Wallace percentage.)	2.65%	9,471
Andrews	922	25.37%	1,400	38.53%	1,312	36.10%			88 (Note: In this county where Humphrey ran third behind both Nixon and Wallace, margin given is Nixon vote minus Wallace vote and percentage margin Nixon percentage minus Wallace percentage.)	2.43%	3,634
Angelina	5,174	32.48%	4,645	29.16%	6,111	38.36%			−937	−5.88%	15,930
Aransas	1,222	45.01%	1,076	39.63%	417	15.36%			146	5.38%	2,715
Archer	1,308	55.49%	636	26.98%	413	17.52%			672	28.51%	2,357
Armstrong	301	31.99%	434	46.12%	206	21.89%			−133	−14.13%	941
Atascosa	2,522	49.47%	1,805	35.41%	771	15.12%			717	14.06%	5,098
Austin	1,299	29.83%	1,971	45.27%	1,084	24.90%			−672	−15.44%	4,354
Bailey	820	32.06%	1,174	45.90%	563	22.01%	1	0.04%	−354	−13.84%	2,558
Bandera	535	29.72%	842	46.78%	423	23.50%			−307	−17.06%	1,800
Bastrop	2,687	52.51%	1,455	28.43%	975	19.05%			1,232	24.08%	5,117
Baylor	1,064	49.17%	657	30.36%	443	20.47%			407	18.81%	2,164
Bee	2,957	53.34%	1,995	35.98%	589	10.62%	3	0.05%	962	17.36%	5,544
Bell	11,893	56.24%	5,705	26.98%	3,547	16.77%			6,188	29.26%	21,145
Bexar	95,325	51.56%	72,951	39.46%	16,598	8.98%			22,374	12.10%	184,874
Blanco	620	42.55%	614	42.14%	223	15.31%			6	0.41%	1,457
Borden	157	40.67%	117	30.31%	112	29.02%			40	10.36%	386
Bosque	1,817	46.34%	1,377	35.12%	727	18.54%			440	11.22%	3,921
Bowie	6,468	33.00%	5,966	30.44%	7,165	36.56%			−697	−3.56%	19,599
Brazoria	11,439	38.00%	10,631	35.32%	8,026	26.66%	7	0.02%	808	2.68%	30,103
Brazos	6,299	40.43%	6,839	43.90%	2,437	15.64%	4	0.03%	−540	−3.47%	15,579
Brewster	958	45.82%	790	37.78%	342	16.36%	1	0.05%	168	8.04%	2,091
Briscoe	528	45.60%	411	35.49%	219	18.91%			117	10.11%	1,158
Brooks	1,904	73.12%	534	20.51%	166	6.37%			1,370	52.61%	2,604
Brown	3,999	46.49%	2,997	34.84%	1,606	18.67%			1,002	11.65%	8,602
Burleson	1,678	51.43%	891	27.31%	694	21.27%			787	24.12%	3,263
Burnet	1,876	47.16%	1,459	36.68%	643	16.16%			417	10.48%	3,978
Caldwell	2,889	56.32%	1,402	27.33%	837	16.32%	2	0.04%	1,487	28.99%	5,130
Calhoun	2,612	48.82%	1,672	31.25%	1,065	19.91%	1	0.02%	940	17.57%	5,350
Callahan	1,437	46.41%	921	29.75%	737	23.80%	1	0.03%	516	16.66%	3,096
Cameron	15,726	53.26%	11,759	39.82%	2,042	6.92%			3,967	13.44%	29,527
Camp	1,272	43.85%	555	19.13%	1,074	37.02%			198	6.83%	2,901
Carson	904	33.67%	1,211	45.10%	570	21.23%			−307	−11.43%	2,685
Cass	2,536	34.50%	1,930	26.26%	2,883	39.22%	1	0.01%	−347	−4.72%	7,350
Castro	1,181	41.61%	1,033	36.40%	623	21.95%	1	0.04%	148	5.21%	2,838
Chambers	1,217	33.74%	1,061	29.42%	1,329	36.85%			−112	−3.11%	3,607
Cherokee	3,242	33.74%	2,575	26.80%	3,791	39.46%			−549	−5.72%	9,608
Childress	1,093	39.62%	1,045	37.88%	621	22.51%			48	1.74%	2,759
Clay	1,573	49.56%	936	29.49%	665	20.95%			637	20.07%	3,174
Cochran	633	38.83%	548	33.62%	449	27.55%			85	5.21%	1,630
Coke	563	48.58%	387	33.39%	208	17.95%	1	0.09%	176	15.19%	1,159
Coleman	1,449	35.26%	1,507	36.68%	1,153	28.06%			−58	−1.42%	4,109
Collin	5,918	36.39%	6,494	39.93%	3,850	23.67%			−576	−3.54%	16,262
Collingsworth	746	38.59%	712	36.83%	475	24.57%			34	1.76%	1,933
Colorado	1,976	36.34%	2,296	42.22%	1,163	21.39%	3	0.06%	−320	−5.88%	5,438
Comal	2,338	34.84%	3,646	54.34%	724	10.79%	2	0.03%	−1,308	−19.50%	6,710
Comanche	1,980	48.00%	1,436	34.81%	708	17.16%	1	0.02%	544	13.19%	4,125
Concho	502	45.23%	411	37.03%	197	17.75%			91	8.20%	1,110
Cooke	2,711	34.22%	3,799	47.96%	1,412	17.82%			−1,088	−13.74%	7,922
Coryell	2,987	51.00%	1,698	28.99%	1,172	20.01%			1,289	22.01%	5,857
Cottle	742	58.15%	268	21.00%	266	20.85%			474	37.15%	1,276
Crane	498	29.24%	493	28.95%	712	41.81%			−214	−12.57%	1,703
Crockett	571	42.02%	509	37.45%	279	20.53%			62	4.57%	1,359
Crosby	1,574	55.42%	865	30.46%	401	14.12%			709	24.96%	2,840
Culberson	330	42.69%	298	38.55%	145	18.76%			32	4.14%	773
Dallam	588	29.28%	990	49.30%	430	21.41%			−402	−20.02%	2,008
Dallas	123,809	34.06%	184,193	50.66%	55,552	15.28%			−60,384	−16.60%	363,554
Dawson	1,522	33.72%	2,091	46.33%	900	19.94%			−569	−12.61%	4,513
Deaf Smith	1,545	32.78%	2,474	52.49%	691	14.66%	3	0.06%	−929	−19.71%	4,713
Delta	1,037	55.10%	370	19.66%	475	25.24%			562	29.86%	1,882
Denton	7,463	39.56%	8,222	43.59%	3,178	16.85%			−759	−4.03%	18,863
DeWitt	1,871	35.68%	2,589	49.37%	784	14.95%			−718	−13.69%	5,244
Dickens	811	52.87%	428	27.90%	295	19.23%			383	24.97%	1,534
Dimmit	896	53.98%	584	35.18%	177	10.66%	3	0.18%	312	18.80%	1,660
Donley	543	33.37%	816	50.15%	268	16.47%			−273	−16.78%	1,627
Duval	3,978	88.74%	384	8.57%	121	2.70%			3,594	80.17%	4,483
Eastland	2,884	45.42%	2,453	38.63%	1,013	15.95%			431	6.79%	6,350
Ector	5,312	21.65%	10,557	43.02%	8,671	35.33%			1,886	−7.69%	24,540
Edwards	148	23.16%	409	64.01%	82	12.83%			−261	−40.85%	639
Ellis	5,431	45.01%	3,794	31.44%	2,838	23.52%	4	0.03%	1,637	13.57%	12,067
El Paso	32,658	47.94%	30,347	44.55%	5,111	7.50%			2,311	3.39%	68,116
Erath	2,915	48.11%	2,209	36.46%	935	15.43%			706	11.65%	6,059
Falls	2,990	52.47%	1,345	23.60%	1,364	23.93%			1,626	28.54%	5,699
Fannin	3,931	54.77%	1,585	22.08%	1,661	23.14%			2,270	31.63%	7,177
Fayette	1,833	31.74%	2,380	41.21%	1,562	27.05%			−547	−9.47%	5,775
Fisher	1,560	65.41%	555	23.27%	268	11.24%	2	0.08%	1,005	42.14%	2,385
Floyd	1,305	36.08%	1,465	40.50%	847	23.42%			−160	−4.42%	3,617
Foard	594	60.74%	216	22.09%	168	17.18%			378	38.65%	978
Fort Bend	4,493	39.02%	4,573	39.72%	2,447	21.25%	1	0.01%	−80	−0.70%	11,514
Franklin	1,001	50.33%	481	24.18%	507	25.49%			494	24.84%	1,989
Freestone	2,066	50.48%	958	23.41%	1,069	26.12%			997	24.36%	4,093
Frio	1,330	54.69%	795	32.69%	307	12.62%			535	22.00%	2,432
Gaines	1,087	30.78%	1,401	39.68%	1,037	29.37%	6	0.17%	−314	−8.90%	3,531
Galveston	26,041	49.52%	16,229	30.86%	10,322	19.63%			9,812	18.66%	52,592
Garza	662	39.88%	615	37.05%	383	23.07%			47	2.83%	1,660
Gillespie	725	17.66%	2,945	71.74%	432	10.52%	3	0.07%	−2,220	−54.08%	4,105
Glasscock	106	23.71%	169	37.81%	172	38.48%			−3	−0.67%	447
Goliad	690	44.43%	707	45.52%	156	10.05%			−17	−1.09%	1,553
Gonzales	1,930	43.97%	1,476	33.63%	983	22.40%			454	10.34%	4,389
Gray	2,374	21.99%	5,994	55.53%	2,427	22.48%			3,567	−33.05%	10,795
Grayson	10,379	45.12%	8,007	34.81%	4,615	20.06%			2,372	10.31%	23,001
Gregg	5,733	24.80%	9,278	40.13%	8,109	35.07%			1,169	5.06%	23,120
Grimes	1,473	41.79%	1,076	30.52%	976	27.69%			397	11.27%	3,525
Guadalupe	3,529	38.77%	4,332	47.59%	1,241	13.63%			−803	−8.82%	9,102
Hale	3,293	31.98%	4,696	45.60%	2,309	22.42%			−1,403	−13.62%	10,298
Hall	1,038	46.65%	753	33.84%	434	19.51%			285	12.81%	2,225
Hamilton	1,116	39.38%	1,266	44.67%	452	15.95%			−150	−5.29%	2,834
Hansford	392	17.92%	1,359	62.11%	437	19.97%			922	−42.14%	2,188
Hardeman	1,145	44.92%	873	34.25%	531	20.83%			272	10.67%	2,549
Hardin	2,894	32.66%	1,986	22.41%	3,979	44.90%	3	0.03%	−1,085	−12.24%	8,862
Harris	182,546	38.75%	202,079	42.90%	86,412	18.35%			−19,533	−4.15%	471,037
Harrison	4,959	35.55%	3,668	26.29%	5,324	38.16%			−365	−2.61%	13,951
Hartley	299	25.78%	597	51.47%	264	22.76%			−298	−25.69%	1,160
Haskell	1,888	58.80%	713	22.20%	610	19.00%			1,175	36.60%	3,211
Hays	3,546	57.35%	1,993	32.23%	643	10.40%	1	0.02%	1,553	25.12%	6,183
Hemphill	400	30.77%	699	53.77%	201	15.46%			−299	−23.00%	1,300
Henderson	3,119	39.32%	2,315	29.19%	2,497	31.48%	1	0.01%	622	7.84%	7,932
Hidalgo	20,087	54.13%	14,455	38.95%	2,569	6.92%			5,632	15.18%	37,111
Hill	3,415	48.95%	1,809	25.93%	1,751	25.10%	2	0.03%	1,606	23.02%	6,977
Hockley	2,426	39.47%	2,265	36.85%	1,456	23.69%			161	2.62%	6,147
Hood	1,155	53.45%	593	27.44%	411	19.02%	2	0.09%	562	26.01%	2,161
Hopkins	2,700	41.59%	1,860	28.65%	1,932	29.76%			768	11.83%	6,492
Houston	2,782	44.60%	1,391	22.30%	2,062	33.06%	2	0.03%	720	11.54%	6,237
Howard	3,897	37.11%	3,812	36.30%	2,789	26.56%	3	0.03%	85	0.81%	10,501
Hudspeth	289	40.88%	285	40.31%	132	18.67%	1	0.14%	4	0.57%	707
Hunt	4,785	37.08%	4,651	36.04%	3,469	26.88%			134	1.04%	12,905
Hutchinson	2,416	23.81%	4,813	47.43%	2,919	28.76%			1,894	−18.67%	10,148
Irion	187	38.16%	211	43.06%	92	18.78%			−24	−4.90%	490
Jack	1,133	43.39%	966	37.00%	512	19.61%			167	6.39%	2,611
Jackson	1,698	39.62%	1,438	33.55%	1,145	26.71%	5	0.12%	260	6.07%	4,286
Jasper	2,438	33.94%	1,839	25.60%	2,906	40.46%			−468	−6.52%	7,183
Jeff Davis	239	48.19%	191	38.51%	66	13.31%			48	9.68%	496
Jefferson	30,032	38.57%	26,007	33.40%	21,824	28.03%	5	0.01%	4,025	5.17%	77,868
Jim Hogg	1,276	82.06%	223	14.34%	53	3.41%	3	0.19%	1,053	67.72%	1,555
Jim Wells	6,304	62.73%	2,827	28.13%	913	9.08%	6	0.06%	3,477	34.60%	10,050
Johnson	5,330	42.95%	4,372	35.23%	2,709	21.83%			958	7.72%	12,411
Jones	2,372	47.64%	1,676	33.66%	931	18.70%			696	13.98%	4,979
Karnes	2,271	52.83%	1,342	31.22%	686	15.96%			929	21.61%	4,299
Kaufman	3,311	40.92%	2,431	30.04%	2,350	29.04%			880	10.88%	8,092
Kendall	538	21.77%	1,569	63.50%	364	14.73%			−1,031	−41.73%	2,471
Kenedy	100	54.64%	76	41.53%	7	3.83%			24	13.11%	183
Kent	303	47.79%	143	22.56%	188	29.65%			115	18.14%	634
Kerr	1,878	28.27%	3,692	55.58%	1,073	16.15%			−1,814	−27.31%	6,643
Kimble	463	33.85%	640	46.78%	264	19.30%	1	0.07%	−177	−12.93%	1,368
King	109	48.66%	44	19.64%	71	31.70%			38	16.96%	224
Kinney	333	55.59%	198	33.06%	68	11.35%			135	22.53%	599
Kleberg	4,633	57.80%	2,713	33.84%	670	8.36%			1,920	23.96%	8,016
Knox	1,222	57.45%	580	27.27%	325	15.28%			642	30.18%	2,127
Lamar	4,635	42.39%	3,395	31.05%	2,903	26.55%			1,240	11.34%	10,933
Lamb	2,267	35.86%	2,595	41.05%	1,460	23.09%			−328	−5.19%	6,322
Lampasas	1,423	50.50%	935	33.18%	460	16.32%			488	17.32%	2,818
La Salle	645	59.67%	324	29.97%	112	10.36%			321	29.70%	1,081
Lavaca	2,165	40.74%	1,698	31.95%	1,451	27.31%			467	8.79%	5,314
Lee	1,283	42.92%	1,075	35.97%	631	21.11%			208	6.95%	2,989
Leon	1,536	49.95%	659	21.43%	880	28.62%			656	21.33%	3,075
Liberty	3,469	36.11%	2,746	28.58%	3,393	35.31%			76	0.80%	9,608
Limestone	2,796	49.20%	1,485	26.13%	1,402	24.67%			1,311	23.07%	5,683
Lipscomb	279	18.06%	1,079	69.84%	187	12.10%			−800	−51.78%	1,545
Live Oak	922	39.33%	938	40.02%	484	20.65%			−16	−0.69%	2,344
Llano	1,282	45.38%	1,079	38.19%	464	16.42%			203	7.19%	2,825
Loving	18	22.22%	23	28.40%	40	49.38%			−17	−20.98%	81
Lubbock	15,430	30.77%	25,646	51.13%	9,078	18.10%			−10,216	−20.36%	50,154
Lynn	1,333	46.25%	1,005	34.87%	544	18.88%			328	11.38%	2,882
Madison	994	41.99%	608	25.69%	765	32.32%			229	9.67%	2,367
Marion	1,260	44.15%	637	22.32%	957	33.53%			303	10.62%	2,854
Martin	373	29.72%	343	27.33%	539	42.95%			−166	−13.23%	1,255
Mason	560	36.89%	789	51.98%	169	11.13%			-229	-15.09%	1,518
Matagorda	3,595	42.46%	3,094	36.55%	1,777	20.99%			501	5.91%	8,466
Maverick	1,570	62.65%	771	30.77%	165	6.58%			799	31.88%	2,506
McCulloch	1,353	50.88%	947	35.61%	359	13.50%			406	15.27%	2,659
McLennan	22,388	48.00%	15,958	34.22%	8,268	17.73%	25	0.05%	6,430	13.78%	46,639
McMullen	160	37.38%	169	39.49%	99	23.13%			−9	−2.11%	428
Medina	2,471	47.06%	2,058	39.19%	722	13.75%			413	7.87%	5,251
Menard	362	37.28%	491	50.57%	118	12.15%			−129	−13.29%	971
Midland	4,756	20.48%	12,789	55.07%	5,675	24.44%	2	0.01%	7,114	−30.63%	23,222
Milam	3,269	51.01%	1,614	25.18%	1,525	23.79%	1	0.02%	1,655	25.83%	6,409
Mills	722	43.42%	645	38.79%	296	17.80%			77	4.63%	1,663
Mitchell	1,589	53.30%	893	29.96%	499	16.74%			696	23.34%	2,981
Montague	2,555	49.09%	1,736	33.35%	914	17.56%			819	15.74%	5,205
Montgomery	4,021	30.34%	4,353	32.84%	4,879	36.81%	2	0.02%	−526	−3.97%	13,255
Moore	1,359	27.20%	2,378	47.60%	1,258	25.18%	1	0.02%	−1,019	−20.40%	4,996
Morris	1,701	41.61%	1,064	26.03%	1,323	32.36%			378	9.25%	4,088
Motley	397	35.86%	415	37.49%	295	26.65%			−18	−1.63%	1,107
Nacogdoches	3,449	34.91%	3,235	32.74%	3,196	32.35%			214	2.17%	9,880
Navarro	5,296	50.98%	2,845	27.39%	2,245	21.61%	2	0.02%	2,451	23.59%	10,388
Newton	1,476	41.68%	555	15.67%	1,509	42.62%	1	0.03%	−33	−0.94%	3,541
Nolan	2,784	46.88%	1,969	33.16%	1,185	19.96%			815	13.72%	5,938
Nueces	39,025	57.82%	21,307	31.57%	7,159	10.61%			17,718	26.25%	67,491
Ochiltree	432	13.79%	2,208	70.50%	492	15.71%			1,716	−54.79%	3,132
Oldham	237	30.08%	320	40.61%	230	29.19%	1	0.13%	−83	−10.53%	788
Orange	6,485	30.57%	5,886	27.74%	8,845	41.69%			−2,360	−11.12%	21,216
Palo Pinto	3,552	47.77%	2,627	35.33%	1,257	16.90%			925	12.44%	7,436
Panola	1,711	28.77%	1,586	26.67%	2,650	44.56%			−939	−15.79%	5,947
Parker	4,301	46.23%	3,068	32.98%	1,934	20.79%			1,233	13.25%	9,303
Parmer	833	26.85%	1,539	49.61%	730	23.53%			−706	−22.76%	3,102
Pecos	1,592	39.61%	1,524	37.92%	900	22.39%	3	0.07%	68	1.69%	4,019
Polk	1,841	40.31%	1,013	22.18%	1,712	37.49%	1	0.02%	129	2.82%	4,567
Potter	8,238	30.43%	13,338	49.27%	5,486	20.26%	10	0.04%	−5,100	−18.84%	27,072
Presidio	969	61.25%	481	30.40%	132	8.34%			488	30.85%	1,582
Rains	558	46.35%	340	28.24%	306	25.42%			218	18.11%	1,204
Randall	4,060	21.84%	11,400	61.32%	3,128	16.82%	4	0.02%	−7,340	−39.48%	18,592
Reagan	370	33.27%	454	40.83%	288	25.90%			−84	−7.56%	1,112
Real	277	39.40%	290	41.25%	136	19.35%			−13	−1.85%	703
Red River	2,245	43.99%	1,305	25.57%	1,554	30.45%			691	13.54%	5,104
Reeves	1,456	41.49%	1,310	37.33%	743	21.17%			146	4.16%	3,509
Refugio	1,699	51.50%	1,114	33.77%	486	14.73%			585	17.73%	3,299
Roberts	90	17.51%	311	60.51%	113	21.98%			198	−38.53%	514
Robertson	2,833	59.74%	965	20.35%	944	19.91%			1,868	39.39%	4,742
Rockwall	778	39.39%	614	31.09%	582	29.47%	1	0.05%	164	8.30%	1,975
Runnels	1,448	37.88%	1,707	44.65%	668	17.47%			−259	−6.77%	3,823
Rusk	4,078	32.50%	3,739	29.80%	4,729	37.69%			−651	−5.19%	12,546
Sabine	1,078	43.68%	455	18.44%	935	37.88%			143	5.80%	2,468
San Augustine	817	33.21%	506	20.57%	1,137	46.22%			−320	−13.01%	2,460
San Jacinto	1,235	53.49%	381	16.50%	693	30.01%			542	23.48%	2,309
San Patricio	6,818	54.94%	3,717	29.95%	1,876	15.12%			3,101	24.99%	12,411
San Saba	1,140	53.27%	535	25.00%	465	21.73%			605	28.27%	2,140
Schleicher	378	39.71%	396	41.60%	178	18.70%			−18	−1.89%	952
Scurry	2,031	41.78%	1,745	35.90%	1,084	22.30%	1	0.02%	286	5.88%	4,861
Shackelford	673	44.66%	557	36.96%	277	18.38%			116	7.70%	1,507
Shelby	2,511	36.27%	1,127	16.28%	3,285	47.45%			−774	−11.18%	6,923
Sherman	297	21.28%	723	51.79%	376	26.93%			347	−24.86%	1,396
Smith	8,897	29.10%	12,079	39.51%	9,595	31.39%			2,484	−8.12%	30,571
Somervell	384	42.62%	313	34.74%	204	22.64%			71	7.88%	901
Starr	3,922	73.08%	1,374	25.60%	71	1.32%			2,548	47.48%	5,367
Stephens	1,239	40.61%	1,287	42.18%	525	17.21%			−48	−1.57%	3,051
Sterling	151	40.27%	170	45.33%	54	14.40%			−19	−5.06%	375
Stonewall	635	57.21%	213	19.19%	262	23.60%			373	33.61%	1,110
Sutton	351	38.57%	412	45.27%	147	16.15%			−61	−6.70%	910
Swisher	1,760	49.44%	1,177	33.06%	623	17.50%			583	16.38%	3,560
Tarrant	79,705	41.79%	81,786	42.88%	29,256	15.34%			−2,081	−1.09%	190,747
Taylor	9,107	35.54%	12,218	47.68%	4,289	16.74%	12	0.05%	−3,111	−12.14%	25,626
Terrell	201	33.44%	250	41.60%	149	24.79%	1	0.17%	−49	−8.16%	601
Terry	1,625	36.71%	1,948	44.00%	854	19.29%			−323	−7.29%	4,427
Throckmorton	618	58.25%	317	29.88%	126	11.88%			301	28.37%	1,061
Titus	2,317	40.12%	1,572	27.22%	1,886	32.66%			431	7.46%	5,775
Tom Green	6,774	34.67%	9,682	49.56%	3,074	15.74%	6	0.03%	−2,908	−14.89%	19,536
Travis	39,667	48.07%	34,309	41.58%	8,424	10.21%	120	0.15%	5,358	6.49%	82,520
Trinity	1,146	41.24%	636	22.89%	997	35.88%			149	5.36%	2,779
Tyler	1,204	31.80%	1,120	29.58%	1,462	38.62%			−258	−6.82%	3,786
Upshur	2,480	36.02%	1,519	22.06%	2,886	41.92%			−406	−5.90%	6,885
Upton	463	29.19%	664	41.87%	459	28.94%			−201	−12.68%	1,586
Uvalde	1,736	36.48%	2,252	47.32%	768	16.14%	3	0.06%	−516	−10.84%	4,759
Val Verde	3,205	56.25%	1,914	33.59%	573	10.06%	6	0.11%	1,291	22.66%	5,698
Van Zandt	2,706	40.08%	1,954	28.94%	2,091	30.97%			615	9.11%	6,751
Victoria	6,042	41.02%	6,352	43.12%	2,336	15.86%			−310	−2.10%	14,730
Walker	2,391	41.30%	1,946	33.62%	1,452	25.08%			445	7.68%	5,789
Waller	1,684	48.97%	958	27.86%	797	23.18%			726	21.11%	3,439
Ward	1,331	31.21%	1,552	36.39%	1,382	32.40%			170	3.99%	4,265
Washington	1,686	30.07%	3,244	57.86%	677	12.07%			−1,558	−27.79%	5,607
Webb	9,419	79.65%	2,103	17.78%	304	2.57%			7,316	61.87%	11,826
Wharton	4,304	43.22%	3,773	37.89%	1,882	18.90%			531	5.33%	9,959
Wheeler	812	31.74%	1,176	45.97%	570	22.28%			−364	−14.23%	2,558
Wichita	15,387	46.05%	11,937	35.72%	6,087	18.22%	3	0.01%	3,450	10.33%	33,414
Wilbarger	1,996	38.40%	1,909	36.73%	1,292	24.86%	1	0.02%	87	1.67%	5,198
Willacy	1,930	53.05%	1,243	34.17%	465	12.78%			687	18.88%	3,638
Williamson	5,528	54.61%	2,923	28.87%	1,669	16.49%	3	0.03%	2,605	25.74%	10,123
Wilson	2,336	55.63%	1,321	31.46%	542	12.91%			1,015	24.17%	4,199
Winkler	938	26.21%	1,391	38.87%	1,249	34.90%	1	0.03%	142	3.97%	3,579
Wise	2,774	47.31%	1,983	33.82%	1,107	18.88%			791	13.49%	5,864
Wood	2,192	35.02%	2,046	32.69%	2,020	32.27%	1	0.02%	146	2.33%	6,259
Yoakum	615	24.98%	1,123	45.61%	724	29.41%			399	−16.20%	2,462
Young	2,482	46.43%	1,860	34.79%	1,004	18.78%			622	11.64%	5,346
Zapata	909	75.00%	251	20.71%	52	4.29%			658	54.29%	1,212
Zavala	1,307	59.01%	693	31.29%	214	9.66%	1	0.05%	614	27.72%	2,215
Totals	1,266,804	41.14%	1,227,844	39.87%	584,269	18.97%	489	0.02%	38,960	1.27%	3,079,406

==== Counties that flipped from Democratic to American Independent ====
- Angelina
- Bowie
- Cass
- Chambers
- Cherokee
- Crane
- Hardin
- Harrison
- Jasper
- Loving
- Martin
- Montgomery
- Newton
- Orange
- Rusk
- San Augustine
- Shelby
- Tyler
- Upshur

==== Counties that flipped from Republican to American Independent ====
- Glasscock
- Panola

==== Counties that flipped from Democratic to Republican ====
- Andrews
- Armstrong
- Austin
- Bailey
- Bandera
- Brazos
- Carson
- Coleman
- Collin
- Colorado
- Comal
- Cooke
- Dallam
- Dallas
- Dawson
- Denton
- Deaf Smith
- DeWitt
- Donley
- Fayette
- Floyd
- Fort Bend
- Gaines
- Gillespie
- Goliad
- Guadalupe
- Hale
- Hamilton
- Harris
- Hartley
- Hemphill
- Irion
- Kerr
- Kimble
- Lamb
- Live Oak
- Lubbock
- Mason
- McMullen
- Menard
- Moore
- Motley
- Oldham
- Parmer
- Potter
- Reagan
- Real
- Runnels
- Schleicher
- Stephens
- Sterling
- Sutton
- Tarrant
- Taylor
- Terrell
- Terry
- Tom Green
- Upton
- Uvalde
- Victoria
- Ward
- Washington
- Wheeler
- Winkler
- Yoakum

=== Results by congressional district ===
Humphrey won 13 out of the 23 congressional districts in Texas, Nixon won 9, including six held by Democrats, and Wallace won 1, which was held by a Democrat.

District	Humphrey	Nixon	Wallace	Representative
1st	36.9%	27.0%	36.1%	Wright Patman
2nd	35.3%	27.6%	37.1%	John Dowdy
3rd	33.3%	51.2%	15.5%	James M. Collins
4th	35.6%	36.4%	28.0%	Ray Roberts
5th	35.6%	46.0%	15.0%	Earle Cabell
6th	38.8%	38.7%	22.5%	Olin E. Teague
7th	29.8%	52.7%	17.5%	George H. W. Bush
8th	54.2%	21.4%	24.4%	Robert C. Eckhardt
9th	42.7%	32.3%	25.0%	Jack Brooks
10th	47.6%	38.4%	14.0%	J. J. Pickle
11th	50.5%	30.3%	19.1%	William R. Poage
12th	46.7%	40.4%	12.8%	Jim Wright
13th	37.9%	46.3%	15.9%	Graham B. Purcell Jr.
14th	50.1%	33.9%	16.0%	John Andrew Young
15th	56.6%	36.6%	6.8%	Kika de la Garza
16th	45.6%	42.8%	11.6%	Richard Crawford White
17th	43.7%	38.0%	18.3%	Omar Burleson
18th	28.8%	50.3%	21.0%	Robert Price
19th	31.1%	47.1%	27.1%	George H. Mahon
20th	70.7%	23.3%	6.0%	Henry B. González
21st	32.6%	51.2%	16.2%	O. C. Fisher
22nd	40.4%	43.7%	15.9%	Robert R. Casey
23rd	54.4%	32.9%	12.6%	Abraham Kazen

== Analysis ==
Precinct results in Dallas County, displaying the stark differences in voting patterns between the city's urban core, suburban north, and rural outskirts.

Humphrey performed best in the state's cities and rural areas, whereas Nixon performed best in the state's suburban areas. In cities, Humphrey won 43.5% of the vote to Nixon's 42.3% and Wallace's 14.2%. In the suburbs, Nixon won 41.9% of the vote to Humphrey's 35.3% and Wallace's 22.8%. In rural areas, Humphrey won 41.4% of the vote to Nixon's 34.5% and Wallace's 23.6%. In the state's metropolitan areas, Humphrey overwhelmingly won the African American vote in inner urban precincts, while Nixon won the inner suburbs by wide margins.

With his win in Texas, the state was the only former Confederate State in 1968 to vote Democratic. As of the 2024 presidential election, this is the last occasion the following counties have supported the Democratic candidate: Blanco, Nacogdoches, Rockwall and Scurry. The 1968 election is also the last when the following Wallace counties have not voted Republican: Crane, Glasscock, Montgomery and Rusk. It was the only election between 1924 and 2012 when Val Verde County backed a losing presidential candidate.

This was the last time a Republican won the presidency while losing Texas. This was also the last time until 2008 that a Northern Democrat won any state in the former Confederacy.

== See also ==
- United States presidential elections in Texas

== Works cited ==
- Black, Earl; Black, Merle (1992). The Vital South: How Presidents Are Elected. Harvard University Press. ISBN 0674941306.
- Tarrance Jr., V. Lance (1970). Texas Precinct Votes '68. Dallas, Texas: Southern Methodist University Press. LCCN 75-125978.
