= KPHS (disambiguation) =

KPHS may refer to:

- KPHS-LD, a low-power television station (channel 14) licensed to serve Lovelock, Nevada, United States; see List of television stations in Nevada
- KPHS, a defunct radio station (90.3 FM) formerly licensed to Plains, Texas, United States
- Kings Park High School, New York, USA
- Kingsway Park High School, Rochdale, England, UK
