= 1948 United States presidential election in Texas =

- November 2, 1948

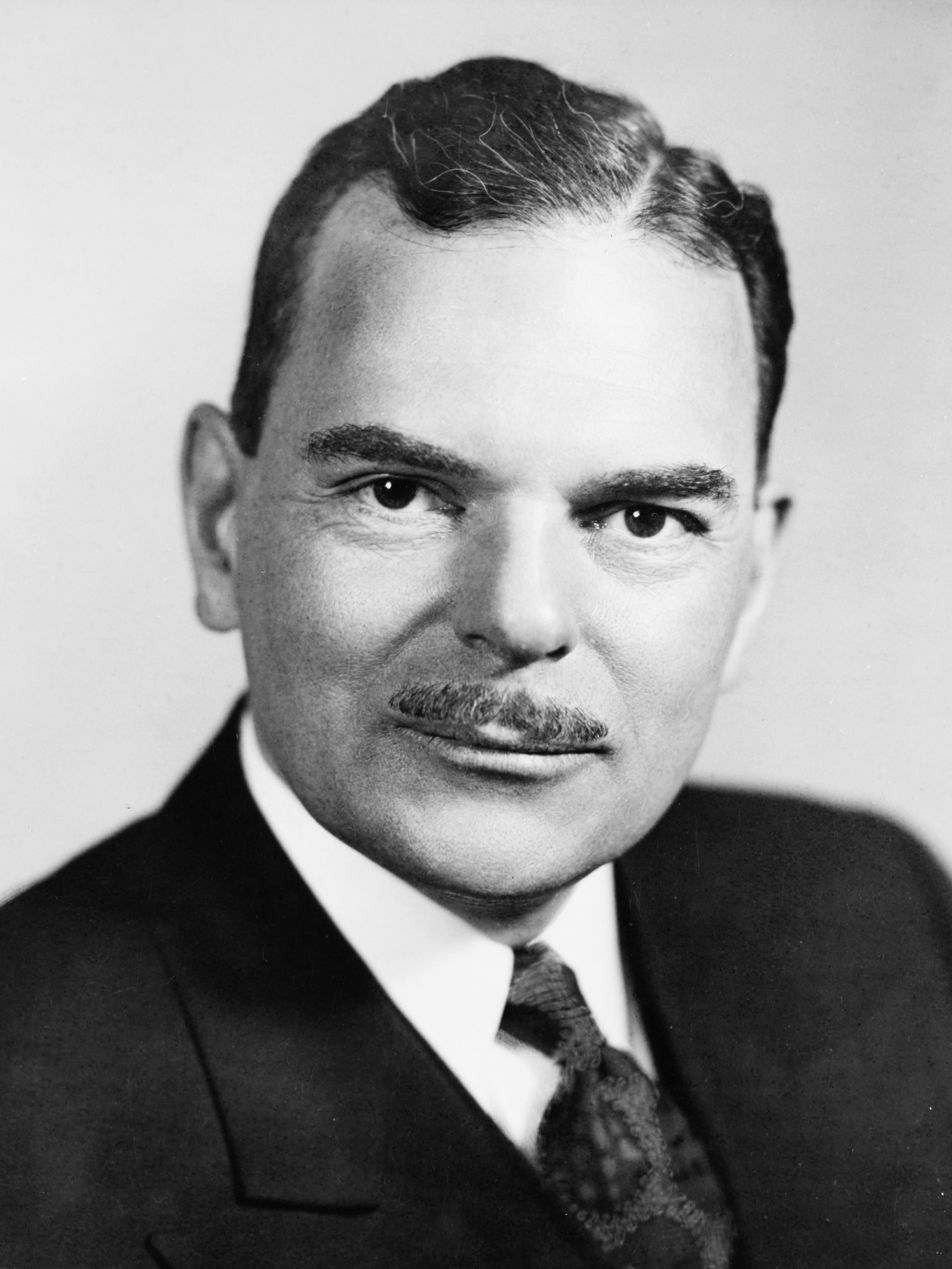

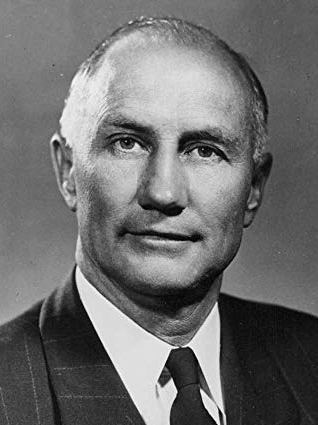
Nominee	Harry S. Truman	Thomas E. Dewey	Strom Thurmond
Party	Democratic	Republican	States' Rights Democratic
Home state	Missouri	New York	South Carolina
Running mate	Alben W. Barkley	Earl Warren	Fielding L. Wright
Electoral vote	23	0	0
Popular vote	824,235	303,467	113,776
Percentage	65.96%	24.29%	9.11%
County results
Truman
40–50%
50–60%
60–70%
70–80%
80–90%
90–100%
Dewey
40–50%
50–60%
60–70%
80–90%
President before election
Harry S. Truman
Democratic
Elected President
Harry S. Truman
Democratic

The 1948 United States presidential election in Texas was held on November 2, 1948. Texas voters chose 23 electors to represent the state in the Electoral College, which chose the president and vice president.

As a former Confederate state, Texas had a history of Jim Crow laws, disenfranchisement of its African-American and Mexican-American populations, and single-party Democratic rule outside a few Unionist German-American counties (chiefly Gillespie and Kendall) of Central Texas. However, President Harry S. Truman was attempting to launch a civil rights bill, involving desegregation of the military, which led to severe opposition from Southern Democrats, who aimed to have South Carolina Governor Strom Thurmond listed as Democratic presidential nominee and Mississippi Governor Fielding Wright as the vice-presidential nominee. Thurmond, whose ticket was formally called the States' Rights Democratic Party and more popularly known as the Dixiecrats, was leading Truman in early polls even in the major metropolitan counties of Dallas and Harris, which suggested he would claim the state. Texas' large number of electoral votes made it a coveted prize in Thurmond's quest to take the election into the House of Representatives.

At the time of this poll it remained uncertain as to whether Truman or Thurmond would be the official Democratic nominee in Texas. Unlike Oklahoma, Tennessee, North Carolina or Virginia, Texas did not have a major threat from the Republican Party to block local Democratic support for Thurmond, but it had only a third the proportion of blacks found in Mississippi or South Carolina. More critically, Texas' party hierarchy was dominated by Truman loyalists, most critically Governor Beauford Jester, and by mid-September it was clear that Truman would be the official Democratic nominee in Texas.

Truman campaigned in Texas during late September, ignoring civil rights and focusing entirely upon Dewey. The President's criticism of Dewey was largely focused on improving the transmission of hydroelectric power from dams at lower rates than Dewey had planned.

Thurmond won 10% of white voters.

== Polls ==
Source	Ranking	As of
Chattanooga Daily Times	Certain D	October 15, 1948
The Montgomery Advertiser	Safe D	October 24, 1948
The Miami News	Safe D	October 25, 1948
Mount Vernon Argus	Safe D	November 1, 1948
Oakland Tribune	Certain D	November 1, 1948

== Results ==
1948 United States presidential election in Texas
Party	Candidate	Votes	Percentage	Electoral votes
Democratic	Harry S. Truman (incumbent)	824,235	65.96%	23
Republican	Thomas E. Dewey	303,467	24.29%	0
States' Rights Democratic	Strom Thurmond	113,776	9.11%	0
Progressive	Henry A. Wallace	3,920	0.31%	0
Prohibition	Claude Watson	3,115	0.25%	0
Socialist	Norman Thomas	919	0.07%	0
Other	Write-ins	145	0.01%	0
Total		1,249,577	100.0%	23
Voter turnout (Voting age)		26%		

=== Results by county ===
1948 United States presidential election in Texas by county
County	Harry S. Truman Democratic		Thomas E. Dewey Republican		Strom Thurmond States' Rights Democratic		Henry A. Wallace Progressive		Various candidates Other parties		Margin		Total votes cast
County	#	%	#	%	#	%	#	%	#	%	#	%	Total votes cast
Anderson	3,242	62.37%	1,199	23.07%	735	14.14%	3	0.06%	19	0.37%	2,043	39.30%	5,198
Andrews	816	85.27%	101	10.55%	35	3.66%	5	0.52%	0	0.00%	715	74.72%	957
Angelina	4,377	69.05%	1,000	15.78%	928	14.64%	6	0.09%	28	0.44%	3,377	53.27%	6,339
Aransas	418	61.02%	235	34.31%	26	3.80%	4	0.58%	2	0.29%	183	26.71%	685
Archer	1,599	86.20%	191	10.30%	58	3.13%	0	0.00%	7	0.38%	1,408	75.90%	1,855
Armstrong	686	84.07%	97	11.89%	31	3.80%	2	0.25%	0	0.00%	589	72.18%	816
Atascosa	1,895	69.36%	704	25.77%	120	4.39%	4	0.15%	9	0.33%	1,191	43.59%	2,732
Austin	1,252	43.70%	1,260	43.98%	345	12.04%	2	0.07%	6	0.21%	-8	-0.28%	2,865
Bailey	1,115	76.79%	234	16.12%	93	6.40%	1	0.07%	9	0.62%	881	60.67%	1,452
Bandera	445	39.31%	570	50.35%	107	9.45%	1	0.09%	9	0.80%	-125	-11.04%	1,132
Bastrop	2,518	77.79%	443	13.69%	265	8.19%	5	0.15%	6	0.19%	2,075	64.10%	3,237
Baylor	1,522	90.81%	101	6.03%	47	2.80%	3	0.18%	3	0.18%	1,421	84.78%	1,676
Bee	1,441	60.70%	801	33.74%	123	5.18%	4	0.17%	5	0.21%	640	26.96%	2,374
Bell	7,548	82.83%	1,069	11.73%	436	4.78%	41	0.45%	19	0.21%	6,479	71.10%	9,113
Bexar	35,970	54.27%	26,202	39.53%	3,418	5.16%	384	0.58%	305	0.46%	9,768	14.74%	66,279
Blanco	1,003	63.93%	497	31.68%	66	4.21%	2	0.13%	1	0.06%	506	32.25%	1,569
Borden	203	87.12%	18	7.73%	9	3.86%	0	0.00%	3	1.29%	185	79.39%	233
Bosque	2,303	77.91%	501	16.95%	141	4.77%	6	0.20%	5	0.17%	1,802	60.96%	2,956
Bowie	7,028	67.95%	1,161	11.22%	2,096	20.26%	34	0.33%	24	0.23%	4,932 (Note: In this county where Thurmond ran second ahead of Dewey, margin given is Truman vote minus Thurmond vote and percentage margin Truman percentage minus Thurmond percentage.)	47.69%	10,343
Brazoria	4,783	57.19%	2,133	25.51%	1,408	16.84%	15	0.18%	24	0.29%	2,650	31.68%	8,363
Brazos	3,459	62.55%	1,533	27.72%	522	9.44%	6	0.11%	10	0.18%	1,926	34.83%	5,530
Brewster	940	70.10%	312	23.27%	82	6.11%	2	0.15%	5	0.37%	628	46.83%	1,341
Briscoe	692	85.75%	83	10.29%	28	3.47%	1	0.12%	3	0.37%	609	75.46%	807
Brooks	1,029	80.27%	217	16.93%	30	2.34%	3	0.23%	3	0.23%	812	63.34%	1,282
Brown	5,059	78.06%	1,071	16.53%	327	5.05%	3	0.05%	21	0.32%	3,988	61.53%	6,481
Burleson	2,051	84.26%	240	9.86%	135	5.55%	2	0.08%	6	0.25%	1,811	74.40%	2,434
Burnet	1,955	84.12%	287	12.35%	78	3.36%	1	0.04%	3	0.13%	1,668	71.77%	2,324
Caldwell	2,792	77.21%	623	17.23%	169	4.67%	9	0.25%	23	0.64%	2,169	59.98%	3,616
Calhoun	589	57.18%	346	33.59%	87	8.45%	0	0.00%	8	0.78%	243	23.59%	1,030
Callahan	1,844	83.40%	258	11.67%	104	4.70%	1	0.05%	4	0.18%	1,586	71.73%	2,211
Cameron	6,778	57.15%	4,689	39.54%	342	2.88%	20	0.17%	30	0.25%	2,089	17.61%	11,859
Camp	923	62.03%	180	12.10%	385	25.87%	0	0.00%	0	0.00%	538	36.16%	1,488
Carson	1,301	74.17%	413	23.55%	32	1.82%	5	0.29%	3	0.17%	888	50.62%	1,754
Cass	2,540	65.14%	457	11.72%	878	22.52%	3	0.08%	21	0.54%	1,662	42.62%	3,899
Castro	1,158	84.28%	189	13.76%	20	1.46%	1	0.07%	6	0.44%	969	70.52%	1,374
Chambers	787	56.54%	302	21.70%	299	21.48%	0	0.00%	4	0.29%	485	34.84%	1,392
Cherokee	3,079	64.07%	1,154	24.01%	544	11.32%	4	0.08%	25	0.52%	1,925	40.06%	4,806
Childress	2,415	86.22%	273	9.75%	94	3.36%	4	0.14%	15	0.54%	2,142	76.47%	2,801
Clay	2,131	82.50%	332	12.85%	107	4.14%	2	0.08%	11	0.43%	1,799	69.65%	2,583
Cochran	971	81.87%	119	10.03%	94	7.93%	0	0.00%	2	0.17%	852	71.84%	1,186
Coke	909	90.18%	65	6.45%	30	2.98%	4	0.40%	0	0.00%	844	83.73%	1,008
Coleman	2,695	78.59%	545	15.89%	176	5.13%	2	0.06%	11	0.32%	2,150	62.70%	3,429
Collin	5,516	76.08%	1,155	15.93%	543	7.49%	17	0.23%	19	0.26%	4,361	60.15%	7,250
Collingsworth	1,779	85.16%	198	9.48%	98	4.69%	5	0.24%	9	0.43%	1,581	75.68%	2,089
Colorado	1,316	41.71%	900	28.53%	930	29.48%	3	0.10%	6	0.19%	386	12.23%	3,155
Comal	1,212	39.43%	1,752	56.99%	105	3.42%	2	0.07%	3	0.10%	-540	-17.56%	3,074
Comanche	2,915	83.17%	408	11.64%	164	4.68%	1	0.03%	17	0.49%	2,507	71.53%	3,505
Concho	1,156	85.88%	174	12.93%	12	0.89%	3	0.22%	1	0.07%	982	72.95%	1,346
Cooke	3,241	64.48%	1,194	23.76%	564	11.22%	10	0.20%	17	0.34%	2,047	40.72%	5,026
Coryell	2,350	85.11%	310	11.23%	88	3.19%	1	0.04%	12	0.43%	2,040	73.88%	2,761
Cottle	1,318	90.71%	102	7.02%	32	2.20%	0	0.00%	1	0.07%	1,216	83.69%	1,453
Crane	812	88.17%	70	7.60%	37	4.02%	0	0.00%	2	0.22%	742	80.57%	921
Crockett	400	73.39%	127	23.30%	18	3.30%	0	0.00%	0	0.00%	273	50.09%	545
Crosby	1,731	83.66%	168	8.12%	158	7.64%	0	0.00%	12	0.58%	1,563	75.54%	2,069
Culberson	244	79.74%	38	12.42%	22	7.19%	0	0.00%	2	0.65%	206	67.32%	306
Dallam	1,504	77.41%	399	20.54%	28	1.44%	3	0.15%	9	0.46%	1,105	56.87%	1,943
Dallas	47,464	50.31%	35,664	37.80%	10,162	10.77%	536	0.57%	518	0.55%	11,800	12.51%	94,344
Dawson	2,605	82.94%	393	12.51%	136	4.33%	1	0.03%	6	0.19%	2,212	70.43%	3,141
Deaf Smith	1,496	71.61%	535	25.61%	42	2.01%	1	0.05%	15	0.72%	961	46.00%	2,089
Delta	1,594	83.89%	146	7.68%	132	6.95%	4	0.21%	24	1.26%	1,448	76.21%	1,900
Denton	4,549	65.42%	1,531	22.02%	824	11.85%	24	0.35%	25	0.36%	3,018	43.40%	6,953
De Witt	1,808	49.57%	1,612	44.20%	214	5.87%	5	0.14%	8	0.22%	196	5.37%	3,647
Dickens	1,492	87.76%	115	6.76%	83	4.88%	1	0.06%	9	0.53%	1,377	81.00%	1,700
Dimmit	863	65.48%	384	29.14%	60	4.55%	5	0.38%	6	0.46%	479	36.34%	1,318
Donley	1,372	81.09%	241	14.24%	71	4.20%	3	0.18%	5	0.30%	1,131	66.85%	1,692
Duval	3,551	96.52%	117	3.18%	11	0.30%	0	0.00%	0	0.00%	3,434	93.34%	3,679
Eastland	5,121	76.83%	1,177	17.66%	329	4.94%	7	0.11%	31	0.47%	3,944	59.17%	6,665
Ector	4,305	75.61%	1,145	20.11%	231	4.06%	9	0.16%	4	0.07%	3,160	55.50%	5,694
Edwards	329	61.04%	185	34.32%	21	3.90%	1	0.19%	3	0.56%	144	26.72%	539
Ellis	5,792	75.56%	1,055	13.76%	782	10.20%	15	0.20%	21	0.27%	4,737	61.80%	7,665
El Paso	15,341	71.53%	5,544	25.85%	395	1.84%	148	0.69%	20	0.09%	9,797	45.68%	21,448
Erath	3,172	79.26%	598	14.94%	206	5.15%	6	0.15%	20	0.50%	2,574	64.32%	4,002
Falls	3,385	80.25%	546	12.94%	271	6.42%	7	0.17%	9	0.21%	2,839	67.31%	4,218
Fannin	6,132	86.79%	553	7.83%	364	5.15%	5	0.07%	11	0.16%	5,579	78.96%	7,065
Fayette	3,106	58.63%	1,737	32.79%	429	8.10%	17	0.32%	9	0.17%	1,369	25.84%	5,298
Fisher	2,063	90.28%	149	6.52%	66	2.89%	3	0.13%	4	0.18%	1,914	83.76%	2,285
Floyd	2,174	81.94%	344	12.97%	119	4.49%	1	0.04%	15	0.57%	1,830	68.97%	2,653
Foard	751	85.73%	90	10.27%	32	3.65%	1	0.11%	2	0.23%	661	75.46%	876
Fort Bend	2,058	56.96%	1,016	28.12%	519	14.36%	15	0.42%	5	0.14%	1,042	28.84%	3,613
Franklin	1,236	80.94%	146	9.56%	135	8.84%	1	0.07%	9	0.59%	1,090	71.38%	1,527
Freestone	2,265	70.12%	460	14.24%	483	14.95%	11	0.34%	11	0.34%	1,782	55.17%	3,230
Frio	898	66.96%	345	25.73%	91	6.79%	1	0.07%	6	0.45%	553	41.23%	1,341
Gaines	1,465	81.66%	207	11.54%	107	5.96%	5	0.28%	10	0.56%	1,258	70.12%	1,794
Galveston	12,491	66.47%	4,857	25.85%	1,266	6.74%	138	0.73%	40	0.21%	7,634	40.62%	18,792
Garza	861	77.57%	176	15.86%	63	5.68%	3	0.27%	7	0.63%	685	61.71%	1,110
Gillespie	593	17.37%	2,741	80.31%	77	2.26%	0	0.00%	2	0.06%	-2,148	-62.94%	3,413
Glasscock	188	67.63%	69	24.82%	16	5.76%	2	0.72%	3	1.08%	119	42.81%	278
Goliad	454	43.86%	450	43.48%	127	12.27%	0	0.00%	4	0.39%	4	0.38%	1,035
Gonzales	2,612	72.58%	666	18.51%	305	8.47%	8	0.22%	8	0.22%	1,946	54.07%	3,599
Gray	3,699	64.94%	1,594	27.98%	384	6.74%	4	0.07%	15	0.26%	2,105	36.96%	5,696
Grayson	10,991	77.69%	2,174	15.37%	953	6.74%	12	0.08%	18	0.13%	8,817	62.32%	14,148
Gregg	5,104	48.31%	2,477	23.45%	2,917	27.61%	24	0.23%	43	0.41%	2,187	20.70%	10,565
Grimes	901	52.38%	336	19.53%	476	27.67%	2	0.12%	5	0.29%	425	24.71%	1,720
Guadalupe	2,119	43.17%	2,502	50.98%	259	5.28%	20	0.41%	8	0.16%	-383	-7.81%	4,908
Hale	3,995	75.24%	1,013	19.08%	269	5.07%	9	0.17%	24	0.45%	2,982	56.16%	5,310
Hall	2,122	89.31%	174	7.32%	76	3.20%	1	0.04%	3	0.13%	1,948	81.99%	2,376
Hamilton	1,725	73.75%	478	20.44%	130	5.56%	4	0.17%	2	0.09%	1,247	53.31%	2,339
Hansford	895	79.34%	206	18.26%	17	1.51%	9	0.80%	1	0.09%	689	61.08%	1,128
Hardeman	1,654	83.70%	226	11.44%	86	4.35%	3	0.15%	7	0.35%	1,428	72.26%	1,976
Hardin	2,233	73.38%	196	6.44%	595	19.55%	9	0.30%	10	0.33%	1,638	53.83%	3,043
Harris	58,488	47.70%	43,117	35.16%	19,934	16.26%	760	0.62%	318	0.26%	15,371	12.54%	122,617
Harrison	2,504	44.81%	946	16.93%	2,106	37.69%	6	0.11%	26	0.47%	398	7.12%	5,588
Hartley	477	84.13%	83	14.64%	5	0.88%	0	0.00%	2	0.35%	394	69.49%	567
Haskell	2,735	91.20%	181	6.04%	77	2.57%	4	0.13%	2	0.07%	2,554	85.16%	2,999
Hays	2,239	74.96%	555	18.58%	176	5.89%	9	0.30%	8	0.27%	1,684	56.38%	2,987
Hemphill	930	78.95%	201	17.06%	34	2.89%	2	0.17%	11	0.93%	729	61.89%	1,178
Henderson	3,669	83.14%	540	12.24%	197	4.46%	4	0.09%	3	0.07%	3,129	70.90%	4,413
Hidalgo	9,526	59.47%	6,220	38.83%	181	1.13%	29	0.18%	62	0.39%	3,306	20.64%	16,018
Hill	4,362	80.85%	657	12.18%	357	6.62%	6	0.11%	13	0.24%	3,705	68.67%	5,395
Hockley	3,071	84.58%	346	9.53%	199	5.48%	3	0.08%	12	0.33%	2,725	75.05%	3,631
Hood	1,273	84.64%	169	11.24%	56	3.72%	1	0.07%	5	0.33%	1,104	73.40%	1,504
Hopkins	3,885	83.24%	479	10.26%	284	6.09%	4	0.09%	15	0.32%	3,406	72.98%	4,667
Houston	2,014	64.88%	532	17.14%	541	17.43%	5	0.16%	12	0.39%	1,473	47.45%	3,104
Howard	4,179	82.72%	561	11.10%	285	5.64%	15	0.30%	12	0.24%	3,618	71.62%	5,052
Hudspeth	437	87.75%	49	9.84%	10	2.01%	1	0.20%	1	0.20%	388	77.91%	498
Hunt	5,082	71.91%	1,195	16.91%	763	10.80%	3	0.04%	24	0.34%	3,887	55.00%	7,067
Hutchinson	4,527	75.34%	1,382	23.00%	84	1.40%	6	0.10%	10	0.17%	3,145	52.34%	6,009
Irion	366	83.18%	63	14.32%	9	2.05%	2	0.45%	0	0.00%	303	68.86%	440
Jack	1,426	78.48%	265	14.58%	110	6.05%	1	0.06%	15	0.83%	1,161	63.90%	1,817
Jackson	1,343	68.10%	488	24.75%	122	6.19%	12	0.61%	7	0.35%	855	43.35%	1,972
Jasper	1,777	70.32%	284	11.24%	450	17.81%	5	0.20%	11	0.44%	1,327	52.51%	2,527
Jeff Davis	309	76.87%	75	18.66%	17	4.23%	0	0.00%	1	0.25%	234	58.21%	402
Jefferson	22,475	67.06%	5,749	17.15%	5,108	15.24%	119	0.36%	63	0.19%	16,726	49.91%	33,514
Jim Hogg	725	87.45%	73	8.81%	29	3.50%	1	0.12%	1	0.12%	652	78.64%	829
Jim Wells	3,781	71.35%	1,402	26.46%	101	1.91%	1	0.02%	14	0.26%	2,379	44.89%	5,299
Johnson	4,042	77.70%	707	13.59%	434	8.34%	4	0.08%	15	0.29%	3,335	64.11%	5,202
Jones	3,599	86.16%	432	10.34%	132	3.16%	3	0.07%	11	0.26%	3,167	75.82%	4,177
Karnes	2,198	73.98%	592	19.93%	176	5.92%	2	0.07%	3	0.10%	1,606	54.05%	2,971
Kaufman	3,479	71.15%	764	15.62%	629	12.86%	11	0.22%	7	0.14%	2,715	55.53%	4,890
Kendall	511	28.56%	1,207	67.47%	65	3.63%	2	0.11%	4	0.22%	-696	-38.91%	1,789
Kenedy	45	55.56%	31	38.27%	5	6.17%	0	0.00%	0	0.00%	14	17.29%	81
Kent	479	89.70%	33	6.18%	22	4.12%	0	0.00%	0	0.00%	446	83.52%	534
Kerr	1,505	46.97%	1,520	47.44%	162	5.06%	8	0.25%	9	0.28%	-15	-0.47%	3,204
Kimble	851	68.08%	303	24.24%	95	7.60%	0	0.00%	1	0.08%	548	43.84%	1,250
King	231	95.85%	6	2.49%	4	1.66%	0	0.00%	0	0.00%	225	93.36%	241
Kinney	370	64.35%	175	30.43%	30	5.22%	0	0.00%	0	0.00%	195	33.92%	575
Kleberg	2,083	72.50%	697	24.26%	70	2.44%	11	0.38%	12	0.42%	1,386	48.24%	2,873
Knox	1,792	89.24%	157	7.82%	52	2.59%	0	0.00%	7	0.35%	1,635	81.42%	2,008
Lamar	6,306	75.39%	1,018	12.17%	1,015	12.13%	2	0.02%	24	0.29%	5,288	63.22%	8,365
Lamb	3,286	83.25%	475	12.03%	173	4.38%	7	0.18%	6	0.15%	2,811	71.22%	3,947
Lampasas	1,459	80.74%	276	15.27%	72	3.98%	0	0.00%	0	0.00%	1,183	65.47%	1,807
La Salle	719	78.75%	135	14.79%	57	6.24%	0	0.00%	2	0.22%	584	63.96%	913
Lavaca	3,046	67.52%	1,165	25.83%	265	5.87%	18	0.40%	17	0.38%	1,881	41.69%	4,511
Lee	1,540	72.57%	465	21.91%	109	5.14%	3	0.14%	5	0.24%	1,075	50.66%	2,122
Leon	1,231	72.84%	184	10.89%	271	16.04%	1	0.06%	3	0.18%	960	56.80%	1,690
Liberty	2,199	56.14%	735	18.76%	931	23.77%	12	0.31%	40	1.02%	1,268	32.37%	3,917
Limestone	3,289	72.57%	688	15.18%	510	11.25%	10	0.22%	35	0.77%	2,601	57.39%	4,532
Lipscomb	668	63.68%	354	33.75%	18	1.72%	1	0.10%	8	0.76%	314	29.93%	1,049
Live Oak	945	60.31%	479	30.57%	131	8.36%	4	0.26%	8	0.51%	466	29.74%	1,567
Llano	1,384	82.38%	253	15.06%	39	2.32%	3	0.18%	1	0.06%	1,131	67.32%	1,680
Loving	62	65.26%	29	30.53%	4	4.21%	0	0.00%	0	0.00%	33	34.73%	95
Lubbock	11,114	73.08%	2,837	18.66%	1,202	7.90%	30	0.20%	24	0.16%	8,277	54.42%	15,207
Lynn	2,179	86.16%	224	8.86%	120	4.74%	0	0.00%	6	0.24%	1,955	77.30%	2,529
Madison	801	70.63%	134	11.82%	188	16.58%	0	0.00%	11	0.97%	613	54.05%	1,134
Marion	703	64.97%	200	18.48%	159	14.70%	0	0.00%	20	1.85%	503	46.49%	1,082
Martin	945	87.74%	77	7.15%	52	4.83%	0	0.00%	3	0.28%	868	80.59%	1,077
Mason	836	61.65%	498	36.73%	14	1.03%	0	0.00%	8	0.59%	338	24.92%	1,356
Matagorda	1,628	49.35%	1,016	30.80%	640	19.40%	8	0.24%	7	0.21%	612	18.55%	3,299
Maverick	695	69.92%	270	27.16%	22	2.21%	6	0.60%	1	0.10%	425	42.76%	994
McCulloch	2,166	81.92%	393	14.86%	80	3.03%	0	0.00%	5	0.19%	1,773	67.06%	2,644
McLennan	16,034	79.55%	3,088	15.32%	913	4.53%	81	0.40%	41	0.20%	12,946	64.23%	20,157
McMullen	222	73.51%	61	20.20%	17	5.63%	1	0.33%	1	0.33%	161	53.31%	302
Medina	1,875	53.27%	1,492	42.39%	144	4.09%	4	0.11%	5	0.14%	383	10.88%	3,520
Menard	663	66.57%	283	28.41%	43	4.32%	1	0.10%	6	0.60%	380	38.16%	996
Midland	2,032	53.22%	1,410	36.93%	370	9.69%	1	0.03%	5	0.13%	622	16.29%	3,818
Milam	3,261	75.98%	646	15.05%	359	8.36%	15	0.35%	11	0.26%	2,615	60.93%	4,292
Mills	1,135	80.04%	205	14.46%	69	4.87%	5	0.35%	4	0.28%	930	65.58%	1,418
Mitchell	2,181	87.80%	230	9.26%	64	2.58%	1	0.04%	8	0.32%	1,951	78.54%	2,484
Montague	2,872	80.74%	475	13.35%	194	5.45%	2	0.06%	14	0.39%	2,397	67.39%	3,557
Montgomery	1,795	53.77%	544	16.30%	984	29.48%	3	0.09%	12	0.36%	811	24.29%	3,338
Moore	1,748	83.20%	323	15.37%	27	1.29%	1	0.05%	2	0.10%	1,425	67.83%	2,101
Morris	1,164	74.81%	143	9.19%	247	15.87%	0	0.00%	2	0.13%	917	58.94%	1,556
Motley	774	85.90%	75	8.32%	48	5.33%	1	0.11%	3	0.33%	699	77.58%	901
Nacogdoches	3,195	70.47%	833	18.37%	467	10.30%	4	0.09%	35	0.77%	2,362	52.10%	4,534
Navarro	4,679	72.05%	1,188	18.29%	587	9.04%	11	0.17%	29	0.45%	3,491	53.76%	6,494
Newton	957	68.41%	110	7.86%	316	22.59%	0	0.00%	16	1.14%	641	45.82%	1,399
Nolan	3,408	83.76%	552	13.57%	99	2.43%	5	0.12%	5	0.12%	2,856	70.19%	4,069
Nueces	15,240	69.96%	5,577	25.60%	754	3.46%	103	0.47%	109	0.50%	9,663	44.36%	21,783
Ochiltree	1,025	73.06%	344	24.52%	30	2.14%	0	0.00%	4	0.29%	681	48.54%	1,403
Oldham	339	74.02%	100	21.83%	18	3.93%	1	0.22%	0	0.00%	239	52.19%	458
Orange	4,957	72.76%	987	14.49%	851	12.49%	14	0.21%	4	0.06%	3,970	58.27%	6,813
Palo Pinto	3,736	74.05%	977	19.37%	297	5.89%	10	0.20%	25	0.50%	2,759	54.68%	5,045
Panola	1,751	62.14%	256	9.08%	792	28.11%	6	0.21%	13	0.46%	959	34.03%	2,818
Parker	3,061	75.02%	806	19.75%	180	4.41%	16	0.39%	17	0.42%	2,255	55.27%	4,080
Parmer	1,091	76.78%	280	19.70%	45	3.17%	0	0.00%	5	0.35%	811	57.08%	1,421
Pecos	1,430	79.40%	317	17.60%	51	2.83%	1	0.06%	2	0.11%	1,113	61.80%	1,801
Polk	1,422	62.64%	317	13.96%	518	22.82%	6	0.26%	7	0.31%	904	39.82%	2,270
Potter	9,622	67.66%	4,110	28.90%	414	2.91%	35	0.25%	41	0.29%	5,512	38.76%	14,222
Presidio	907	78.66%	212	18.39%	25	2.17%	7	0.61%	2	0.17%	695	60.27%	1,153
Rains	739	78.28%	111	11.76%	90	9.53%	3	0.32%	1	0.11%	628	66.52%	944
Randall	1,936	69.84%	722	26.05%	98	3.54%	12	0.43%	4	0.14%	1,214	43.79%	2,772
Reagan	444	76.68%	112	19.34%	21	3.63%	1	0.17%	1	0.17%	332	57.34%	579
Real	446	72.40%	156	25.32%	12	1.95%	0	0.00%	2	0.32%	290	47.08%	616
Red River	2,987	75.49%	323	8.16%	637	16.10%	5	0.13%	5	0.13%	2,350	59.39%	3,957
Reeves	1,383	77.31%	309	17.27%	95	5.31%	1	0.06%	1	0.06%	1,074	60.04%	1,789
Refugio	1,637	74.44%	489	22.24%	64	2.91%	4	0.18%	5	0.23%	1,148	52.20%	2,199
Roberts	317	75.84%	76	18.18%	25	5.98%	0	0.00%	0	0.00%	241	57.66%	418
Robertson	2,147	74.11%	246	8.49%	495	17.09%	1	0.03%	8	0.28%	1,652	57.02%	2,897
Rockwall	947	75.64%	117	9.35%	164	13.10%	3	0.24%	21	1.68%	783	62.54%	1,252
Runnels	2,954	81.72%	526	14.55%	117	3.24%	9	0.25%	9	0.25%	2,428	67.17%	3,615
Rusk	4,322	58.60%	1,294	17.55%	1,730	23.46%	11	0.15%	18	0.24%	2,592	35.14%	7,375
Sabine	1,078	75.28%	104	7.26%	238	16.62%	3	0.21%	9	0.63%	840	58.66%	1,432
San Augustine	858	67.83%	137	10.83%	249	19.68%	0	0.00%	21	1.66%	609	48.15%	1,265
San Jacinto	509	65.76%	106	13.70%	153	19.77%	3	0.39%	3	0.39%	356	45.99%	774
San Patricio	2,649	69.29%	963	25.19%	181	4.73%	15	0.39%	15	0.39%	1,686	44.10%	3,823
San Saba	2,050	89.01%	184	7.99%	65	2.82%	0	0.00%	4	0.17%	1,866	81.02%	2,303
Schleicher	495	76.74%	107	16.59%	43	6.67%	0	0.00%	0	0.00%	388	60.15%	645
Scurry	2,040	88.39%	201	8.71%	55	2.38%	3	0.13%	9	0.39%	1,839	79.68%	2,308
Shackelford	892	77.84%	211	18.41%	43	3.75%	0	0.00%	0	0.00%	681	59.43%	1,146
Shelby	3,051	75.59%	307	7.61%	666	16.50%	2	0.05%	10	0.25%	2,385	59.09%	4,036
Sherman	479	80.91%	98	16.55%	10	1.69%	0	0.00%	5	0.84%	381	64.36%	592
Smith	6,473	57.24%	3,181	28.13%	1,600	14.15%	17	0.15%	38	0.34%	3,292	29.11%	11,309
Somervell	446	76.50%	91	15.61%	46	7.89%	0	0.00%	0	0.00%	355	60.89%	583
Starr	1,996	91.22%	179	8.18%	10	0.46%	2	0.09%	1	0.05%	1,817	83.04%	2,188
Stephens	2,132	73.77%	572	19.79%	164	5.67%	11	0.38%	11	0.38%	1,560	53.98%	2,890
Sterling	244	91.04%	17	6.34%	7	2.61%	0	0.00%	0	0.00%	227	84.70%	268
Stonewall	968	90.98%	65	6.11%	28	2.63%	1	0.09%	2	0.19%	903	84.87%	1,064
Sutton	433	69.61%	131	21.06%	58	9.32%	0	0.00%	0	0.00%	302	48.55%	622
Swisher	1,670	81.78%	307	15.03%	57	2.79%	2	0.10%	6	0.29%	1,363	66.75%	2,042
Tarrant	36,325	59.81%	17,157	28.25%	6,932	11.41%	160	0.26%	165	0.27%	19,168	31.56%	60,739
Taylor	8,184	78.90%	1,658	15.98%	478	4.61%	14	0.13%	39	0.38%	6,526	62.92%	10,373
Terrell	171	64.53%	78	29.43%	14	5.28%	1	0.38%	1	0.38%	93	35.10%	265
Terry	2,283	85.03%	236	8.79%	152	5.66%	2	0.07%	12	0.45%	2,047	76.24%	2,685
Throckmorton	1,026	91.61%	63	5.63%	30	2.68%	1	0.09%	0	0.00%	963	85.98%	1,120
Titus	2,339	76.56%	379	12.41%	332	10.87%	1	0.03%	4	0.13%	1,960	64.15%	3,055
Tom Green	6,777	74.34%	1,822	19.99%	481	5.28%	13	0.14%	23	0.25%	4,955	54.35%	9,116
Travis	19,598	72.03%	5,994	22.03%	1,252	4.60%	203	0.75%	160	0.59%	13,604	50.00%	27,207
Trinity	905	68.82%	150	11.41%	250	19.01%	3	0.23%	7	0.53%	655	49.81%	1,315
Tyler	895	57.70%	177	11.41%	466	30.05%	2	0.13%	11	0.71%	429	27.65%	1,551
Upshur	2,118	66.92%	555	17.54%	485	15.32%	1	0.03%	6	0.19%	1,563	49.38%	3,165
Upton	811	79.20%	155	15.14%	55	5.37%	1	0.10%	2	0.20%	656	64.06%	1,024
Uvalde	1,550	60.90%	866	34.03%	114	4.48%	0	0.00%	15	0.59%	684	26.87%	2,545
Val Verde	1,242	62.79%	672	33.97%	63	3.19%	0	0.00%	1	0.05%	570	28.82%	1,978
Van Zandt	3,264	75.03%	578	13.29%	463	10.64%	11	0.25%	34	0.78%	2,686	61.74%	4,350
Victoria	2,435	60.24%	1,262	31.22%	328	8.11%	10	0.25%	7	0.17%	1,173	29.02%	4,042
Walker	1,439	56.12%	570	22.23%	542	21.14%	1	0.04%	12	0.47%	869	33.89%	2,564
Waller	812	49.69%	448	27.42%	359	21.97%	12	0.73%	3	0.18%	364	22.27%	1,634
Ward	2,119	79.72%	414	15.58%	118	4.44%	5	0.19%	2	0.08%	1,705	64.14%	2,658
Washington	1,647	44.01%	1,904	50.88%	190	5.08%	1	0.03%	0	0.00%	-257	-6.87%	3,742
Webb	4,595	80.68%	1,004	17.63%	53	0.93%	39	0.68%	4	0.07%	3,591	63.05%	5,695
Wharton	2,811	60.00%	1,354	28.90%	484	10.33%	24	0.51%	12	0.26%	1,457	31.10%	4,685
Wheeler	2,010	81.71%	370	15.04%	67	2.72%	2	0.08%	11	0.45%	1,640	66.67%	2,460
Wichita	12,235	77.11%	2,887	18.20%	683	4.30%	29	0.18%	32	0.20%	9,348	58.91%	15,866
Wilbarger	2,963	77.97%	529	13.92%	295	7.76%	6	0.16%	7	0.18%	2,434	64.05%	3,800
Willacy	1,139	59.20%	676	35.14%	99	5.15%	5	0.26%	5	0.26%	463	24.06%	1,924
Williamson	5,638	80.24%	1,094	15.57%	258	3.67%	26	0.37%	10	0.14%	4,544	64.67%	7,026
Wilson	2,313	76.59%	593	19.64%	108	3.58%	5	0.17%	1	0.03%	1,720	56.95%	3,020
Winkler	1,588	80.08%	296	14.93%	90	4.54%	2	0.10%	7	0.35%	1,292	65.15%	1,983
Wise	3,064	81.10%	448	11.86%	254	6.72%	3	0.08%	9	0.24%	2,616	69.24%	3,778
Wood	2,590	66.67%	629	16.19%	642	16.53%	9	0.23%	15	0.39%	1,948	50.14%	3,885
Yoakum	861	84.41%	119	11.67%	32	3.14%	4	0.39%	4	0.39%	742	72.74%	1,020
Young	3,175	81.45%	516	13.24%	186	4.77%	4	0.10%	17	0.44%	2,659	68.21%	3,898
Zapata	632	60.36%	414	39.54%	1	0.10%	0	0.00%	0	0.00%	218	20.82%	1,047
Zavala	618	62.68%	306	31.03%	58	5.88%	3	0.30%	1	0.10%	312	31.65%	986
Totals	824,235	65.96%	303,467	24.29%	113,921	9.12%	3,913	0.31%	4,041	0.32%	520,768	41.67%	1,249,577

==== Counties that flipped from Republican to Democratic ====
- Kenedy
- Medina

Counties that flipped from Democratic to Republican

- Austin
- Kerr

==== Counties that flipped from Unpledged to Republican ====
- Washington

== Analysis ==
Texas overwhelmingly voted for incumbent Democratic President Harry S. Truman, who took 66 percent of the state's vote, to Republican Thomas E. Dewey's 25.3 percent. Texas was Truman's strongest state, and one of only four in the country which gave him at least sixty percent of the popular vote. Truman carried 246 out of the state's 254 counties, to Dewey's eight. South Carolina Governor Strom Thurmond, a segregationist Democrat, ran as the Dixiecrat nominee. Despite dominating in the neighboring Deep South, Thurmond received only nine percent of Texas' popular vote and failed to carry any counties in the state. including those in East Texas, the region in Texas most closely culturally tied to the Deep South. The Dixiecrat ticket did, nonetheless, run second behind Truman in thirty counties. Dewey's strongest performance was Gillespie County in the Texas Hill Country, which gave him over eighty percent of the vote.

This is one of the last presidential elections in Texas in which the following regions were considered strongholds for the Democratic Party: West Texas, the Texas Panhandle, and the Texas Hill Country. Although several Democratic candidates would win a majority of the counties in these regions in future presidential elections, notably Texas native Lyndon B. Johnson in 1964, these regions were amongst the first in the state to begin splitting their tickets by voting for Republicans on the national level while continuing to vote Democratic at the state level.

This is the last occasion the Plains counties of Ector, Gray, Hansford, Hutchinson, Lipscomb, Midland, Ochiltree, Randall, and Roberts have voted for a Democratic presidential candidate. In the 21st century, these counties typically give over ninety percent of their vote to Republican nominees, while Roberts and Ochiltree have alternated as the nation's most Republican county. Additionally, 1948 constitutes the last election when Gregg County and Smith County in East Texas, plus Edwards County at the western extremity of its namesake plateau, have voted for the Democratic presidential nominee. As a result of Dallas and Harris counties seeing their populations increase as a result of Republican-leaning northern expatriates moving into the state, this would be the last occasion with the exception of Lyndon B. Johnson's landslide win in the state in 1964 that these two counties backed Democratic presidential candidates until Barack Obama won them back in 2008. As of 2024, Dewey remains the last major party nominee to fail to win at least thirty percent of Texas's popular vote in a presidential election.

== See also ==
- United States presidential elections in Texas

== Works cited ==
- Black, Earl; Black, Merle (1992). The Vital South: How Presidents Are Elected. Harvard University Press. ISBN 0674941306.
