= Yoakum County, Texas =

County in Texas, United States

- County
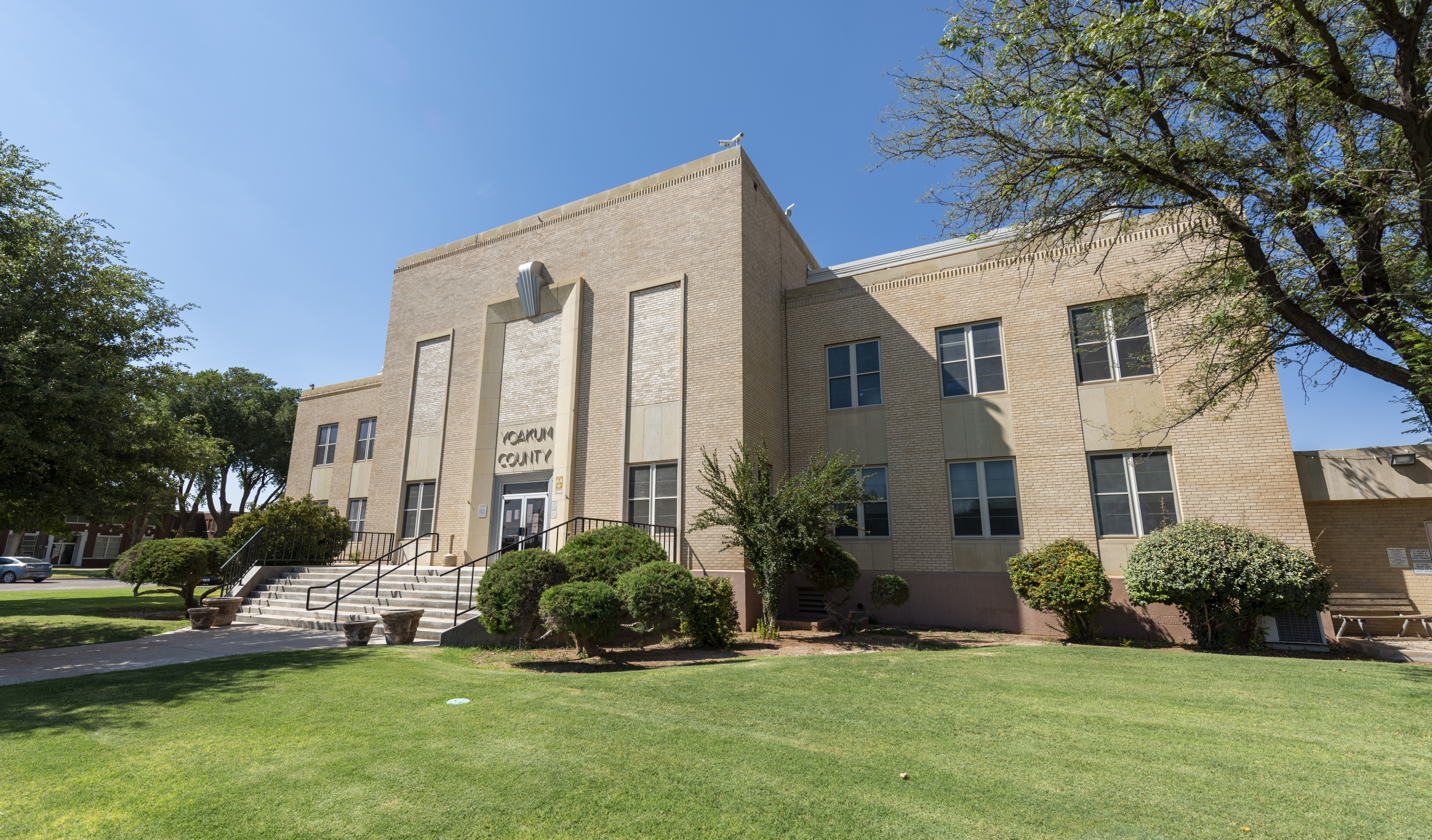
- The Yoakum County Courthouse in Plains.

- Location within the U.S. state of Texas
- Coordinates: 33°11′N 102°49′W
- Country: United States
- State: Texas
- Founded: 1907
- Seat: Plains
- Largest town: Denver City

Area
  - Total: 800 sq mi (2,100 km^{2})
  - Land: 800 sq mi (2,100 km^{2})
  - Water: 0.01 sq mi (0.026 km^{2}) 0%

Population (2020)
  - Total: 7,694
  - Estimate (2025): 7,438 ▼
  - Density: 9.6/sq mi (3.7/km^{2})
- Congressional district: 19th
- Website: www.yoakumcounty.gov

Yoakum County is a county located in the western Panhandle portion of the U.S. state of Texas. As of the 2020 census, its population was 7,694. Its county seat is Plains. The county was created in 1876 and later organized in 1907. It is named for Henderson King Yoakum, a Texas historian.

Until the passage of a liquor sales referendum held on May 11, 2013, Yoakum had been one of 19 remaining prohibition or entirely dry counties within Texas. Voters in Denver City also approved a separate referendum to permit liquor sales within that community.

In 1965, Recorded Texas Historic Landmark number 5927 was placed at the county courthouse, acknowledging the creation of the county in 1876.

Until 1900, the county contained primarily nomadic buffalo hunters and a few scattered ranchers. Yoakum County was organized in 1907, and the population increased to 602 because of the sale of state land deeds.

== History ==
=== Native Americans ===
Early tribes included Suma-Jumano, Comanche, Cheyenne, and Kiowa.

The Comanches and Indians before them knew that the sand dunes that one can still see today called the Lea-Yoakum Sand Dunes and those visible around Denver City did not signify a desert. Instead, these dunes are remnants of an ancient river system that once flowed northwest to southeast through the area. Indians knew to dig beneath the surface of the sand dunes to find water, so they frequented the sand dunes to hunt the plentiful game once there, and perform sacred rites during their encampments. Evidence of these visits to the area by Comanche, Kiowa, and prehistoric Indians before them was discovered in the 20th century by local ranchers and verified by archaeologists.

A Quanah Parker Trail arrow, installed December 14, 2011, marked Denver City as a place with historic ties to the Comanche and other native peoples who once hunted and lived in the region. In March 2015, Denver City removed and stored the arrow for eventual reinstallation at the site of a new museum.

=== County established ===
The Texas Legislature established Yoakum County from Bexar County in 1876. The county was organized in 1907, and Plains became the county seat. In 1900, the area had only 26 residents. One ranch in the county that year was devoted to cattle, rather than crops.

Sale of state land after 1900 brought an increase in population. By 1910, 107 farms or ranches were in the area, and the population had increased to 602.

By 1920, 109 ranches or farms in the area, but the population had fallen to 504. More than 21,000 cattle were reported that year, but crop cultivation remained limited; about 2,200 acres (8.9 km^{2}) were planted in corn, 600 in sorghum, and 47 in cotton. During the 1920s, the county experienced a minor expansion of crop farming, and cotton became the most important crop; by 1930, over 10,000 acres (40 km^{2}) were devoted to cotton. There were 239 farms, and the population had increased to 1,263.

The first oil well in the county gushed in 1935. Denver City benefited with a resulting boom economy. By January 1, 1991, almost 1,664,036,000 barrels (264,560,600 m^{3}) of oil had been taken from county lands since 1936.

Irrigation in the county led to more acres being planted on sorghum, cotton, alfalfa, watermelons, and castor beans. In 1982, 93% of the land in Yoakum County was in farms and ranches, and 44% of the farmland was under cultivation. Some 110,000 acres (450 km^{2}) were irrigated. About 95% of agricultural revenue was derived from crops, especially cotton, sorghum, wheat, hay, and corn.

== Geography ==
According to the U.S. Census Bureau, the county has a total area of 800 square miles (2,100 km^{2}), virtually all of which is land.

=== Major highways ===
- U.S. Highway 82
- U.S. Highway 380
- State Highway 83
- State Highway 214

=== Adjacent counties ===
- Cochran County (north)
- Terry County (east)
- Gaines County (south)
- Lea County, New Mexico (west/Mountain Time Zone)

== Demographics ==
Historical population
Census	Pop.	Note	%±
1890	4		—
1900	26		550.0%
1910	602		2,215.4%
1920	504		−16.3%
1930	1,263		150.6%
1940	5,354		323.9%
1950	4,339		−19.0%
1960	8,032		85.1%
1970	7,344		−8.6%
1980	8,299		13.0%
1990	8,786		5.9%
2000	7,322		−16.7%
2010	7,879		7.6%
2020	7,694		−2.3%
2025 (est.)	7,438	▼	−3.3%
U.S. Decennial Census; 1850–2010 2010 2020

=== Racial and ethnic composition ===
Yoakum County, Texas – Racial and ethnic composition Note: the US Census treats Hispanic/Latino as an ethnic category. This table excludes Latinos from the racial categories and assigns them to a separate category. Hispanics/Latinos may be of any race.
Race / Ethnicity (NH = Non-Hispanic)	Pop 2000	Pop 2010	Pop 2020	% 2000	% 2010	% 2020
White alone (NH)	3,793	3,090	2,488	51.80%	39.22%	32.34%
Black or African American alone (NH)	92	55	55	1.26%	0.70%	0.71%
Native American or Alaska Native alone (NH)	37	30	22	0.51%	0.38%	0.29%
Asian alone (NH)	9	26	46	0.12%	0.33%	0.60%
Pacific Islander alone (NH)	1	1	0	0.01%	0.01%	0.00%
Other race alone (NH)	2	5	15	0.03%	0.06%	0.19%
Mixed race or Multiracial (NH)	25	50	100	0.34%	0.63%	1.30%
Hispanic or Latino (any race)	3,363	4,622	4,968	45.93%	58.66%	64.57%
Total	7,322	7,879	7,694	100.00%	100.00%	100.00%

=== 2020 census ===
As of the 2020 census, the county had a population of 7,694. The median age was 35.0 years; 28.9% of the residents were under 18 and 14.3% were 65 or older. For every 100 females, there were 98.1 males, and for every 100 females 18 and over, there were 96.7 males 18 and over.

The racial makeup of the county was 48.8% White, 0.8% Black or African American, 0.8% American Indian and Alaska Native, 0.6% Asian, <0.1% Native Hawaiian and Pacific Islander, 25.5% from some other race, and 23.4% from two or more races. Hispanic or Latino residents of any race comprised 64.6% of the population.

Less than 0.1% of theresidents lived in urban areas, while almost all lived in rural areas.

Of the 2,655 households in the county, including 1,985 families, 43.4% had children under 18 living in them, 59.2% were married-couple households, 15.9% were households with a male householder and no spouse or partner present, and 20.2% were households with a female householder and no spouse or partner present. About 18.7% of all households were made up of individuals, and 9.2% had someone living alone who was 65 or older. The county had 3,009 housing units, of which 11.8% were vacant. Among occupied housing units, 75.6% were owner-occupied and 24.4% were renter-occupied. The homeowner vacancy rate was 1.2%, and the rental vacancy rate was 13.8%.

=== 2000 census ===
As of the census of 2000, 7,322 people, 2,469 households, and 2,007 families resided in the county. The population density was 9 people per square mile (3.5 people/km^{2}). The 2,974 housing units averaged 4 units per square mile (1.5 units/km^{2}). The racial makeup of the county was 70.62% White, 1.39% African American, 0.71% Native American, 0.12% Asian, 0.01% Pacific Islander, 25.48% from other races, and 1.65% from two or more races. About 45.93% of the population was Hispanic or Latino of any race.

Of the 2,469 households, 43.40% had children under the age of 18 living with them, 68.80% were married couples living together, 8.50% had a female householder with no husband present, and 18.70% were not families. About 17.30% of all households were made up of individuals, and 8.50% had someone living alone who was 65 years of age or older. The average household size was 2.95 and the average family size was 3.34.

In the county, the population was distributed as 32.10% under the age of 18, 8.30% from 18 to 24, 26.80% from 25 to 44, 21.30% from 45 to 64, and 11.50% who were 65 years of age or older. The median age was 34 years. For every 100 females there were 94.50 males. For every 100 females age 18 and over, there were 91.40 males.

The median income for a household in the county was $32,672, and for a family was $36,772. Males had a median income of $32,188 versus $19,913 for females. The per capita income for the county was $14,504. About 17.60% of families and 19.60% of the population were below the poverty line, including 24.00% of those under age 18 and 13.00% of those age 65 or over.

== Communities ==
=== Towns ===
- Denver City (small part in Gaines County)
- Plains (county seat)

=== Unincorporated community ===
- Allred

== Politics ==
Yoakum County is located within District 88 of the Texas House of Representatives. Yoakum County is located within District 31 of the Texas Senate.

United States presidential election results for Yoakum County, Texas
Year	Republican		Democratic		Third party(ies)	
Year	No.	%	No.	%	No.	%
1912	0	0.00%	40	81.63%	9	18.37%
1916	1	1.15%	85	97.70%	1	1.15%
1920	0	0.00%	79	97.53%	2	2.47%
1924	9	8.04%	95	84.82%	8	7.14%
1928	86	56.58%	66	43.42%	0	0.00%
1932	11	4.28%	245	95.33%	1	0.39%
1936	13	5.31%	227	92.65%	5	2.04%
1940	134	13.15%	885	86.85%	0	0.00%
1944	106	12.63%	646	77.00%	87	10.37%
1948	119	11.67%	861	84.41%	40	3.92%
1952	858	49.51%	873	50.38%	2	0.12%
1956	923	48.20%	989	51.64%	3	0.16%
1960	1,207	54.49%	994	44.88%	14	0.63%
1964	859	37.68%	1,415	62.06%	6	0.26%
1968	1,123	45.61%	615	24.98%	724	29.41%
1972	1,952	79.90%	457	18.71%	34	1.39%
1976	1,477	55.11%	1,181	44.07%	22	0.82%
1980	1,937	71.90%	715	26.54%	42	1.56%
1984	2,204	82.61%	456	17.09%	8	0.30%
1988	1,762	70.28%	727	29.00%	18	0.72%
1992	1,486	57.71%	595	23.11%	494	19.18%
1996	1,485	60.51%	738	30.07%	231	9.41%
2000	1,911	77.53%	531	21.54%	23	0.93%
2004	2,228	85.27%	376	14.39%	9	0.34%
2008	1,989	80.92%	450	18.31%	19	0.77%
2012	1,698	79.79%	409	19.22%	21	0.99%
2016	1,797	78.03%	426	18.50%	80	3.47%
2020	2,174	82.47%	420	15.93%	42	1.59%
2024	2,039	85.21%	342	14.29%	12	0.50%

United States Senate election results for Yoakum County, Texas1
Year	Republican		Democratic		Third party(ies)	
Year	No.	%	No.	%	No.	%
2024	1,928	82.36%	357	15.25%	56	2.39%

United States Senate election results for Yoakum County, Texas2
Year	Republican		Democratic		Third party(ies)	
Year	No.	%	No.	%	No.	%
2020	2,153	82.84%	387	14.89%	59	2.27%

Texas Gubernatorial election results for Yoakum County
Year	Republican		Democratic		Third party(ies)	
Year	No.	%	No.	%	No.	%
2022	1,427	87.22%	190	11.61%	19	1.16%

== Education ==
School districts serving the county include:

- Brownfield Independent School District
- Denver City Independent School District
- Plains Independent School District
- Seagraves Independent School District

The county is in the service area of South Plains College.

== See also ==
- Recorded Texas Historic Landmarks in Yoakum County
- Dry counties
