= 1964 United States presidential election in Texas =

- November 3, 1964
- Turnout: 44.6%

Nominee	Lyndon B. Johnson	Barry Goldwater
Party	Democratic	Republican
Home state	Texas	Arizona
Running mate	Hubert Humphrey	William E. Miller
Electoral vote	25	0
Popular vote	1,663,185	958,566
Percentage	63.32%	36.49%

Johnson
50–60%
60–70%
70–80%
80–90%
90–100%
Goldwater
50–60%
60–70%
President before election
Lyndon B. Johnson
Democratic
Elected President
Lyndon B. Johnson
Democratic

The 1964 United States presidential election in Texas was held on November 3, 1964, as part of the 1964 United States presidential election. The Democratic Party candidate, incumbent President Lyndon B. Johnson, comfortably won his home state of Texas with 63.32% of the vote against the Republican Party candidate, Senator Barry Goldwater of Arizona, who won 36.5%, giving him the state's 25 electoral votes and a victory margin of 26.8 percentage points. Johnson won the 1964 election in a landslide, carrying 44 states plus the District of Columbia, which participated for the first time. Goldwater only carried his home state of Arizona, along with five Deep South states which had been historically Democratic, but defected to the Republican Party due to the Democratic Party's support for civil rights. Due to its status as Johnson's home state, in 1964, Texas was the most Democratic of the 11 states of the former Confederacy and the only one which leaned more Democratic than the nation at-large.

This would be the last time the counties containing the five largest cities in Texas, consisting of Houston, San Antonio, Dallas, Austin, and Fort Worth, would vote Democratic at the same time until 2020.

== Results ==
1964 United States presidential election in Texas
Party	Candidate	Votes	Percentage	Electoral votes
Democratic	Lyndon B. Johnson (incumbent)	1,663,185	63.32%	25
Republican	Barry Goldwater	958,566	36.49%	0
Constitution	Joseph B. Lightburn	5,060	0.19%	0
Totals		2,626,811	100.00%	25
Voter turnout (voting age/registered voters)				44.6%/88.0%

=== Results by county ===
County	Lyndon B. Johnson Democratic		Barry Goldwater Republican		Joseph B. Lightburn Constitution		Margin		Total votes cast
County	#	%	#	%	#	%	#	%	Total votes cast
Anderson	4,809	58.78%	3,362	41.10%	10	0.12%	1,447	17.68%	8,181
Andrews	2,133	59.50%	1,442	40.22%	10	0.28%	691	19.28%	3,585
Angelina	8,194	60.77%	5,262	39.02%	28	0.21%	2,932	21.75%	13,484
Aransas	1,492	71.01%	602	28.65%	7	0.33%	890	42.36%	2,101
Archer	1,766	80.02%	441	19.98%	0	0.00%	1,325	60.04%	2,207
Armstrong	544	59.85%	365	40.15%	0	0.00%	179	19.70%	909
Atascosa	3,224	71.39%	1,283	28.41%	9	0.20%	1,941	42.98%	4,516
Austin	2,365	60.41%	1,545	39.46%	5	0.13%	820	20.95%	3,915
Bailey	1,503	58.67%	1,056	41.22%	3	0.12%	447	17.45%	2,562
Bandera	876	53.45%	762	46.49%	1	0.06%	114	6.96%	1,639
Bastrop	3,912	77.48%	1,130	22.38%	7	0.14%	2,782	55.10%	5,049
Baylor	1,403	78.21%	389	21.68%	2	0.11%	1,014	56.53%	1,794
Bee	3,314	68.58%	1,509	31.23%	9	0.19%	1,805	37.35%	4,832
Bell	14,557	83.13%	2,938	16.78%	17	0.10%	11,619	66.35%	17,512
Bexar	108,658	66.86%	53,469	32.90%	393	0.24%	55,189	33.96%	162,520
Blanco	1,197	80.44%	290	19.49%	1	0.07%	907	60.95%	1,488
Borden	266	63.48%	152	36.28%	1	0.24%	114	27.20%	419
Bosque	2,690	72.29%	1,024	27.52%	7	0.19%	1,666	44.77%	3,721
Bowie	10,368	59.55%	7,018	40.31%	24	0.14%	3,350	19.24%	17,410
Brazoria	15,917	64.98%	8,477	34.60%	103	0.42%	7,440	30.38%	24,497
Brazos	7,998	66.54%	4,003	33.31%	18	0.15%	3,995	33.23%	12,019
Brewster	1,251	66.30%	635	33.65%	1	0.05%	616	32.65%	1,887
Briscoe	966	73.35%	348	26.42%	3	0.23%	618	46.93%	1,317
Brooks	2,299	85.05%	402	14.87%	2	0.07%	1,897	70.18%	2,703
Brown	5,214	71.49%	2,070	28.38%	9	0.12%	3,144	43.11%	7,293
Burleson	2,527	80.30%	617	19.61%	3	0.10%	1,910	60.69%	3,147
Burnet	2,585	75.81%	821	24.08%	4	0.12%	1,764	51.73%	3,410
Caldwell	3,580	77.34%	1,046	22.60%	3	0.06%	2,534	54.74%	4,629
Calhoun	3,398	76.64%	1,031	23.25%	5	0.11%	2,367	53.39%	4,434
Callahan	2,178	71.72%	849	27.96%	10	0.33%	1,329	43.76%	3,037
Cameron	16,056	62.57%	9,531	37.14%	72	0.28%	6,525	25.43%	25,659
Camp	1,841	71.44%	729	28.29%	7	0.27%	1,112	43.15%	2,577
Carson	1,574	60.05%	1,044	39.83%	3	0.11%	530	20.22%	2,621
Cass	3,603	57.26%	2,681	42.61%	8	0.13%	922	14.65%	6,292
Castro	1,865	74.78%	626	25.10%	3	0.12%	1,239	49.68%	2,494
Chambers	1,921	64.99%	1,023	34.61%	12	0.41%	898	30.38%	2,956
Cherokee	5,485	64.25%	3,043	35.64%	9	0.11%	2,442	28.61%	8,537
Childress	1,977	67.45%	952	32.48%	2	0.07%	1,025	34.97%	2,931
Clay	2,357	78.05%	659	21.82%	4	0.13%	1,698	56.23%	3,020
Cochran	1,260	71.55%	497	28.22%	4	0.23%	763	43.33%	1,761
Coke	900	70.92%	366	28.84%	3	0.24%	534	42.08%	1,269
Coleman	2,670	65.04%	1,434	34.93%	1	0.02%	1,236	30.11%	4,105
Collin	7,833	69.98%	3,341	29.85%	19	0.17%	4,492	40.13%	11,193
Collingsworth	1,145	61.16%	724	38.68%	3	0.16%	421	22.48%	1,872
Colorado	3,650	65.48%	1,918	34.41%	6	0.11%	1,732	31.07%	5,574
Comal	3,644	62.03%	2,223	37.84%	8	0.14%	1,421	24.19%	5,875
Comanche	2,851	74.65%	962	25.19%	6	0.16%	1,889	49.46%	3,819
Concho	948	75.48%	307	24.44%	1	0.08%	641	51.04%	1,256
Cooke	4,083	56.62%	3,117	43.23%	11	0.15%	966	13.39%	7,211
Coryell	3,679	80.61%	877	19.22%	8	0.18%	2,802	61.39%	4,564
Cottle	1,122	82.93%	230	17.00%	1	0.07%	892	65.93%	1,353
Crane	919	58.95%	637	40.86%	3	0.19%	282	18.09%	1,559
Crockett	799	65.98%	409	33.77%	3	0.25%	390	32.21%	1,211
Crosby	2,278	78.77%	611	21.13%	3	0.10%	1,667	57.64%	2,892
Culberson	473	60.10%	314	39.90%	0	0.00%	159	20.20%	787
Dallam	1,058	60.15%	700	39.80%	1	0.06%	358	20.35%	1,759
Dallas	166,472	54.73%	137,065	45.06%	621	0.20%	29,407	9.67%	304,158
Dawson	3,171	65.14%	1,691	34.74%	6	0.12%	1,480	30.40%	4,868
Deaf Smith	2,094	53.73%	1,793	46.01%	10	0.26%	301	7.72%	3,897
Delta	1,619	82.60%	339	17.30%	2	0.10%	1,280	65.30%	1,960
Denton	9,137	67.71%	4,335	32.13%	22	0.16%	4,802	35.58%	13,494
DeWitt	3,286	58.96%	2,283	40.97%	4	0.07%	1,003	17.99%	5,573
Dickens	1,324	79.42%	339	20.34%	4	0.24%	985	59.08%	1,667
Dimmit	1,184	70.14%	501	29.68%	3	0.18%	683	40.46%	1,688
Donley	1,068	60.14%	708	39.86%	0	0.00%	360	20.28%	1,776
Duval	4,432	92.55%	353	7.37%	4	0.08%	4,079	85.18%	4,789
Eastland	4,692	69.49%	2,049	30.35%	11	0.16%	2,643	39.14%	6,752
Ector	10,826	48.36%	11,497	51.36%	63	0.28%	−671	−3.00%	22,386
Edwards	337	47.33%	371	52.11%	4	0.56%	−34	−4.78%	712
Ellis	7,278	72.33%	2,779	27.62%	5	0.05%	4,499	44.71%	10,062
El Paso	35,050	62.67%	20,687	36.99%	190	0.34%	14,363	25.68%	55,927
Erath	3,851	70.04%	1,642	29.87%	5	0.09%	2,209	40.17%	5,498
Falls	3,933	76.35%	1,216	23.61%	2	0.04%	2,717	52.74%	5,151
Fannin	5,976	83.00%	1,219	16.93%	5	0.07%	4,757	66.07%	7,200
Fayette	3,630	63.94%	2,036	35.86%	11	0.19%	1,594	28.08%	5,677
Fisher	2,108	82.12%	454	17.69%	5	0.19%	1,654	64.43%	2,567
Floyd	2,383	65.81%	1,229	33.94%	9	0.25%	1,154	31.87%	3,621
Foard	833	85.00%	146	14.90%	1	0.10%	687	70.10%	980
Fort Bend	6,186	63.78%	3,493	36.01%	20	0.21%	2,693	27.77%	9,699
Franklin	1,520	78.19%	424	21.81%	0	0.00%	1,096	56.38%	1,944
Freestone	2,816	72.35%	1,074	27.60%	2	0.05%	1,742	44.75%	3,892
Frio	1,507	71.19%	607	28.67%	3	0.14%	900	42.52%	2,117
Gaines	2,045	63.89%	1,153	36.02%	3	0.09%	892	27.87%	3,201
Galveston	30,672	71.04%	12,365	28.64%	136	0.32%	18,307	42.40%	43,173
Garza	1,254	68.64%	567	31.03%	6	0.33%	687	37.61%	1,827
Gillespie	2,264	57.17%	1,695	42.80%	1	0.03%	569	14.37%	3,960
Glasscock	179	49.31%	183	50.41%	1	0.28%	−4	−1.10%	363
Goliad	990	64.24%	549	35.63%	2	0.13%	441	28.61%	1,541
Gonzales	3,348	73.66%	1,190	26.18%	7	0.15%	2,158	47.48%	4,545
Gray	3,633	42.00%	5,011	57.93%	6	0.07%	−1,378	−15.93%	8,650
Grayson	14,207	72.01%	5,500	27.88%	21	0.11%	8,707	44.13%	19,728
Gregg	8,741	42.47%	11,761	57.14%	82	0.40%	−3,020	−14.67%	20,584
Grimes	2,229	68.65%	1,014	31.23%	4	0.12%	1,215	37.42%	3,247
Guadalupe	4,568	62.51%	2,731	37.37%	9	0.12%	1,837	25.14%	7,308
Hale	5,910	61.60%	3,666	38.21%	18	0.19%	2,244	23.39%	9,594
Hall	1,785	72.77%	667	27.19%	1	0.04%	1,118	45.58%	2,453
Hamilton	2,048	67.02%	1,006	32.92%	2	0.07%	1,042	34.10%	3,056
Hansford	860	41.83%	1,193	58.03%	3	0.15%	−333	−16.20%	2,056
Hardeman	1,835	72.47%	697	27.53%	0	0.00%	1,138	44.94%	2,532
Hardin	5,143	71.97%	1,987	27.81%	16	0.22%	3,156	44.16%	7,146
Harris	227,819	59.49%	154,401	40.32%	765	0.20%	73,418	19.17%	382,985
Harrison	6,351	53.24%	5,568	46.67%	11	0.09%	783	6.57%	11,930
Hartley	565	56.33%	437	43.57%	1	0.10%	128	12.76%	1,003
Haskell	2,903	84.86%	512	14.97%	6	0.18%	2,391	69.89%	3,421
Hays	3,780	74.64%	1,279	25.26%	5	0.10%	2,501	49.38%	5,064
Hemphill	649	53.50%	563	46.41%	1	0.08%	86	7.09%	1,213
Henderson	4,697	69.96%	1,988	29.61%	29	0.43%	2,709	40.35%	6,714
Hidalgo	22,110	65.50%	11,563	34.25%	83	0.25%	10,547	31.25%	33,756
Hill	5,130	76.61%	1,557	23.25%	9	0.13%	3,573	53.36%	6,696
Hockley	4,049	70.63%	1,674	29.20%	10	0.17%	2,375	41.43%	5,733
Hood	1,661	79.59%	423	20.27%	3	0.14%	1,238	59.32%	2,087
Hopkins	4,133	73.14%	1,518	26.86%	0	0.00%	2,615	46.28%	5,651
Houston	3,681	68.60%	1,675	31.22%	10	0.19%	2,006	37.38%	5,366
Howard	6,083	64.94%	3,272	34.93%	12	0.13%	2,811	30.01%	9,367
Hudspeth	438	65.86%	224	33.68%	3	0.45%	214	32.18%	665
Hunt	6,567	66.47%	3,302	33.42%	10	0.10%	3,265	33.05%	9,879
Hutchinson	4,625	46.25%	5,358	53.58%	17	0.17%	−733	−7.33%	10,000
Irion	351	63.82%	199	36.18%	0	0.00%	152	27.64%	550
Jack	1,594	65.22%	847	34.66%	3	0.12%	747	30.56%	2,444
Jackson	2,775	70.22%	1,168	29.55%	9	0.23%	1,607	40.67%	3,952
Jasper	3,600	65.02%	1,919	34.66%	18	0.33%	1,681	30.36%	5,537
Jeff Davis	304	63.47%	174	36.33%	1	0.21%	130	27.14%	479
Jefferson	44,584	60.58%	28,771	39.09%	239	0.32%	15,813	21.49%	73,594
Jim Hogg	1,375	89.87%	152	9.93%	3	0.20%	1,223	79.94%	1,530
Jim Wells	6,849	77.50%	1,988	22.50%	0	0.00%	4,861	55.00%	8,837
Johnson	6,381	66.18%	3,251	33.72%	10	0.10%	3,130	32.46%	9,642
Jones	3,622	73.62%	1,295	26.32%	3	0.06%	2,327	47.30%	4,920
Karnes	3,178	76.08%	993	23.77%	6	0.14%	2,185	52.31%	4,177
Kaufman	4,766	71.20%	1,922	28.71%	6	0.09%	2,844	42.49%	6,694
Kendall	970	44.64%	1,200	55.22%	3	0.14%	−230	−10.58%	2,173
Kenedy	115	78.77%	30	20.55%	1	0.68%	85	58.22%	146
Kent	563	83.04%	115	16.96%	0	0.00%	448	66.08%	678
Kerr	2,894	51.60%	2,706	48.25%	8	0.14%	188	3.35%	5,608
Kimble	862	62.33%	520	37.60%	1	0.07%	342	24.73%	1,383
King	180	84.11%	34	15.89%	0	0.00%	146	68.22%	214
Kinney	439	73.91%	155	26.09%	0	0.00%	284	47.82%	594
Kleberg	4,568	73.32%	1,652	26.52%	10	0.16%	2,916	46.80%	6,230
Knox	1,773	80.01%	439	19.81%	4	0.18%	1,334	60.20%	2,216
Lamar	6,303	70.78%	2,594	29.13%	8	0.09%	3,709	41.65%	8,905
Lamb	4,318	68.01%	2,022	31.85%	9	0.14%	2,296	36.16%	6,349
Lampasas	2,224	74.88%	744	25.05%	2	0.07%	1,480	49.83%	2,970
La Salle	988	81.52%	223	18.40%	1	0.08%	765	63.12%	1,212
Lavaca	4,031	73.07%	1,480	26.83%	6	0.11%	2,551	46.24%	5,517
Lee	1,884	67.07%	923	32.86%	2	0.07%	961	34.21%	2,809
Leon	2,373	78.52%	642	21.24%	7	0.23%	1,731	57.28%	3,022
Liberty	5,357	64.88%	2,884	34.93%	16	0.19%	2,473	29.95%	8,257
Limestone	3,777	71.77%	1,478	28.08%	8	0.15%	2,299	43.69%	5,263
Lipscomb	589	43.57%	763	56.43%	0	0.00%	−174	−12.86%	1,352
Live Oak	1,423	63.93%	795	35.71%	8	0.36%	628	28.22%	2,226
Llano	1,727	72.44%	655	27.47%	2	0.08%	1,072	44.97%	2,384
Loving	46	58.23%	32	40.51%	1	1.27%	14	17.72%	79
Lubbock	22,057	55.89%	17,372	44.02%	34	0.09%	4,685	11.87%	39,463
Lynn	2,281	75.28%	745	24.59%	4	0.13%	1,536	50.69%	3,030
McCulloch	2,100	76.06%	655	23.72%	6	0.22%	1,445	52.34%	2,761
McLennan	28,429	72.25%	10,892	27.68%	25	0.06%	17,537	44.57%	39,346
McMullen	267	60.27%	175	39.50%	1	0.23%	92	20.77%	443
Madison	1,298	66.74%	644	33.11%	3	0.15%	654	33.63%	1,945
Marion	1,372	59.57%	927	40.25%	4	0.17%	445	19.32%	2,303
Martin	892	68.77%	402	30.99%	3	0.23%	490	37.78%	1,297
Mason	941	61.30%	590	38.44%	4	0.26%	351	22.86%	1,535
Matagorda	4,143	63.20%	2,407	36.72%	5	0.08%	1,736	26.48%	6,555
Maverick	2,113	79.41%	545	20.48%	3	0.11%	1,568	58.93%	2,661
Medina	3,408	68.27%	1,583	31.71%	1	0.02%	1,825	36.56%	4,992
Menard	588	59.70%	397	40.30%	0	0.00%	191	19.40%	985
Midland	8,646	41.96%	11,906	57.78%	53	0.26%	−3,260	−15.82%	20,605
Milam	4,368	76.51%	1,334	23.37%	7	0.12%	3,034	53.14%	5,709
Mills	1,228	71.27%	495	28.73%	0	0.00%	733	42.54%	1,723
Mitchell	2,420	76.61%	737	23.33%	2	0.06%	1,683	53.28%	3,159
Montague	3,746	77.14%	1,106	22.78%	4	0.08%	2,640	54.36%	4,856
Montgomery	4,989	60.87%	3,167	38.64%	40	0.49%	1,822	22.23%	8,196
Moore	2,393	57.54%	1,762	42.37%	4	0.10%	631	15.17%	4,159
Morris	2,366	65.83%	1,218	33.89%	10	0.28%	1,148	31.94%	3,594
Motley	678	67.53%	324	32.27%	2	0.20%	354	35.26%	1,004
Nacogdoches	4,524	60.17%	2,976	39.58%	19	0.25%	1,548	20.59%	7,519
Navarro	6,811	76.08%	2,139	23.89%	3	0.03%	4,672	52.19%	8,953
Newton	2,211	74.82%	738	24.97%	6	0.20%	1,473	49.85%	2,955
Nolan	3,540	68.58%	1,610	31.19%	12	0.23%	1,930	37.39%	5,162
Nueces	40,426	74.10%	14,048	25.75%	84	0.15%	26,378	48.35%	54,558
Ochiltree	920	33.61%	1,814	66.28%	3	0.11%	−894	−32.67%	2,737
Oldham	397	59.25%	269	40.15%	4	0.60%	128	19.10%	670
Orange	9,390	60.02%	6,216	39.73%	39	0.25%	3,174	20.29%	15,645
Palo Pinto	3,791	68.42%	1,748	31.55%	2	0.04%	2,043	36.87%	5,541
Panola	2,608	47.97%	2,818	51.83%	11	0.20%	−210	−3.86%	5,437
Parker	5,270	70.66%	2,175	29.16%	13	0.17%	3,095	41.50%	7,458
Parmer	1,556	55.99%	1,216	43.76%	7	0.25%	340	12.23%	2,779
Pecos	2,068	59.55%	1,393	40.11%	12	0.35%	675	19.44%	3,473
Polk	2,492	67.35%	1,199	32.41%	9	0.24%	1,293	34.94%	3,700
Potter	12,850	52.62%	11,505	47.11%	64	0.26%	1,345	5.51%	24,419
Presidio	1,156	72.80%	431	27.14%	1	0.06%	725	45.66%	1,588
Rains	893	76.46%	272	23.29%	3	0.26%	621	53.17%	1,168
Randall	6,016	43.34%	7,843	56.50%	22	0.16%	−1,827	−13.16%	13,881
Reagan	614	60.08%	406	39.73%	2	0.20%	208	20.35%	1,022
Real	487	65.55%	255	34.32%	1	0.13%	232	31.23%	743
Red River	3,391	72.86%	1,257	27.01%	6	0.13%	2,134	45.85%	4,654
Reeves	2,340	65.09%	1,251	34.80%	4	0.11%	1,089	30.29%	3,595
Refugio	2,319	75.02%	772	24.98%	0	0.00%	1,547	50.04%	3,091
Roberts	198	40.00%	297	60.00%	0	0.00%	−99	−20.00%	495
Robertson	3,350	78.88%	895	21.07%	2	0.05%	2,455	57.81%	4,247
Rockwall	1,305	74.36%	445	25.36%	5	0.28%	860	49.00%	1,755
Runnels	2,645	64.01%	1,480	35.82%	7	0.17%	1,165	28.19%	4,132
Rusk	6,528	54.25%	5,488	45.61%	17	0.14%	1,040	8.64%	12,033
Sabine	1,801	80.76%	428	19.19%	1	0.04%	1,373	61.57%	2,230
San Augustine	1,173	60.46%	760	39.18%	7	0.36%	413	21.28%	1,940
San Jacinto	1,680	82.92%	343	16.93%	3	0.15%	1,337	65.99%	2,026
San Patricio	7,176	76.47%	2,188	23.32%	20	0.21%	4,988	53.15%	9,384
San Saba	1,859	81.64%	418	18.36%	0	0.00%	1,441	63.28%	2,277
Schleicher	514	56.92%	388	42.97%	1	0.11%	126	13.95%	903
Scurry	3,381	65.82%	1,741	33.89%	15	0.29%	1,640	31.93%	5,137
Shackelford	934	65.59%	487	34.20%	3	0.21%	447	31.39%	1,424
Shelby	3,487	61.06%	2,220	38.87%	4	0.07%	1,267	22.19%	5,711
Sherman	462	42.31%	629	57.60%	1	0.09%	−167	−15.29%	1,092
Smith	12,474	48.97%	12,960	50.88%	38	0.15%	−486	−1.91%	25,472
Somervell	641	75.06%	210	24.59%	3	0.35%	431	50.47%	854
Starr	4,056	85.53%	678	14.30%	8	0.17%	3,378	71.23%	4,742
Stephens	1,753	61.00%	1,119	38.94%	2	0.07%	634	22.06%	2,874
Sterling	243	63.28%	140	36.46%	1	0.26%	103	26.82%	384
Stonewall	978	81.57%	219	18.27%	2	0.17%	759	63.30%	1,199
Sutton	694	66.03%	357	33.97%	0	0.00%	337	32.06%	1,051
Swisher	2,410	74.61%	815	25.23%	5	0.15%	1,595	49.38%	3,230
Tarrant	97,092	62.98%	56,593	36.71%	473	0.31%	40,499	26.27%	154,158
Taylor	13,366	59.09%	9,220	40.76%	34	0.15%	4,146	18.33%	22,620
Terrell	364	55.32%	294	44.68%	0	0.00%	70	10.64%	658
Terry	3,034	65.50%	1,592	34.37%	6	0.13%	1,442	31.13%	4,632
Throckmorton	883	78.14%	247	21.86%	0	0.00%	636	56.28%	1,130
Titus	3,528	67.60%	1,687	32.32%	4	0.08%	1,841	35.28%	5,219
Tom Green	9,767	59.40%	6,664	40.53%	12	0.07%	3,103	18.87%	16,443
Travis	44,058	68.89%	19,838	31.02%	62	0.10%	24,220	37.87%	63,958
Trinity	1,654	68.12%	763	31.43%	11	0.45%	891	36.69%	2,428
Tyler	1,818	59.86%	1,216	40.04%	3	0.10%	602	19.82%	3,037
Upshur	4,027	64.31%	2,222	35.48%	13	0.21%	1,805	28.83%	6,262
Upton	958	59.73%	636	39.65%	10	0.62%	322	20.08%	1,604
Uvalde	2,358	54.51%	1,963	45.38%	5	0.12%	395	9.13%	4,326
Val Verde	3,555	72.52%	1,346	27.46%	1	0.02%	2,209	45.06%	4,902
Van Zandt	4,047	71.30%	1,614	28.44%	15	0.26%	2,433	42.86%	5,676
Victoria	8,141	65.83%	4,201	33.97%	25	0.20%	3,940	31.86%	12,367
Walker	2,877	64.86%	1,557	35.10%	2	0.05%	1,320	29.76%	4,436
Waller	2,167	68.82%	980	31.12%	2	0.06%	1,187	37.70%	3,149
Ward	2,221	56.17%	1,730	43.75%	3	0.08%	491	12.42%	3,954
Washington	2,938	59.21%	2,019	40.69%	5	0.10%	919	18.52%	4,962
Webb	10,073	90.08%	1,094	9.78%	15	0.13%	8,979	80.30%	11,182
Wharton	6,234	69.11%	2,775	30.76%	11	0.12%	3,459	38.35%	9,020
Wheeler	1,440	55.81%	1,138	44.11%	2	0.08%	302	11.70%	2,580
Wichita	19,131	68.99%	8,585	30.96%	14	0.05%	10,546	38.03%	27,730
Wilbarger	3,200	67.48%	1,539	32.45%	3	0.06%	1,661	35.03%	4,742
Willacy	2,152	63.52%	1,230	36.30%	6	0.18%	922	27.22%	3,388
Williamson	7,430	80.74%	1,766	19.19%	6	0.07%	5,664	61.55%	9,202
Wilson	3,472	82.77%	718	17.12%	5	0.12%	2,754	65.65%	4,195
Winkler	2,059	55.97%	1,617	43.95%	3	0.08%	442	12.02%	3,679
Wise	3,852	73.50%	1,386	26.45%	3	0.06%	2,466	47.05%	5,241
Wood	3,528	62.93%	2,068	36.89%	10	0.18%	1,460	26.04%	5,606
Yoakum	1,415	62.06%	859	37.68%	6	0.26%	556	24.38%	2,280
Young	3,395	67.95%	1,600	32.03%	1	0.02%	1,795	35.92%	4,996
Zapata	1,009	87.97%	135	11.77%	3	0.26%	874	76.20%	1,147
Zavala	1,784	74.80%	598	25.07%	3	0.13%	1,186	49.73%	2,385
Totals	1,663,185	63.32%	958,566	36.49%	5,060	0.19%	704,619	26.83%	2,626,811

==== Counties that flipped from Democratic to Republican ====
- Glasscock

==== Counties that flipped from Republican to Democratic ====
- Anderson
- Armstrong
- Austin
- Bailey
- Bandera
- Brazoria
- Brewster
- Childress
- Carson
- Coleman
- Collingsworth
- Comal
- Cooke
- Crockett
- Dallam
- Dallas
- Dawson
- Denton
- Deaf Smith
- DeWitt
- Donley
- Eastland
- Erath
- Floyd
- Fort Bend
- Gaines
- Gillespie
- Goliad
- Guadalupe
- Hale
- Hamilton
- Hardeman
- Harris
- Hartley
- Hemphill
- Jack
- Jackson
- Kerr
- Kimble
- Live Oak
- Lubbock
- McMullen
- Menard
- Mason
- Matagorda
- Mills
- Moore
- Motley
- Oldham
- Parmer
- Potter
- Real
- Runnels
- Rusk
- Schleicher
- Stephens
- Somervell
- Tarrant
- Taylor
- Tom Green
- Tyler
- Uvalde
- Waller
- Wilbarger
- Washington
- Wheeler
- Wise
- Yoakum
- Zavala

== Analysis ==
The home state of President Lyndon B. Johnson, Texas was easily his best state in the former Confederacy, although he did better still in four of the five border states. Overall Texas was Johnson's nineteenth best state in the election and weighed in at 4.25% points more Democratic than the national average. Johnson won every region in the state by wide margins, including those which had begun trending Republican in recent presidential elections such as the Texas Panhandle, the Dallas–Fort Worth metroplex, and Metro Houston. Every major city in the state voted for Johnson, including every mid-sized city with the exceptions of Odessa, Midland, Tyler, and Longview, which were won by Goldwater.

Two counties in the northern Panhandle, Ochiltree and Roberts, gave Goldwater over sixty percent of the vote, further reflecting this region's trend towards the Republican Party. Given that it was also Johnson's home county, Gillespie County in the Texas Hill Country voted Democratic for the only time since Franklin D. Roosevelt’s landslide in the 1932 election, in which he carried every county. This is the only presidential election between 1952 and 2008 that Dallas and Harris counties voted for the Democratic candidate. Dallas in particular likely swung towards Johnson due to the city still being in mourning from the assassination of President John F. Kennedy, which had occurred less than a year before the election. Despite this strong swing, Johnson only carried Dallas County by a 9.6% margin.

President Johnson carried 238 out of the state's 254 counties, and all twenty-three congressional districts. The 1964 election marks the last time a Democratic candidate for president won Texas with over sixty percent of the vote, won the state with a double-digit margin, and carried any counties with over ninety percent of the vote (in this case, the South Texas counties of Duval and Webb). Webb, Duval and Jim Hogg counties stood among the four most Democratic in the nation.

Aside from Johnson's home county Gillespie as mentioned above, this remains the last election as of the 2024 presidential election in which the counties of Andrews, Austin, Bandera, Brazos, Collin, Comal, Cooke, Crane, Dawson, Deaf Smith, Denton, DeWitt, Guadalupe, Hartley, Hemphill, Irion, Kerr, Kimble, Loving, Lubbock, McMullen, Montgomery, Potter, Reagan, Runnels, Rusk, Schleicher, Sterling, Sutton, Taylor, Tom Green, Upton, Uvalde, Victoria, Washington, Winkler, and Yoakum voted for the Democratic presidential candidate. Dallas County and Harris County, the two most populous in the state, would not vote Democratic again until Barack Obama won them in 2008; Fort Bend County, a Houston suburb, would not vote Democratic again until Hillary Clinton won it in 2016; and Tarrant County, the third most populous county and home to the long-conservative Fort Worth suburbs, would not vote Democratic again until Joe Biden won it in 2020. This is also the last time a Democratic candidate won every county in the Texas Triangle.

== See also ==
- United States presidential elections in Texas
