= Plains Independent School District =

School district in Texas

Plains Independent School District is a public school district based in Plains, Texas, United States.

The district has three campuses:

- Plains High School (grades 9-12)
- Plains Middle School (grades 5-8)
- Plains Elementary School (prekindergarten-grade 4)

In 2009, the school district was rated "recognized" by the Texas Education Agency.
