= Plains, Texas =

- Town
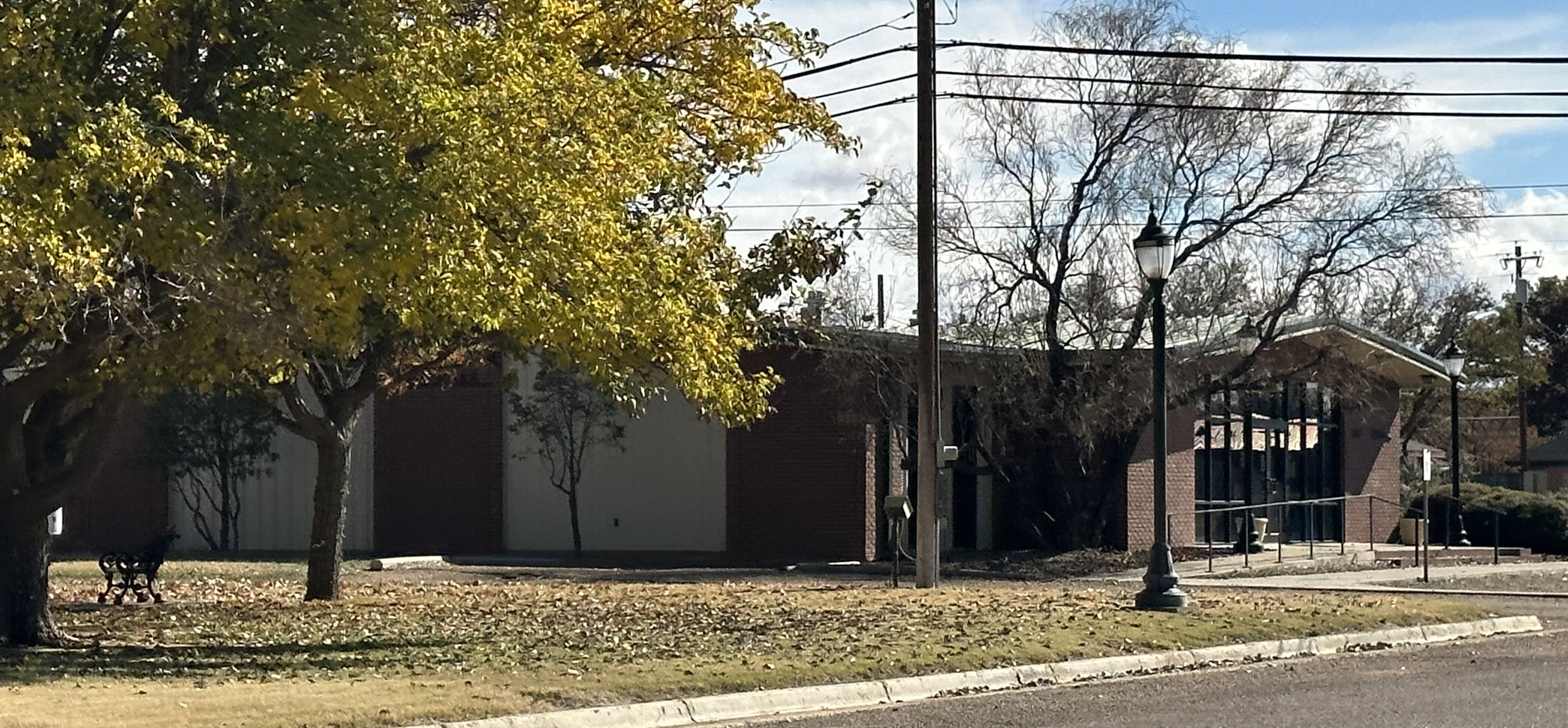
- Plains City Hall

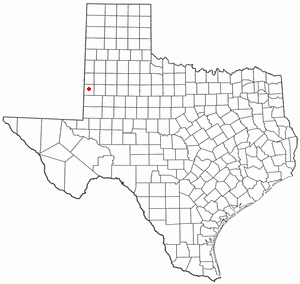
- Location of Plains, Texas

- Coordinates: 33°11′25″N 102°49′39″W
- Country: United States
- State: Texas
- County: Yoakum

Area
  - Total: 1.50 sq mi (3.88 km^{2})
  - Land: 1.50 sq mi (3.88 km^{2})
  - Water: 0 sq mi (0.00 km^{2})
- Elevation: 3,642 ft (1,110 m)

Population (2020)
  - Total: 1,355
  - Density: 900/sq mi (349/km^{2})
- Time zone: UTC-6 (Central (CST))
  - Summer (DST): UTC-5 (CDT)
- ZIP code: 79355
- Area code: 806
- FIPS code: 48-57968
- GNIS feature ID: 2413140
- Website: cityofplains.net

Plains is a town in and the county seat of Yoakum County of western Texas, United States. The city's population was 1,355 at the 2020 census. Yoakum County is in the Texas High Plains Wine country.

== History ==
In 1905, W. J. Luna founded and named Plains. When Yoakum County was organized in 1907, Plains was designated the county seat. Following the discovery of oil in 1936, the population has grown steadily.

== Geography ==
Plains is located at 33°11′25″N 102°49′39″W (33.190251, –102.827578).

According to the United States Census Bureau, the town has a total area of 1.0 square mile (2.6 km^{2}), all land.

Sulphur Springs Draw runs through town. The springs feeding the stream have dried up due to the extraction of underground water.

=== Climate ===
According to the Köppen climate classification system, Plains has a semiarid climate, BSk on climate maps.

Climate data for Plains, Texas (1991–2020 normals, extremes 1946–present)
| Month | Jan | Feb | Mar | Apr | May | Jun | Jul | Aug | Sep | Oct | Nov | Dec | Year |
|---|---|---|---|---|---|---|---|---|---|---|---|---|---|
| Record high °F (°C) | 82 (28) | 86 (30) | 99 (37) | 98 (37) | 107 (42) | 111 (44) | 109 (43) | 107 (42) | 104 (40) | 100 (38) | 88 (31) | 82 (28) | 111 (44) |
| Mean maximum °F (°C) | 74.4 (23.6) | 78.2 (25.7) | 84.8 (29.3) | 90.3 (32.4) | 97.7 (36.5) | 103.3 (39.6) | 102.3 (39.1) | 100.0 (37.8) | 97.0 (36.1) | 91.1 (32.8) | 80.6 (27.0) | 73.2 (22.9) | 105.5 (40.8) |
| Mean daily maximum °F (°C) | 54.3 (12.4) | 59.3 (15.2) | 67.3 (19.6) | 75.3 (24.1) | 83.7 (28.7) | 91.8 (33.2) | 92.5 (33.6) | 91.4 (33.0) | 84.3 (29.1) | 75.2 (24.0) | 63.3 (17.4) | 55.0 (12.8) | 74.5 (23.6) |
| Daily mean °F (°C) | 39.4 (4.1) | 43.7 (6.5) | 51.0 (10.6) | 58.7 (14.8) | 68.4 (20.2) | 76.9 (24.9) | 78.9 (26.1) | 77.8 (25.4) | 70.6 (21.4) | 60.1 (15.6) | 48.1 (8.9) | 40.5 (4.7) | 59.5 (15.3) |
| Mean daily minimum °F (°C) | 24.5 (−4.2) | 28.2 (−2.1) | 34.8 (1.6) | 42.1 (5.6) | 53.0 (11.7) | 62.1 (16.7) | 65.3 (18.5) | 64.2 (17.9) | 56.9 (13.8) | 45.0 (7.2) | 32.9 (0.5) | 25.9 (−3.4) | 44.6 (7.0) |
| Mean minimum °F (°C) | 13.0 (−10.6) | 16.2 (−8.8) | 21.3 (−5.9) | 29.6 (−1.3) | 40.4 (4.7) | 54.9 (12.7) | 60.1 (15.6) | 58.2 (14.6) | 45.9 (7.7) | 30.7 (−0.7) | 18.4 (−7.6) | 12.3 (−10.9) | 7.3 (−13.7) |
| Record low °F (°C) | −12 (−24) | −12 (−24) | 4 (−16) | 16 (−9) | 25 (−4) | 42 (6) | 50 (10) | 49 (9) | 34 (1) | 12 (−11) | −2 (−19) | −4 (−20) | −12 (−24) |
| Average precipitation inches (mm) | 0.52 (13) | 0.59 (15) | 1.04 (26) | 0.91 (23) | 1.56 (40) | 1.99 (51) | 2.10 (53) | 2.10 (53) | 2.48 (63) | 1.43 (36) | 0.70 (18) | 0.77 (20) | 16.19 (411) |
| Average snowfall inches (cm) | 0.5 (1.3) | 0.9 (2.3) | 0.0 (0.0) | 0.0 (0.0) | 0.0 (0.0) | 0.0 (0.0) | 0.0 (0.0) | 0.0 (0.0) | 0.0 (0.0) | 0.0 (0.0) | 0.2 (0.51) | 1.1 (2.8) | 2.7 (6.9) |
| Average precipitation days (≥ 0.01 in) | 2.0 | 2.6 | 3.1 | 2.6 | 4.4 | 4.5 | 4.8 | 5.5 | 5.3 | 4.1 | 2.4 | 2.8 | 44.1 |
| Average snowy days (≥ 0.1 in) | 0.3 | 0.5 | 0.0 | 0.0 | 0.0 | 0.0 | 0.0 | 0.0 | 0.0 | 0.0 | 0.3 | 0.7 | 1.8 |
Source: NOAA

== Demographics ==
Historical population
| Census | Pop. | Note | %± |
|---|---|---|---|
| 1960 | 1,195 | | — |
| 1970 | 1,087 | | −9.0% |
| 1980 | 1,457 | | 34.0% |
| 1990 | 1,422 | | −2.4% |
| 2000 | 1,450 | | 2.0% |
| 2010 | 1,481 | | 2.1% |
| 2020 | 1,355 | | −8.5% |
U.S. Decennial Census

=== 2020 census ===
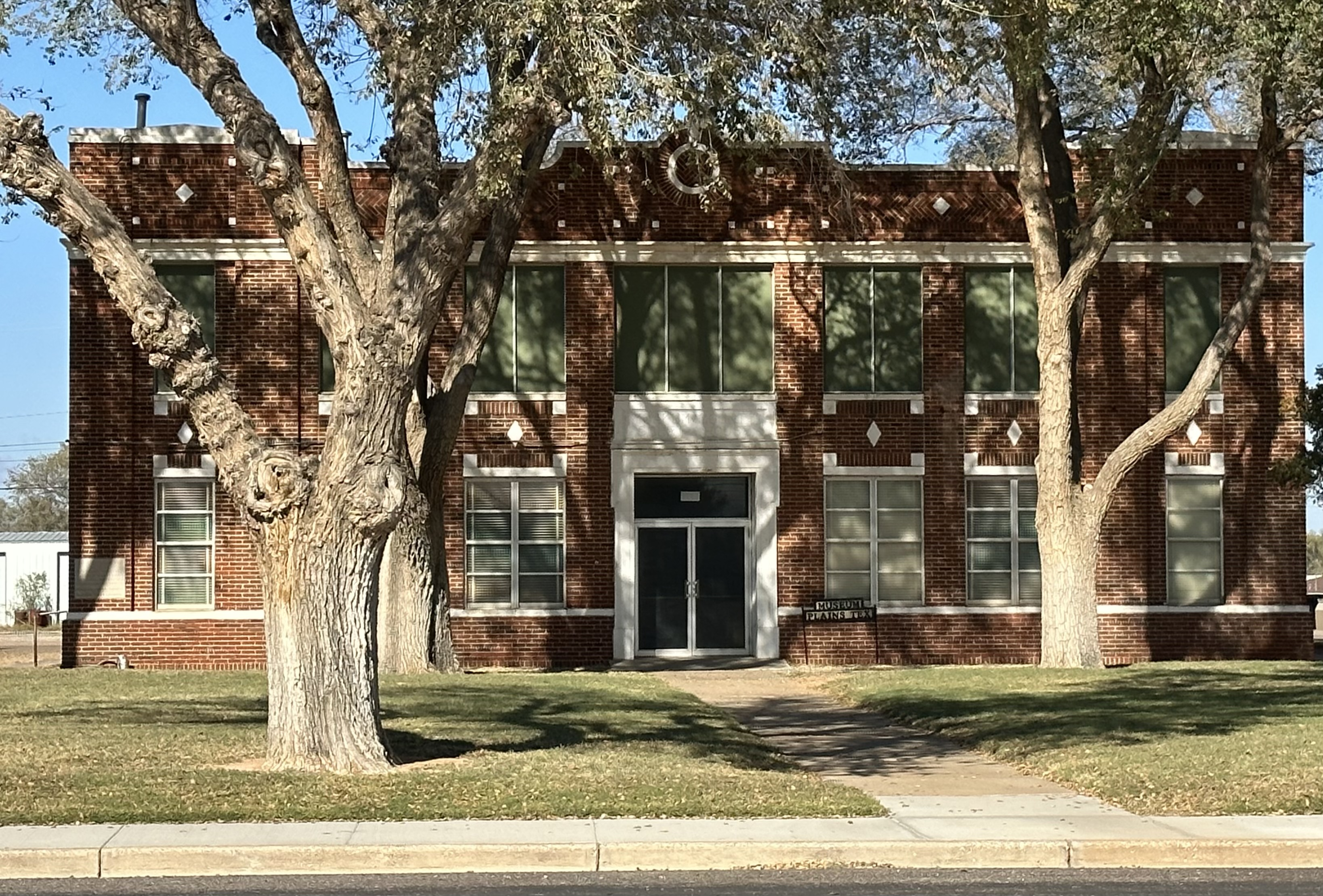
Yoakum County Heritage and Art Museum

Plains racial composition
| Race | Number | Percentage |
|---|---|---|
| White (non-Hispanic) | 456 | 33.65% |
| Black or African American (non-Hispanic) | 1 | 0.07% |
| Native American | 6 | 0.44% |
| Other/mixed | 27 | 1.99% |
| Hispanic or Latino | 865 | 63.84% |
| Total | 1,355 | |

As of the 2020 United States census, 1,355 people, 428 households, and 346 families were residing in the town.

=== 2000 census ===
At the 2000 census, 1,450 people, 485 households, and 390 families were living in the town. The population density was 1,466 inhabitants per square mile (566/km^{2}). The 569 housing units had an average density of 575 per square mile (222/km^{2}). The racial makeup of the town was 69.66% White, 0.76% Native American, 0.07% Asian, 0.07% Pacific Islander, 27.79% from other races, and 1.66% from two or more races. Hispanics or Latinos of any race were 53.03% of the population.

Of the 485 households, 42.3% had children under 18 living with them, 68.0% were married couples living together, 8.9% had a female householder with no husband present, and 19.4% were not families. About 17.1% of households were one person, and 8.7% were one person 65 or older. The average household size was 2.98 and the average family size was 3.37.

The age distribution was 32.6% under 18, 8.1% from 18 to 24, 27.4% from 25 to 44, 20.7% from 45 to 64, and 11.2% 65 or older. The median age was 34 years. For every 100 females, there were 97 males. For every 100 females 18 and over, there were 91 males.

The median income for a household was $32,188 and for a family was $36,250. Males had a median income of $27,188 versus $21,042 for females. The per capita income for the town was $14,624. About 17.2% of families and 20.2% of the population were below the poverty line, including 28.9% of those under 18 and 23.5% of those 65 or over.

== Education ==
The Town of Plains is served by the Plains Independent School District.

== Notable person ==
- Clyde "Bulldog" Turner, a member of the Professional Football Hall of Fame.
