= BCISD =

BCISD may stand for:

- Bay City Independent School District in Bay City, Texas
- Bridge City Independent School District in Bridge City, Texas
- Borden County Independent School District in Gail, Texas
- Burnet County Independent School District in Burnet County, Texas (Unincorporated Territory)
