= Casey Vincent =

Casey Vincent may refer to:

- Casey Vincent (athlete), Australian athlete of the 2000 and 2004 Olympic games
- Clinton D. "Casey" Vincent (1914–1955), U.S. Air Force fighter ace and general officer
