= Borden, Texas =

- Unincorporated community
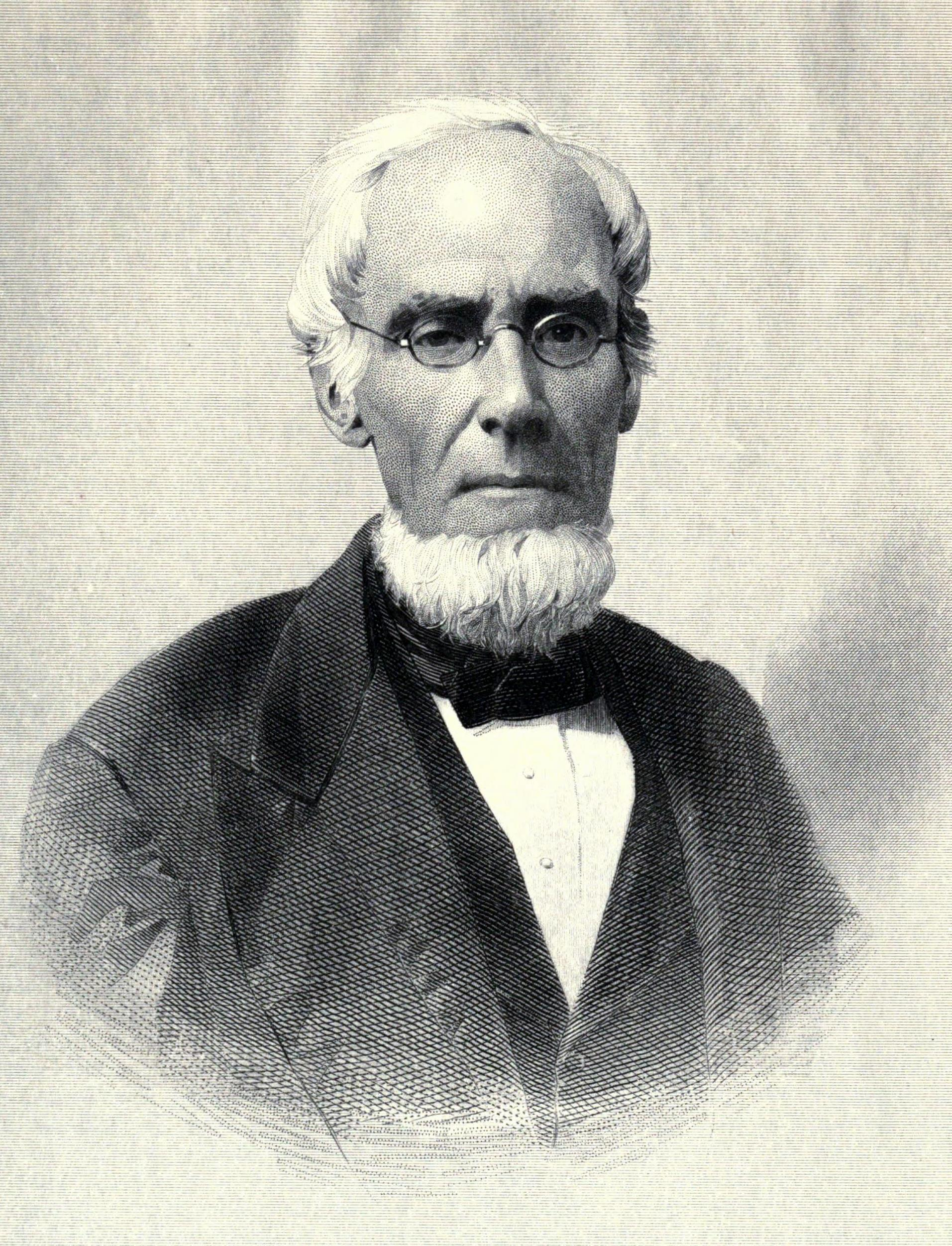
- Gail Borden, the namesake of the community

- Location within Texas Location within the United States
- Coordinates: 29°41′29″N 96°42′07″W
- Country: United States
- State: Texas
- County: Colorado
- Named for: Gail Borden
- Elevation: 328 ft (100 m)
- Time zone: UTC-6 (Central (CST))
  - Summer (DST): UTC-5 (CDT)
- Area code: 979
- GNIS feature ID: 1378033

Borden is an unincorporated community in southwestern Colorado County, Texas, United States. According to the Handbook of Texas, the community had a population of 60 in 2000.

The community was known as Harvey's Creek Settlement before the Civil War. After the war ended, Gail Borden returned to Texas, and at what would become Borden, built houses for himself, his brother, and his sons. He renamed the settlement Bordenville. The Galveston, Harrisburg and San Antonio Railway opened its line through the Borden area in 1872.

== Geography ==
Borden is located between Interstate 10 and U.S. Highway 90 on the Southern Pacific Railroad, 8 mi (13 km) west of Columbus, 4 mi (6.4 km) northeast of Weimar, and 80 mi (130 km) west of Houston in southwestern Colorado County.

== Education ==
Gail Borden built a school for white children and a freedmen's school for black children, which continued to operate in 1874. In 1948, the Borden area schools were consolidated into the Weimar Independent School District.

== Government and infrastructure ==
In 1938, the Texas Highway Department announced plans to construct a lake and roadside park in Borden. They are the only visible infrastructure of years gone by in Borden. The lake was to be constructed along US 90, then called the Houston-San Antonio State Highway No. 3. The Feb. 18, 1938, Eagle Lake Headlight announced that the new seven-acre lake “destined to become one of the main attractions", along the Houston-San Antonio highway. Work began on the project by February 1938, with "a modest beginning as a roadside park,” according to the Headlight. The lake was to be placed about a quarter mile from what was the existing highway and directly west of State Highway 3, which eventually became Interstate 10. State Highway 3 bypassed Borden at what is now Hatterman Lane. A creek then running through the site was to be dammed to fill the lake. "Workmen are busy now in damming up the creek, pulling down a hill in this vicinity, and utilizing [sic] dirt from this elsewhere to form banks for the new lake," M.B. Hodges, state highway division engineer from Yoakum told the Headlight in 1938. Initial plans for the lake included eventual stocking with fish and a multiyear moratorium on fishing before opening the lake to sports enthusiasts.
