= Weimar Independent School District =

School district in Texas, United States

Address
- 1189 Highway 90 West Weimar, Colorado County, Texas; United States

District information
- Schools: 3
- NCES District ID: 4844820

Students and staff
- Students: 722
- Teachers: 61.85 (on an FTE basis)
- Student–teacher ratio: 11.67:1

Other information
- Website: www.weimarisd.org

Weimar Independent School District is a public school district based in Weimar, Texas, United States.

Located in Colorado County, the district extends into small portions of Fayette and Lavaca Counties. The district has served the unincorporated area of Borden since 1948, when the Borden area schools were consolidated into the Weimar district.

In 2023, Weimar ISD received a "B" rating from the Texas Education Agency.

== Schools ==
- Weimar High School (grades 9-12)
- Weimar Junior High School (grades 5-8)
- Weimar Elementary School (prekindergarten-grade 4)
