= Weimar High School =

Location
- 506 West Main Street; Weimar, Texas 78962-1907; United States; 29.703579°N 96.787919°W

Information
- School type: Public high school
- School district: Weimar Independent School District
- Principal: Stacy Heger
- Staff: 20.90 (on an FTE basis)
- Grades: 9-12
- Enrollment: 199 (2023–2024)
- Student to teacher ratio: 9.52
- Colors: Purple & Gold
- Athletics conference: UIL Class AA
- Mascot: Wildcat
- Yearbook: The Claw
- Website: Weimar High School

Weimar High School is a public high school located in Weimar, Texas (USA) and classified as a 2A school by the UIL. It is part of the Weimar Independent School District located in western Colorado County. In 2015, the school was rated "Met Standard" by the Texas Education Agency.

== Extracurricular activities ==
Weimar High School's athletic teams are known as the Wildcats and Ladycats. Weimar High School also fields strong UIL academic teams in addition to an award-winning FFA Chapter-

- Baseball
- Basketball
- Cross Country
- Football
- Golf
- Powerlifting
- Softball
- Tennis
- Track and Field
- Volleyball

=== State championships ===
- Baseball -
  - 1996(2A), 1997(2A), 2000(2A), 2001(2A), 2003(2A)
- Boys Golf -
  - 1969(1A), 1970(1A), 1990(2A), 1991(2A), 2012(2A), 2013(1A) 2014(1A)
- Girls Golf -
  - 1989(2A) 2014(1A)
- Softball -
  - 2002(2A), 2003(2A), 2006(2A), 2013(1A), 2014(1A), 2023(2A)
- Boys Track -
  - 1957(B), 1959(1A)
- Girls Track -
  - 1990(2A)
- One Act Play -
  - 1982(2A)

Girls Basketball 2016 (2A)

Literary Criticism 2004 (2A), 2007 (2A), 2009 (2A), 2016 (2A)

Lone Star Cup Champions: 2003, 2013, 2014

==== State finalists ====
- Softball -
  - 2001(2A)
- Baseball -
  - 2002(2A)
- Powerlifting
  - 1997, 1998, 1999 (Brandon Kocurek, 198lb class)

==== State semi-finalists ====
Baseball 2013 (1A)

Boys Basketball 1979 (2A)

Softball 2021 (2A) 2022 (2A)

Girls Basketball 2014 (1A), 2015 (2A), 2016 (2A)

Volleyball 2015 (2A), 2016 (2A)

== Notable alumni ==
- Ken Konz, NFL defensive back
