= Gail Borden =

American entrepreneur (1801–1874)

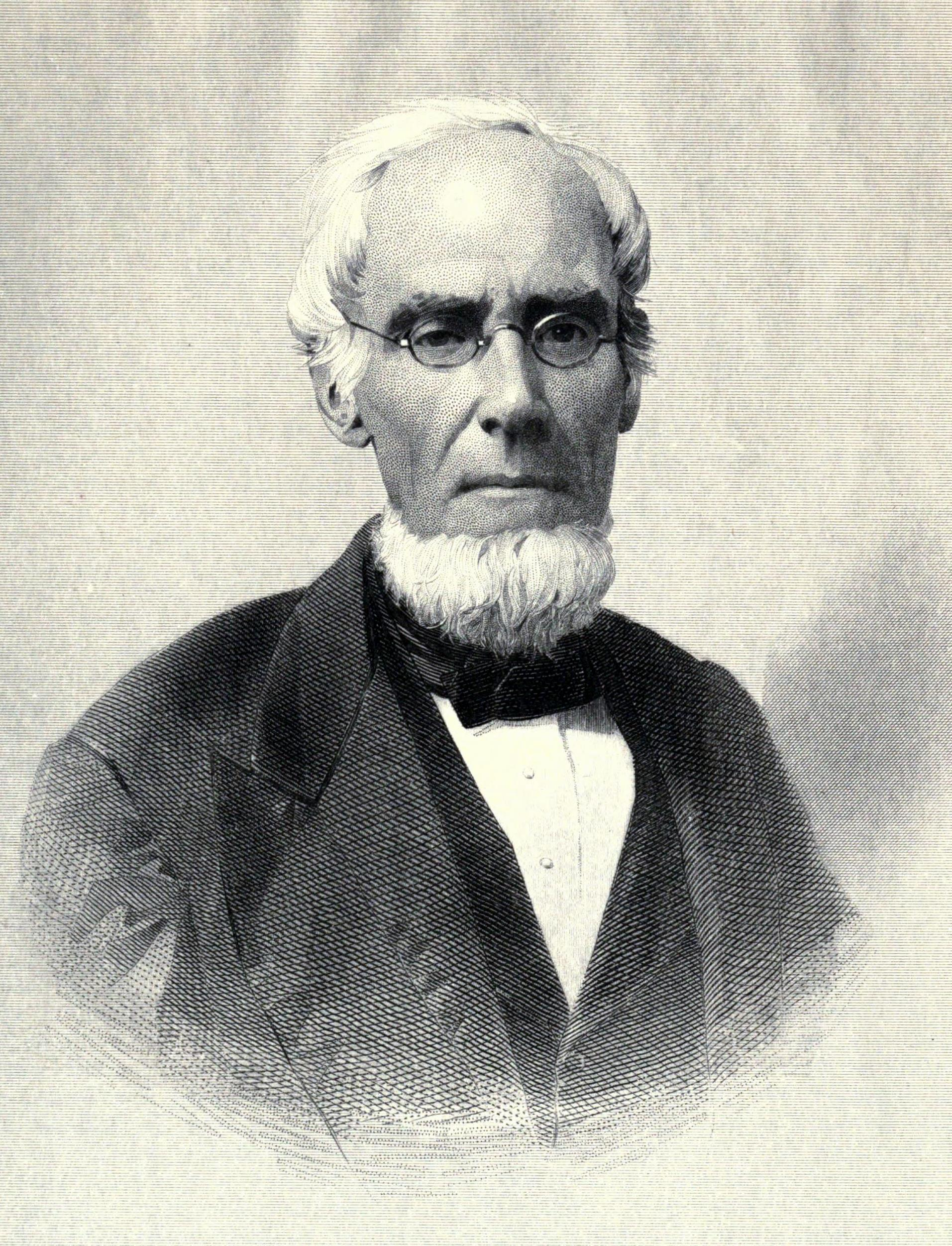
- Born: Gail Borden II; November 9, 1801; Norwich, New York, US
- Died: January 11, 1874 (aged 72); Borden, Texas, US
- Resting place: Woodlawn Cemetery, Bronx, New York City
- Citizenship: American, Mexican
- Occupations: county surveyor, cartographer, schoolteacher, newspaper owner, soldier, politician, inventor, businessman
- Employer(s): Mexican government, Republic of Texas government, self-employed
- Known for: Inventing condensed milk
- Spouse: Penelope Mercer
- Children: 6
- Parent(s): Gail Borden Sr. (father) and Philadelphia Wheeler (mother)
- Relatives: Thomas Borden (brother), John Borden (brother), Paschal Borden (brother)
- Military career
- Allegiance: Republic of Texas; United States
- Service years: Texian Army (1835–1836)
- Conflicts: Texas Revolution

Signature
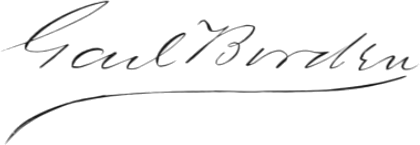

Gail Borden Jr. (November 9, 1801 – January 11, 1874) was an American inventor and manufacturing pioneer. He was born in New York state and settled in Texas in 1829 (then part of Mexico), where he worked as a land surveyor, newspaper publisher, and food company entrepreneur. He created a process in 1853 to make sweetened condensed milk. Earlier, Borden helped plan the cities of Houston and Galveston in 1836.

Borden's process for making sweetened condensed milk enabled the dairy product to be transported and stored without refrigeration and for longer periods than fresh milk. After returning to the New York area to market another product, he set up factories for condensed milk in Connecticut and later in New York and Illinois. Demand by the Union Army was high during the American Civil War. His New York Condensed Milk Company changed its name to Borden Dairy Co. after his death.

== Early life ==
Gail Borden Jr. was born in Norwich, New York, on November 9, 1801, to Gail Borden Sr. (1777–1863), and Philadelphia (née Wheeler) Borden (1780–1828). The family moved to Kennedy's Ferry, Kentucky (renamed as Covington in 1814). There, he learned the art of surveying while aiding his father in the surveying of what would become Covington. Borden also moved to New London, Indiana, in 1816. Borden received his only formal schooling in Indiana during 1816 and 1817.

In 1822, Borden and his brother Thomas left home and settled in Amite County, Mississippi. Borden stayed in Liberty for seven years, working as the county surveyor and as a schoolteacher in Bates and Zion Hill.

His mother died at age 48 from yellow fever in Nashville, Tennessee, perhaps while visiting a grown child and family.

== Migration to Texas ==
After initially landing in Texas at Galveston Island at the end of 1829, Borden settled in what is currently Fort Bend County, where he surveyed and raised stock. After a short time, he took over as chief surveyor for Stephen F. Austin.

Borden and his family left Mississippi in 1829 and moved to Texas, where his father and brother John had settled. (His mother had died the previous year.) His brother Thomas also settled in Texas. As a surveyor, Borden plotted the towns of Houston and Galveston. He collaborated on drawing the first topographical map of Texas in 1835.

== Texas Revolution ==
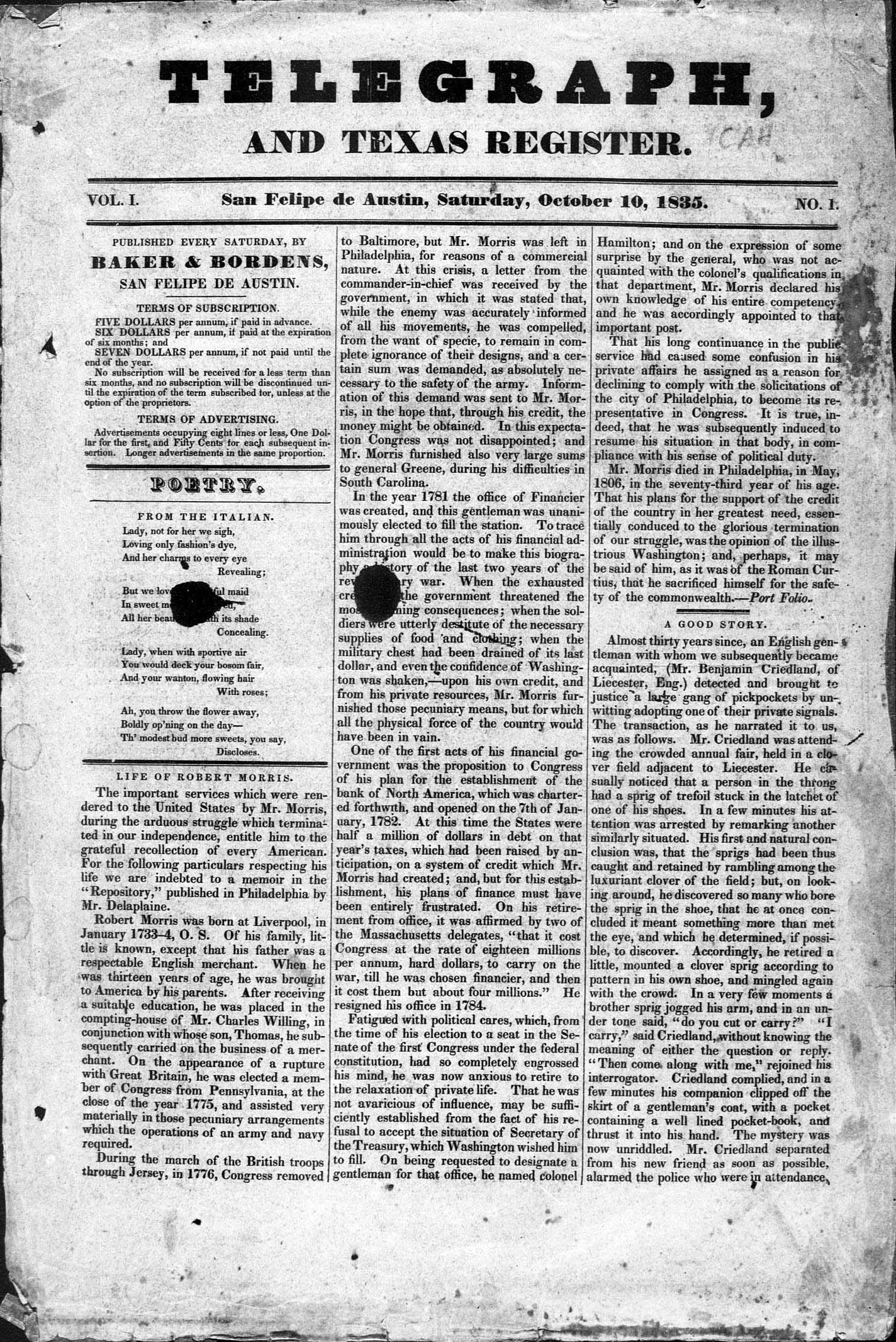
The October 10, 1835, first edition of the Telegraph and Texas Register newspaper published through the partnership of Gail Borden Jr., his brother John, and Joseph Baker in San Felipe, Texas

In February 1835, Gail and his brother John entered into partnership with Joseph Baker to publish one of the first newspapers in Texas. Although none of the three had any previous printing experience, Baker was considered "one of the best informed men in the Texian colony on the Texas-Mexican situation". The men based their newspaper in San Felipe de Austin, which was centrally located among the colonies in eastern Texas. They ran the first issue under the banner of Telegraph and Texas Planter on October 10, 1835, days after the Texas Revolution began, though the later issues bore the name Telegraph and Texas Register. As editor, Gail Borden worked to be objective.

Soon after the newspaper began publishing, John Borden left to join the Texian Army, and their brother Thomas took his place as Borden's partner. Historian Eugene C. Barker describes the Borden newspaper as "an invaluable repository of public documents during this critical period of the state's history". The early format of the paper was three columns to a page with a total of eight pages. The Telegraph printed official documents and announcements, editorials, local news, reprints of articles from other newspapers, poetry, and advertisements.

The design of Baker's San Felipe flag during the Texas Revolution was supposedly inspired by Gail Borden Jr. while he was in the service of the Texian Army. It was said to have been flown at the Battle of San Jacinto on April 21, 1836.

As the Mexican Army moved east into the Texian colonies, the Telegraph was soon the only newspaper in Texas still operating. Their 21st issue was published on March 24. This contained the first list of names of Texans who died at the Battle of the Alamo. On March 27, the Texas Army reached San Felipe, carrying word that the Mexican advance guard was approaching. According to a later editorial in the Telegraph, the publishers were "the last to consent to move". The Bordens dismantled the printing press and brought it with them as they evacuated with the rear guard on March 30. The Bordens retreated to Harrisburg. On April 14, as they were in the process of printing a new issue, Mexican soldiers arrived and seized the press. The soldiers threw the type and press into Buffalo Bayou and arrested the Bordens. The Texas Revolution ended days later.

Supposedly, during the war, Gail Borden Jr. helped to design the Baker's San Felipe flag which was flown in the Battle of San Jacinto on April 21, 1836.

== After the war ==
Lacking funds to replace his equipment, Borden mortgaged his land to buy a new printing press in Cincinnati. The 23rd issue of the Telegraph was published in Columbia on August 2, 1836. Although many had expected Columbia to be the new capital, the First Texas Congress instead chose the new city of Houston. Borden relocated to Houston and published the first Houston issue of his paper on May 2, 1837.

The newspaper was in financial difficulty, as the Bordens rarely paid their bills. In March 1837, Thomas Borden sold his interest in the enterprise to Francis W. Moore Jr., who took over as chief editor. Three months later, Gail Borden transferred his shares to Jacob W. Cruger.

== Political career and early inventions ==
Borden was a delegate at the Convention of 1833, where he assisted in writing early drafts of a Republic of Texas constitution. He also shared administrative duties with Samuel May Williams during 1833 and 1834 when Stephen F. Austin was away in Mexico.

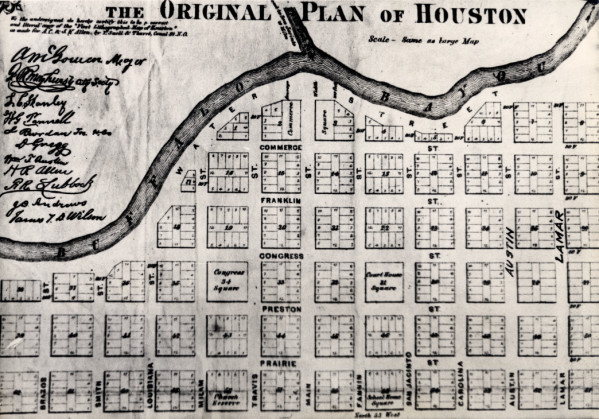
1869 Houston map showing the grid laid out by Borden

President Sam Houston appointed Borden as the Republic of Texas Collector of Customs at Galveston in June 1837. He was popular and performed his job well, raising half of the government income during this period through his collection on importations. Houston's successor to the presidency, Mirabeau B. Lamar, removed Borden from office in December 1838, replacing him in the patronage position with a lifelong friend from Mobile, Alabama, Dr. Willis Roberts, newly arrived in Texas. Roberts' son later was appointed Secretary of State of the Republic. Lamar was said to have known Roberts for 25 years. However, Borden had been so well liked, the newcomer was resented. The Galveston News frequently criticized the new regime about malfeasance.

When a shortage of funds came to light, Roberts offered to put up several personal houses and nine slaves as collateral until the matter could be settled. Two resentful desk clerks were later determined to have been embezzling funds. Roberts was replaced in December 1839, when Lamar appointed another man.

After Houston was re-elected to the presidency, he reappointed Borden to the post. The publisher served December 1841 to April 1843. He finally resigned after a dispute with Houston.

Borden assisted in the original survey of Galveston. Working for the Galveston City Company, the surveying team laid out the east end of the island in a gridiron pattern, similar to major cities on the east coast of the US. Streets running the length of the island, from west to east, were named as avenues, according to the alphabet and in ascending order. Avenue A was the first avenue on the bay side, and this sequence continued through Avenue Q, running parallel to the Gulf of Mexico. Intersecting the avenues were numbered streets, starting with Eighth Street and continuing through Fifty-Eighth Street, which formed the western edge of the property owned by the Galveston City Company. In addition to surveying, he also he served the Galveston Town Company for 12 years as a secretary and agent. During that period, he helped sell 2,500 lots of land, for a total of $1,500,000.

In the 1840s, he began to experiment with disease cures and mechanics. His wife Penelope died of yellow fever on September 5, 1844. Frequent epidemics had swept through the nation, and the disease had a high rate of fatalities during the 19th century. Borden began experimenting with finding a cure to the disease via refrigeration. No one understood how it was transmitted. He also experimented with an amphibious vehicle that he called a "terraqueous machine". This was a sail-powered wagon designed to travel over land and sea, but designed more specifically for the western prairies. He abandoned the invention after a test run resulted in ejecting its riders into the Gulf of Mexico.

== Processed foods ==
=== Meat biscuits ===
In 1849, Borden started experimenting with beef processing. He developed a dehydrated beef product known as the "meat biscuit", which was loosely based upon a traditional Native American processed dried food known as pemmican. Pioneers seeking gold in California needed a readily transportable food that could endure harsh conditions, and Borden sold some of his meat biscuits to miners. Notably, explorer Elisha Kane purchased several hundred pounds of meat biscuits for his Arctic expedition. The product won Borden the Great Council Medal at the 1851 London World's Fair, and the same year he set up a meat-biscuit factory in Galveston. Entering middle age with $100,000, equivalent to $3,700,000 in 2023, he put these at risk for his newest invention. His desired markets were military organizations, domestic or foreign, which required easily transported food that did not spoil easily. He prepared promotional materials, arranged for product trials, and demonstrated the preparation of meat biscuits at cooking facilities for hospitals and ships. He invested $60,000, equivalent to $2,200,000 in 2023, yet none of these large institutional customers materialized. Not only did people complain about the taste and texture, but the U.S. Army concluded that the meat biscuits failed to slake hunger and even made people ill. In 1852, Borden filed for bankruptcy protection.

=== Condensed milk ===
In 1851, during Borden's return voyage from the London exhibition, a disease infected both cows aboard the ship. (Ships carried livestock to supply passenger and crew needs during a voyage.) The cows eventually died, as did several children who drank the contaminated milk. Contamination often threatened other supplies of milk across the country. Borden became interested in developing a way to preserve milk.

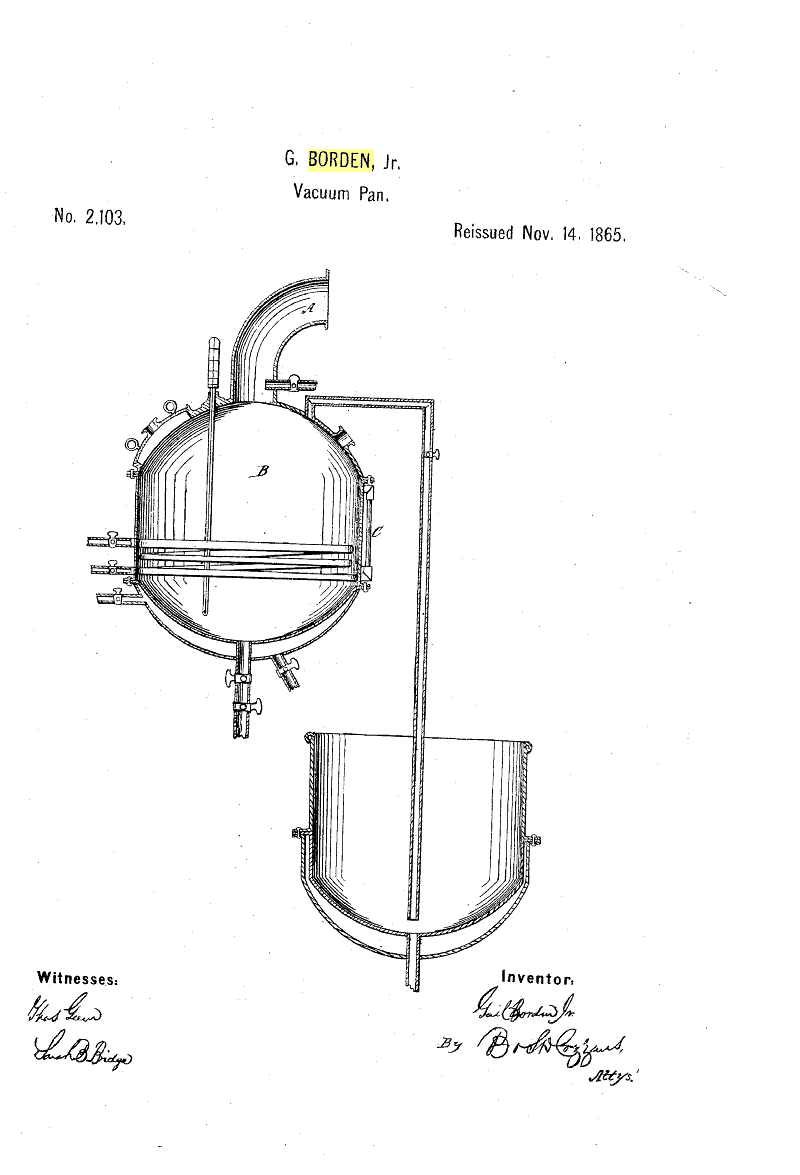
U.S. Patent RE2103 "Vacuum Pan" for Improvements in Condensing Milk issued November 14, 1865

He was inspired by the vacuum pan he had seen being used by Shakers to condense fruit juice and herbs. He learned to reduce milk without scorching or curdling it. His first two factories established to manufacture it failed. With his third factory, built with new partner Jeremiah Milbank in Wassaic, New York, Borden finally produced a usable milk derivative that was long-lasting and needed no refrigeration.

In 1856, after three years of refining his model, Borden received the patent for his process of condensing milk by vacuum. He abandoned the meat biscuit, to focus on his new product. Borden was forced to recruit financial partners to begin production and marketing of this new product. He offered Thomas Green three-eighths of his patent rights and gave James Bridge a quarter interest on his investment; together, the three men built a condensery in Wolcottville, Connecticut (within modern-day Torrington), which opened in 1856. Green and Bridge were eager for profits, and when the factory was not immediately successful, they withdrew their support. The factory closed within a year.

To ensure against disease, Borden established strict sanitary requirements (the "Dairyman's Ten Commandments") for farmers who wanted to sell him raw milk; they were required to wash the cows' udders before milking, keep barns swept clean, and scald and dry their strainers morning and night. By 1858, Borden's condensed milk, sold as Eagle Brand, had gained a reputation for purity, durability, and economy.

Borden persuaded his former partners and a third investor, Reuel Williams, to build a new factory. It opened in 1857 in Burrville, Connecticut (also within modern-day Torrington). This second factory was hurt by the Panic of 1857 and had trouble turning a profit. The following year, Borden's fortunes began to change after he met Jeremiah Milbank, a financier from New York, on a train. Milbank was impressed by Borden's enthusiasm for and confidence in condensed milk, and the two became equal partners. Together, they founded the New York Condensed Milk Company. As a railroad magnate and banker, Milbank understood large-scale finance, which was critical to development of the business and Borden's success. Milbank invested around $100,000 into Borden's business. When Milbank died in 1884, the market value of his holdings was estimated at $8,000,000.

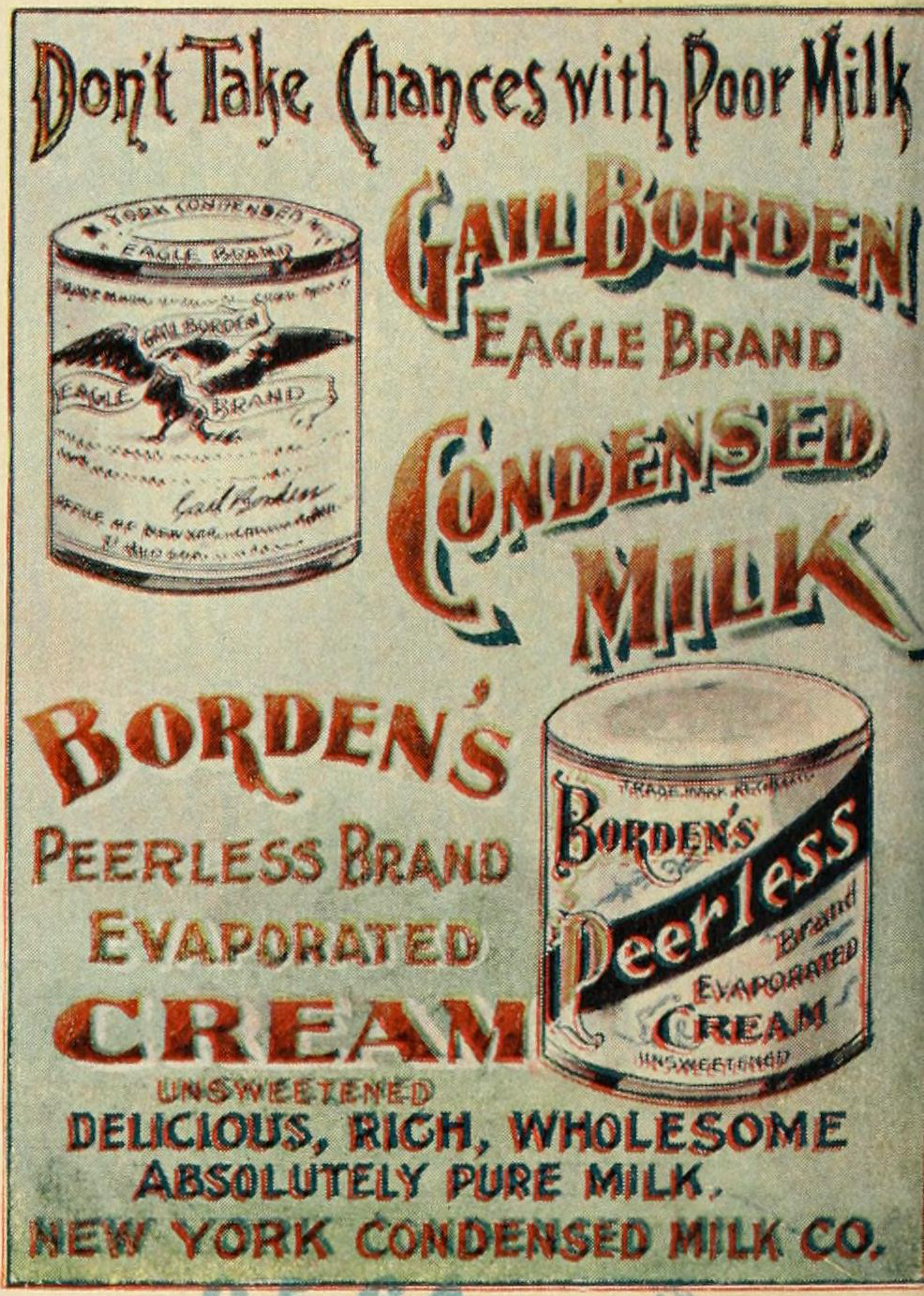
Advertisement for Gail Borden's Eagle Brand Condensed Milk from an 1898 guidebook for travelers in the Klondike Gold Rush

With the founding of the New York Condensed Milk Company, sales of Borden's condensed milk began to improve. The outbreak of the Civil War in 1861 soon after created a large demand for condensed milk from the Union Army. Officers purchased several hundred pounds of milk for their soldiers. In 1861, Borden closed the factory in Burrville, opening the first of what would be many condensed milk factories in upstate New York and Illinois, which were centers of dairy farming.

Around this same time, Borden married his third wife, Emeline Eunice Eno Church.

In 1864, Gail Borden's New York Condensed Milk Company constructed the New York Milk Condensery in Brewster, New York. This was the largest and most advanced milk factory of its day, and it was Borden's first commercially successful plant. Over 200 dairy farmers supplied 20,000 U.S. gallons (76,000 liters) of milk daily to the Brewster plant as demand increased driven by the American Civil War.

As the Civil War continued, he expanded his New York Condensed Milk Company quickly to meet the growing demand. Many new factories were built and he granted licenses (for pay) to individuals to begin producing condensed milk in their own factories, using Borden's patent. Despite the quick growth of the company, Borden continued to emphasize strict sanitation. He developed cleanliness practices that continue to be used in the production of condensed milk to this day.

While this rapid growth was occurring, Borden continued to experiment with condensing meat, tea, coffee, and cocoa. In 1862 while operating a factory in Amenia, New York, he patented the condensing of juice from fruits, such as apples and grapes. Borden tried to incorporate these other products into the line of the New York Condensed Milk Company, but the greatest demand was always for milk. It continued as the company's major product.

Throughout Borden's business success, he maintained an eye toward the scientific community. He published reports filled with testimonials of "impartial" scientists who observed and tested his inventions, including the meat biscuit and condensed milk. Borden coupled ambition for success with an enduring desire to produce quality products.

== Personal life ==
In 1828, Borden married Penelope Mercer of Amite County, Mississippi. The couple had five children during their 16-year marriage. Penelope Borden contracted yellow fever and died in Galveston in 1844. On February 15, 1845, he married A. [Augusta or Azalea] F. Stearns in Galveston. She died in 1857. In 1860, he married Emeline E. (Eno) Church in Connecticut.

== Death and legacy ==
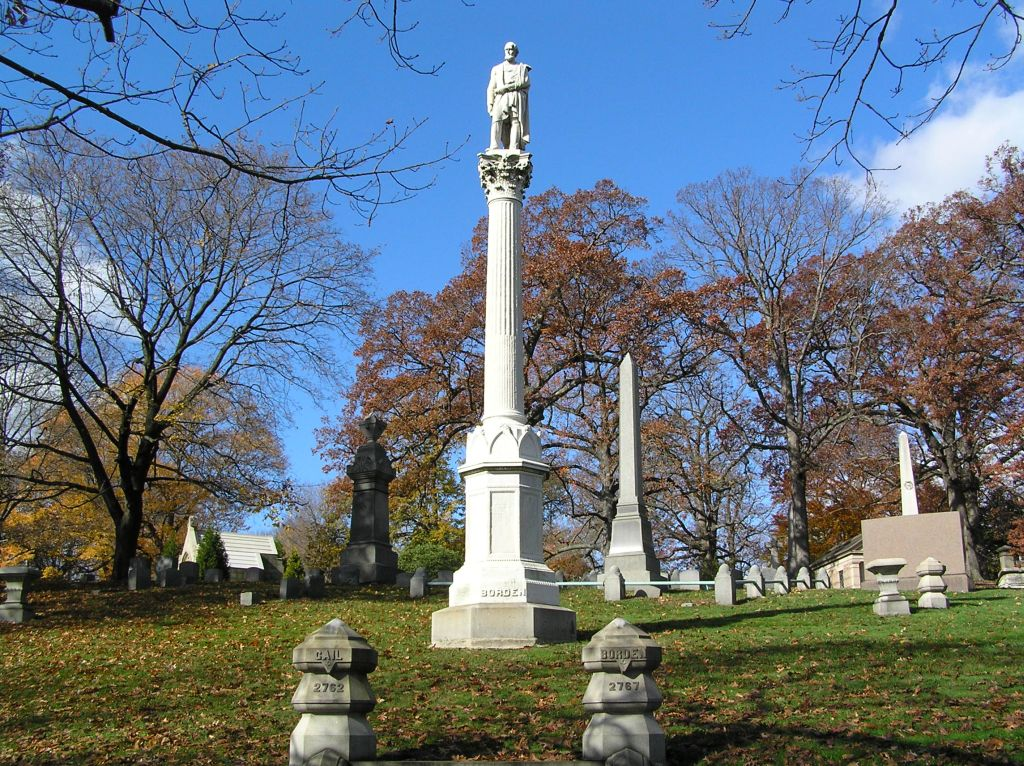
The Gail Borden monument in Woodlawn Cemetery, Bronx, New York City

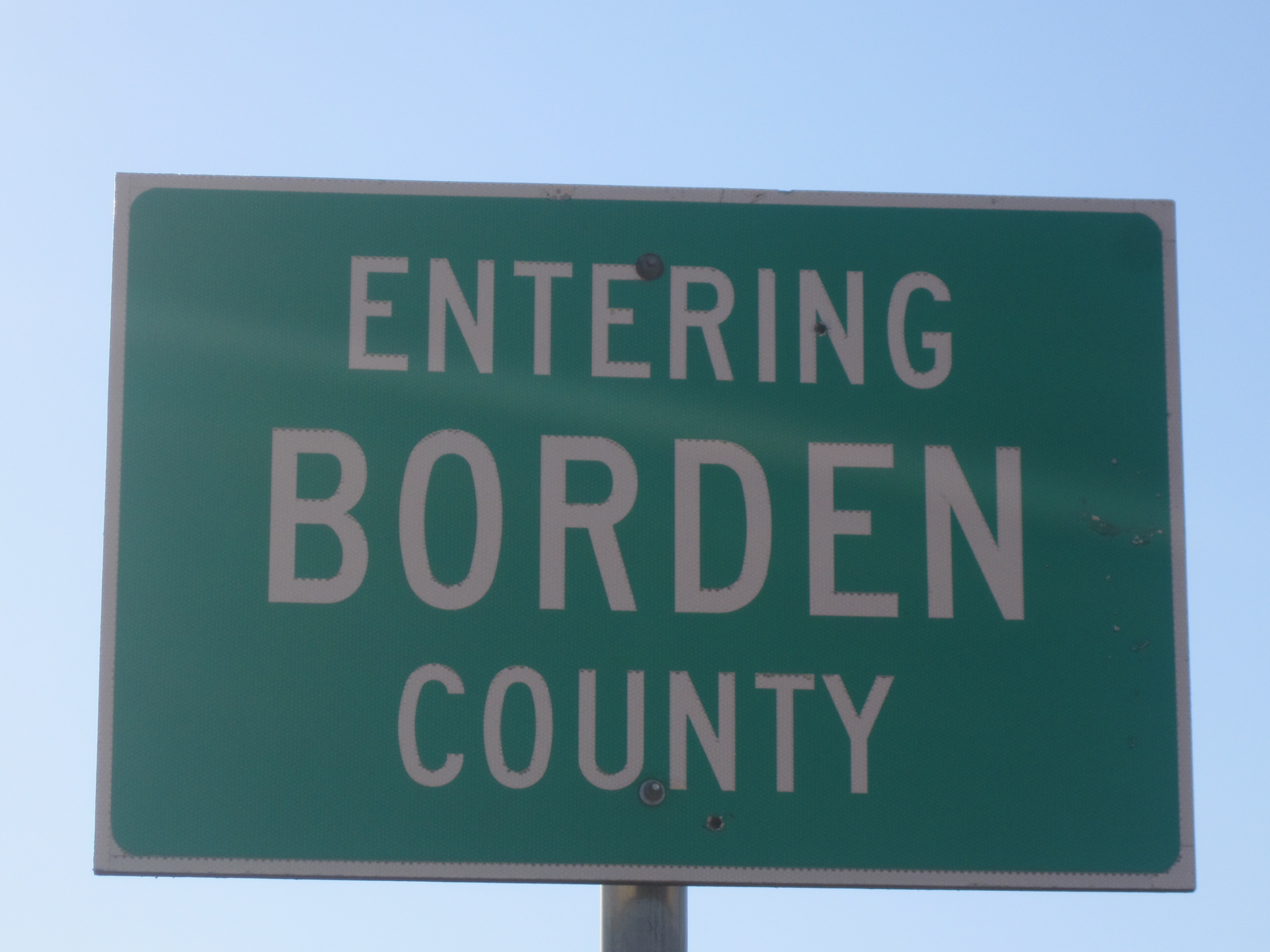
Borden County limits sign on U.S. Highway 180 east of Gail, Texas

Borden died on January 11, 1874, in Borden in Colorado County, Texas. His body was shipped by private car to New York City to be buried in Woodlawn Cemetery.

Borden County, Texas, where he had never been, was named for him posthumously, as was its county seat, Gail. Borden, Texas, was also named for him.

The New York Condensed Milk Company changed its name in 1899, to honor Borden. It continued to be a strong corporation. By the 1940s, the Borden Company employed 28,000 people and had a stock holding partnership of 50,000. It dealt with more varied products, ranging from fresh and condensed milk, casein, animal feeds, pharmaceuticals, and vitamins, to soybean creations. A version of the company continues today. Now called Eagle Brand, the company's website cites its origins in 1856 with the opening of Borden's first factory.

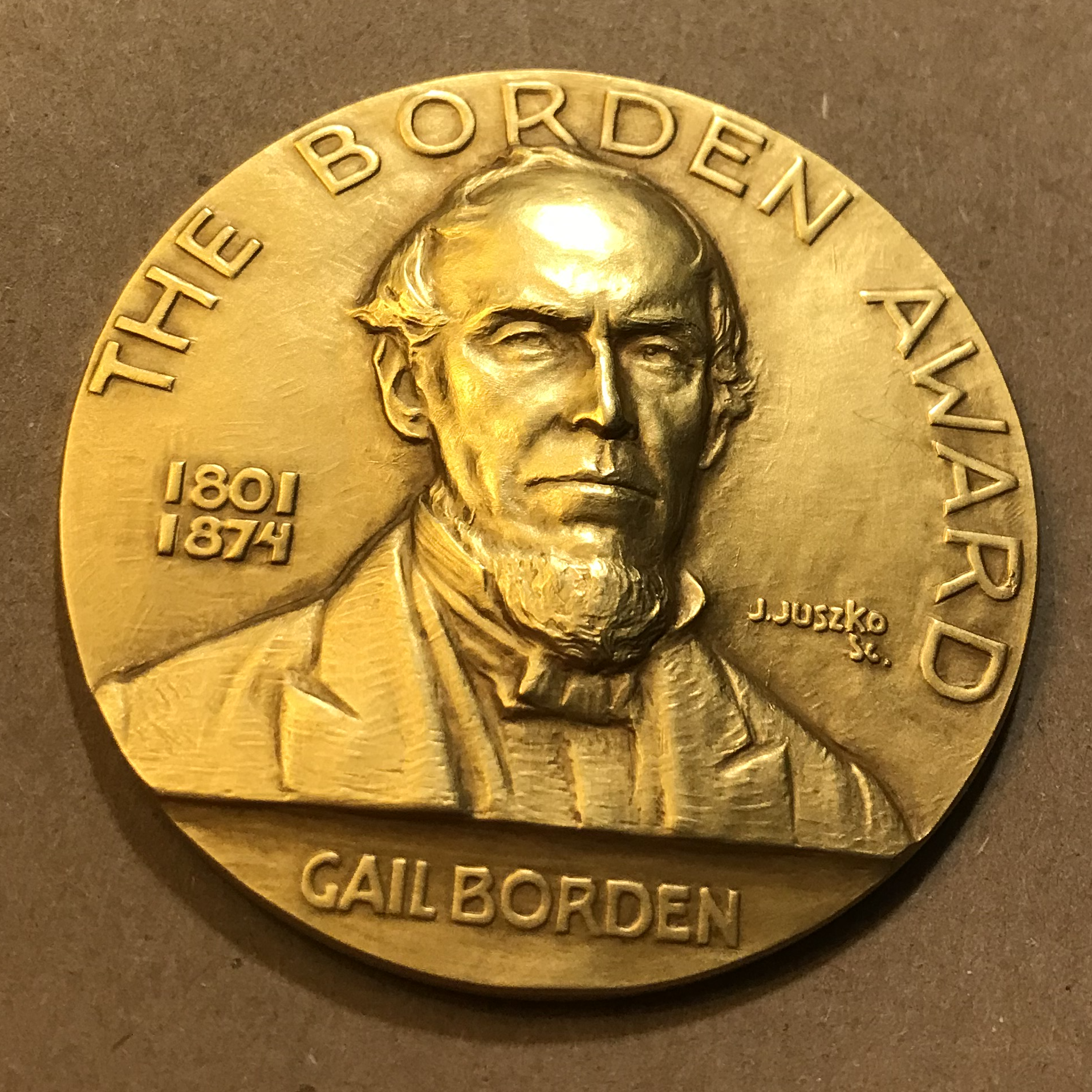
The Borden Award

In 1892, Samuel and Alfred Church, stepsons of Borden, and residents of Elgin, Illinois, purchased and donated the Scofield Mansion at 50 N. Spring Street to house a new library for the residents of Elgin. Samuel and Alfred's only request was that the library be called the Gail Borden Public Library.

The Borden Company established the Borden Award in 1937 and inaugurated it in 1938. The award, given annually "for distinctive contributions to poultry science advancement", consists of a gold medal and $1,000.

== Genealogy ==
Borden was distantly related to Robert Borden (1854–1937), Canada's Prime Minister during World War I. One of his great-grandchildren was Gail Borden, an American figure skater in the 1932 Winter Olympics. Another notable relative is the infamous Lizzie Borden from the Fall River murders. Sir Robert, Lizzie, and Gail Borden (founder) are fourth cousins, all descended from John Borden (b. 1640), the son of Richard from Headcorn, Kent, who immigrated to the United States aboard the ship Elizabeth and Anne in 1635.

== Patents ==
U.S. patent RE2103; November 14, 1865; Improvements in Condensing Milk
