= Borden County High School =

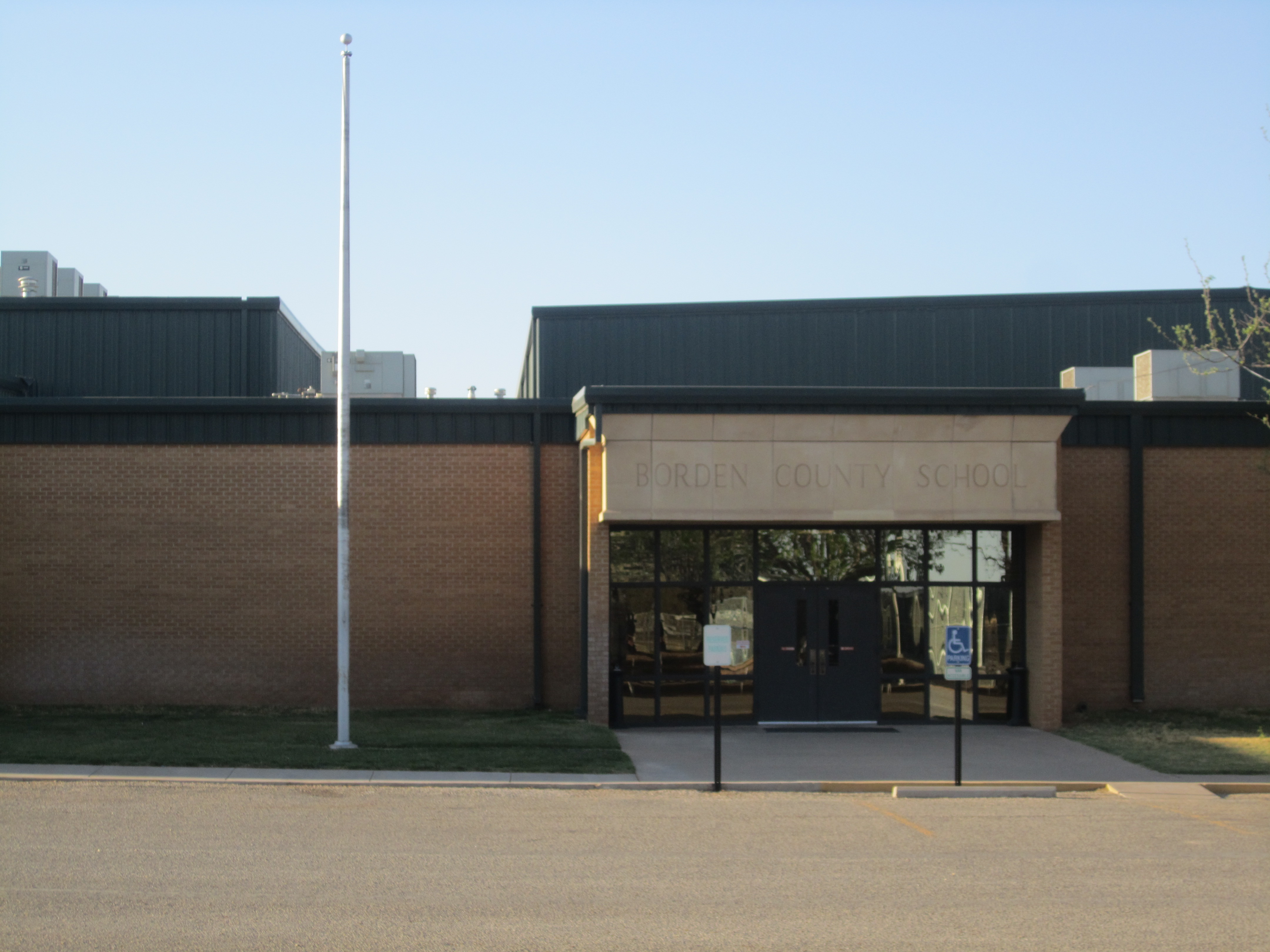
- Borden County School is located across from Bicentennial Park in Gail, Texas.

Location
- 240 West Kincaid Street; Gail, Texas 79738-0095; United States; 32.7761°N 101.4497°W

Information
- School type: Public high school
- Locale: Rural
- School district: Borden County Independent School District
- NCES District ID: 4810860
- Educational authority: Texas Education Agency
- Superintendent: Jimmy Thomas
- CEEB code: 442650
- NCES School ID: 481086000552
- Principal: Steve Cates
- Teaching staff: 22.15 (on an FTE basis)
- Grades: K-12
- Gender: Coeducational
- Enrollment: 242 (2023–2024)
  - Pre-kindergarten: 13
  - Kindergarten: 16
  - Grade 1: 21
  - Grade 2: 19
  - Grade 3: 23
  - Grade 4: 17
  - Grade 5: 20
  - Grade 6: 18
  - Grade 7: 11
  - Grade 8: 15
  - Grade 9: 16
  - Grade 10: 28
  - Grade 11: 16
  - Grade 12: 15
- Student to teacher ratio: 11.24
- Colors: Columbia Blue, Red & White
- Athletics: Yes
- Athletics conference: UIL Class A
- Mascot: Coyote/Lady Coyote
- Yearbook: The Coyote
- Website: www.bcisd.net

Borden County High School or Borden County School is a public high school located in Gail, Texas (USA) and classified as a 1A school by the UIL. It is part of the Borden County Independent School District located in central Borden County. For the 2021-2022 school year, the school was given an "A" by the Texas Education Agency.

== Academics ==
- State Titles
  - Policy Debate
    - 2024 (1A) - Tyler Cole and Randen Williams

== Athletics ==
The Borden County Coyotes compete in these sports -

- Baseball
- Softball
- Basketball
- Cross Country
- 6-Man Football
- Volleyball
- Golf
- Tennis
- Track and Field

=== State titles ===
- Football
  - 1997(6M), 2008(6M/D2), 2009(6M/D2), 2016(6M/D1), 2017 (6M/D1)
- Girls Track -
  - 2013(1A/D2)
- Boys Golf -
  - 2024 (1A)
- 2018, 2019, 2024 & 2025 Class A UIL Academic Texas State Champions
- 2024 UIL Class 1A Lone Star Cup Champions
