= Clinton D. "Casey" Vincent =

United States Air Force general (1914–1955)

Clinton D. Vincent
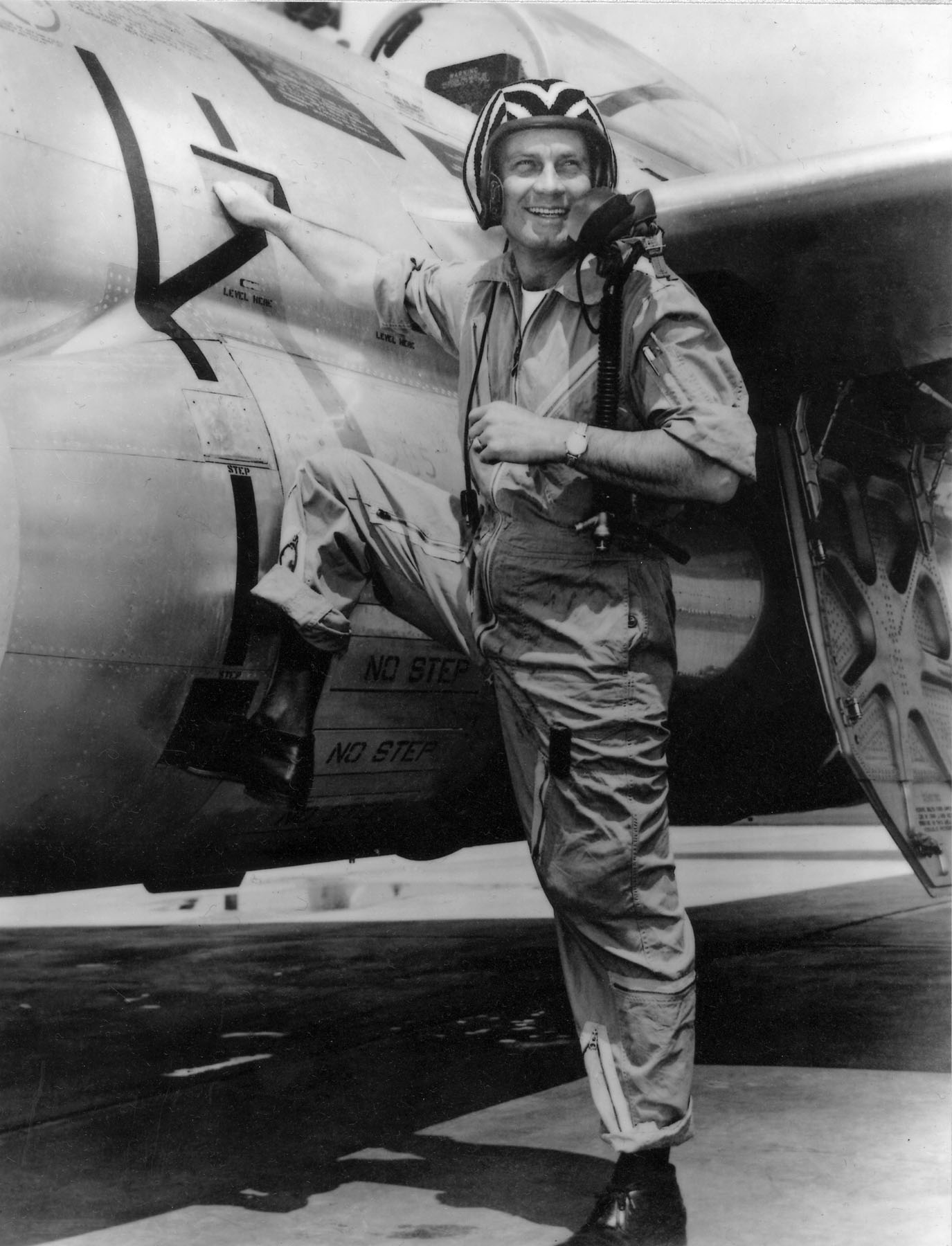
- Casey Vincent steps up to an F-89 Scorpion in the early 1950s.
- Born: November 29, 1914; Gail, Texas, US
- Died: July 5, 1955 (aged 40); Colorado Springs, Colorado, US
- Burial place: Fort Sam Houston National Cemetery
- Military career
- Allegiance: United States
- Branch: United States Army Air Corps; United States Army Air Forces; United States Air Force
- Service years: 1936–1955
- Rank: Brigadier General
- Nickname: "Casey"
- Commands: 35th Pursuit Group; 68th Composite Wing; 25th Air Division
- Conflicts: World War II: China-Burma-India Theater
- Awards: Army Distinguished Service Medal; Silver Star; Legion of Merit; Distinguished Flying Cross (3); Air Medal (4); Purple Heart

Clinton Dermott "Casey" Vincent (November 29, 1914 – July 5, 1955) was an American flying ace who became the second youngest general officer in United States Army Air Forces history. Vincent was one of Claire Chennault's two top fighter commanders in the China Burma India Theater of World War II. He served as the model for two comic strip characters by Milton Caniff: "Colonel Vince Casey", and "Brigadier General P.G. 'Shanty' Town".

Vincent planned and carried out daring offensive air tactics in China, forming the 14th Air Force Forward Echelon which staged out of forward airfields to attack the enemy unexpectedly. The successful concept was twinned and reorganized by Chennault into two mixed-aircraft groups, with Vincent commanding one of them, the 68th Composite Wing. A string of Allied victories throughout 1943 caused the Japanese to plan a major retaliatory move. Beginning in May 1944, the airmen were hit repeatedly and forced into retreat as the Japanese implemented Operation Ichi-Go. Vincent's men demolished their valuable airbases and fell back to Chennault's stronghold at Kunming. Vincent returned to the U.S. afterward, his tour of duty complete.

Back home, Vincent was put in command of a training wing and in 1946 was asked to teach at the Air War College. Following this, he held the position of second-in-command of the Western Air Defense Force. Vincent died of a heart attack in 1955. The United States Air Force (USAF) named an air base after him in 1956: the Vincent Air Force Base in Yuma, Arizona. The airfield was turned over to the Marines in 1962, and is today the Marine Corps Air Station Yuma (Vincent Field).

== Early career ==
Clinton Dermott Vincent was born in 1914 in the small town of Gail, Texas. His parents, Carvin Wyoming Vincent and the former Rosa Lee Burgess, produced 11 children—Vincent was the youngest. He was nicknamed "Casey" from youth. While still a small child, Vincent moved with his family to Natchez, Mississippi, where he went to school. After excelling in high school, Vincent was appointed to the United States Military Academy at West Point, becoming a cadet on July 1, 1932. Vincent graduated on June 12, 1936, and became a second lieutenant.

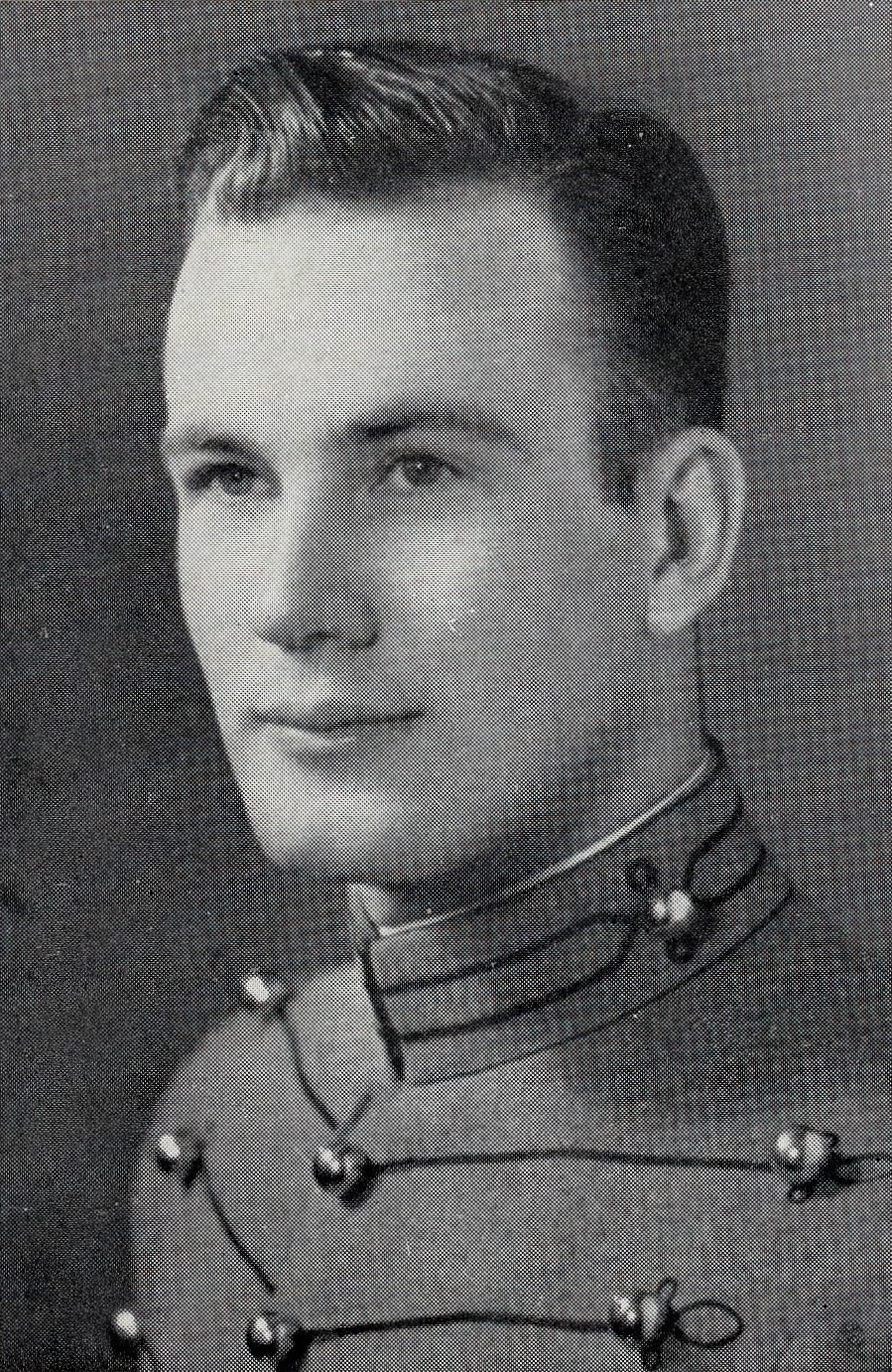
Vincent at West Point

Vincent transferred from the field artillery to the Air Corps and took primary flight training at Randolph Field in Texas, about 500 miles (800 km) from his parents back home. In January 1937, during his primary training, his mother died in Natchez at the age of 65.

Following primary, Vincent took the attack course in advanced flying at Kelly Field in San Antonio, Texas. During a dance held at the officer's club, he met Margaret "Peggy" Hennessey, a young woman with an infant daughter, and fell in love. In November 1937, he was posted operations officer for the 19th Pursuit Squadron at Wheeler Field near Pearl Harbor. Hennessey traveled to Hawaii to be with him, and on February 10, 1938, they married—the couple celebrated the birth of a daughter named Thayer on December 17. The young father rose in rank to first lieutenant in June 1939, then was promoted to captain on October 7, 1940. In November 1940, Vincent transferred to the newly formed 35th Pursuit Group at Hamilton Field in Northern California where he served as squadron commander. The Group trained in several fighter aircraft types, including Seversky P-35s, P-36 Hawks, P-39 Airacobras and P-40 Warhawks. Vincent advanced to group operations officer, then executive officer, then in December 1941 was made group commander. On December 5, two days before the attack on Pearl Harbor, Vincent's wife pinned the gold leaves of a major on his shoulders. That evening, the 35th Pursuit Group shipped out for overseas duty in Manila, to join the group's 21st and 34th Squadrons already there. The next day Peggy Vincent began to drive her two daughters to San Antonio to be with family. On December 7 when Hawaii was attacked by Japanese naval forces, the unarmed ship carrying Vincent, traveling with no escort, was ordered to return immediately to San Francisco Bay. Vincent remained in California for another month, joined by his wife and daughter, during which time he learned that Manila had fallen, and that fellow Group pilot Sam Marrett, a friend from West Point, had died in its defense. On January 12, 1942, the USS Mariposa sailed in convoy with Vincent aboard, headed for the Far East.

== China ==
Vincent arrived in Melbourne, Australia, in early February, then sailed in a different convoy to Perth. In March, he sailed to Karachi, India, and was posted to Karachi American Air Base, one of the more distant ports that supplied The Hump. There, Vincent served as Director of Pursuit Training for the Tenth Air Force at the rank of lieutenant colonel. Wishing for a combat post, in November 1942 he was ordered by Clayton Bissell, commander Tenth Air Force, to transfer to China to join General Claire Chennault and his China Air Task Force (CATF), a group formed from the Flying Tigers. Bissell's orders specified Vincent take the position of Chennault's executive officer, to apply a dose of West Point regimen to the haphazard CATF paperwork, but Chennault, irked at this maneuver by his 2,200-mile (3,500 km) distant superior, instead assigned Vincent operations officer. Three days into the new job, Vincent wrote in his diary, "Any similarity between the China Air Task Force and a military organization is purely accidental." He observed that administrative procedures were poor. "...the Group just runs by itself. All Colonel Scott (Robert Lee Scott, Jr.) cares about is fighting—and he is good at that!"

Vincent cared little what title he served under—he just wanted to fly in combat. After instituting procedural changes regarding the format of official reports originating from CATF, he assigned himself his first air combat flight on November 22, escorting bombers against the harbor of Haiphong on the coast of French Indochina, during which he dropped a bomb from his fighter into the harbor's dock area. Five days later, he scored his first aerial victory: a fixed-undercarriage Japanese fighter he encountered during an attack on Canton in which 10 B-25s and 22 P-40s downed some 16 to 22 enemy aircraft. Vincent noted that he was effectively serving three desk jobs—"'Exec', 'Intelligence', and 'Operations'"—but that Chennault was pleased to find his new administrator a skilled pilot eager to fight.

In the final weeks of 1942, the CATF was often grounded by bad weather. Vincent flew combat in Peggy I on December 12, but two days later he was ordered by Chennault, at Bissell's insistence, to refrain from flying a mission he had planned. Another pilot took Peggy I on that mission but belly-landed the aircraft on a road. Vincent borrowed a different aircraft to fly reconnaissance missions on December 17 and 19, but stayed on the ground again during a short visit by Bissell, to satisfy his expectations. General Joseph Stilwell flew in on December 22 to award Chennault the Distinguished Service Medal, and to take him to Chungking, the provisional wartime capital of China. Left in charge of CATF for the rest of December, Vincent led the combat missions he put together. On December 24 he was awarded the Silver Star for his combat performance.

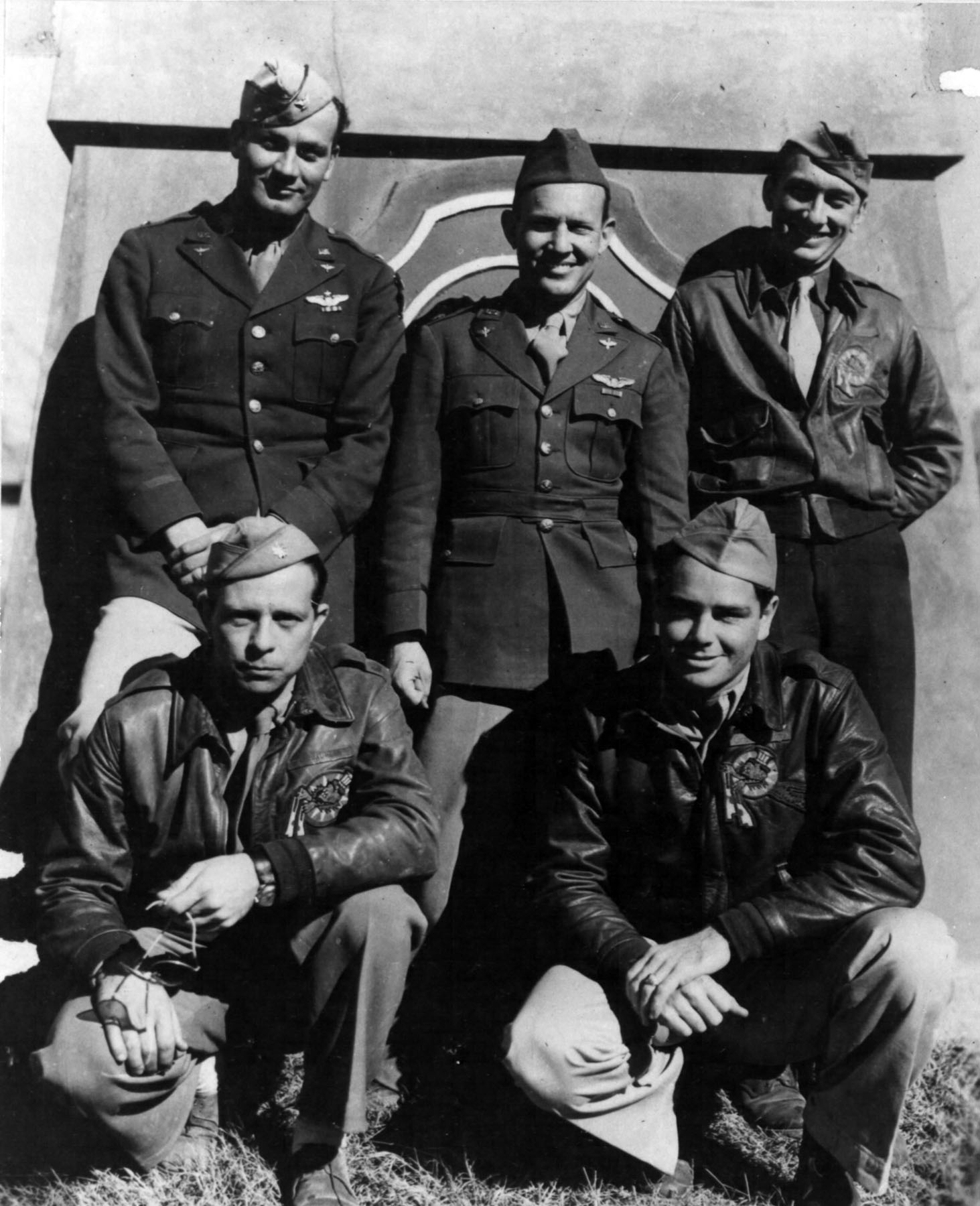
The "Zero Club": Five of Chennault's top fighter pilots. Standing: "Casey" Vincent, John R. Alison and Bruce K. Holloway. Foreground: Albert "Ajax" Baumler and Grattan "Grant" Mahony.

In early January 1943, Vincent was officially made executive officer of the CATF, taking over the multiple leadership roles held previously by Scott and by Merian C. Cooper, who were both heading home. He checked out in a C-53 transport, flew it to Chungking for a "short visit with Generalissimo Chiang Kai-shek", and was promoted to colonel. On January 24, Albert "Ajax" Baumler flew a captured and repaired Mitsubishi A6M Zero from Kweilin, and Vincent put it through its paces to become one of only five pilots in the "Zero Club"—China-based U.S. pilots who test-flew this particular aircraft. Starved of fuel and supplies in February, the CATF mounted few missions; during the same period, Commanding General of the USAAF Henry H. Arnold visited with Chennault and Vincent to inform them that a group of fuel-hungry heavy bombers were to be assigned to the CATF, under Colonel Royden Eugene Beebe, Jr.

=== Fourteenth Air Force ===
On March 10, 1943, the China Air Task Force became the Fourteenth Air Force, and Vincent was made chief of staff. He prevailed upon Chennault to let him take a fighter squadron deeper into enemy territory via advance bases where the fliers would stop to refuel and re-arm. In May 1943, a forward echelon commanded by Vincent with Tex Hill as vice commander was flown out of bases in east China, along the Hengyang–Kweilin line. This bold thrust into enemy-held territory put all major Japanese airbases from north China to Indochina and Thailand under threat of U.S. air attack. Flying Peggy II, a new P-40K he received on June 2, Vincent racked up four more aerial victories, making him an ace, then number six on August 26, 1943. For this, he was awarded the Distinguished Flying Cross and the Legion of Merit; the latter "for outstanding leadership of a small force, which, against numerically superior air strength, succeeded in disrupting enemy communications and routing troop columns." Chennault forbade him from any further combat missions.

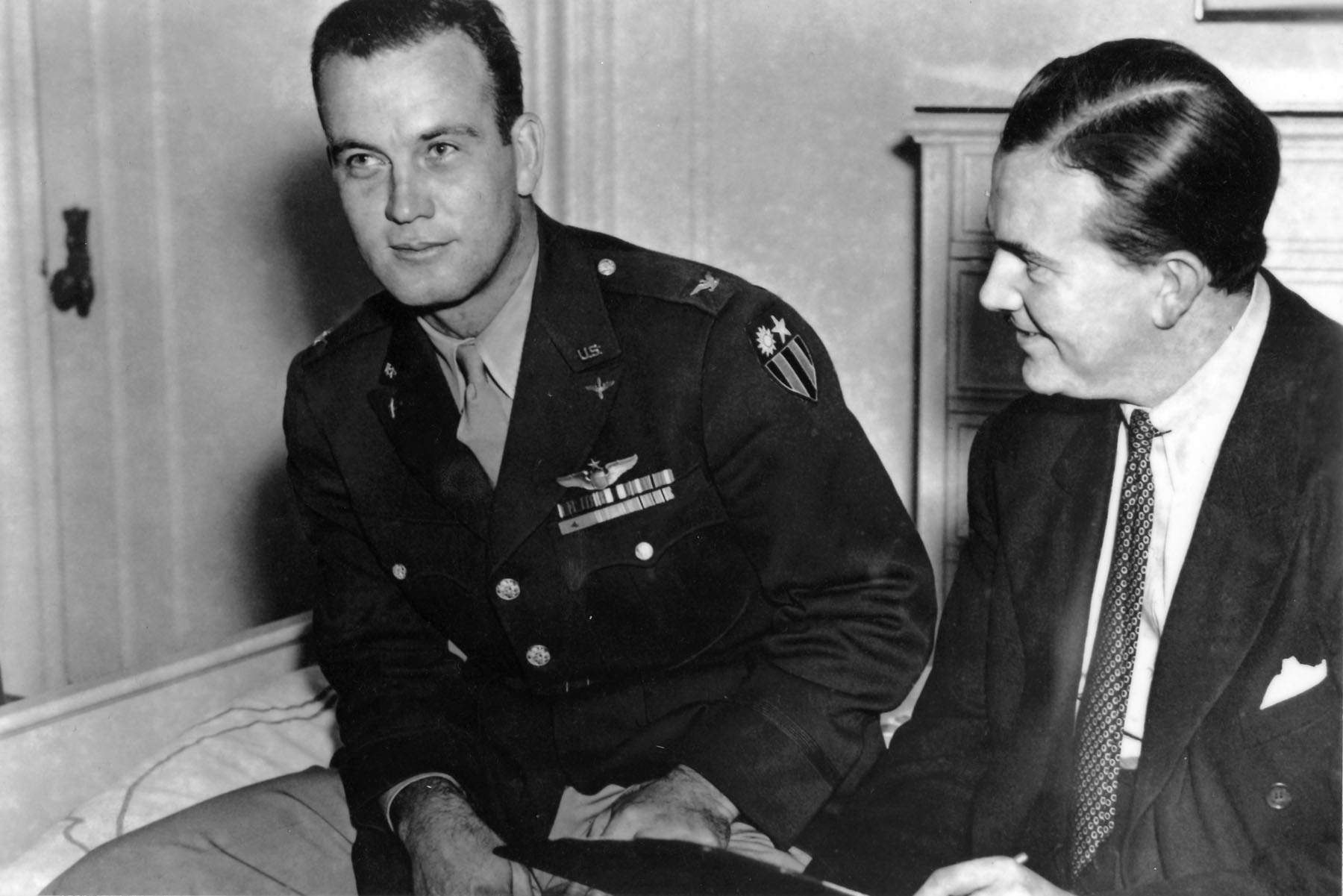
Colonel "Casey" Vincent meets with cartoonist Milton Caniff in 1943.

Meanwhile, back home in San Antonio, Texas, in early 1943, Peggy Vincent wrote to cartoonist Milton Caniff to tell him that her husband was working under Chennault in China, much like the characters in Caniff's comic strip Terry and the Pirates. Peggy Vincent sent Caniff photographs of her husband and told the cartoonist about his flying exploits. Caniff worked the flier into his comic strip as "Colonel Vince Casey" around March 1943. In September and October 1943, Vincent was rotated back home on leave during which he met Caniff. Nine months after the visit, a second daughter was born to the Vincents, named Patricia.

Upon his return to CBI, Vincent was informed that reconnaissance flights over Formosa (Taiwan) showed a growing concentration of Japanese aircraft. To Vincent, they appeared vulnerable to attack from advance bases, so he and Hill planned a long-range mission. On Thanksgiving Day, November 25, 1943, Vincent sent Hill in command of a mixed force of eight early Allison-engined P-51 Mustangs, eight P-38 Lightnings and fourteen B-25 Mitchells against 100 bombers and 112 fighters at Hsinchu Air Base—the attackers destroyed 15 of 20 defending fighters as well as 27 enemy bombers on the ground without loss to themselves. Four days later flying escort to B-24 Liberator heavy bombers, Vincent led the 23d Fighter Group against Tien Ho airdrome at Canton—the group shot down 13 of 20 defending fighters.

The Formosa attack was one of the most devastating in the CBI Theater—it catalyzed the Japanese to lay plans to invade and seize the advance airfields Vincent had developed in east China. These plans became one of the two primary goals of Operation Ichi-Go, Japan's 1944 invasion of east China.

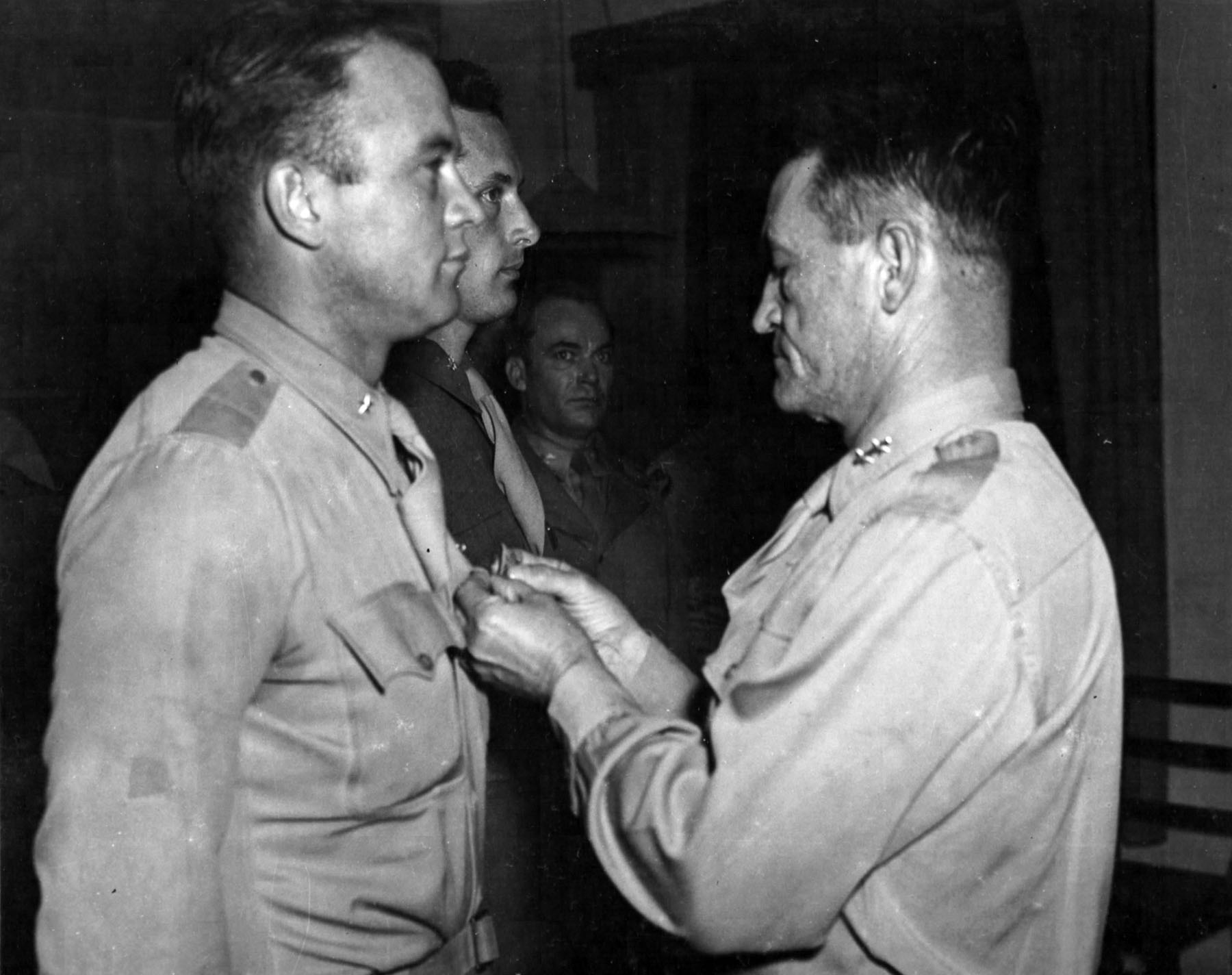
Vincent receives from Major General Claire Chennault the oak leaf cluster to his Air Medal in December 1944.

As an expansion of the 14th Air Force Forward Echelon, the 68th Composite Wing was formed in December 1943. Vincent commanded the 68th for its first year. The mixed unit was composed of fighters, fighter bombers and medium bombers, flown by both American and Chinese airmen. Vincent flew a B-25 Mitchell bomber to lead his men in some of the bombing raids. More than 500,000 tons of Japanese shipping were sunk by Vincent's airmen, and the Japanese air power was greatly reduced south of the Yangtze River. On June 2, 1944, Vincent was promoted to temporary brigadier general, the second youngest general officer in the USAAF. It had taken him only seven years to rise from second lieutenant to general. An article about the meteoric rise of young military officers was printed in Time on June 19, 1944. Among other officers mentioned, Vincent was described as 6 feet (1.8 m) tall, 175 pounds (80 kg), a six-kill ace and the prototype for the cartoon character Vince Casey. Of Vincent, Caniff said that he "picked his brain" about living and fighting conditions in China.

Vincent commanded the 68th Composite Group with Tex Hill as his deputy during the whole of the Japanese Operation Ichi-Go of 1944. The Americans in their advance bases were thrown on the defensive. In late June, Vincent ordered the evacuation of the base built at Hengyang, destroying it with explosives so that the Japanese could not make use of the buildings or the airstrip. Directly afterward, Vincent was called to attend a formal dinner with American and Chinese generals and ambassadors, honoring Vice President Henry A. Wallace who was on a fact-finding mission. Meeting after dinner in his office, Vincent told Wallace "the unvarnished truth—that, barring a miracle, the Japanese will have all of east China by July 15!"

Japanese supply problems in east China were as critical as American ones, and the Japanese advance was slowed until September when Vincent was forced to retreat and destroy his advance base at Tanchuk. The same treatment befell his own headquarters at Kweilin in October. As he circled Kweilin one final time in his command B-25, he said to Time magazine writer Theodore H. White (who was evacuating as well), "I'm going to write a book about this campaign. I'm going to call it Fire and Fall Back." A month later, Vincent's HQ, relocated to Liuchow, was abandoned, with the 68th retreating to the 14th Air Force stronghold at Kunming. On December 13, 1944, both Hill and Vincent completed their tours of duty and left China, Vincent to command the 30th Training Wing at Turner Field in Georgia.

== Postwar career ==
In 1946, Vincent reverted to the permanent rank of captain and began teaching at the Air War College. During this time, the United States Air Force (USAF) was formed from the USAAF. From 1949 to 1955, Vincent rose in rank, reaching temporary brigadier general once again in 1951. A son was born to him, named Clinton D. Vincent, Jr., nicknamed Casey Junior.

In 1951 Caniff, who had started a comic strip titled Steve Canyon four years earlier, used Vincent as a model for a new character, this time making him the youthful "Brigadier General P.G. 'Shanty' Town". Caniff made General Town into a hard-working peacetime general, concerned with the defense of America.

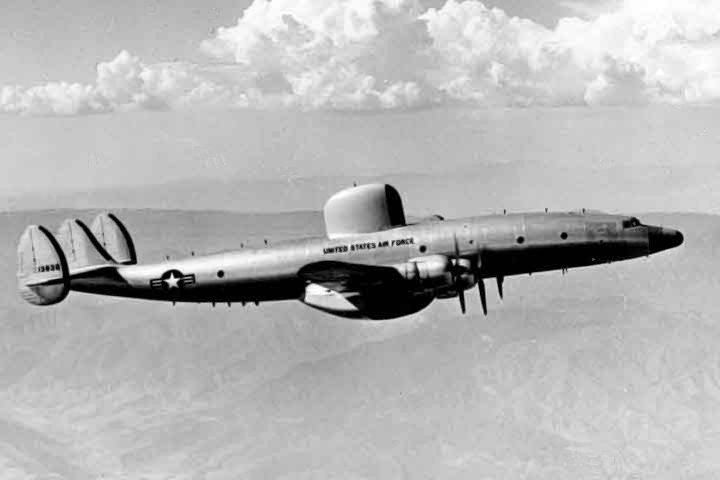
The first EC-121 Warning Star radar search aircraft

In 1953, Vincent was placed second in command under Major General Walter E. Todd, Commander Western Air Defense Force. Todd's station was at Hamilton Air Force Base near San Francisco. As Vice Commander, Vincent took an active role in defense developments such as the EC-121 Warning Star, a large radar-equipped aircraft that held a rotating crew of 31 for extended flights, used to detect the approach of enemy aircraft and to coordinate fighter interception. Vincent held the position until mid-1955.

== Death and legacy ==
In 1955, Vincent was ordered to Ent Air Force Base in Colorado Springs, Colorado where he was to serve as deputy chief of staff for operations of the Continental Air Command. On July 5 at the age of 40, after one full day at his new post, Vincent went to bed at his residence on the air base and died of a heart attack in his sleep. His wife, three daughters and one son were still at their residence on Hamilton AFB in California, preparing to move, when they received word. Vincent was interred at Fort Sam Houston National Cemetery on July 11, 1955. Caniff responded to the tragic news by having his character General Town die from overwork.

On September 1, 1956, Yuma Air Force Base was renamed Vincent Air Force Base in Vincent's honor. A plaque commemorating the event was unveiled by Vincent's widow, Peggy Vincent, at a ceremony held on October 12.

In 1975, Vincent's war diaries were made into a book: Fire and Fall Back: the World War Two "CBI" story of "Casey" Vincent, compiled and edited by author Glenn E. McClure. "Tex" Hill said of Vincent and the diaries "He was strong, smart—just one hell of a good man. He was never recognized for what he did. He handled it well in China. But you could tell in his diary that he felt like he'd been left hanging."

== Awards and decorations ==

Command Pilot
Army Distinguished Service Medal		Silver Star
Legion of Merit	Distinguished Flying Cross w/ 2 bronze oak leaf clusters	Purple Heart
Air Medal w/ 3 bronze oak leaf clusters	Army Commendation Medal w/ 1 bronze oak leaf cluster	Air Force Presidential Unit Citation
American Defense Service Medal w/ 1 service star	American Campaign Medal	Asiatic-Pacific Campaign Medal w/ 1 silver and 1 bronze campaign stars
World War II Victory Medal	National Defense Service Medal	Air Force Longevity Service Award w/ three bronze oak leaf clusters
Honorary Knight Grand Cross of the Order of the British Empire (United Kingdom)	Unidentified decoration	China War Memorial Medal (Republic of China)
