= Weimar, Texas =

- City
- Location of Weimar, Texas
- Coordinates: 29°42′8″N 96°46′48″W
- Country: United States
- State: Texas
- County: Colorado

Government
  - Mayor: Tucker Carlton
  - City Manager: Richard Whitten

Area
  - Total: 2.31 sq mi (5.99 km^{2})
  - Land: 2.31 sq mi (5.99 km^{2})
  - Water: 0.0039 sq mi (0.01 km^{2})
- Elevation: 410 ft (125 m)

Population (2020)
  - Total: 2,076
  - Density: 962.9/sq mi (371.77/km^{2})
- Time zone: UTC-6 (Central (CST))
  - Summer (DST): UTC-5 (CDT)
- ZIP code: 78962
- Area code: 979
- FIPS code: 48-77020
- GNIS feature ID: 1349609
- Website: weimartx.gov

Weimar (/ˈwaɪmər/ or, by many non-locals, /ˈwiːmər/) is a city in Colorado County, Texas, United States. The population was 2,076 at the 2020 census. It is part of the Texas-German belt region and was founded and named by German emigrants after the city of Weimar, Germany.

In 1873, the town was founded in anticipation that the Galveston, Harrisburg, & San Antonio Railroad was going to build through the site. It was originally named "Jackson" after D.W. Jackson, a native Georgian and landowner, but subsequently was called "Weimar" in tribute to the German city of Weimar.

Located on Interstate 10 and US 90 between San Antonio, Austin, and Houston, Weimar is a small community of predominantly Czech and German descendants.

== History ==
Weimar was founded in 1873 in anticipation that the Galveston, Harrisburg and San Antonio Railway was going to build through the site. The community was first called "Jackson", after D. W. Jackson, a native Georgian and area landowner who donated land for the railroad right-of-way and the townsite. The populace subsequently chose the name "Weimar"; an early record states that Thomas W. Pierce, who authorized Jackson to sell lots at the site, had visited Weimar, Germany, and was favorably impressed.

The Weimar post office was established in 1873. The town was incorporated in 1875. After beginning with a few hundred townspeople, Weimar had by its tenth birthday achieved a population over 1,000. As it grew, Weimar established itself as a center of trade for pecans, poultry, and dairy products. By 1877, the town was large enough to make its first city map. In 1888, Weimar witnessed the origin of the first town newspaper, The Weimar Mercury, which currently remains in publication.

A strong history of baseball exists in Weimar. Veterans Park (Strickland Field) was ahead of its time when it was built in 1948, and was the first lighted baseball field between San Antonio and Houston. Veterans Park remains a state-of-the-art baseball stadium, having hosted a Babe Ruth League World Series Tournament in 2005.

Weimar is where Norman J. Sirnic and Karen Sirnic were murdered by serial killer Angel Maturino Resendiz on May 2, 1999. Their parsonage was adjacent to the train tracks.

Throughout the 20th century, Weimar enjoyed a slow yet steady growth in population, increasing on average by 250 persons every ten years. Business establishments held their numbers steady at around 70. After a high population of 2,400 in 1976, the town declined slightly in the following decade. In 1980, the population was 2,128. In 1990, the population of Weimar was 2,052, and in 2000, it was 1,981. By 2010, the population had rebounded to 2,151.

== Geography ==
Weimar is located in western Colorado County at 29°42′8″N 96°46′48″W (29.702348, –96.779950). According to the United States Census Bureau, the city has a total area of 2.3 square miles (6.0 km^{2}), all land.

U.S. Route 90 passes through the center of town as Main Street, while Interstate 10 passes through the southern edge of the city, with access from Exit 682. Via either highway it is 15 miles (24 km) east to Columbus, the county seat. Downtown Houston is 88 miles (142 km) to the east, and downtown San Antonio is 109 miles (175 km) to the west.

== Demographics ==
Historical population
Census	Pop.	Note	%±
1880	626		—
1890	1,443		130.5%
1900	1,337		−7.3%
1910	906		−32.2%
1920	1,171		29.2%
1930	1,256		7.3%
1940	1,353		7.7%
1950	1,663		22.9%
1960	2,006		20.6%
1970	2,104		4.9%
1980	2,128		1.1%
1990	2,052		−3.6%
2000	1,981		−3.5%
2010	2,151		8.6%
2020	2,076		−3.5%
U.S. Decennial Census

=== 2020 census ===
As of the 2020 census, Weimar had a population of 2,076. The median age was 40.9 years. 23.8% of residents were under the age of 18 and 20.9% of residents were 65 years of age or older. For every 100 females there were 92.0 males, and for every 100 females age 18 and over there were 86.0 males age 18 and over.

0.0% of residents lived in urban areas, while 100.0% lived in rural areas.

There were 824 households in Weimar, of which 35.6% had children under the age of 18 living in them. Of all households, 47.3% were married-couple households, 15.8% were households with a male householder and no spouse or partner present, and 31.7% were households with a female householder and no spouse or partner present. About 30.1% of all households were made up of individuals and 16.9% had someone living alone who was 65 years of age or older.

There were 960 housing units, of which 14.2% were vacant. The homeowner vacancy rate was 2.8% and the rental vacancy rate was 10.9%.

Racial composition as of the 2020 census
Race	Number	Percent
White	1,206	58.1%
Black or African American	358	17.2%
American Indian and Alaska Native	16	0.8%
Asian	7	0.3%
Native Hawaiian and Other Pacific Islander	0	0.0%
Some other race	237	11.4%
Two or more races	252	12.1%
Hispanic or Latino (of any race)	594	28.6%

=== 2000 census ===
As of the census of 2000, 1,981 people, 817 households, and 522 families resided in the city. The population density was 877.2 inhabitants per square mile (338.7/km^{2}). The 940 housing units averaged 416.3 per square mile (160.6/km^{2}). The racial makeup of the city was 67.95% White, 21.76% African American, 0.15% Native American, 0.91% Asian, 7.67% from other races, and 1.56% from two or more races. Hispanics or Latinos of any race were 14.74% of the population.

Of the 817 households, 27.2% had children under the age of 18 living with them, 47.6% were married couples living together, 13.3% had a female householder with no husband present, and 36.0% were not families. About 33.7% of all households were made up of individuals, and 20.7% had someone living alone who was 65 years of age or older. The average household size was 2.34 and the average family size was 2.99.

In the city, the population was distributed as 24.5% under the age of 18, 6.1% from 18 to 24, 22.3% from 25 to 44, 22.7% from 45 to 64, and 24.4% who were 65 years of age or older. The median age was 42 years. For every 100 females, there were 83.4 males. For every 100 females age 18 and over, there were 77.8 males.

The median income for a household in the city was $27,667, and for a family was $42,143. Males had a median income of $31,477 versus $16,757 for females. The per capita income for the city was $16,272. About 9.0% of families and 13.2% of the population were below the poverty line, including 22.0% of those under age 18 and 14.5% of those age 65 or over.

== Economy ==
Local industries include meat processing, tooling and sheet-metal works, and manufacturing of gaskets. Agriculture continues to play an important role, as Weimar continues to trade in feed grain, poultry, corn, pecans, and beef. The former GH&SA railroad remains in service today as part of the Union Pacific Railroad system.

== Education ==
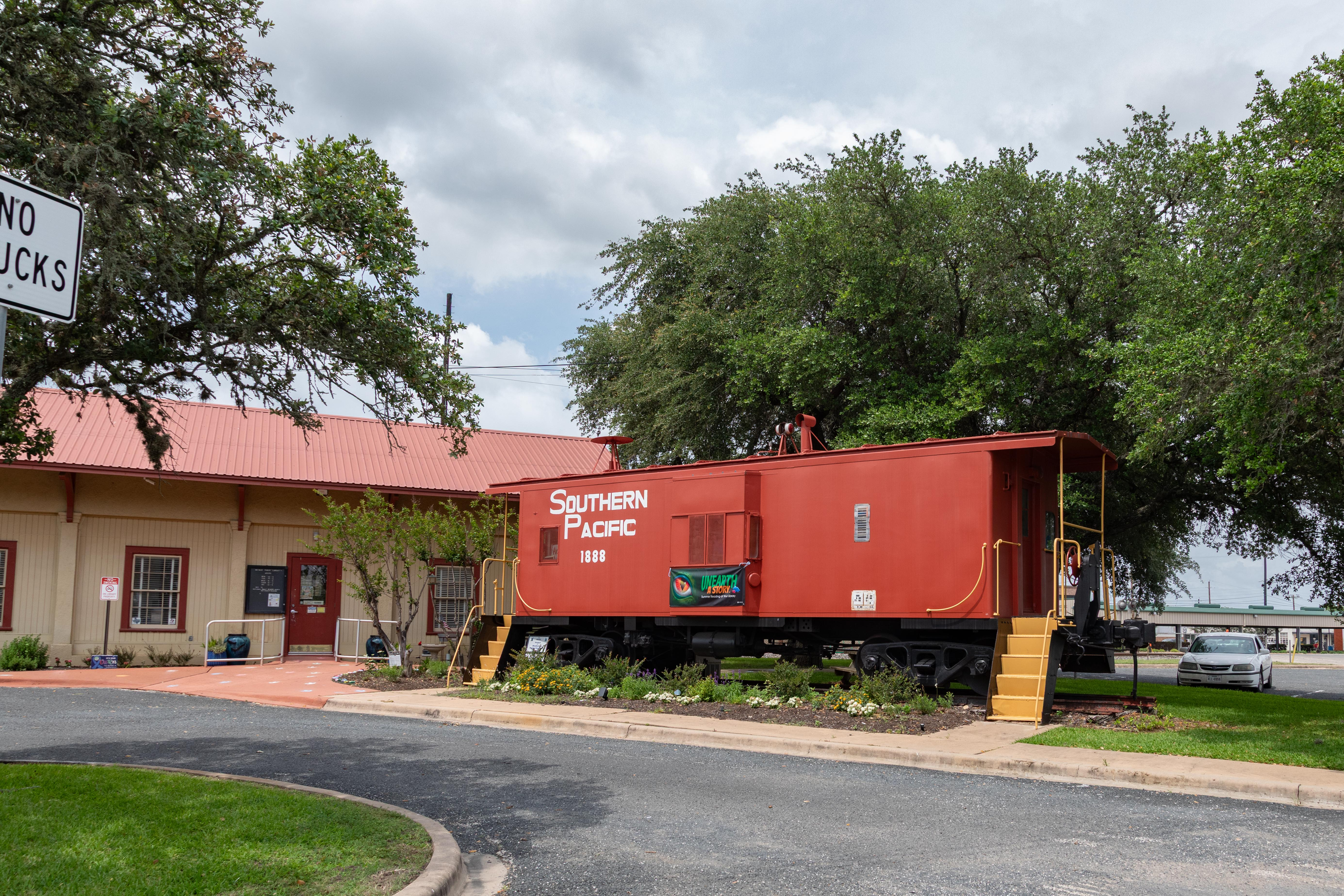
A Southern Pacific caboose on display outside of the Weimar Public Library, which is housed in the former Southern Pacific depot.

The city is served by the Weimar Independent School District, which consists of a kindergarten, an elementary school, a junior high school, and a high school.

Additionally, a private Catholic school, St. Michael's of the Roman Catholic Diocese of Victoria in Texas, offers education for students from kindergarten through junior high.

The designated community college for Weimar ISD is Wharton County Junior College.
