= Gail, Texas =

Census-designated place in Borden County, Texas, United States

- Census-designated place
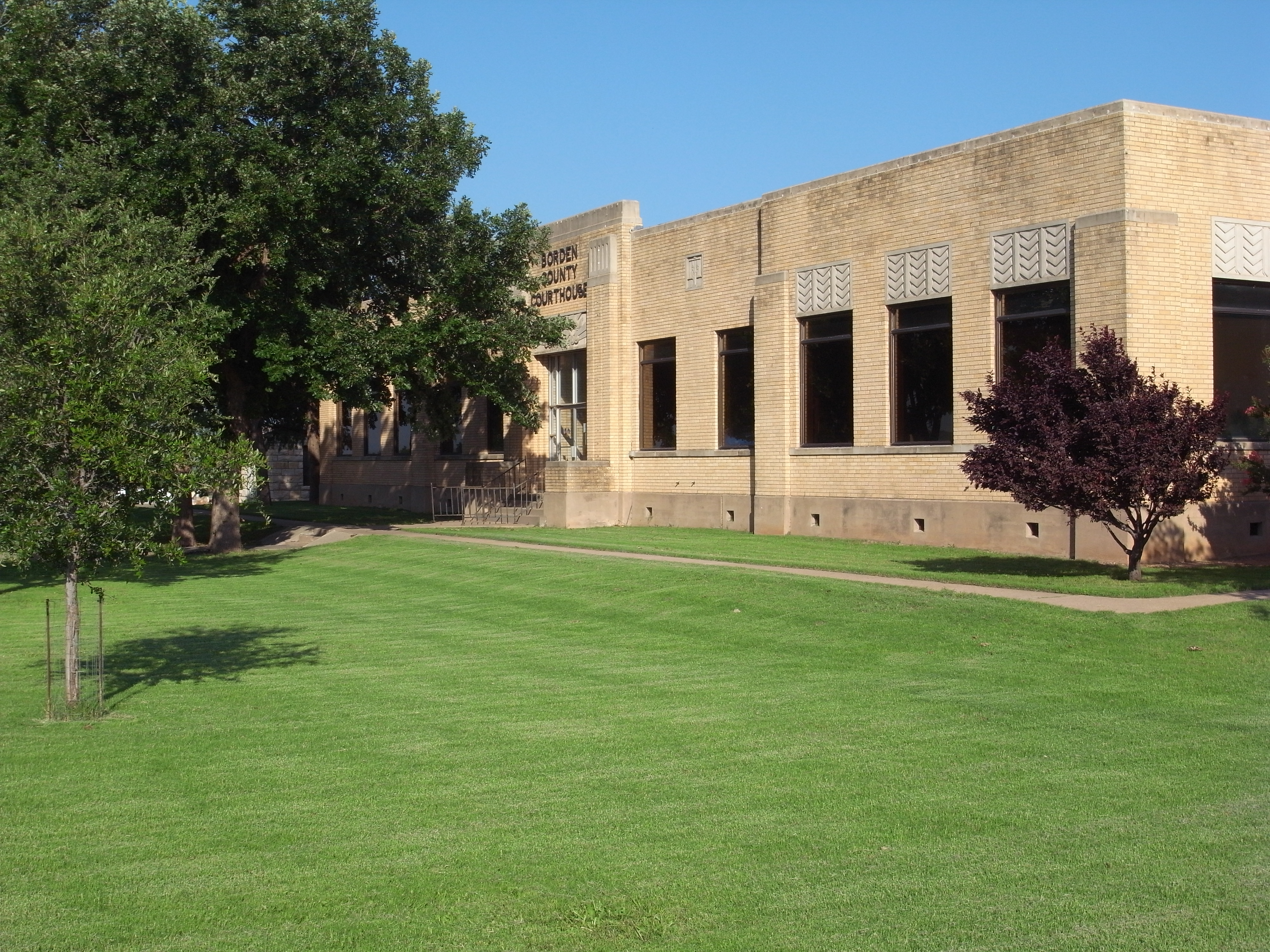
- Borden County Courthouse in Gail

- Location within Texas Location within the United States
- Coordinates: 32°46′13″N 101°26′43″W
- Country: United States
- State: Texas
- County: Borden

Area
  - Total: 2.02 sq mi (5.23 km^{2})
  - Land: 2.01 sq mi (5.21 km^{2})
  - Water: 0.0077 sq mi (0.02 km^{2})
- Elevation: 2,556 ft (779 m)

Population (2020)
  - Total: 249
  - Density: 124/sq mi (47.8/km^{2})
- Time zone: UTC-6 (Central (CST))
  - Summer (DST): UTC-5 (CDT)
- ZIP codes: 79738
- Area code: 806

Gail is a census-designated place in and the county seat of Borden County, Texas, United States, that is located at the junction of U.S. Route 180 and Farm to Market Road 669. As of the 2020 census, Gail had a population of 249.

The town and county are named for Gail Borden, Jr., the inventor of condensed milk.

Gail Mountain is located on the southwestern edge of town. The 20th annual Christmas lighting of the star atop Gail Mountain was held on November 29, 2013.

Mushaway Peak, a small but conspicuous butte, is located 4 miles (6 km) southeast.

== History ==
Founded in 1891 to coincide with the organization of Borden County, Gail has served as county seat for the duration of its existence. Borden County had remained quite sparsely populated until 1903, when the locally famed "War of Ribbons", inspired by a state-sanctioned land grab, took place. The conflict took its name from the practice of established ranchers displaying their affiliation and identity by way of a blue ribbon on their sleeves, whereas new settlers to the area designated theirs with a similarly placed red ribbon. By 1910, Gail was home to more than 700 residents, and though this would decline to 600 by 1912, the community remained the economic and administrative hub of Borden County. Changes in agricultural practices and patterns, coupled with the impact of the Great Depression, hindered the town and county's prosperity. By 1936, Gail's population had dwindled to 250 residents, and by 1980, it had fallen to approximately 190. The census of 2010 counted 231 residents in Gail.

The Borden County Jail opened in 1896. Built at a cost of $4,500 by the Diebold Safe and Lock Company, it had 2-foot-thick (0.61 m) outside walls made of stone from Gail Mountain, and 0.3-foot (0.091 m) hardened steel plates in the cell walls and floor. In 1956, two prisoners objected to Sheriff Sid Reeder's attempt to place them into one of the jail's cells when they noticed a rattlesnake sleeping inside. A historic marker was placed outside the jail in 1967.

John R. "Rich" Anderson, owner of the 64,000-acre (26,000 ha) Muleshoe Ranch near Gail, won the 1992 National Cattleman's Association Environmental Stewardship Award. His achievement was also recognized by the Texas House of Representatives.

== Geography ==
Gail is located near the center of Borden County. U.S. Route 180 passes through the town, leading east 31 miles (50 km) to Snyder and west 31 miles to Lamesa. Big Spring along FM 669 is 40 miles (64 km) to the south, and Lubbock is 72 miles (116 km) to the north.

According to the U.S. Census Bureau, Gail has an area of 2.0 square miles (5.2 km^{2}), of which 0.008 square miles (0.02 km^{2}), or 0.38%, is covered by water.

=== Climate ===
This climate type occurs primarily on the periphery of the true deserts in low-latitude semiarid steppe regions. The Köppen climate classification subtype for this climate is BSk (tropical and subtropical steppe climate).

Climate data for Gail, Texas, 1991–2020 normals, extremes 1912–present
Month	Jan	Feb	Mar	Apr	May	Jun	Jul	Aug	Sep	Oct	Nov	Dec	Year
Record high °F (°C)	87 (31)	92 (33)	98 (37)	104 (40)	111 (44)	116 (47)	113 (45)	112 (44)	106 (41)	103 (39)	91 (33)	85 (29)	116 (47)
Mean maximum °F (°C)	78.1 (25.6)	82.0 (27.8)	88.5 (31.4)	93.9 (34.4)	99.9 (37.7)	102.7 (39.3)	102.5 (39.2)	101.7 (38.7)	97.3 (36.3)	92.4 (33.6)	82.9 (28.3)	76.8 (24.9)	105.7 (40.9)
Mean daily maximum °F (°C)	57.1 (13.9)	62.0 (16.7)	70.1 (21.2)	78.8 (26.0)	85.6 (29.8)	91.4 (33.0)	93.6 (34.2)	92.9 (33.8)	85.5 (29.7)	77.2 (25.1)	65.7 (18.7)	57.4 (14.1)	76.4 (24.7)
Daily mean °F (°C)	44.6 (7.0)	48.8 (9.3)	56.4 (13.6)	64.4 (18.0)	72.7 (22.6)	79.3 (26.3)	81.9 (27.7)	81.2 (27.3)	73.9 (23.3)	64.3 (17.9)	53.1 (11.7)	45.3 (7.4)	63.8 (17.7)
Mean daily minimum °F (°C)	32.2 (0.1)	35.6 (2.0)	42.6 (5.9)	50.0 (10.0)	59.7 (15.4)	67.3 (19.6)	70.2 (21.2)	69.6 (20.9)	62.3 (16.8)	51.5 (10.8)	40.5 (4.7)	33.3 (0.7)	51.2 (10.7)
Mean minimum °F (°C)	16.4 (−8.7)	19.4 (−7.0)	24.8 (−4.0)	33.8 (1.0)	44.1 (6.7)	58.3 (14.6)	63.2 (17.3)	62.7 (17.1)	49.1 (9.5)	35.0 (1.7)	24.4 (−4.2)	17.3 (−8.2)	12.1 (−11.1)
Record low °F (°C)	2 (−17)	0 (−18)	9 (−13)	24 (−4)	33 (1)	45 (7)	57 (14)	52 (11)	36 (2)	20 (−7)	8 (−13)	−1 (−18)	−1 (−18)
Average precipitation inches (mm)	0.55 (14)	0.69 (18)	1.08 (27)	1.36 (35)	2.52 (64)	2.39 (61)	2.00 (51)	2.69 (68)	2.54 (65)	1.78 (45)	1.26 (32)	0.59 (15)	19.45 (495)
Average snowfall inches (cm)	0.2 (0.51)	0.2 (0.51)	0.0 (0.0)	0.0 (0.0)	0.0 (0.0)	0.0 (0.0)	0.0 (0.0)	0.0 (0.0)	0.0 (0.0)	0.0 (0.0)	0.0 (0.0)	0.9 (2.3)	1.3 (3.32)
Average precipitation days (≥ 0.01 in)	2.0	2.2	2.5	2.9	4.9	4.9	3.6	3.8	4.0	2.7	1.8	1.7	37.0
Average snowy days (≥ 0.1 in)	0.0	0.2	0.0	0.0	0.0	0.0	0.0	0.0	0.0	0.0	0.0	0.3	0.5
Source 1: NOAA
Source 2: National Weather Service

== Demographics ==
Historical population
Census	Pop.	Note	%±
2010	231		—
2020	249		7.8%
U.S. Decennial Census; 1850–1900 1910; 1920 1930 1940; 1950 1960 1970; 1980 1990 2000; 2010 2020

Gail first appeared as a census designated place in the 2010 U.S. census.

=== 2020 census ===
Gail CDP, Texas – Racial and ethnic composition Note: the US Census treats Hispanic/Latino as an ethnic category. This table excludes Latinos from the racial categories and assigns them to a separate category. Hispanics/Latinos may be of any race.
Race / Ethnicity (NH = Non-Hispanic)	Pop 2010	Pop 2020	% 2010	% 2020
White alone (NH)	178	201	77.06%	80.72%
Black or African American alone (NH)	0	0	0.00%	0.00%
Native American or Alaska Native alone (NH)	2	0	0.87%	0.00%
Asian alone (NH)	1	0	0.43%	0.00%
Pacific Islander alone (NH)	0	0	0.00%	0.00%
Other race alone (NH)	0	0	0.00%	0.00%
Mixed race or Multiracial (NH)	1	4	0.43%	1.61%
Hispanic or Latino (any race)	49	44	21.21%	17.67%
Total	231	249	100.00%	100.00%

As of the 2020 United States census, there were 249 people, 38 households, and 24 families residing in the CDP.

== Education ==
Gail is served by the Borden County Independent School District, and is home to the Borden County High School Coyotes. The school's Coyote Stadium is a six-man football venue and can seat 350.

== Places of interest ==
- Borden County Courthouse - a 1939 one-story brick building with cast concrete detail
- Borden County Historical Museum

== Gallery ==
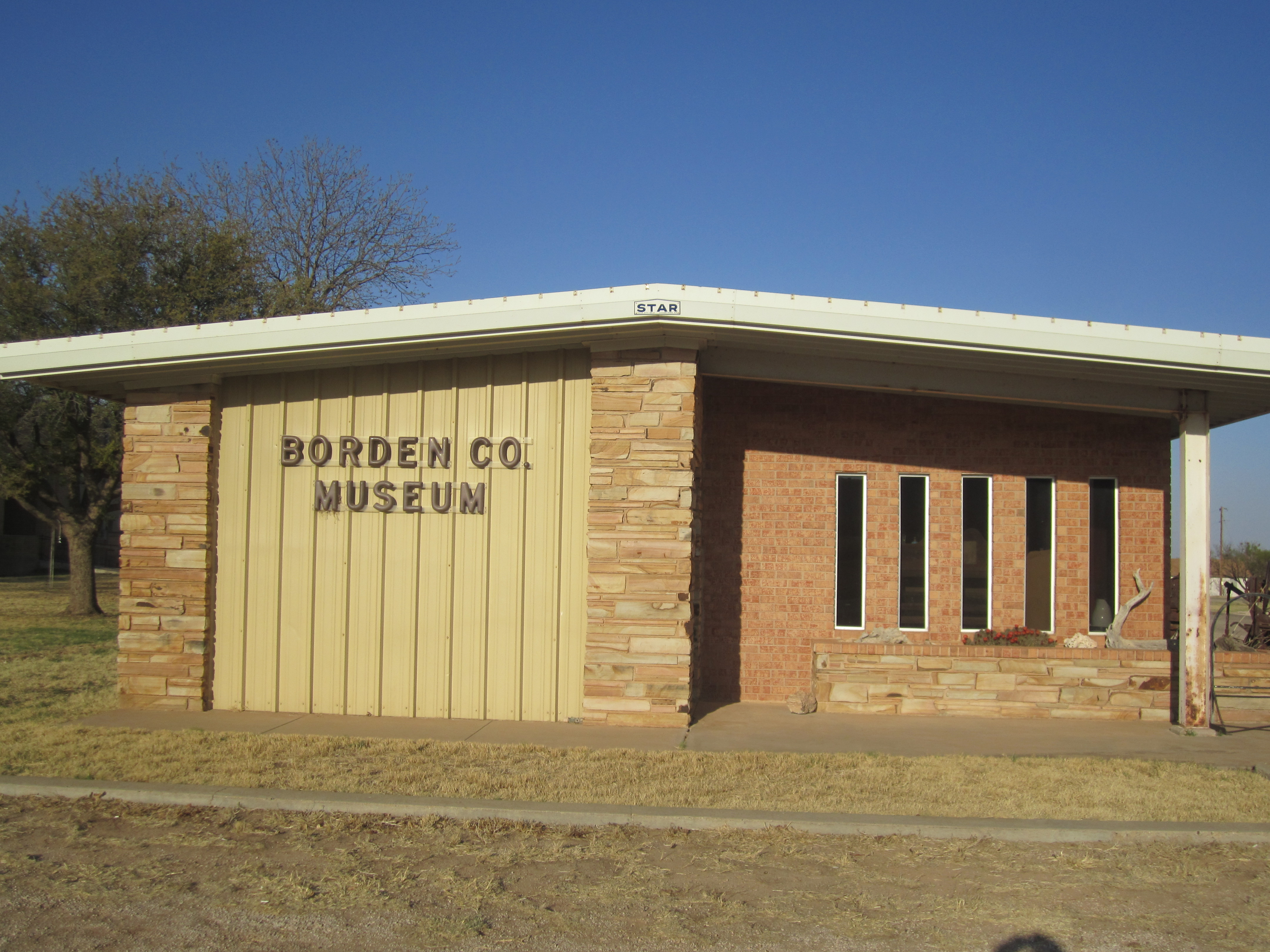
The Borden County Museum is located across from the post office, behind the county courthouse.

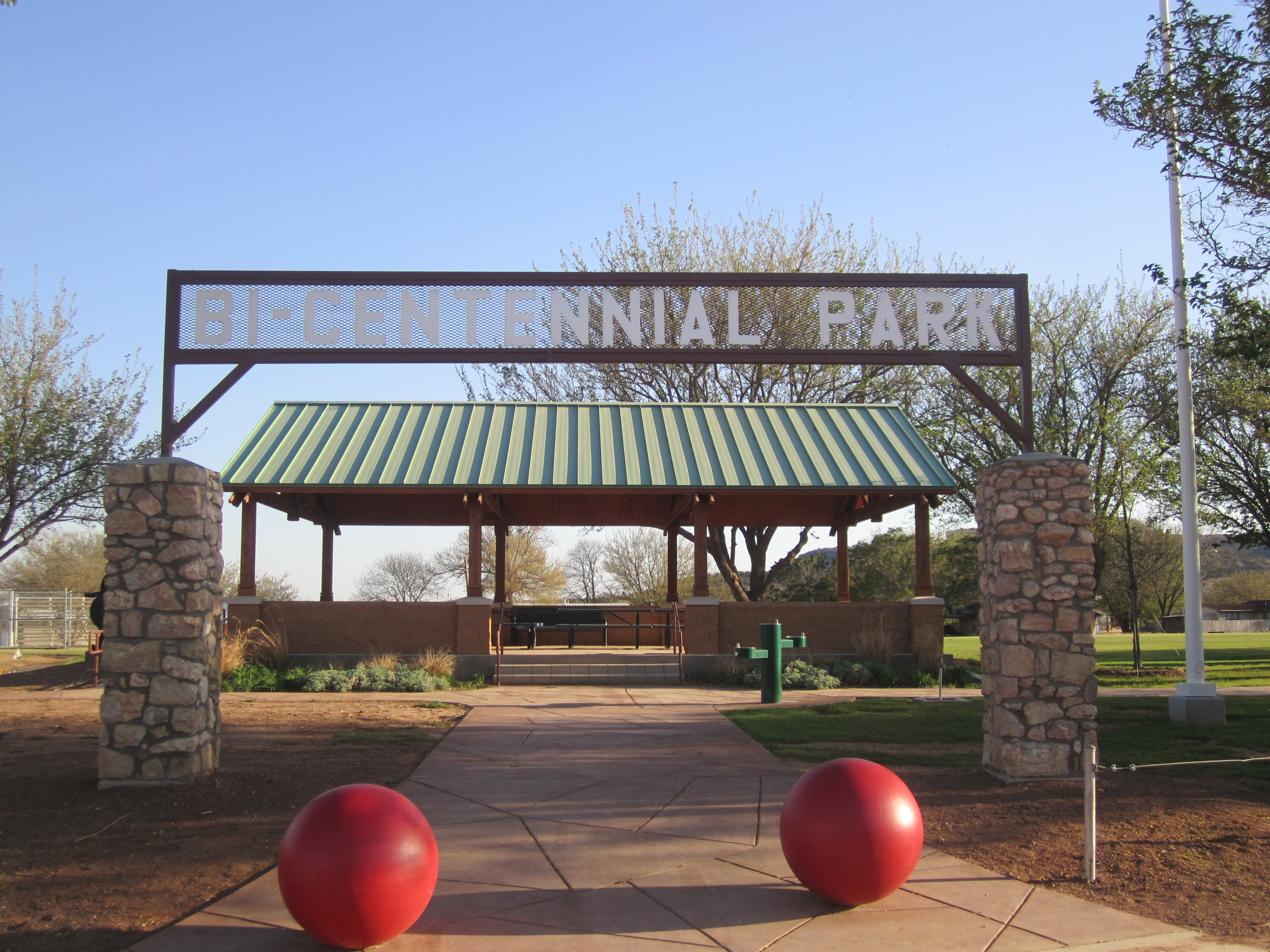
Entrance to Bicentennial Park, located across from the Borden County School

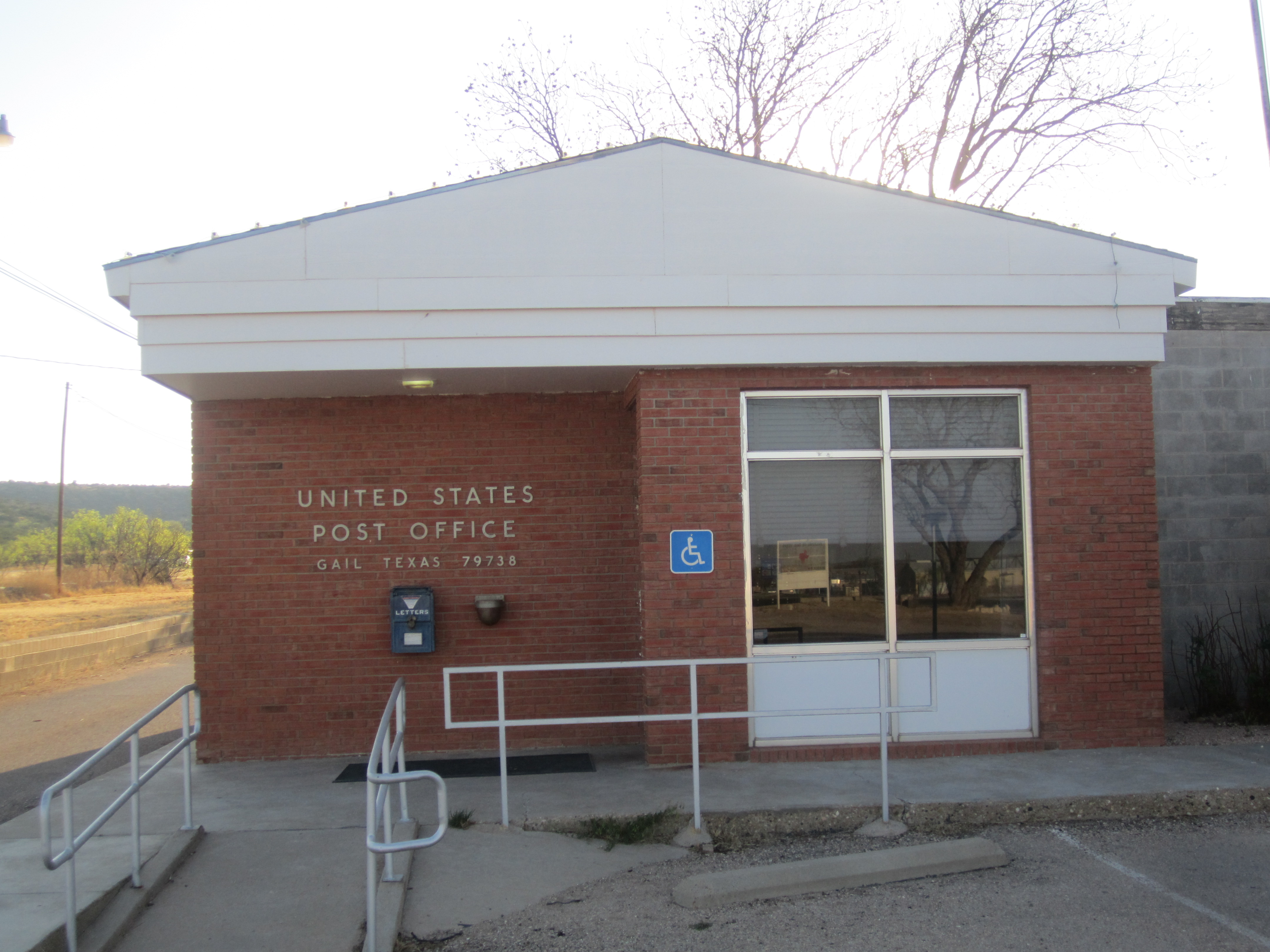
Post office

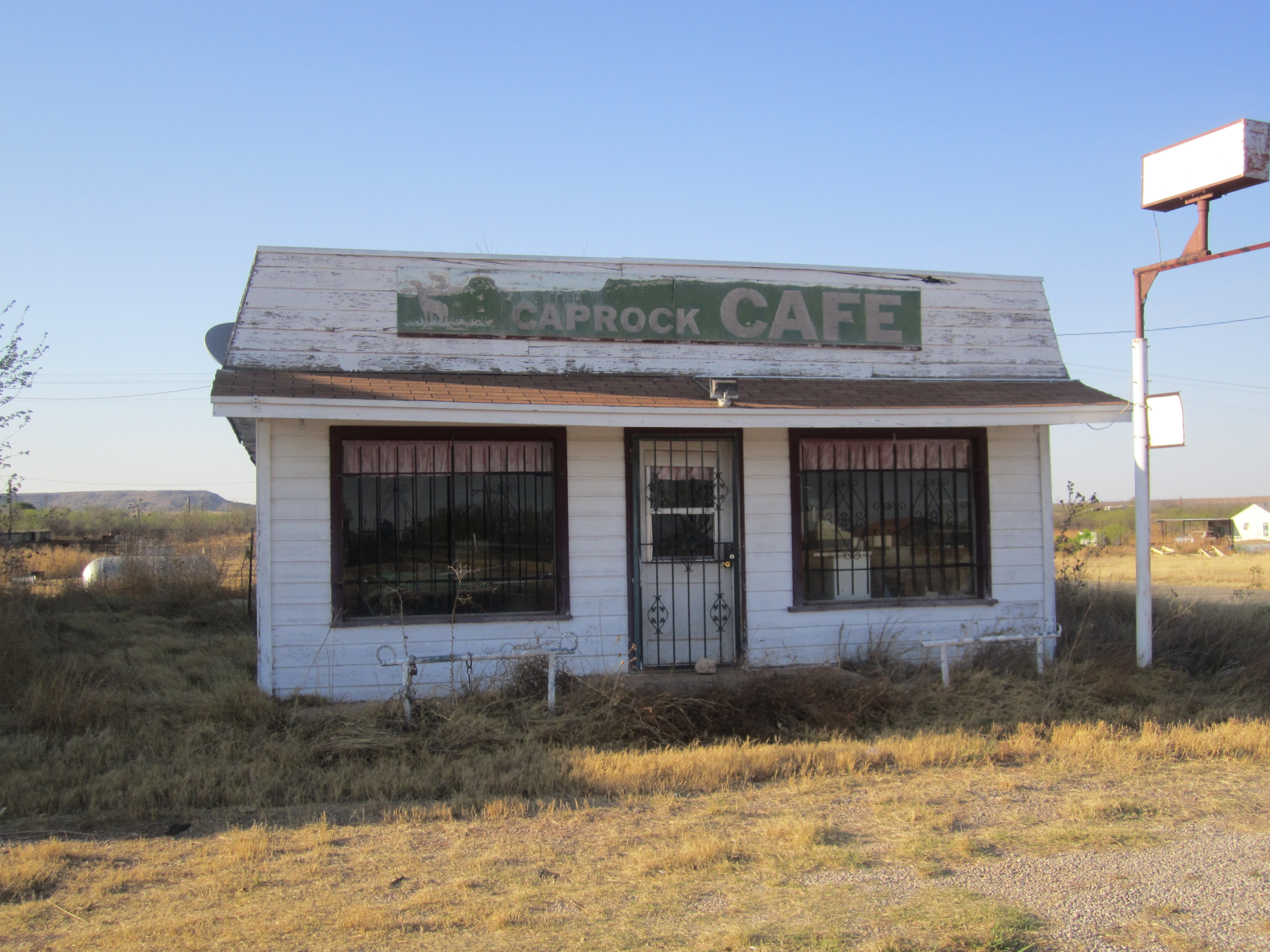
Caprock Cafe lies deserted across from the Borden County Courthouse.

== Notable person ==
- Clinton D. "Casey" Vincent, flying ace, second youngest general in U.S. Air Force history

== Trivia ==
Gail, Texas, is also the name given to a Census Designated Place which includes the town proper. The town is additionally the locus of the United States Postal Service's Zip Code of 79738.

== See also ==
- List of census-designated places in Texas
