= Borden County Independent School District =

School district in Texas

Location
- Gail, Texas ESC Region 17 United States
- Coordinates: 32°46′32″N 101°26′58″W

District information
- Type: Independent school district
- Grades: Pre-K through 12
- Superintendent: Jimmy Thomas Principal Steve Cates Vice Principal Kyle Kuehler
- Schools: 2 (2009-10)
- NCES District ID: 4810860

Students and staff
- Students: 227 (2010-11)
- Teachers: 19.96 (2009-10) (on full-time equivalent (FTE) basis)
- Student–teacher ratio: 11.12(2009-10)
- Athletic conference: UIL Class 1A 6-man Football Division I
- District mascot: Coyotes
- Colors: Red, Columbia Blue, White

Other information
- TEA District Accountability Rating for 2011-12: Exemplary
- Website: Borden County ISD

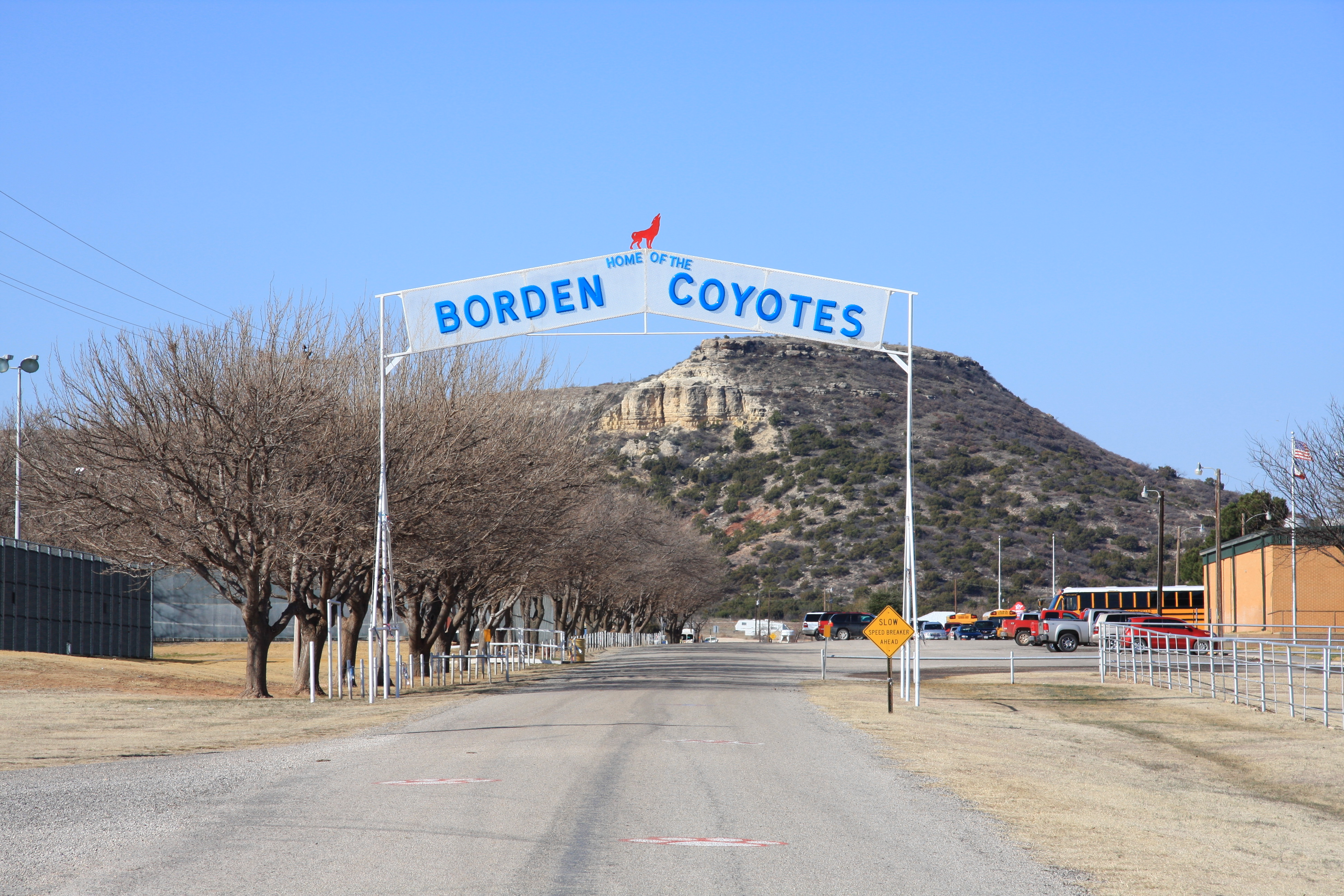
Borden County School, with Gail Mountain in the background

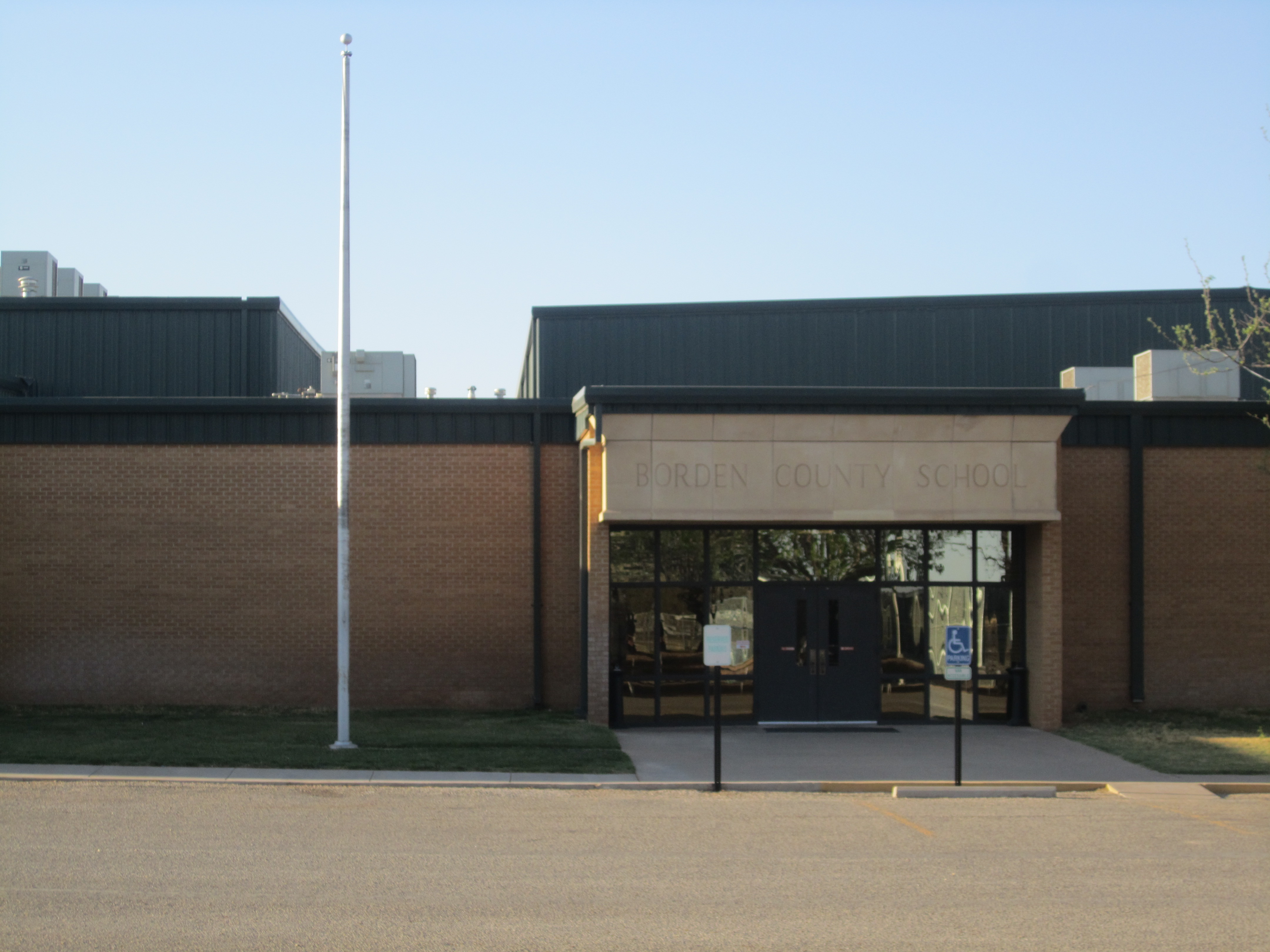
Borden County School is located across from Bicentennial Park in Gail, Texas.

Borden County Independent School District is a public school district based in the community of Gail, Texas, United States. The district serves all of Borden County with the exception of a small southwestern portion, which is served by the Sands Consolidated Independent School District. A small portion of Howard County lies within the district.

== Finances ==
As of the 2010-2011 school year, the appraised valuation of property in the district was $849,037,000. The maintenance tax rate was $0.104 and the bond tax rate was $0.028 per $100 of appraised valuation.

== Academic achievement ==
In 2011, the school district was rated "exemplary" by the Texas Education Agency. Five percent of districts in Texas in 2011 received the same rating. No state accountability ratings will be given to districts in 2012.

Historical district TEA accountability ratings

- 2011: exemplary
- 2010: exemplary
- 2009: exemplary
- 2008: recognized
- 2007: recognized
- 2006: recognized
- 2005: academically acceptable
- 2004: recognized

== Schools ==
In the 2011-2012 school year, the district had students in two schools.
Regular instructional

- Borden County School (Grades Pre-K-12)

Alternative instructional

- Lamesa DAEP (Grades 9-12)

== Special programs ==
=== UIL academics ===
- 2018 - Texas 1A Academic Meet State Champion
- 2019 - Texas 1A Academic Meet State Champion

=== Athletics ===
Borden County High School participates in the boys sports of baseball, basketball, football, and wrestling. The school participates in the girls sports of basketball and softball. Borden High School plays six-man football. For the 2012 through 2014 school years, Borden County High School will play football in UIL Class 1A 6-man Football Division I.

State football championships

- 1997 - Texas 1A 6-man state champions
- 1998 - Texas 1A 6-man state runners-up
- 2008 - Texas 1A Division II 6-man state champions
- 2009 - Texas 1A Division II 6-man state champions
- 2011 - Texas 1A Division I 6-man state runners-up
- 2016 - Texas 1A Division I 6-man state champions
- 2017 - Texas 1A Division I 6-man state champions

== Controversy ==
In July 2024, the ACLU of Texas sent Borden County Independent School District a letter, alleging that the district's 2023-2024 dress and grooming code appeared to violate the Texas Creating a Respectful and Open World for Natural Hair (or CROWN) Act, which prohibits racial discrimination based on hairstyles or hair texture, and asking the district to revise its policies for the 2024-2025 school year.

== See also ==
- List of school districts in Texas
- List of high schools in Texas
- Farm to Market Road 669
- Llano Estacado
- West Texas
