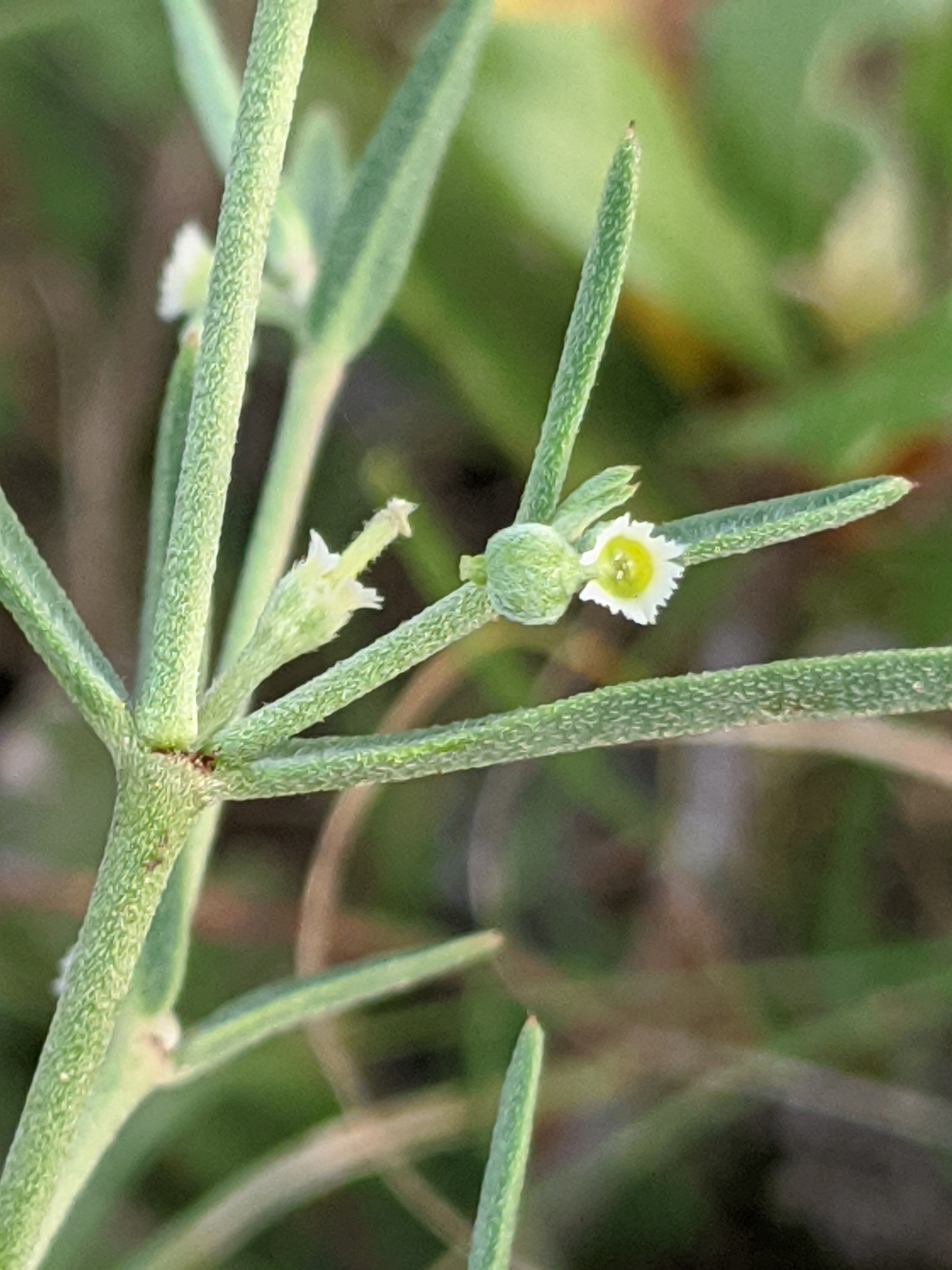

Scientific classification
- Kingdom: Plantae
- Clade: Tracheophytes
- Clade: Angiosperms
- Clade: Eudicots
- Clade: Rosids
- Order: Malpighiales
- Family: Euphorbiaceae
- Genus: Euphorbia
- Species: E. angusta

Binomial name
- Euphorbia angusta Engelm.

Synonyms
- Chamaesyce angusta Small

= Euphorbia angusta =

Species of plant

Euphorbia angusta (also known as Chamaesyce angusta) is a species in the Euphorbiaceae (spurge) family with the common name blackfoot sandmat. It is native to central and south Texas and northern Mexico.

== Description ==
Euphorbia angusta is a leggy erect branching herb that grows up to 40 centimeters tall. It has linear opposite leaves that arise from slightly swollen stem nodes. Both stems and leaves are covered sparsely with white hairs. Small single white flowers arise near leaf nodes and are composed of small but showy involucral gland appendages with toothed margins.

== Range and habitat ==
Euphorbia angusta grows primarily on rocky limestone soils on the Edwards Plateau in Texas and in northern Mexico.
