= Eldorado High School =

Eldorado High School may refer to:

- Eldorado High School (New Mexico), United States
- Eldorado High School (Nevada), United States
- Eldorado High School (Illinois), United States
- Eldorado High School (Oklahoma), United States
- Eldorado High School (Texas), United States
- Eldorado High School (Namibia), Africa
