= Adams, Texas =

Adams
- Unincorporated community
- Location within the state of Texas Adams (the United States)
- Coordinates: 30°56′5″N 100°15′53″W
- Country: United States
- State: Texas
- County: Schleicher
- Elevation: 2,300 ft (700 m)
- Time zone: UTC-6 (Central (CST))
  - Summer (DST): UTC-5 (CDT)
- GNIS feature ID: 1379315

Adams is an unincorporated community in Schleicher County, Texas, United States. Its elevation is 2,300 ft (701 m). Adams is located northeast of Eldorado, the county seat of Schleicher County.

== Climate ==
The climate in this area is characterized by hot, humid summers and generally mild to cool winters. According to the Köppen climate classification, Adams has a humid subtropical climate, Cfa on climate maps.
