= Hulldale, Texas =

Hulldale
- unincorporated community
- Location within the state of Texas Hulldale (the United States)
- Coordinates: 31°1′18″N 100°32′36″W
- Country: United States
- State: Texas
- County: Schleicher
- Elevation: 2,201 ft (671 m)
- Time zone: UTC-6 (Central (CST))
  - Summer (DST): UTC-5 (CDT)
- GNIS feature ID: 1379975

Hulldale is an unincorporated community in Schleicher County, Texas, United States. Its elevation is 2,201 ft (671 m). It lies north of Eldorado, the county seat of Schleicher County.
