= Edwards Plateau =

Geographic and ecological region of Texas, United States

Coordinates: 30.3°N 99.6°W

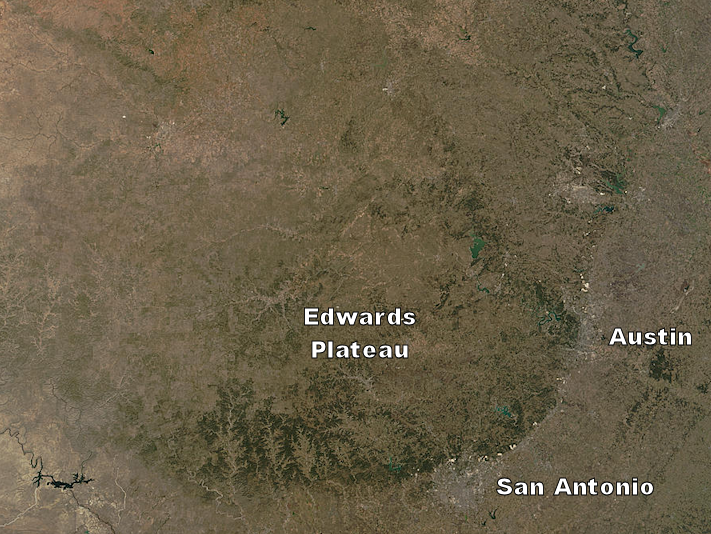
- A photograph taken by NASA of the Edwards Plateau and Balcones Escarpment

Ecology
- Realm: Nearctic
- Biome: Temperate grasslands, savannas, and shrublands
- Bird species: 191
- Mammal species: 64

Geography
- Country: United States
- State: Texas

Conservation
- Habitat loss: 5.35%
- Protected: 2.26%

The Edwards Plateau is a geographic region forming the crossroads of Central, South, and West Texas, United States. It is named in honor of Haden Edwards. It is bounded by the Balcones Fault to the south and east; the Llano Uplift and the Llano Estacado to the north; and the Pecos River and Chihuahuan Desert to the west. San Angelo, Austin, San Antonio, and Del Rio roughly outline the area. The plateau, especially its southeast portion, is also known as the Texas Hill Country.

== Natural history ==
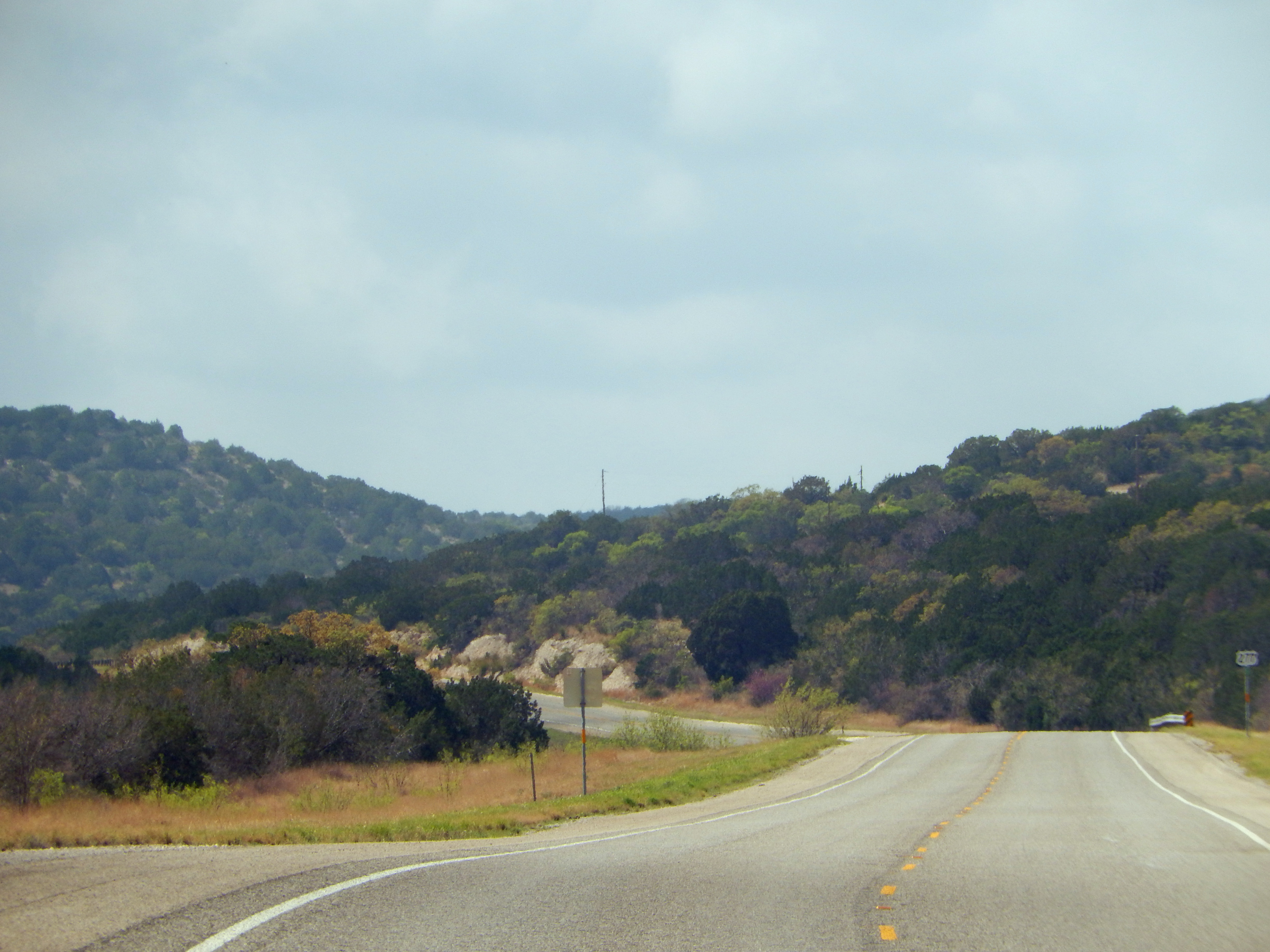
Edwards Plateau terrain as seen from US 277 between Del Rio and Sonora

The bedrock consists primarily of limestone, with elevations ranging between 100 and 3000 ft. Caves are numerous.

The landscape of the plateau is mostly savanna scattered with trees. It mostly lacks deep soil suitable for farming, though the soil type is fertile mollisol, so some cotton, grain sorghum, and oats are grown. For the most part, though, the thin soil and rough terrain areas are primarily grazing regions, with cattle, sheep, and goats (Angora and meat types) predominant. Several rivers cross the region, which generally flow to the south and east through the Texas Hill Country toward the Gulf of Mexico; springs occur (in wet years), but permanent surface water supplies are sparse throughout the area, except for man-made reservoirs. The area is well drained; rainwater flows into the Edwards Aquifer recharge zone at the south of the plateau to feed rivers to the south. Rainfall varies from 15 to 33 inches per year, typically, from northwest to southeast, and the area has a moderate temperature and a reasonably long growing season.

=== Flora ===
Trees of the savanna include Ashe junipers (locally called mountain cedar) and oak species, especially plateau live oak and Texas red oak, scattered over grasses such as little bluestem and sideoats grama, a vegetation type historically shaped by droughts and regular fires. Other abundant woody species include Texas mountain laurel, Texas persimmon, cedar elm, and agarito. Pecan trees are native in floodplains along springs and rivers, which are often lined with stands of baldcypress. The American sycamore (Platanus occidentalis) is also found here. A population of Pinus remota exists in these areas. Ferns found in these region include horsetails, Kunth's maiden fern, maidenhair ferns, and bracken ferns. The Balcones Fault zone, which runs along the southern and eastern edge of the plateau, is an ecological demarcation for the ranges of a number of species.

=== Fauna ===
Caves of the Edwards Plateau are important habitats for wildlife and many endemic species. The area is home to some of the largest colonies of bats in the world, including millions of Mexican free-tailed bats. The largest colony of these inhabits Bracken Cave near San Antonio, while the Congress Avenue Bridge in Austin is the summer home for over half a million (they winter in Mexico) and is the largest bat colony anywhere in an urban area. The Edwards Plateau is home to at least 14 endemic freshwater fishes, including two subterranean species of catfish and 13 fish species considered to be spring-associated. Mechanisms for spring association of fishes is not fully understood, but thought to mediated by water temperature. The large numbers of reptiles and birds also include breeding populations of the Texan endemic golden-cheeked warbler (Setophaga chrysoparia).

Much of the natural habitat of the plateau has been converted to residential development, especially around Austin and San Antonio in the eastern part of the plateau. Further alteration to the savanna has incurred through the encroachment of shrubs now that grassland fires are carefully controlled. Small areas of intact habitat remain in protected areas such as the Balcones Canyonlands National Wildlife Refuge and Lost Maples State Natural Area. Another important area for wildlife is Fort Hood military base.

== Human history ==
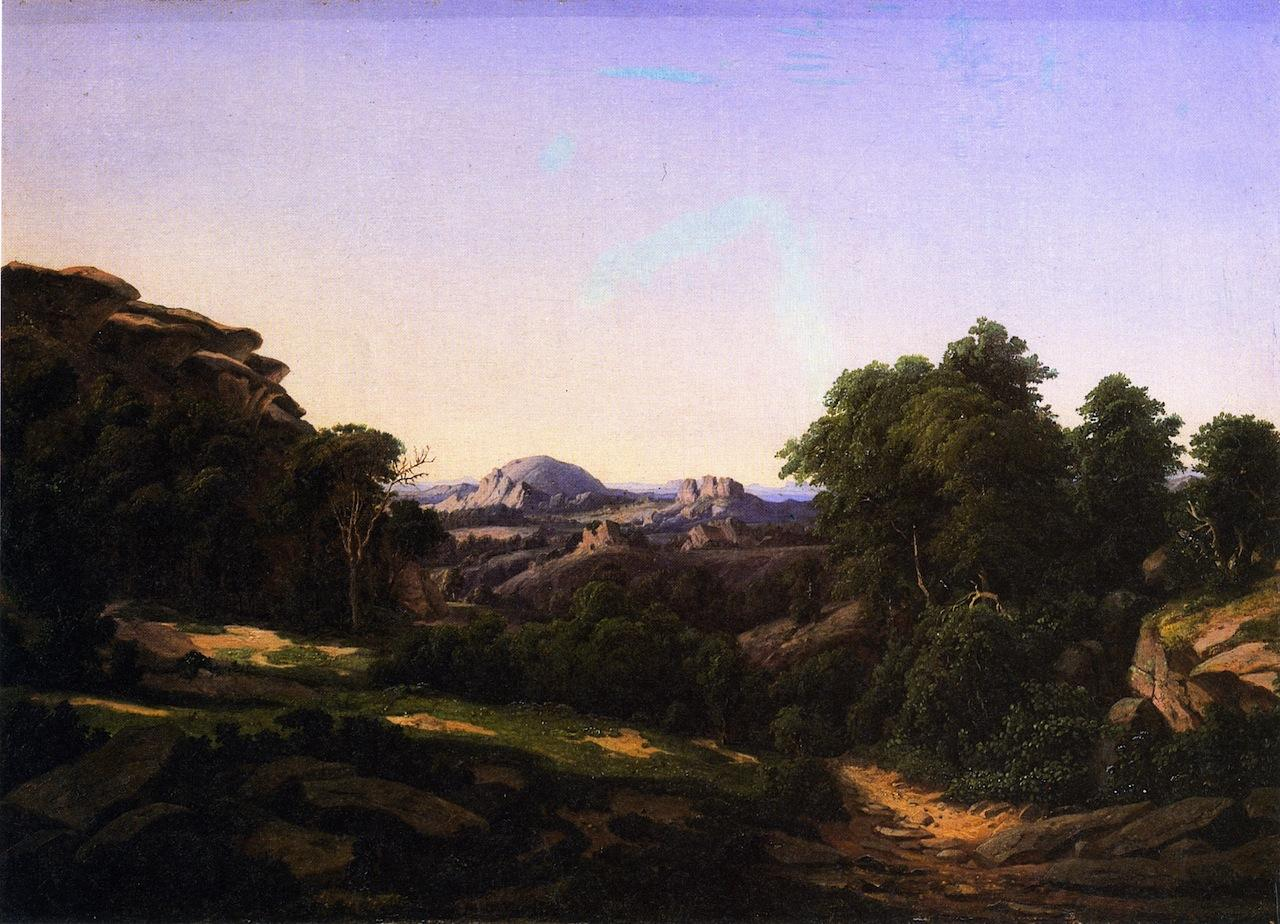
Enchanted Rock near Fredericksburg by Hermann Lungkwitz, 1864, oil on canvas

Earliest human settlement of this area was by Native Americans. First, it was used and wandered about by Jumano and Coahuiltecan groups, then the Apacheria extended into the Southern Plains by the forerunners of the Lipan and Mescalero Apaches. After the expulsion of the Apachean groups from the plains by the Comanche, this area was dominated by the Penateka band of the Southern Comanche.

== Counties in the Edwards Plateau ==
According to the Texas Parks and Wildlife Department, all or portions of these 41 counties comprise the Edwards Plateau geographic region:

- Bosque
- Bandera
- Bell
- Blanco
- Burnet
- Coke
- Comal
- Comanche
- Concho
- Coryell
- Crockett
- Edwards
- Erath
- Gillespie
- Hamilton
- Hays
- Hood
- Irion
- Kendall
- Kerr
- Kimble
- Lampasas
- Llano
- Mason
- McCulloch
- McLennan
- Menard
- Mills
- Palo Pinto
- Reagan
- Real
- San Saba
- Schleicher
- Somervell
- Sterling
- Sutton
- Tom Green
- Travis
- Upton
- Val Verde
- Williamson

The Texas Water Development Board, a state government agency, includes additional counties all or partly in the Edwards Plateau area:

- Andrews
- Ector
- Glasscock
- Howard
- Jeff Davis
- Loving
- Martin
- Mitchell
- Nolan
- Pecos
- Reeves
- Runnels
- Taylor
- Uvalde
- Ward
- Winkler

A map showing the counties is provided by Texas Parks and Wildlife Department for the Edwards Plateau Ecoregion. The ecoregion is somewhat larger than the geographic region, as the map from Texas Parks And Wildlife includes additional counties that are listed by the Texas Water Development Board, notably the isolated area of Edwards Plateau in Taylor, Runnels, and Nolan Counties that is separated from the main region.

== Edwards Plateau gallery ==
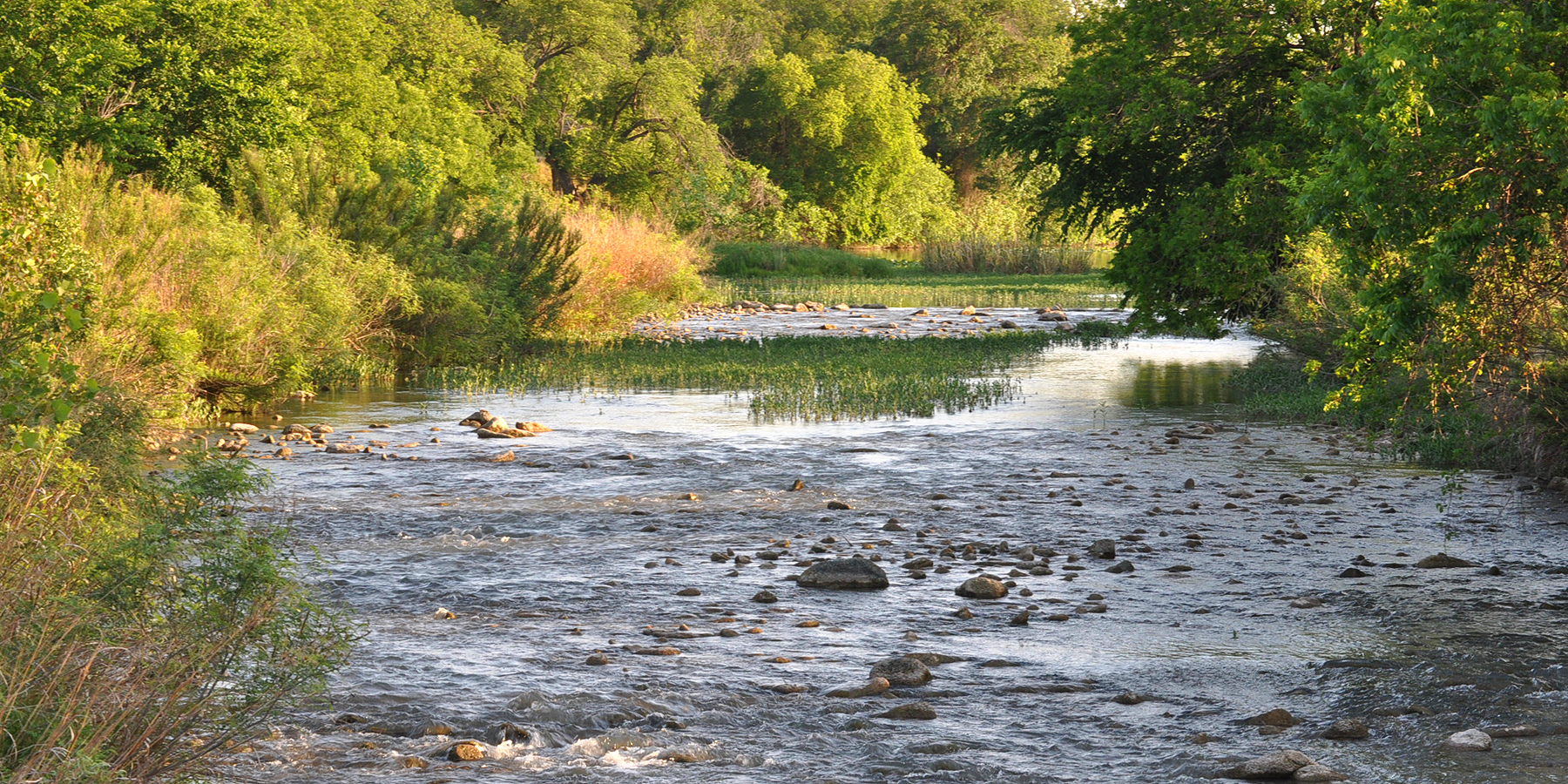
San Saba River near Sloan, San Saba County (9 May 2014)

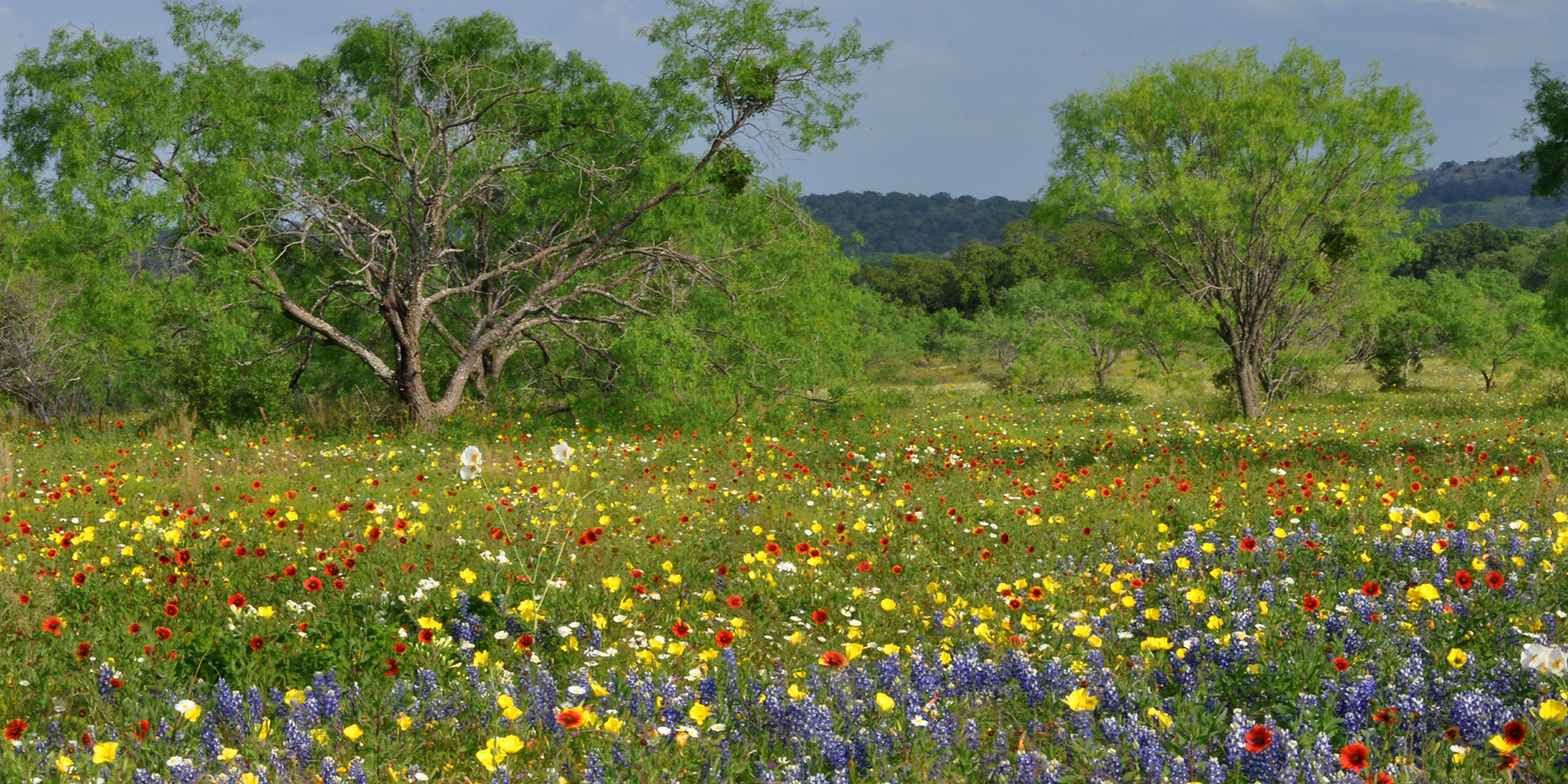
Wildflowers on ranchland, State Highway 965, Llano County (13 April 2012)

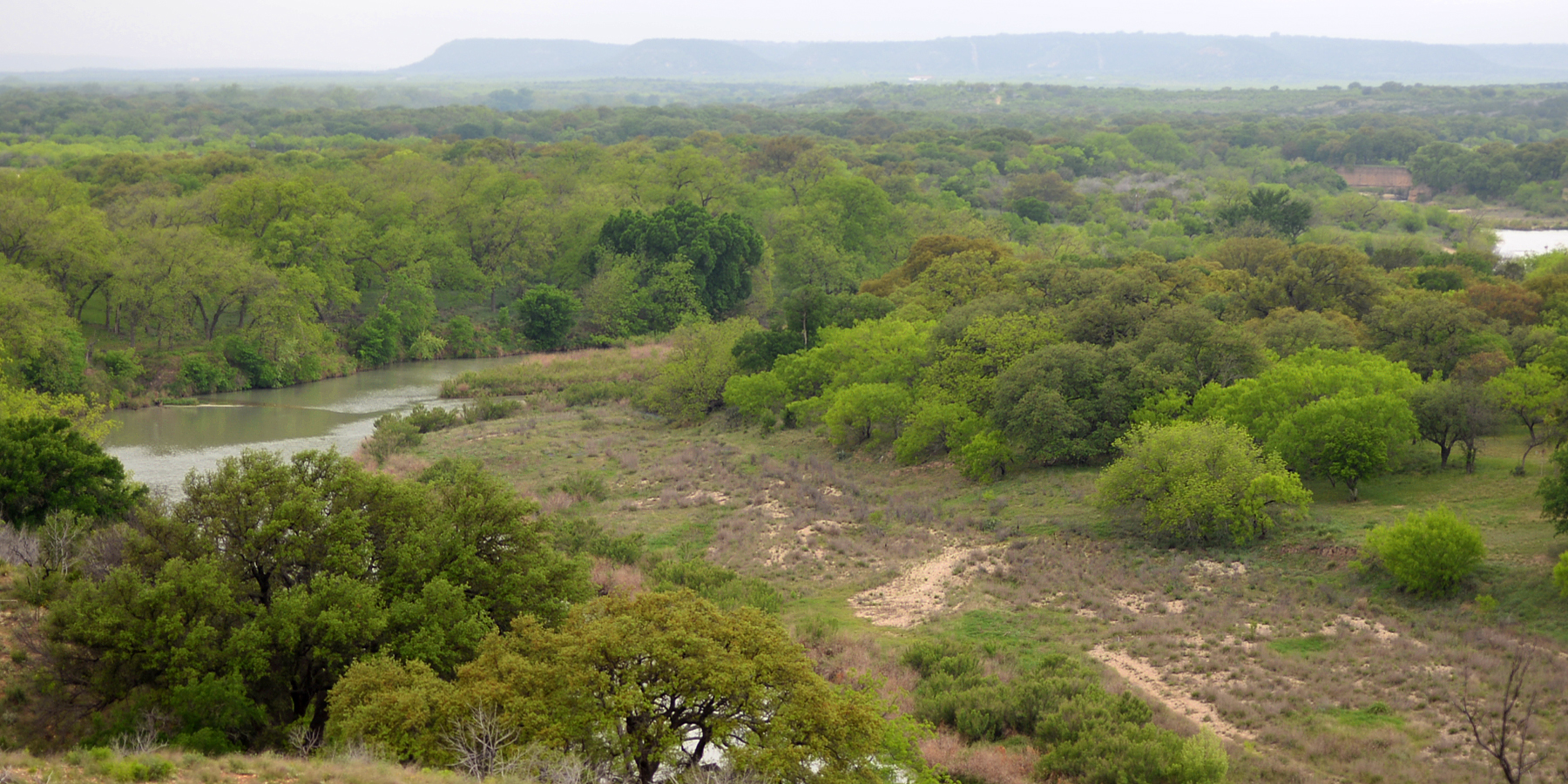
Llano River from County Road 320, Kimble County (17 April 2015)

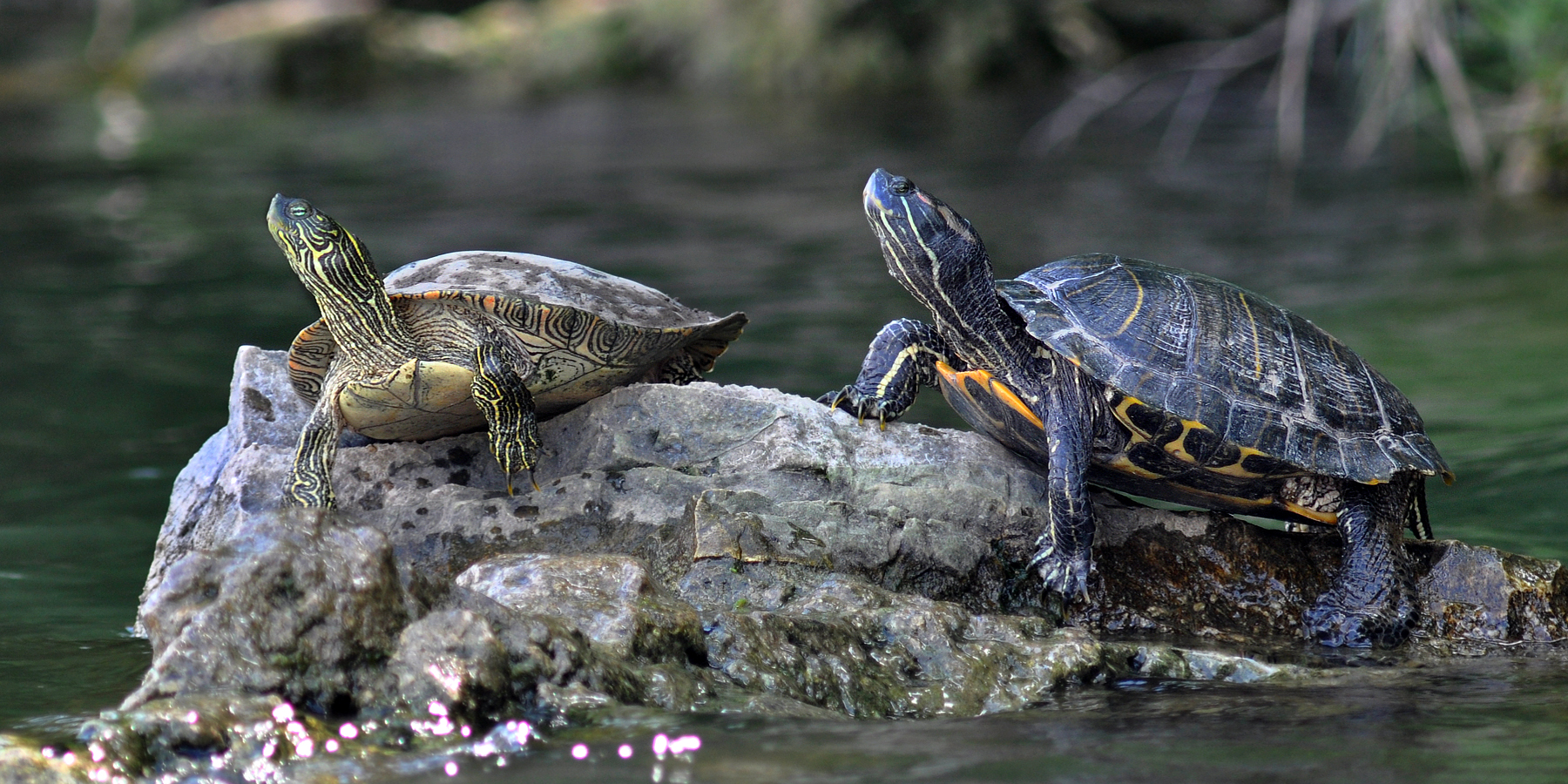
Texas cooter (Pseudemys texana) and red-eared slider (Trachemys scripta), Colorado River, Travis County (12 April 2012)

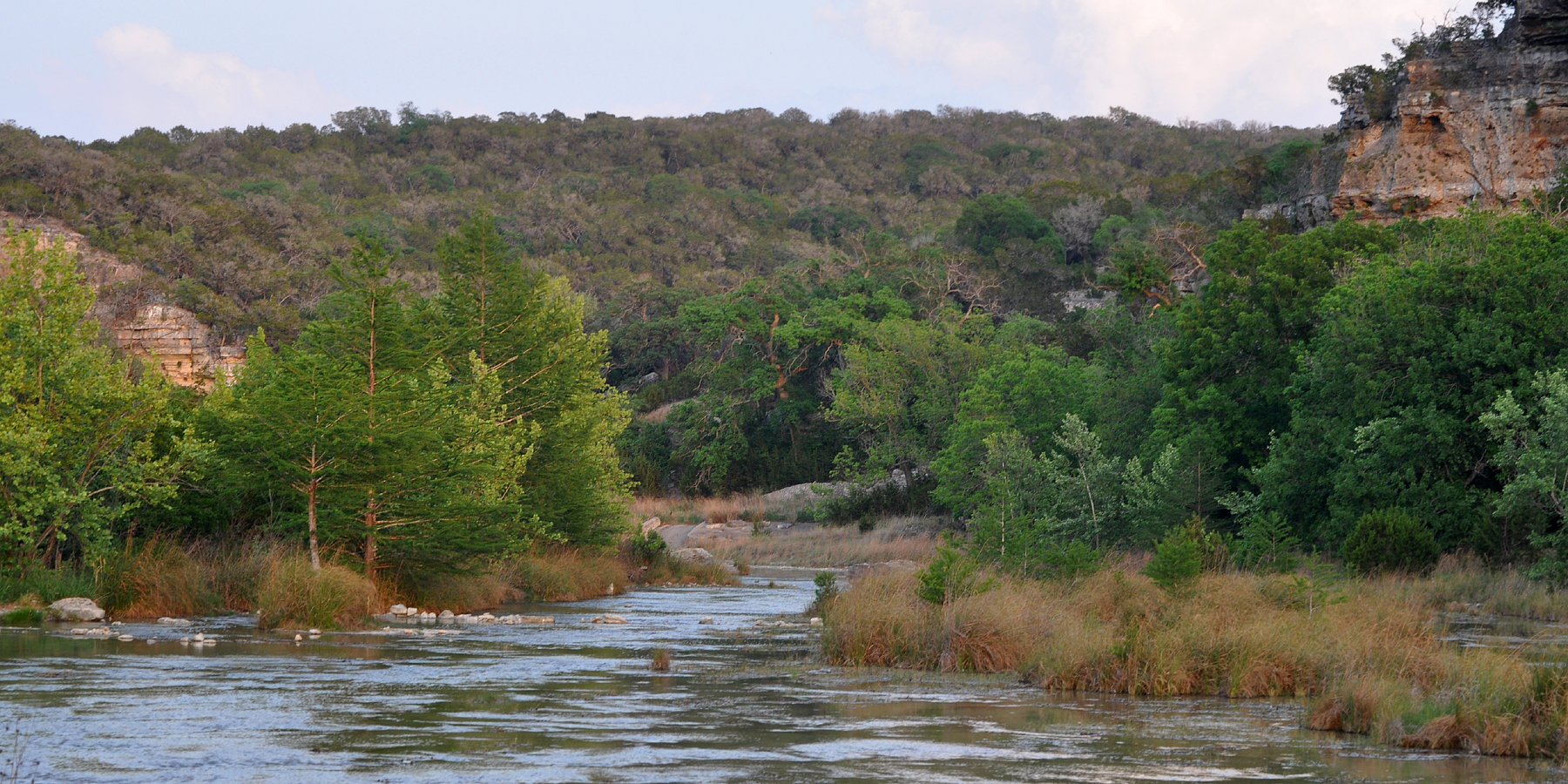
The Guadalupe River in Kerr County (8 May 2014)

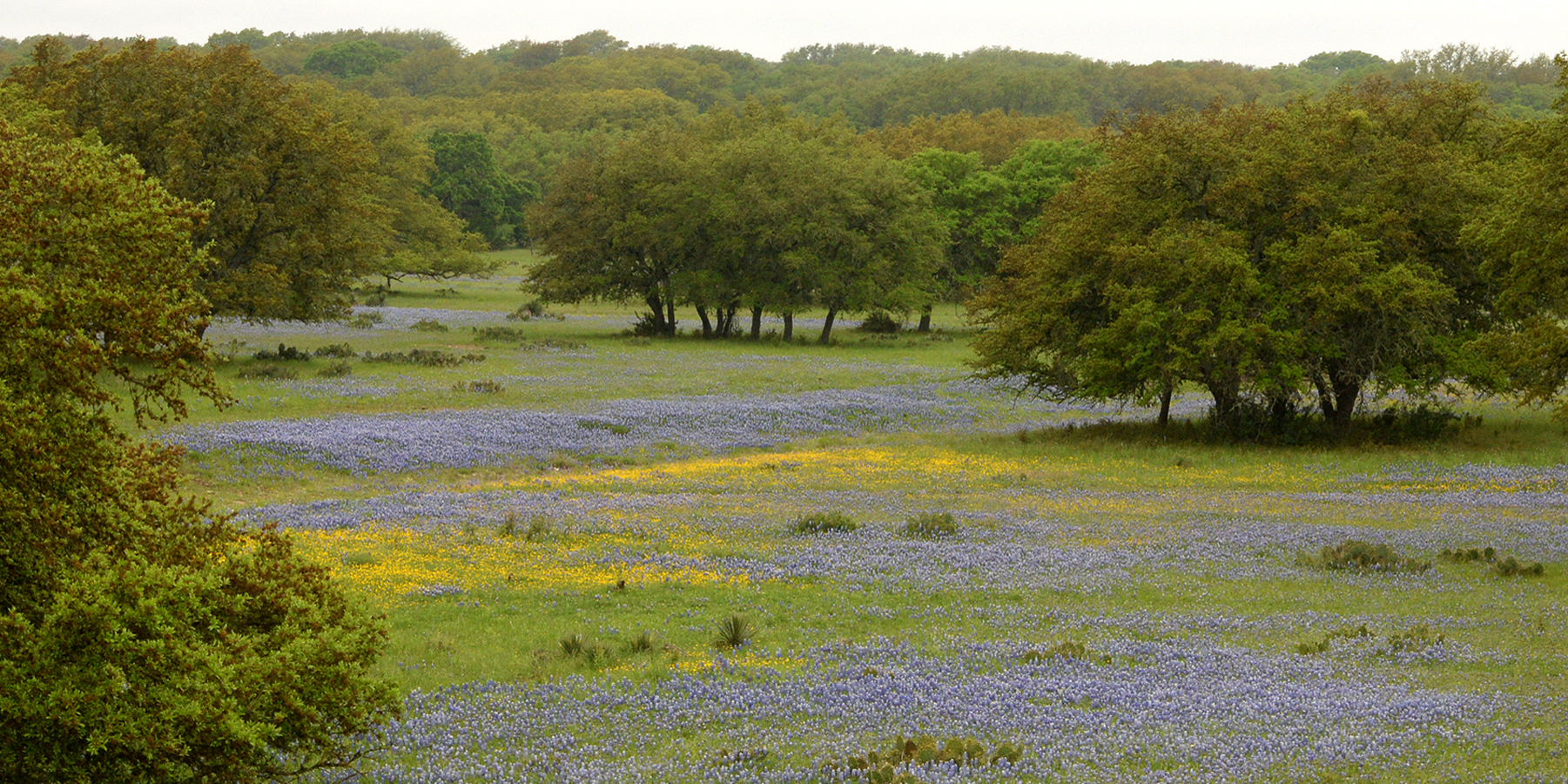
Ranchland with Texas bluebonnets (Lupinus texensis) in western Kerr County (17 April 2015)

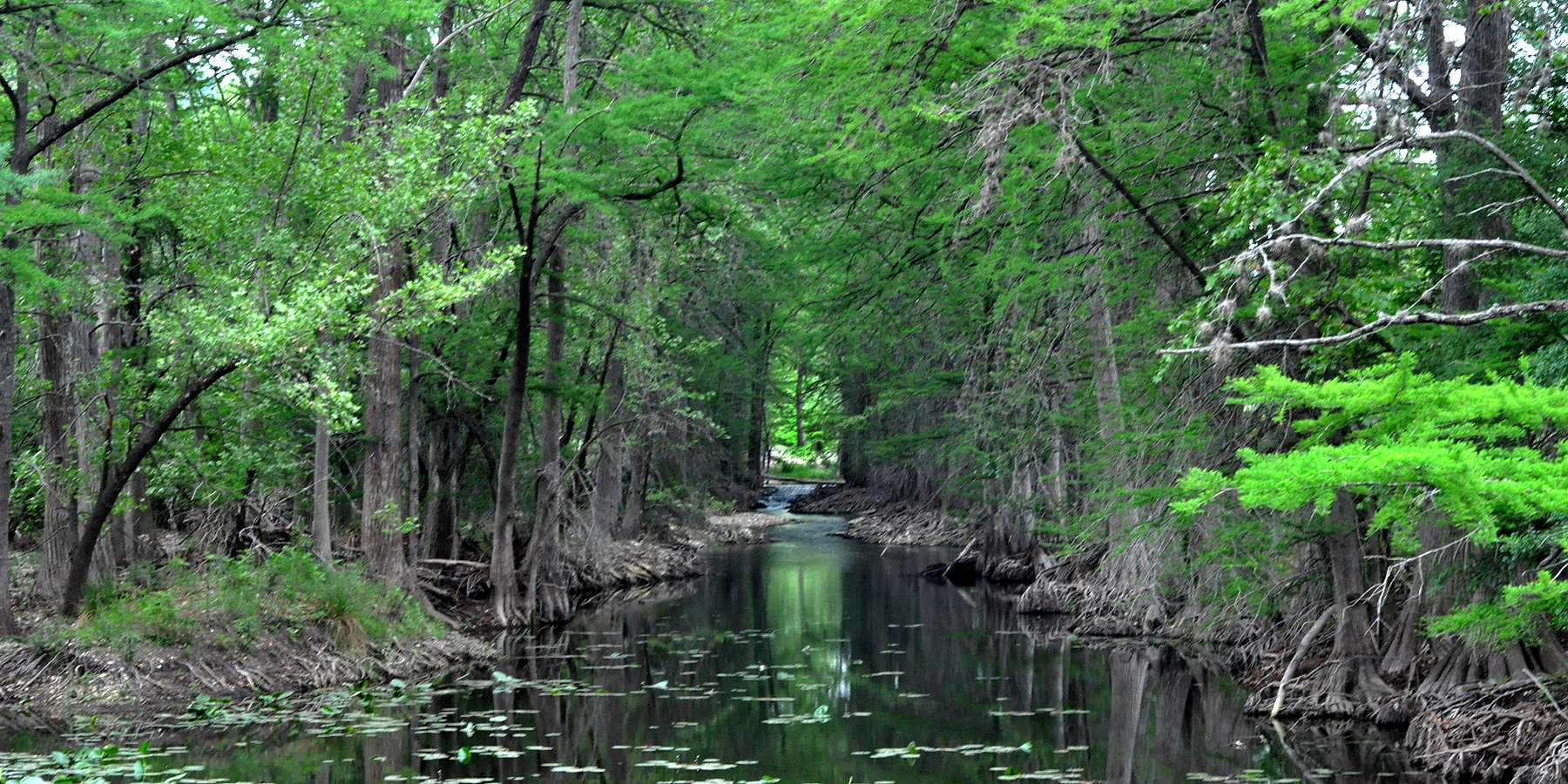
Bald cypress (Taxodium distichum) growing on the Guadalupe River, Kerr County (14 April 2012)

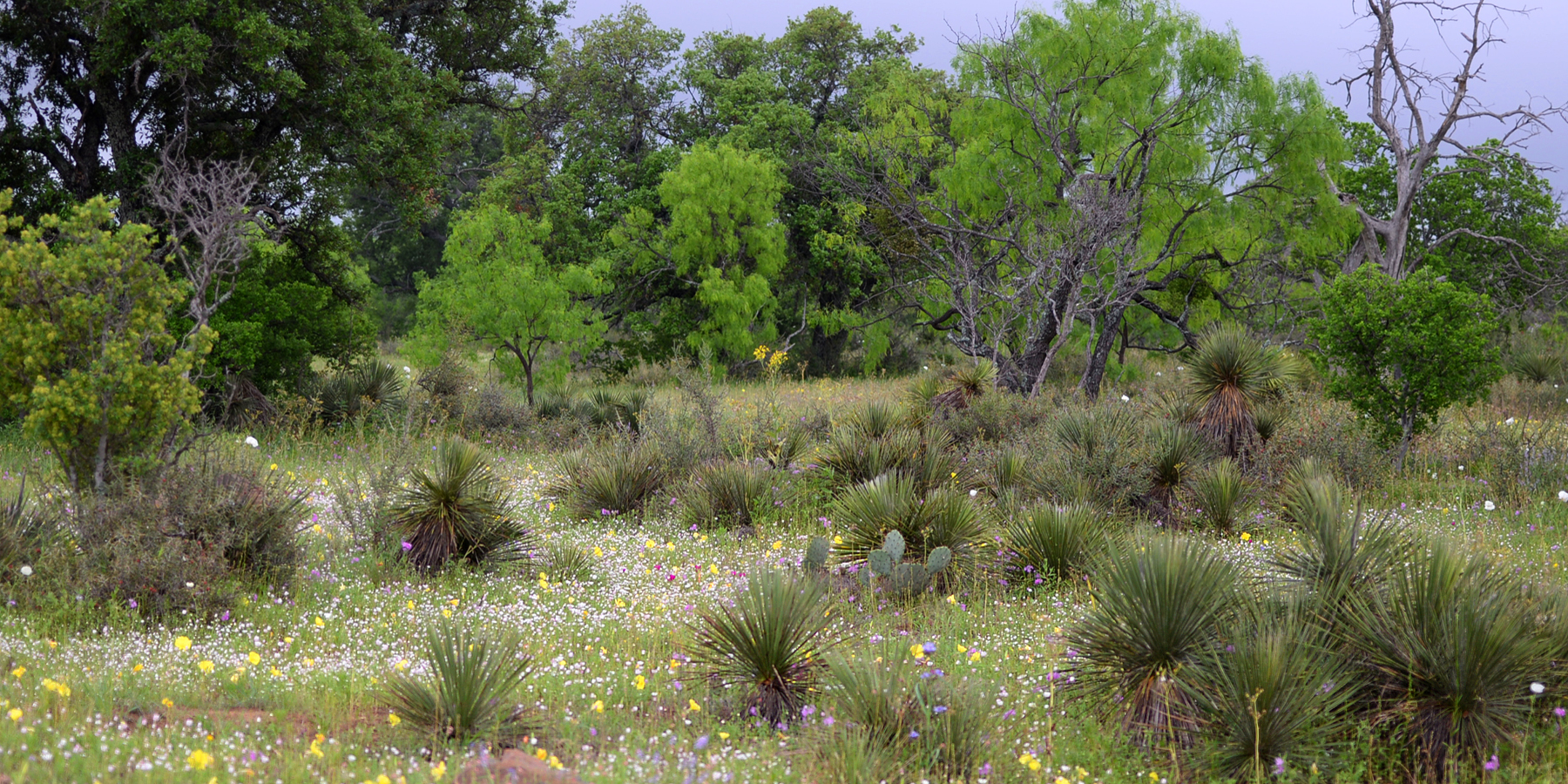
Ranchland in the Edwards Plateau, Mason County (17 April 2015)

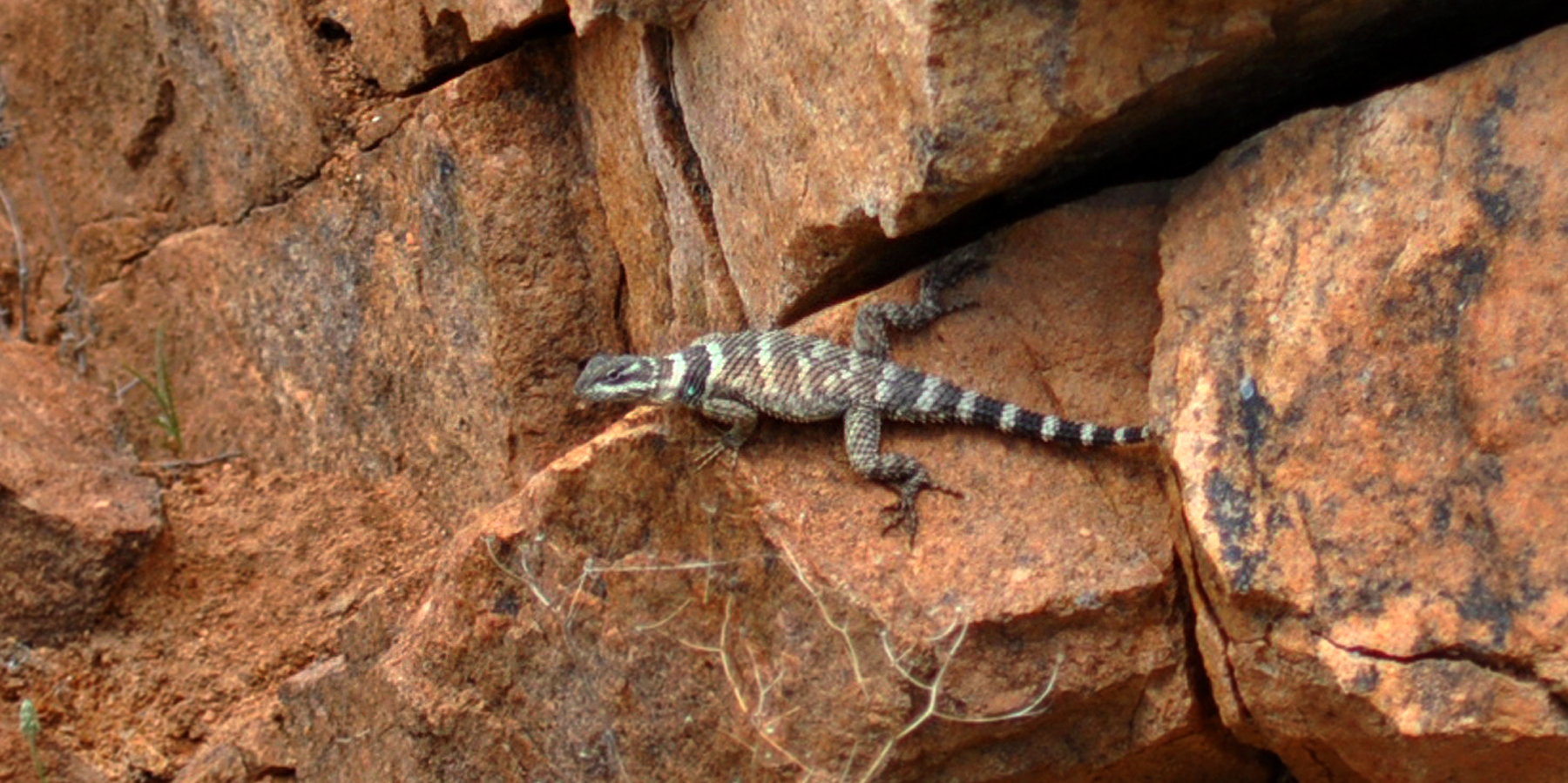
Crevice spiny lizard (Sceloporus poinsettii), Mason County, Texas, US (9 May 2014)

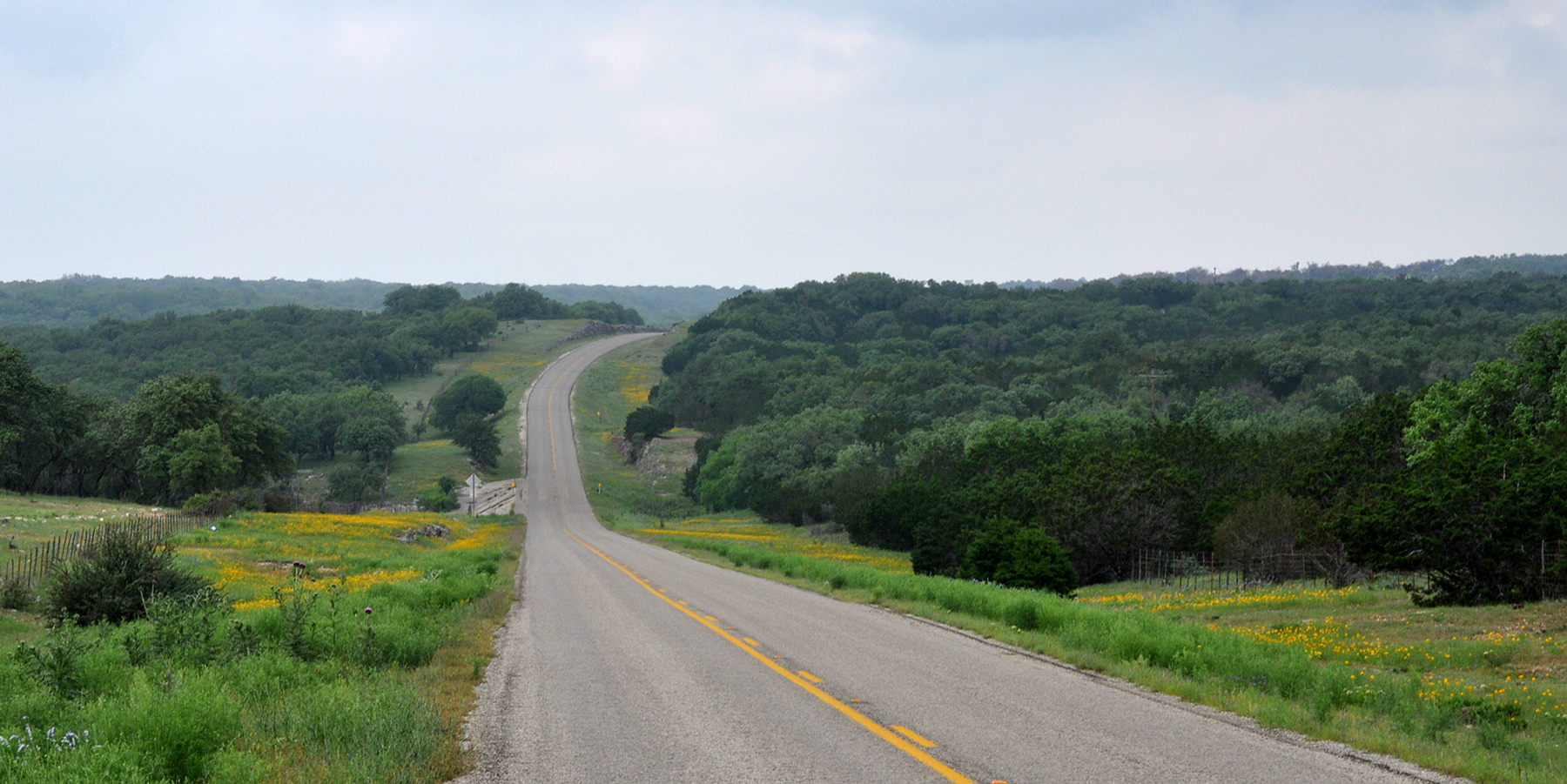
Highway 187 in the Edwards Plateau, Bandera County, Texas, US (14 April 2012)

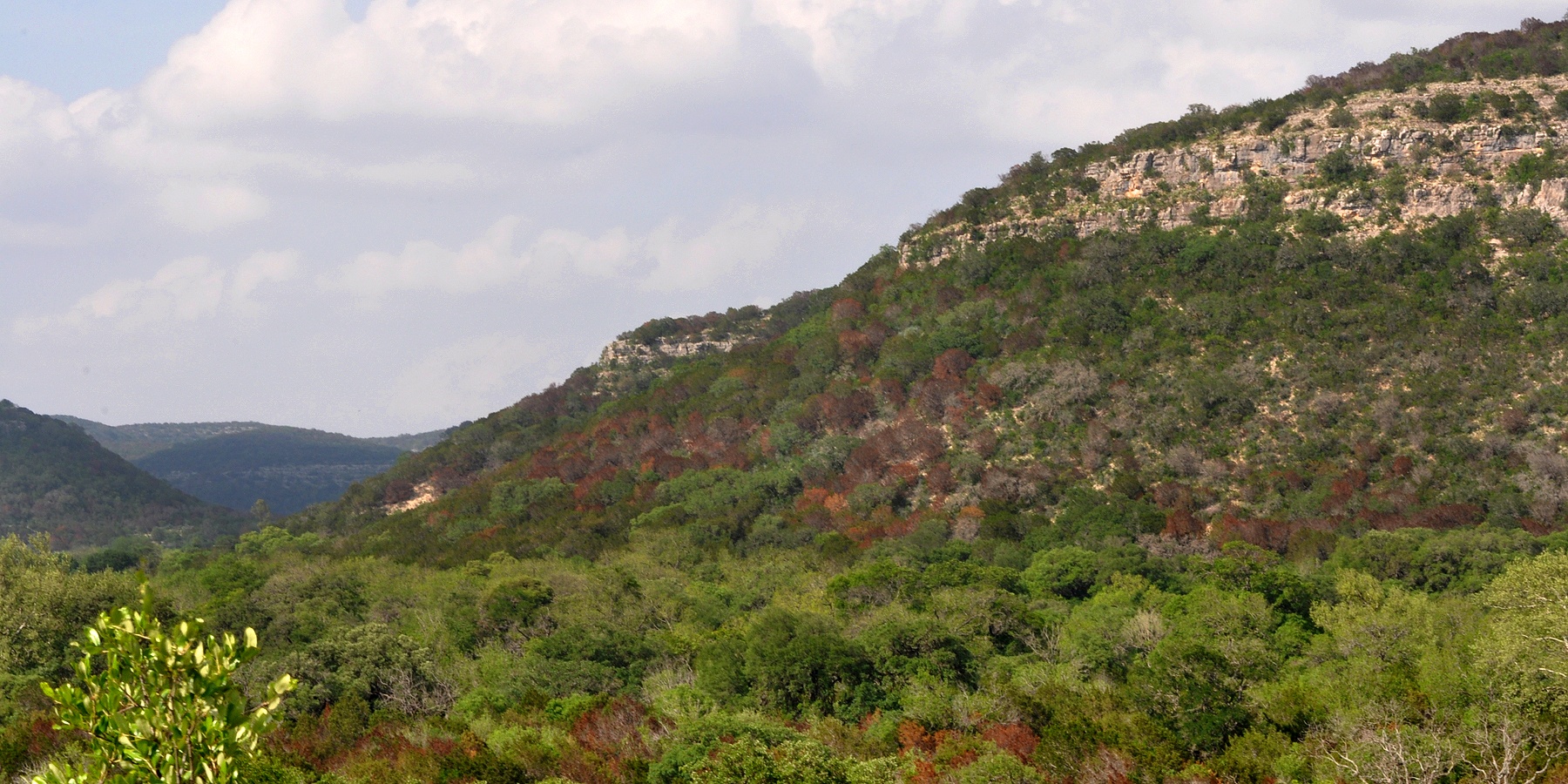
Limestone bluff, typical of the Edwards Plateau, Highway 336, Real County (14 Apr 2012)

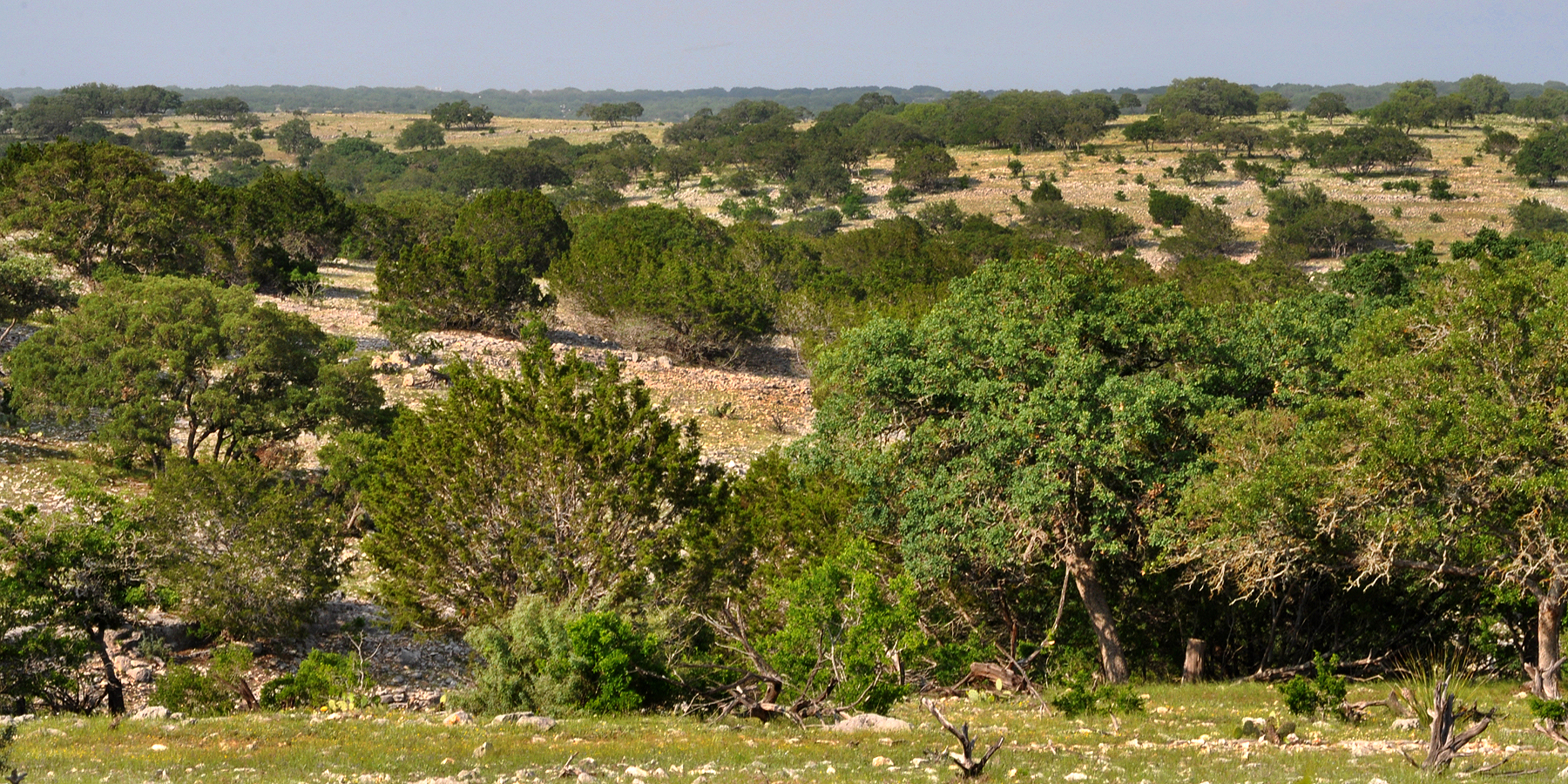
Ranchland seen from Highway 336, Real County (14 April 2012)

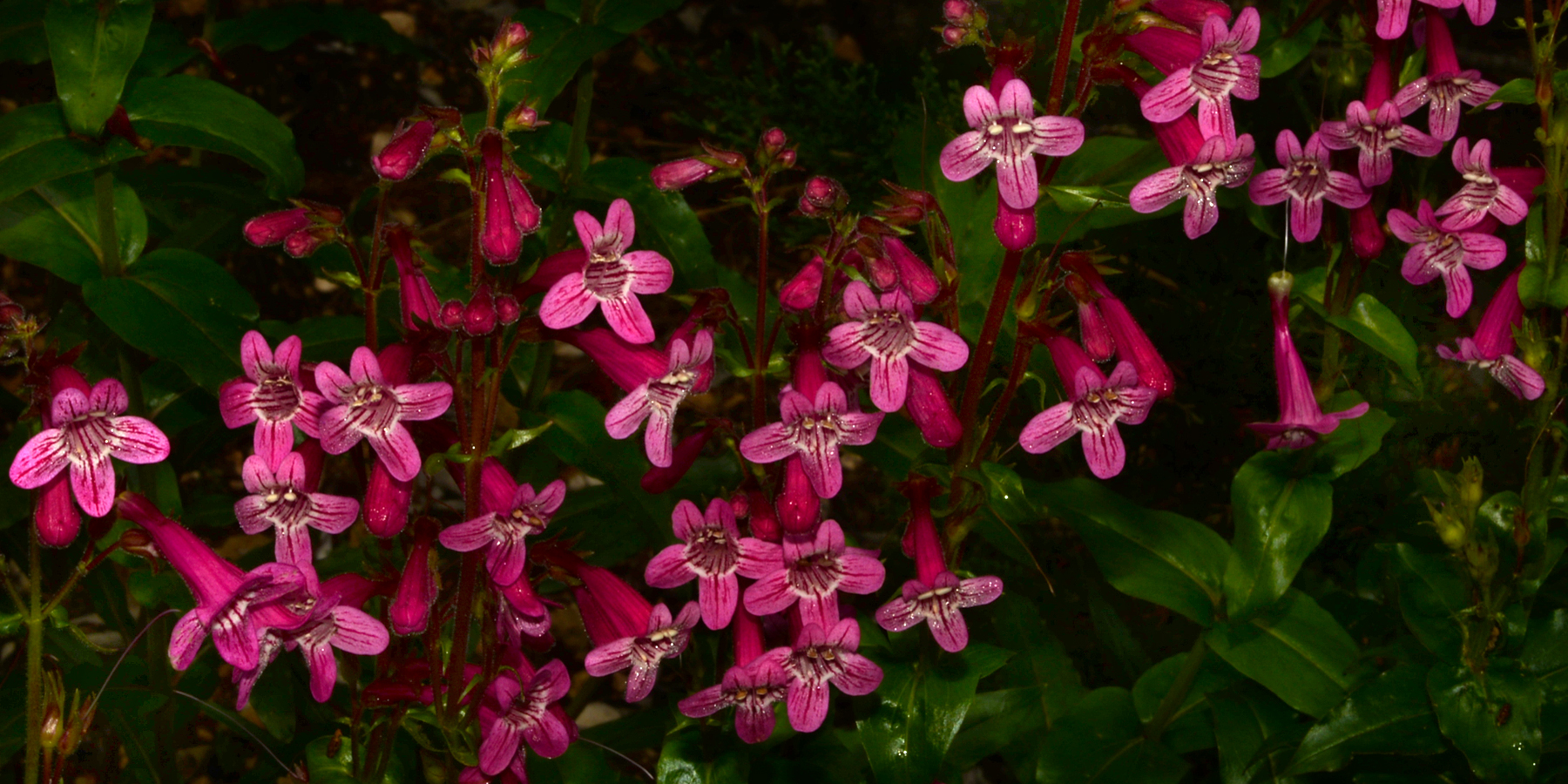
Scarlet penstemon (Penstemon triflorus), endemic to the Edwards Plateau, Edwards County (18 April 2015)

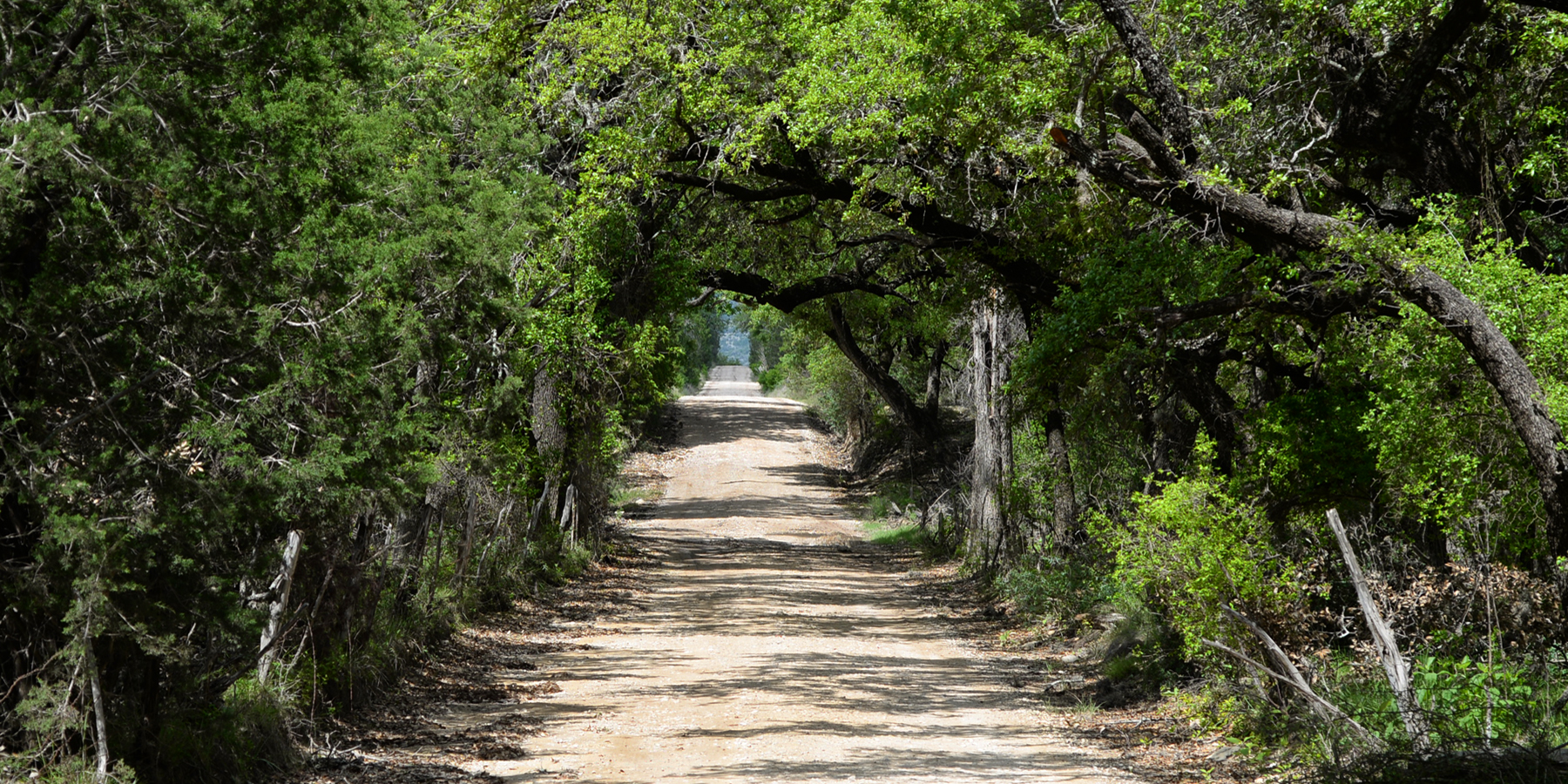
Ranch road in southern Edwards County (18 April 2015).

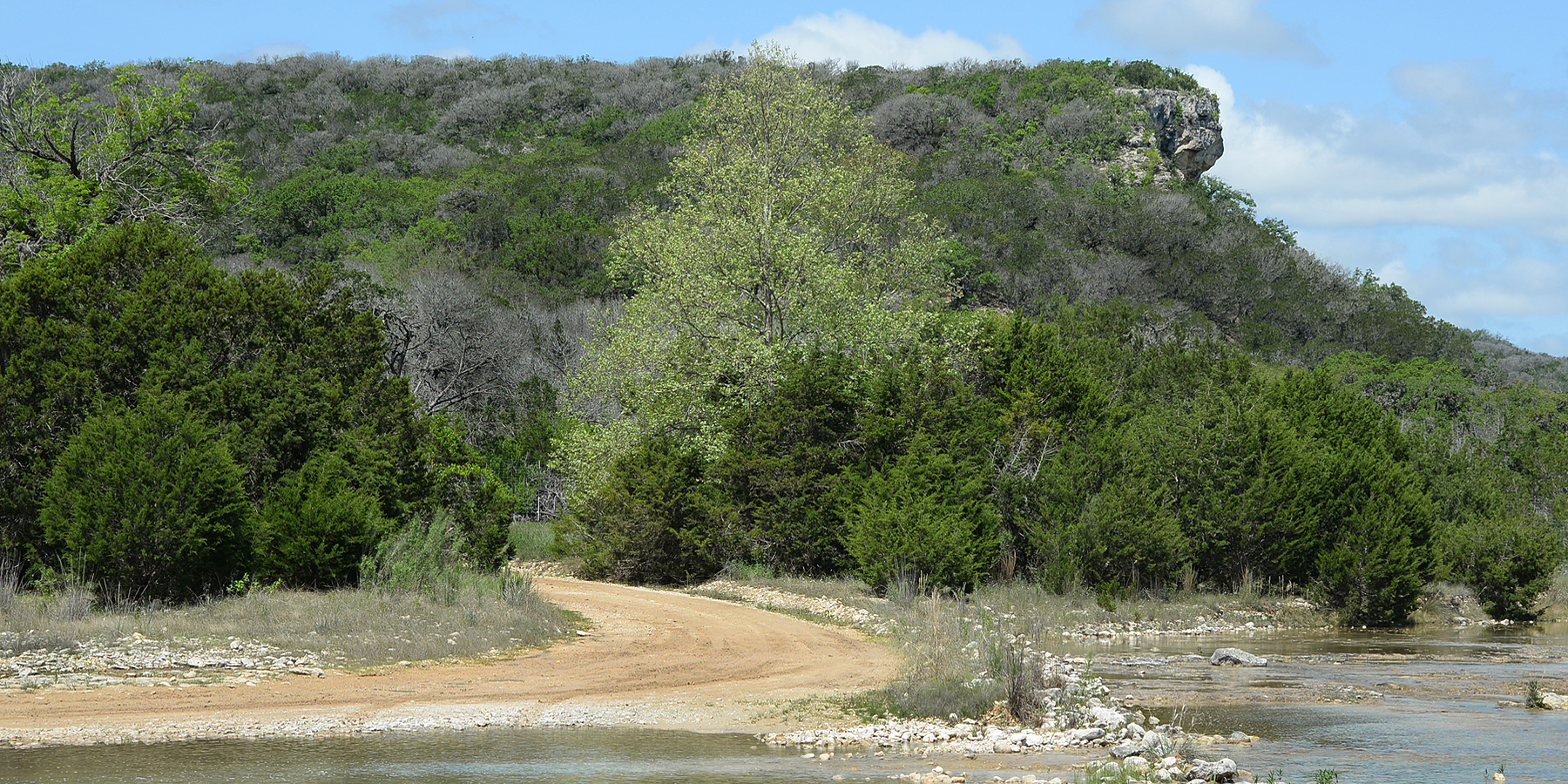
Cedar Creek, Edwards County (18 April 2015)

== See also ==
- Balcones Canyonlands National Wildlife Refuge
- Colorado River (Texas)
- Mount Bonnell
- List of ecoregions in the United States (EPA)
- List of ecoregions in the United States (WWF)
