= Eldorado High School (Texas) =

Coordinates: 30.8636°N 100.5997°W

Location
- 205 Fields Ave. Eldorado, Texas 76936; United States

Information
- School type: Public high school
- School district: Schleicher County Independent School District
- Principal: Matt Odom
- Teaching staff: 17.62 (FTE)
- Grades: 9-12
- Enrollment: 163 (2023-2024)
- Student to teacher ratio: 9.25
- Colors: Kelly Green & White
- Athletics conference: UIL Class 2A
- Mascot: Eagles/Lady Eagles
- Yearbook: Talon
- Website: www.scisd.net/o/elhs

Eldorado High School is a public high school located in Eldorado, (USA). It is part of the Schleicher County Independent School District located in central Schleicher County and covers the entire county. In 2015, the school was rated "Met Standard" by the Texas Education Agency.

== Athletics ==
The Eldorado Eagles compete in these sports -

Cross Country, Football, Basketball, Golf, Tennis, Track, Powerlifting, Softball & Baseball

=== State Titles ===
- Boys Cross Country -
  - 1987(2A)
- Boys Track -
  - 1964(1A)
- Girls Track -
  - 1973(B)

=== Individual State Titles ===
- Abigail Narvaez (Powerlifting)
  - 2016 (2A)

== Band ==
- Band Sweepstakes Champions
  - 2019(2A)
