= Schleicher Independent School District =

School district in Texas, United States

Coordinates: 30°51′49.4″N 100°35′58.7″W

Schleicher Independent School District is a public school district based in Eldorado, Texas, United States. The district's boundaries are the same as Schleicher County. In 2009, the school district was rated "academically acceptable" by the Texas Education Agency.

== Schools ==
The district has three campuses -

- Eldorado High School (grades 9-12),
- Eldorado Middle School (grades 5-8)
- Eldorado Elementary School (prekindergarten-grade 4).
