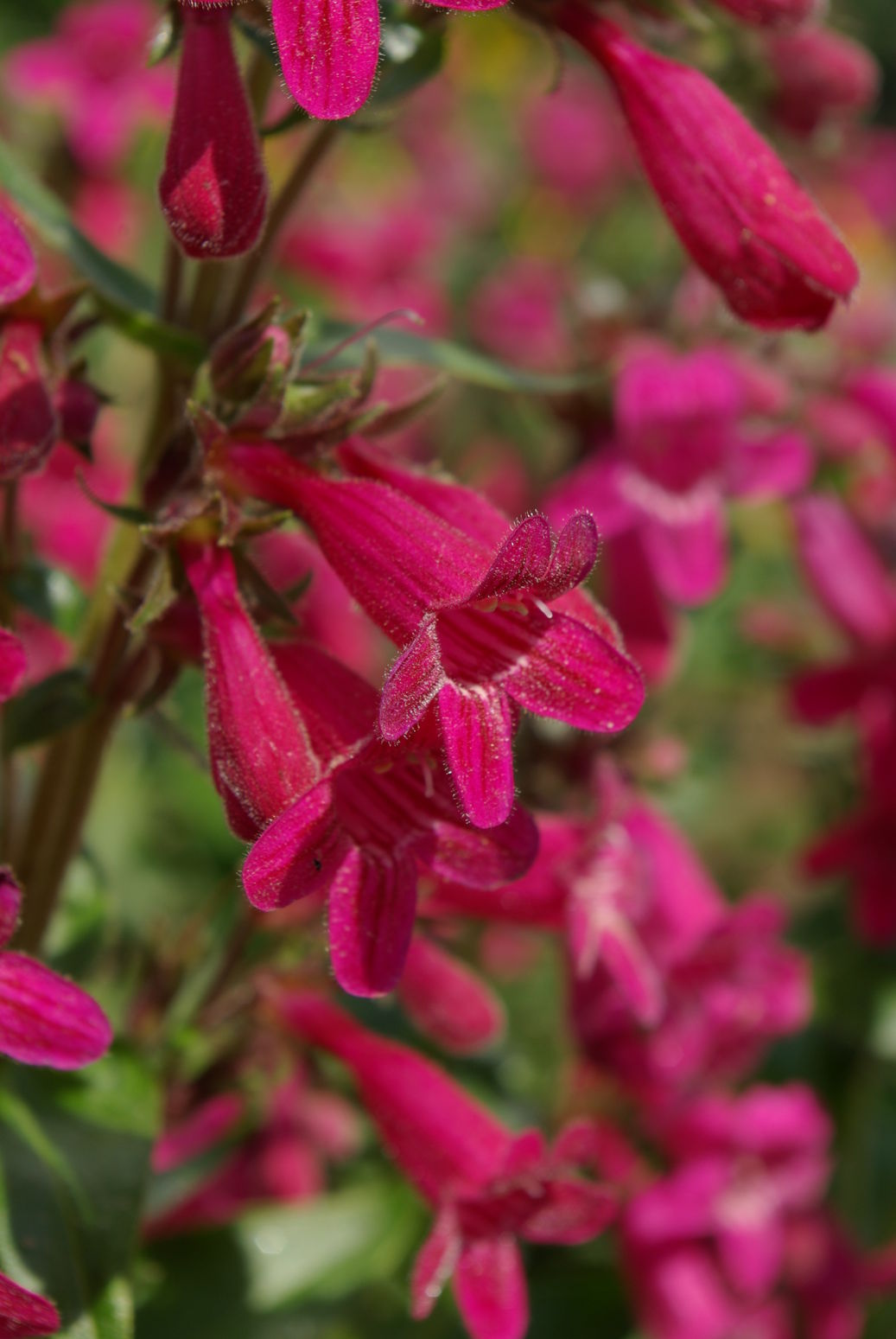

Conservation status
- Vulnerable (NatureServe)

Scientific classification
- Kingdom: Plantae
- Clade: Tracheophytes
- Clade: Angiosperms
- Clade: Eudicots
- Clade: Asterids
- Order: Lamiales
- Family: Plantaginaceae
- Genus: Penstemon
- Species: P. triflorus

Binomial name
- Penstemon triflorus A.Heller

= Penstemon triflorus =

Heller's beardtongue

Species of flowering plant

Penstemon triflorus, Heller's beardtongue or Heller's penstemon, is a penstemon notable for its showy, purple blossoms.

== Distribution and habitat ==
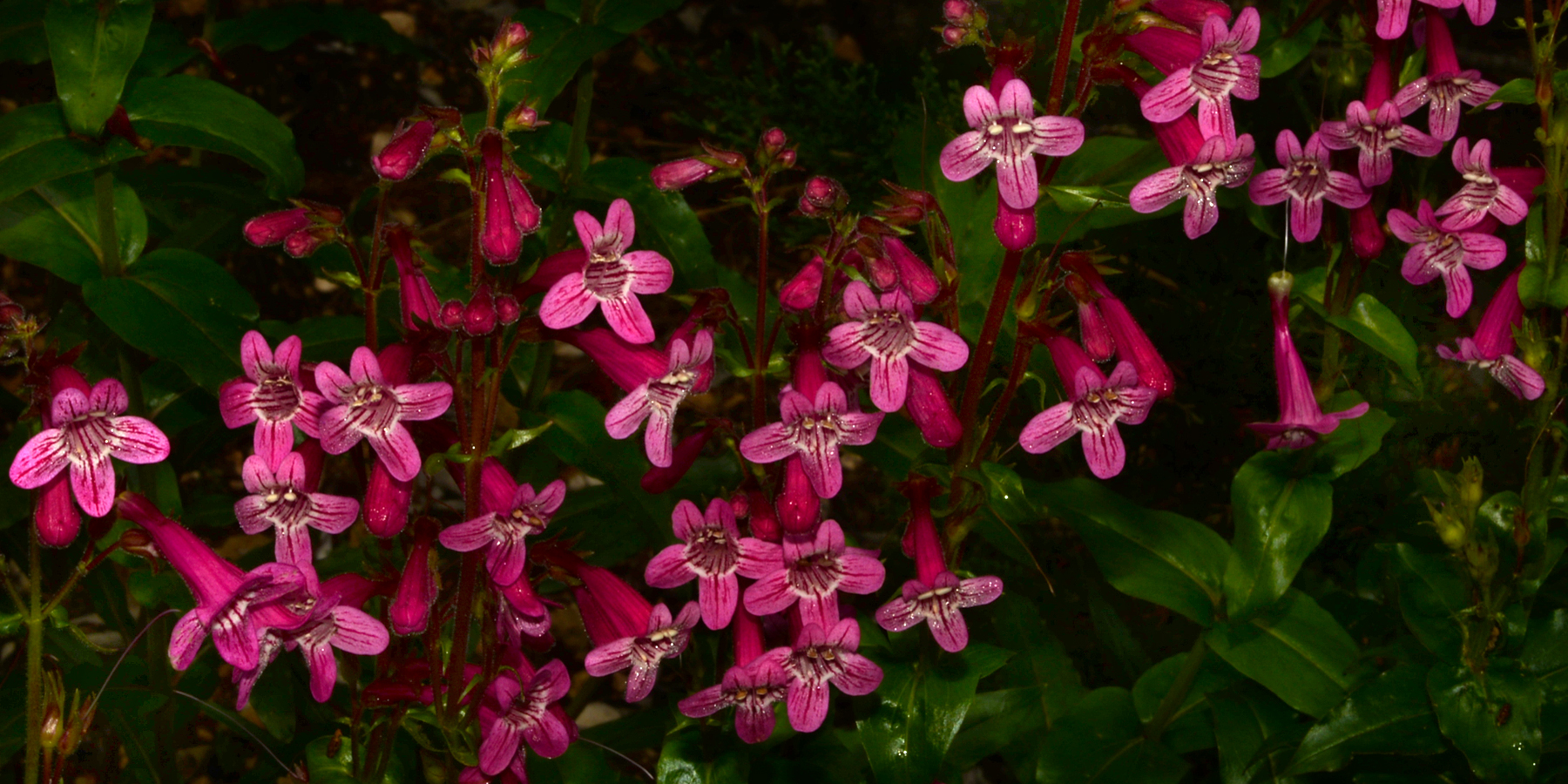
Scarlet penstemon (Penstemon triflorus), endemic to the Edwards Plateau, Edwards County, Texas, USA (18 April 2015).

Heller's beardtongue grows on the Edwards Plateau of Texas.
