= Schleicher County, Texas =

County in Texas, United States

- County
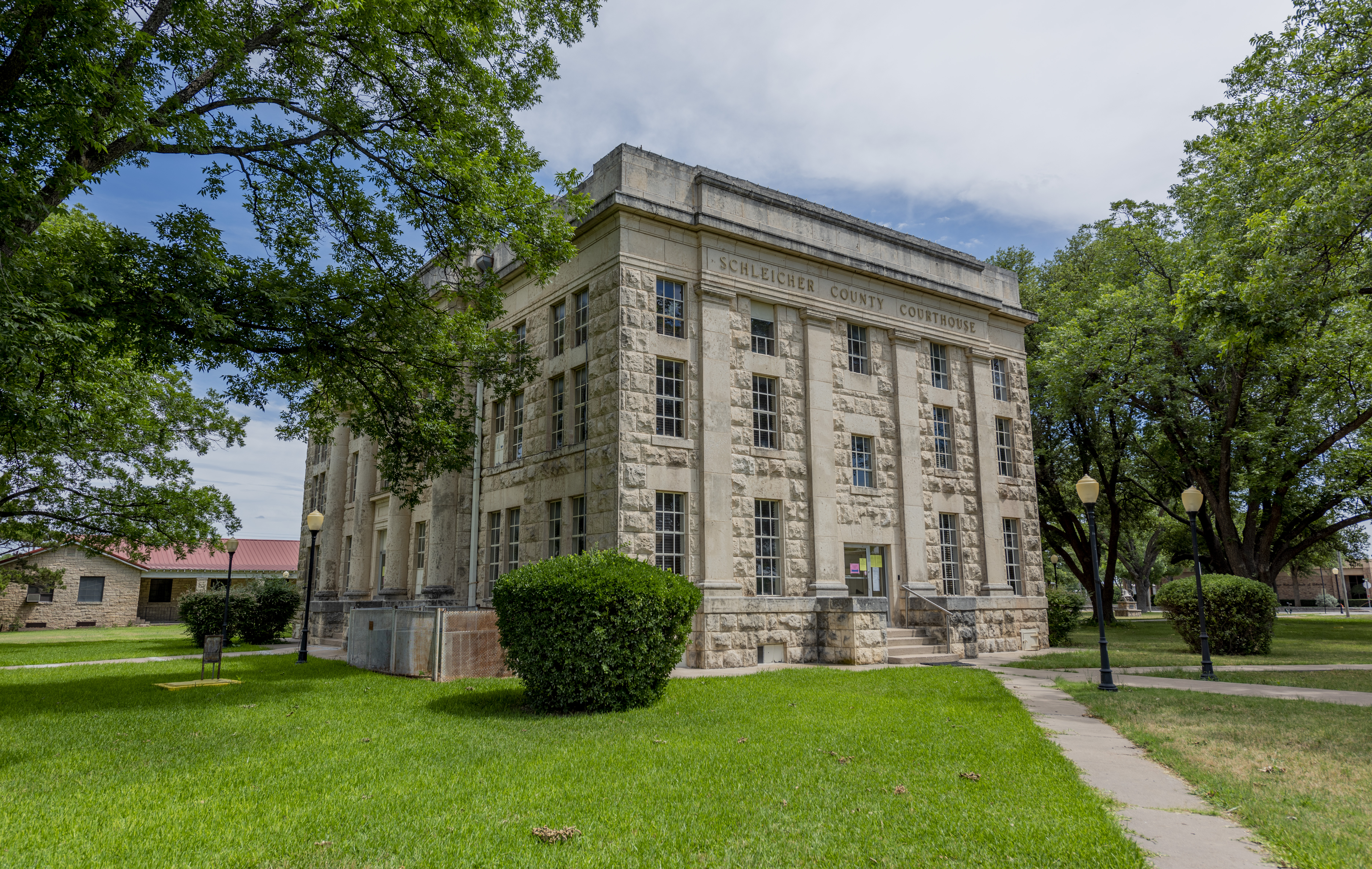
- Schleicher County Courthouse in Eldorado

- Location within the U.S. state of Texas
- Coordinates: 30°54′N 100°32′W
- Country: United States
- State: Texas
- Founded: April 1st, 1887
- Named for: Gustav Schleicher
- Seat: Eldorado
- Largest city: Eldorado

Area
  - Total: 1,311 sq mi (3,400 km^{2})
  - Land: 1,311 sq mi (3,400 km^{2})
  - Water: 0.03 sq mi (0.078 km^{2}) 0%

Population (2020)
  - Total: 2,451
  - Estimate (2025): 2,245 ▼
  - Density: 1.870/sq mi (0.7218/km^{2})
- Time zone: UTC−6 (Central)
  - Summer (DST): UTC−5 (CDT)
- Congressional district: 23rd
- Website: www.schleichercounty.gov

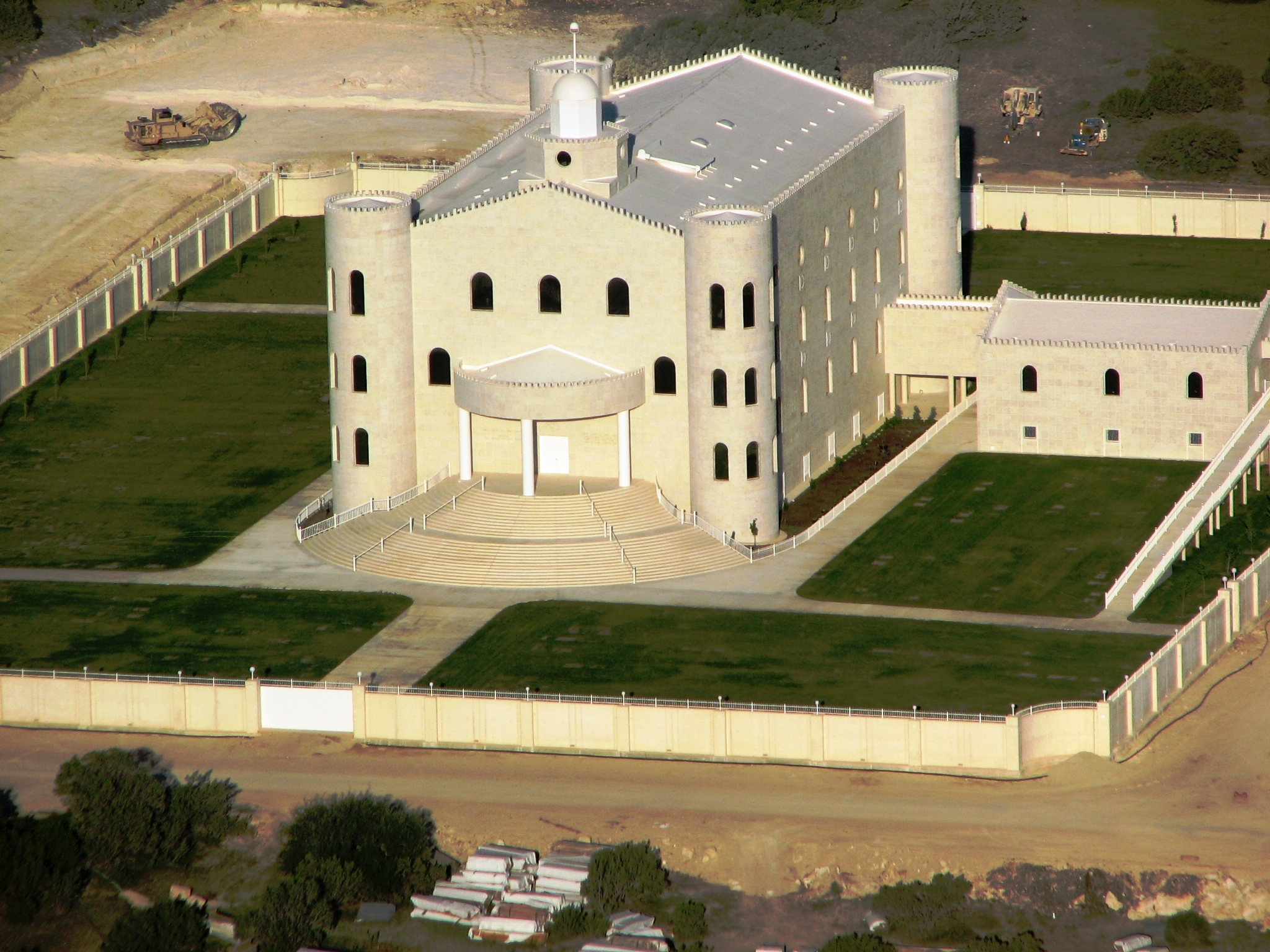
FLDS Temple at the YFZ Ranch in Schleicher County

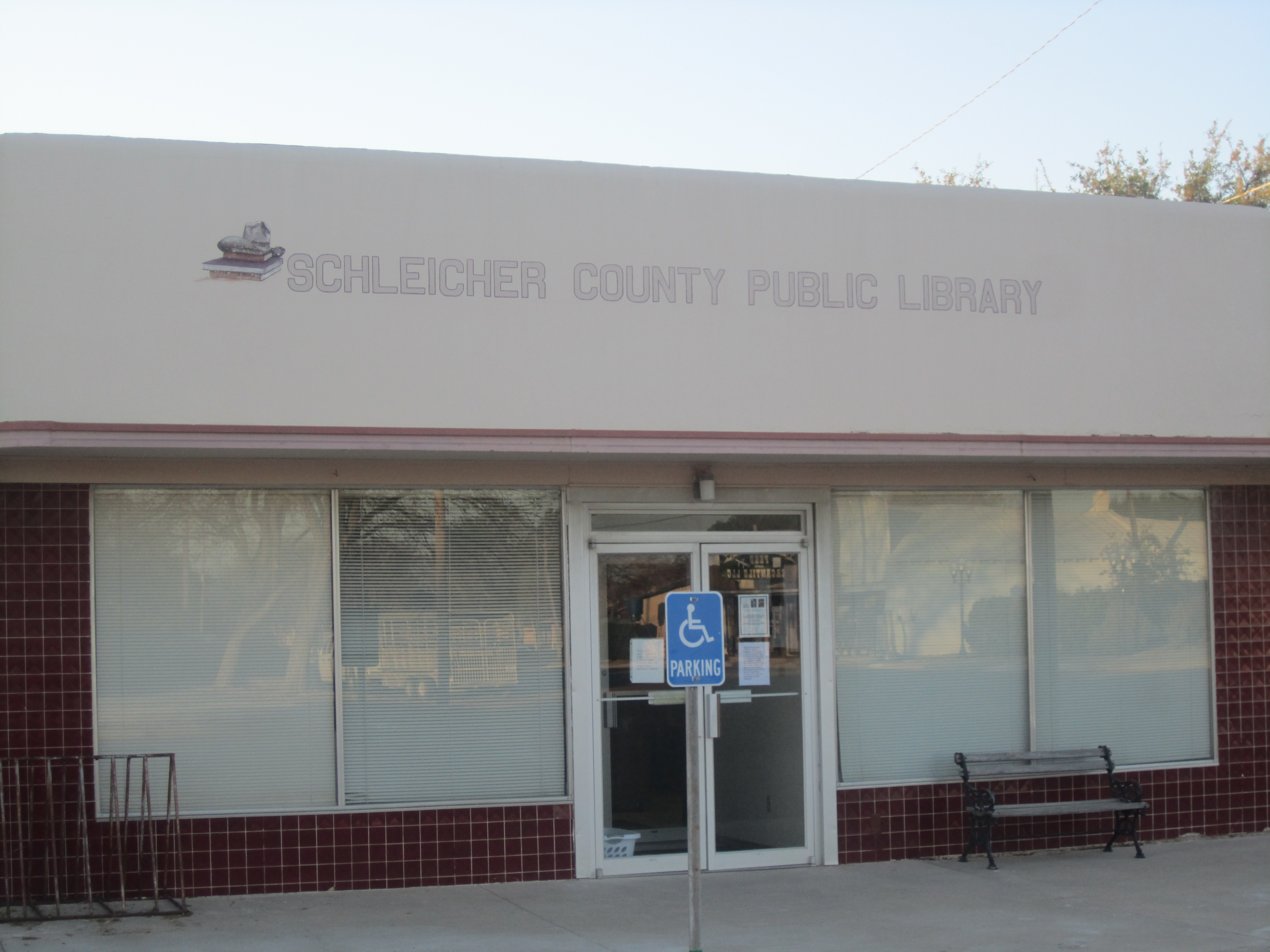
Schleicher County Public Library in Eldorado

Schleicher County is a county located on the Edwards Plateau in the U.S. state of Texas. As of the 2020 census, its population was 2,451. Its county seat is Eldorado. The county was created in 1887 and organized in 1901. It is named for Gustav Schleicher, a German immigrant who became a surveyor and politician.

== History ==
Around 8000 BC, the first inhabitants in the area were probably Jumano Indians. Later inhabitants were Lipan Apaches and Comanches. In 1632, Fray Juan de Salas and Father Juan de Ortega did missionary work among the Jumanos. Soldier Francisco Amangual led an expedition across the area in 1808. In 1882, Christopher Columbus Doty became the first permanent citizen of Schleicher County.

The Texas Legislature established Schleicher County in April 1887 from Crockett County, and named it in honor of Gustav Schleicher. By 1890, the population was 155, of whom 134 were listed as White, four were Black, and 17 were American Indian.

In 1894, the county's first public school opened at Verand, and later moved to Eldorado. The next year, W. B. Silliman founded the Eldorado community and named it after the mythical city. To populate it, he offered free town lots to residents of nearby Verand. In 1930, the Panhandle and Santa Fe Railway Company resumed work on a previous railroad, making access possible to San Angelo and Sonora. On February 27, 1941, the West Texas Woolen Mills plant in Eldorado held a grand opening, with a parade and BBQ lunch. About 5,000 people attended. Governor "Pappy" W. Lee O'Daniel was the guest speaker.

Oilfield discoveries on school lands in the 1950s enabled Schleicher County to build new library and gymnasium facilities for its students.

== Geography ==
According to the U.S. Census Bureau, the county has a total area of 1,311 square miles (3,400 km^{2}).

=== Major highways ===
- U.S. Highway 190
- U.S. Highway 277

=== Adjacent counties ===
- Tom Green County (north)
- Menard County (east)
- Sutton County (south)
- Crockett County (west)
- Irion County (northwest)
- Kimble County (southeast)

== Demographics ==
Historical population
Census	Pop.	Note	%±
1890	155		—
1900	515		232.3%
1910	1,893		267.6%
1920	1,851		−2.2%
1930	3,166		71.0%
1940	3,083		−2.6%
1950	2,852		−7.5%
1960	2,791		−2.1%
1970	2,277		−18.4%
1980	2,820		23.8%
1990	2,990		6.0%
2000	2,935		−1.8%
2010	3,461		17.9%
2020	2,451		−29.2%
2025 (est.)	2,245	▼	−8.4%
U.S. Decennial Census; 1850–2010 2010 2020

=== Racial and ethnic composition ===
Schleicher County, Texas – Racial and ethnic composition Note: the US Census treats Hispanic/Latino as an ethnic category. This table excludes Latinos from the racial categories and assigns them to a separate category. Hispanics/Latinos may be of any race.
Race / ethnicity (NH = Non-Hispanic)	Pop 1980	Pop 1990	Pop 2000	Pop 2010	Pop 2020	% 1980	% 1990	% 2000	% 2010	% 2020
White alone (NH)	2,035	1,898	1,595	1,872	1,102	72.16%	63.48%	54.34%	54.09%	44.96%
Black or African American alone (NH)	41	24	32	32	15	1.45%	0.80%	1.09%	0.92%	0.61%
Native American or Alaska Native alone (NH)	6	2	1	1	4	0.21%	0.07%	0.03%	0.03%	0.16%
Asian alone (NH)	4	0	5	4	7	0.14%	0.00%	0.17%	0.12%	0.29%
Native Hawaiian or Pacific Islander alone (NH)	x	x	1	0	2	x	x	0.03%	0.00%	0.08%
Other race alone (NH)	1	4	7	0	10	0.04%	0.13%	0.24%	0.00%	0.41%
Mixed race or Multiracial (NH)	x	x	16	16	36	x	x	0.55%	0.46%	1.47%
Hispanic or Latino (any race)	733	1,062	1,278	1,536	1,275	25.99%	35.52%	43.54%	44.38%	52.02%
Total	2,820	2,990	2,935	3,461	2,451	100.00%	100.00%	100.00%	100.00%	100.00%

=== 2020 census ===
As of the 2020 census, the county had a population of 2,451. The median age was 45.1 years; 23.8% of the residents were under 18 and 23.3% were 65 or older. For every 100 females, there were 98.5 males, and for every 100 females 18 and over, there were 95.5 males 18 and over.

The racial makeup of the county as of the 2020 census was 55.8% White, 1.1% Black or African American, 1.0% American Indian and Alaska Native, 0.4% Asian, 0.1% Native Hawaiian and Pacific Islander, 27.1% from some other race, and 14.5% from two or more races. Hispanic or Latino residents of any race comprised 52.0% of the population.

The 2020 census reported that fewer than 0.1% of residents lived in urban areas, while almost 100.0% lived in rural areas.

As of the 2020 census, 991 households were in the county, of which 31.5% had children under 18 living in them, 51.7% were married-couple households, 18.5% were households with a male householder and no spouse or partner present, and 23.7% were households with a female householder and no spouse or partner present. About 24.5% of all households were made up of individuals, and 12.6% had someone living alone who was 65 or older.

The 2020 census counted 1,285 housing units, of which 22.9% were vacant. Among occupied housing units, 77.7% were owner-occupied and 22.3% were renter-occupied. The homeowner vacancy rate was 1.4% and the rental vacancy rate was 6.3%.

Between 2010 and 2020, the county's population decreased to 2,451, a 29.2% decline that was the second-largest among the 3,138 U.S. counties.

=== 2000 census ===
As of the 2000 census, 2,935 people, 1,115 households, and 817 families resided in the county. The population density was about two people per square mile (0.77 people/km^{2}). The 1,371 housing units averaged about one units per square mile (0.39 units/km^{2}). The racial makeup of the county was 76.59% White, 1.53% African American, 0.07% Native American, 0.17% Asian, 0.03% Pacific Islander, 18.98% from other races, and 2.62% from two or more races. About 43.54% of the population was Hispanic or Latino of any race.

Of the 1,115 households, 34.3% had children under the age of 18 living with them, 62.6% were married couples living together, 7.5% had a female householder with no husband present, and 26.7% were not families; 25.4% of all households were made up of individuals, and 12.8% had someone living alone who was 65 years of age or older. The average household size was 2.59 and the average family size was 3.12.

In the county, the population was distributed as 27.9% under the age of 18, 7.3% from 18 to 24, 24.0% from 25 to 44, 24.4% from 45 to 64, and 16.4% who were 65 or older. The median age was 39 years. For every 100 females, there were 98.8 males. For every 100 females 18 and over, there were 94.9 males.

The median income for a household in the county was $29,746, and for a family was $37,813. Males had a median income of $28,412 versus $22,250 for females. The per capita income for the county was $15,969. About 16.0% of families and 21.5% of the population were below the poverty line, including 29.00% of those under age 18 and 19.90% of those age 65 or over.

== Communities ==
=== Cities ===
- Eldorado (county seat)

=== Unincorporated communities ===
- Adams
- Hulldale

== Politics ==
United States presidential election results for Schleicher County, Texas
Year	Republican		Democratic		Third party(ies)	
Year	No.	%	No.	%	No.	%
1912	3	2.03%	124	83.78%	21	14.19%
1916	10	5.65%	163	92.09%	4	2.26%
1920	81	26.64%	211	69.41%	12	3.95%
1924	118	32.33%	246	67.40%	1	0.27%
1928	227	62.36%	137	37.64%	0	0.00%
1932	76	12.84%	516	87.16%	0	0.00%
1936	78	14.23%	469	85.58%	1	0.18%
1940	117	16.30%	601	83.70%	0	0.00%
1944	84	12.09%	520	74.82%	91	13.09%
1948	107	16.59%	495	76.74%	43	6.67%
1952	628	59.87%	421	40.13%	0	0.00%
1956	471	58.08%	336	41.43%	4	0.49%
1960	455	56.24%	351	43.39%	3	0.37%
1964	388	42.97%	514	56.92%	1	0.11%
1968	396	41.60%	378	39.71%	178	18.70%
1972	630	71.51%	250	28.38%	1	0.11%
1976	516	51.96%	468	47.13%	9	0.91%
1980	672	59.42%	444	39.26%	15	1.33%
1984	854	71.95%	326	27.46%	7	0.59%
1988	653	56.44%	494	42.70%	10	0.86%
1992	452	36.72%	420	34.12%	359	29.16%
1996	587	48.67%	505	41.87%	114	9.45%
2000	826	70.42%	338	28.82%	9	0.77%
2004	1,012	76.15%	312	23.48%	5	0.38%
2008	970	74.39%	324	24.85%	10	0.77%
2012	787	77.38%	221	21.73%	9	0.88%
2016	821	77.53%	208	19.64%	30	2.83%
2020	940	81.10%	211	18.21%	8	0.69%
2024	906	81.77%	192	17.33%	10	0.90%

United States Senate election results for Schleicher County, Texas1
Year	Republican		Democratic		Third party(ies)	
Year	No.	%	No.	%	No.	%
2024	872	79.42%	205	18.67%	21	1.91%

United States Senate election results for Schleicher County, Texas2
Year	Republican		Democratic		Third party(ies)	
Year	No.	%	No.	%	No.	%
2020	927	81.89%	191	16.87%	14	1.24%

Texas Gubernatorial election results for Schleicher County
Year	Republican		Democratic		Third party(ies)	
Year	No.	%	No.	%	No.	%
2022	834	82.74%	159	15.77%	15	1.49%

== Education ==
All parts of the county are in the Schleicher Independent School District.

All of Schleicher County is in the service area of Howard County Junior College District.

== See also ==
- List of museums in Central Texas
- National Register of Historic Places listings in Schleicher County, Texas
- Recorded Texas Historic Landmarks in Schleicher County
