= Eldorado, Texas =

City in and county seat of Schleicher County, Texas, United States

- City
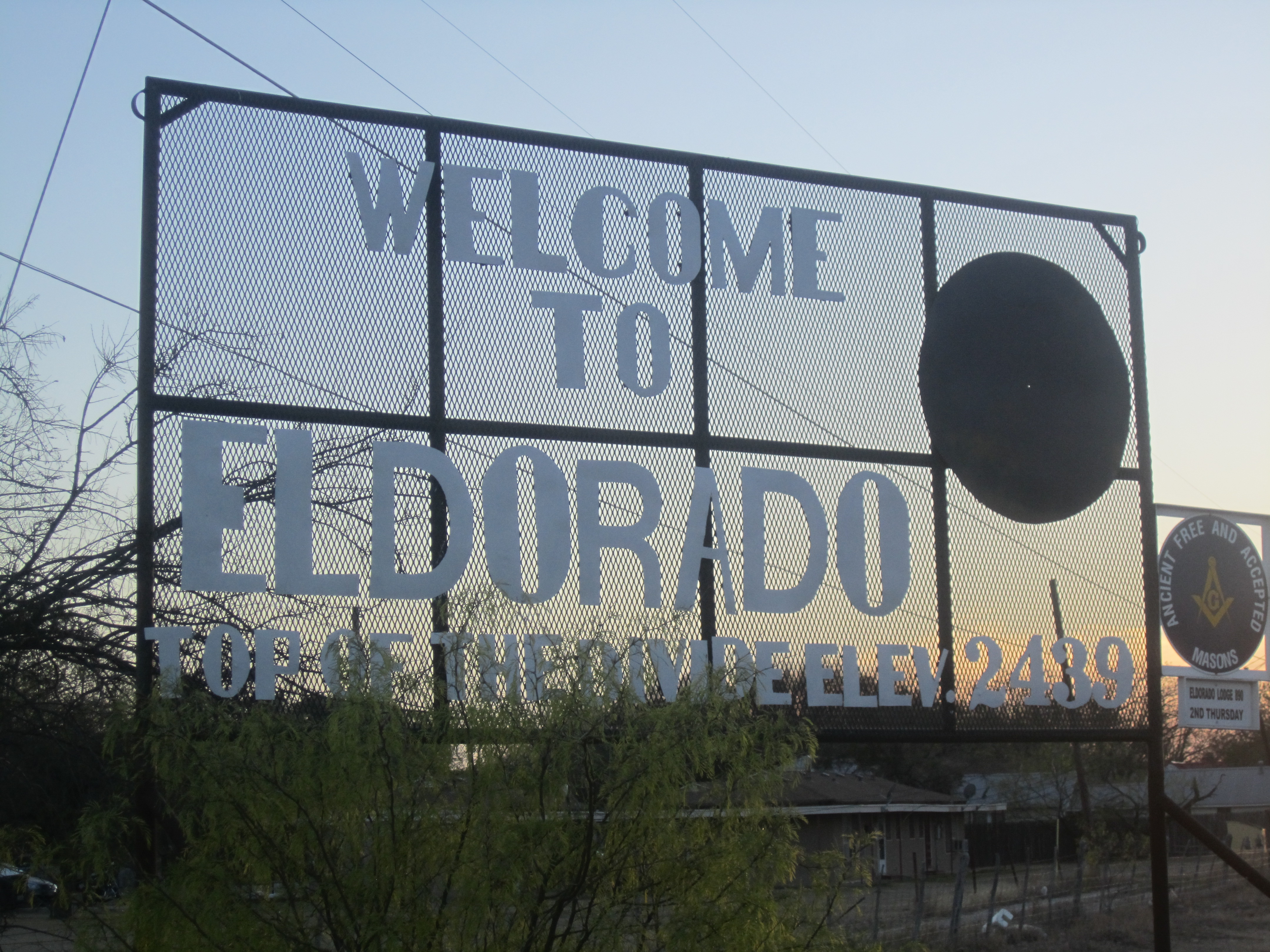
- Eldorado welcome sign

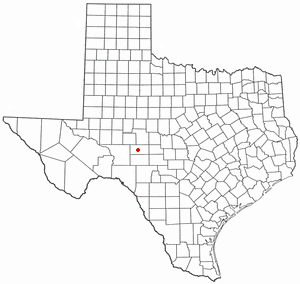
- Location of Eldorado, Texas

- Coordinates: 30°51′39″N 100°35′54″W
- Country: United States
- State: Texas
- County: Schleicher
- Established: 1895

Government
  - Type: Mayor–council
  - Body: City Council
  - Mayor: Oscar Martinez

Area
  - Total: 1.39 sq mi (3.61 km^{2})
  - Land: 1.39 sq mi (3.61 km^{2})
  - Water: 0 sq mi (0.00 km^{2})
- Elevation: 2,438 ft (743 m)

Population (2020)
  - Total: 1,574
  - Density: 1,130/sq mi (436/km^{2})
- Time zone: UTC-6 (Central (CST))
  - Summer (DST): UTC-5 (CDT)
- ZIP code: 76936
- Area code: 325
- FIPS code: 48-22960
- GNIS feature ID: 1356891
- Website: www.eldorado-texas.com

Eldorado (/ˌɛl dəˈrɑːdoʊ/ EL-də-RAH-doh, /-ˈreɪdoʊ/ -RAY-doh) is the only city in and the county seat of Schleicher County, Texas, United States. The population was 1,574 at the 2020 census. Eldorado is located on U.S. Highway 277, some 21 miles (34 km) north of Sonora and 43 miles (69 km) south of San Angelo, Texas.

== History ==
The location of present-day Eldorado was part of a land grant made by the state of Texas in 1878 to the Houston East and West Texas Railroad Company for the construction of a railroad. The land ended up being unused, and in 1895, W. B. Silliman acquired a stake in the area and established a townsite that he named Eldorado. He attracted residents from the nearby town of Verand by promising them free lots. A post office was opened in the same year and in 1896, the town had a population of 100.

Eldorado was chosen as the county seat of Schleicher County in 1901. In 1914, the town had a population of 500. The city voted to incorporate in 1925, but reversed their decision in 1927, only to vote again to incorporate in 1929. In 1930, the Kansas City, Mexico and Orient Railway was built through the town.

== Geography ==
Eldorado is located at 30°51′39″N 100°35′54″W (30.860746, −100.598329).

According to the United States Census Bureau, the city has a total area of 1.4 square miles (3.6 km^{2}), all land.

=== Climate ===
Climate data for Eldorado, Texas (1991–2020)
Month	Jan	Feb	Mar	Apr	May	Jun	Jul	Aug	Sep	Oct	Nov	Dec	Year
Mean daily maximum °F (°C)	57.7 (14.3)	62.6 (17.0)	70.0 (21.1)	78.1 (25.6)	84.8 (29.3)	90.6 (32.6)	92.7 (33.7)	93.1 (33.9)	86.4 (30.2)	77.7 (25.4)	66.1 (18.9)	59.4 (15.2)	76.6 (24.8)
Daily mean °F (°C)	44.9 (7.2)	49.2 (9.6)	56.3 (13.5)	64.1 (17.8)	72.0 (22.2)	78.3 (25.7)	80.5 (26.9)	80.6 (27.0)	74.3 (23.5)	65.0 (18.3)	53.8 (12.1)	46.7 (8.2)	63.8 (17.7)
Mean daily minimum °F (°C)	32.2 (0.1)	35.8 (2.1)	42.6 (5.9)	50.1 (10.1)	59.2 (15.1)	66.1 (18.9)	68.3 (20.2)	68.1 (20.1)	62.2 (16.8)	52.3 (11.3)	41.4 (5.2)	34.1 (1.2)	51.0 (10.6)
Average precipitation inches (mm)	0.84 (21)	1.14 (29)	1.43 (36)	1.49 (38)	2.89 (73)	2.15 (55)	1.74 (44)	2.56 (65)	2.56 (65)	2.76 (70)	1.23 (31)	1.11 (28)	21.9 (555)
Average snowfall inches (cm)	0.6 (1.5)	0.3 (0.76)	0.0 (0.0)	0.0 (0.0)	0.0 (0.0)	0.0 (0.0)	0.0 (0.0)	0.0 (0.0)	0.0 (0.0)	0.0 (0.0)	0.0 (0.0)	0.2 (0.51)	1.1 (2.77)
Source: NOAA

== Demographics ==
=== 2020 census ===
As of the 2020 census, Eldorado had a population of 1,574 people living in 631 households.

The median age was 39.5 years; 26.4% of the residents under 18 and 19.0% were 65 or older. For every 100 females, there were 98.2 males, and for every 100 females 18 and over, there were 93.6 males.

Of the occupied households, 35.2% had children under 18 living in them, 45.3% were married-couple households, 19.5% had a male householder with no spouse or partner present, 27.4% had a female householder with no spouse or partner present, and about 26.0% were made up of individuals; 14.0% had someone living alone who was 65 or older.

The city had 765 housing units, of which 17.5% were vacant. The homeowner vacancy rate was 2.3% and the rental vacancy rate was 6.3%.

None of the residents lived in urban areas, while 100.0% lived in rural areas.

Racial composition as of the 2020 census
Race	Number	Percentage
White	700	44.5%
Black or African American	23	1.5%
American Indian and Alaska Native	13	0.8%
Asian	9	0.6%
Native Hawaiian and other Pacific Islander	3	0.2%
Some other race	581	36.9%
Two or more races	245	15.6%
Hispanic or Latino (of any race)	1,047	66.5%

=== 2000 census ===
Historical population
Census	Pop.	Note	%±
1930	1,404		—
1940	1,530		9.0%
1950	1,663		8.7%
1960	1,815		9.1%
1970	1,446		−20.3%
1980	2,061		42.5%
1990	2,019		−2.0%
2000	1,951		−3.4%
2010	1,951		0.0%
2020	1,574		−19.3%
U.S. Decennial Census

As of the census of 2000, 1,951 people, 712 households, and 513 families resided in the city. The population density was 1,408 inhabitants per square mile (544/km^{2}). The 838 housing units had an average density of 604.6 per square mile (233.4/km^{2}). The racial makeup of the city was 70.63% White, 2.15% African American, 0.10% Native American, 0.26% Asian, 0.05% Pacific Islander, 24.24% from other races, and 2.56% from two or more races. Hispanics or Latinos of any race were 53.92% of the population.

Of the 712 households, 37.9% had children under 18 living with them, 58.7% were married couples living together, 10.0% had a female householder with no husband present, and 27.9% were not families. About 26.3% of all households were made up of individuals, and 13.1% had someone living alone who was 65 or older. The average household size was 2.67 and the average family size was 3.26.

In the city, the population was distributed as 30.4% under 18, 7.7% from 18 to 24, 24.7% from 25 to 44, 21.3% from 45 to 64, and 16.0% who were 65 or older. The median age was 36 years. For every 100 females, there were 96.9 males. For every 100 females 18 and over, there were 89.4 males.

The median income in the city for a household was $27,682 and for a family was $30,781. Males had a median income of $26,172 versus $18,750 for females. The per capita income for the city was $12,994. About 20.8% of families and 26.1% of the population were below the poverty line, including 35.6% of those under 18 and 26.2% of those 65 or over.

== Education ==
The City of Eldorado is served by the Schleicher County Independent School District, as are all other parts of the county. The comprehensive high school is Eldorado High School.

All of Schleicher County is in the service area of Howard County Junior College District.

== Yearning for Zion Ranch ==
Eldorado was the nearest city to the Yearning for Zion Ranch (YFZ Ranch), the headquarters of the Fundamentalist Church of Jesus Christ of Latter Day Saints headed by convicted sex offender felon Warren Jeffs. More than 400 children were removed from the compound in April 2008 by Texas Child Protective Services. Hundreds of children were taken into custody and temporarily placed into foster homes. The children were returned to their mothers shortly afterward.

== Media portrayals ==
The movie El Dorado, starring John Wayne and Robert Mitchum, takes place in a fictional "El Dorado" during the late 1800s. The real town of Eldorado did not exist until 1895, well after the date of John Wayne's fictional adventure. Eldorado and The Eldorado Success were shown in the 2022 Netflix documentary Keep Sweet: Pray and Obey about the FLDS community.

== Gallery ==
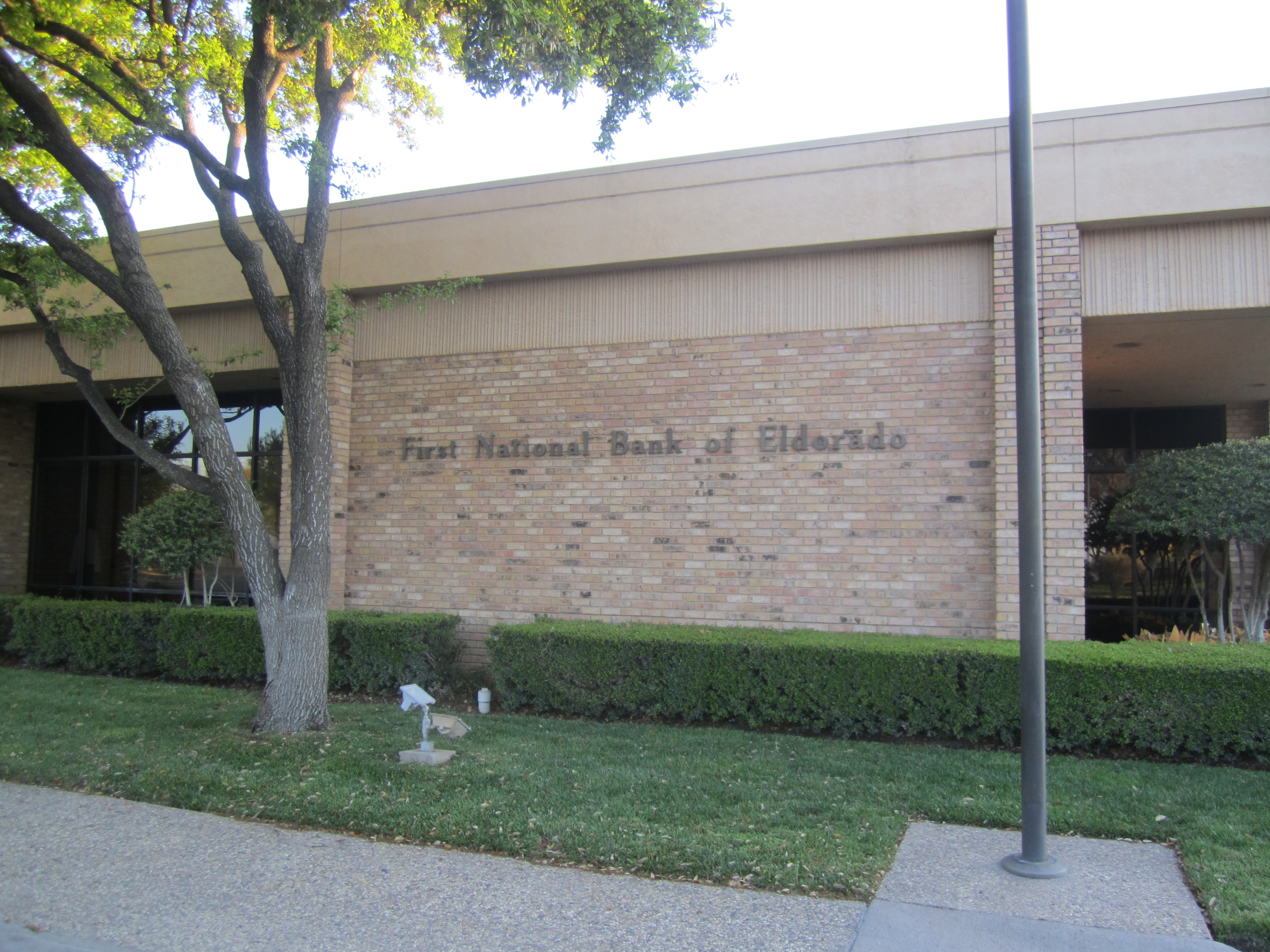
First National Bank of Eldorado

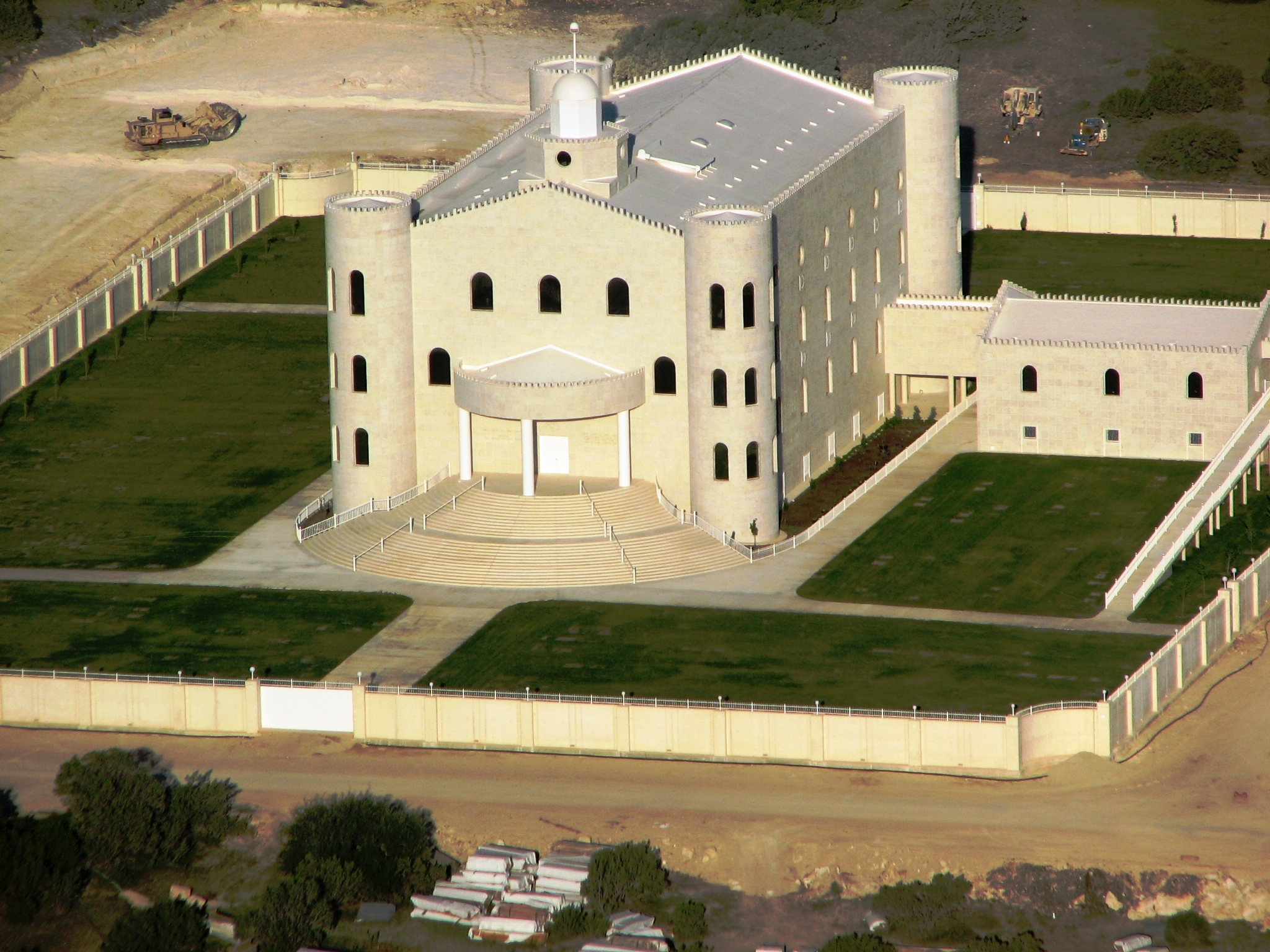
FLDS Temple just outside Eldorado

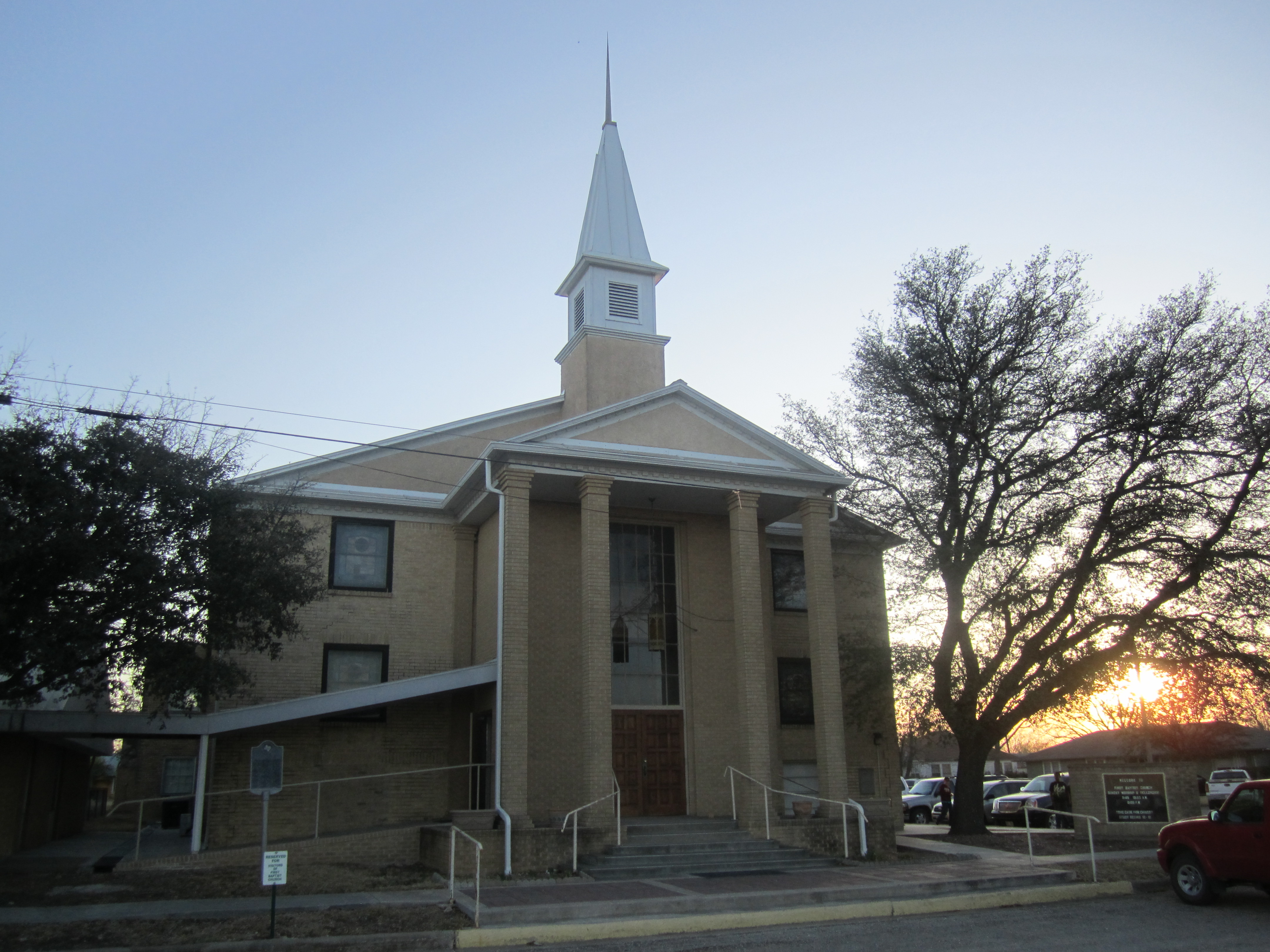
First Baptist Church of Eldorado

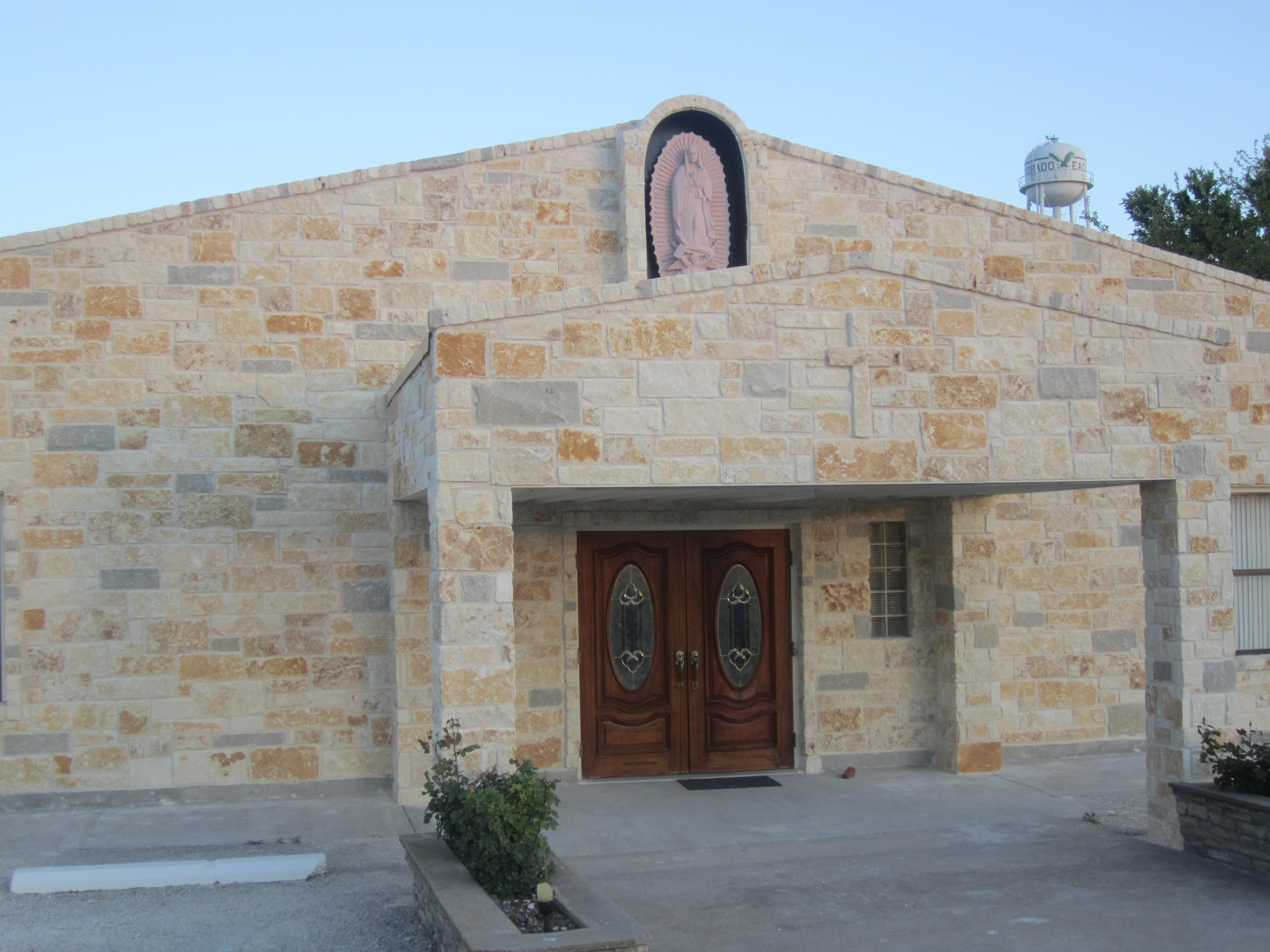
Our Lady of Guadalupe Catholic Church off U.S. Highway 277 in Eldorado

== See also ==
- List of municipalities in Texas
