= Elections in Texas =

From 1836 to 1845, Texas existed as an independent Republic of Texas and elected its own presidents before agreeing to annexation by the United States in 1845. Ever since, the state of Texas began participating in every presidential election with the exceptions of 1864 and 1868. The reason Texas chose not to participate in these two elections was due to its secession from the Union to join the Confederate States of America on February 1, 1861, and later remained as an unreconstructed state following in the American Civil War.

Following annexation, Texas began an election system that was quite similar to other U.S. states, with early constitutions establishing offices for governor, judges, and legislators. Records from the Legislative reference library also documented every governor from 1846 and on. The state's election laws codified in the Texas Election Code in some ways included primary election rules and vote thresholds.

Texas holds its statewide elections including the gubernatorial race as well as other state offices. Every four years these elections are held on the nationwide Election Day, the Tuesday following the first Monday in November. They occur in even numbered years that are not divisible by four, meaning they take place during a midterm and don't coincide with the presidential elections. The Texas House of Representatives hold their election every two years, while the Texas Senate seats are more staggered. About half the chamber is elected in each two-year cycle with the exception of years where there has been redistricting and all the seats are contested.

For about a century, Texas politics was dominated by the Democratic party, making the state a part of the Solid South which was the "electoral voting bloc for the Democratic Party in the Southern United States between the end of the Reconstruction era in 1877". In a reversal of alignments, since the late 1960s, the Republican Party has grown more prominent. By the 1990s, it became the state's dominant political party and remains so to this day, as Democrats have not won a statewide race since the 1994 Lieutenant gubernatorial election. Texas is a majority Republican state with Republicans controlling every statewide office. Texas Republicans have majorities in the State House and Senate, an entirely Republican Texas Supreme Court, control of both Senate seats in the US Congress. Texas is America's most-populous Republican state. There have been arguments that Texas has trended more competitive since 2016 by citing demographic change, urban population growth, and narrowing statewide margins. The 2020 presidential election saw Texas become the third closest state won by republicans, illustrating both the party's strength and the state's gradual movement towards competitiveness.

Texas, simultaneous to Wyoming, was the first state to elect a woman governor in 1924 with the election of Miriam A. Ferguson. (Huddleston, 2003) As of the 2026 midterm elections, Texas has elected the first person of color to be their governor, Gina Hinojosa.

In a 2020 study led by political science researcher Scot Schraufnagel, Texas was ranked as the hardest state for citizens to vote in due to strict pre-registration laws and in-person voter registration deadlines. Additionally, by the 2020 election, Texas had cut down the number of polling stations in the state, making voting less widely available.

== Voting system and methods ==
United States presidential election results for Texas
Year	Republican / Whig		Democratic		Third party(ies)	
Year	No.	%	No.	%	No.	%
1848	4,509	29.71%	10,668	70.29%	0	0.00%
1852	4,995	26.93%	13,552	73.07%	0	0.00%
1856	0	0.00%	31,169	66.59%	15,639	33.41%
1860	0	0.00%	0	0.00%	62,986	100.00%
1872	47,468	40.71%	66,546	57.07%	2,580	2.21%
1876	44,800	29.96%	104,755	70.04%	0	0.00%
1880	57,893	23.95%	156,428	64.71%	27,405	11.34%
1884	93,141	28.63%	225,309	69.26%	6,855	2.11%
1888	88,422	24.73%	234,883	65.70%	34,208	9.57%
1892	81,144	19.22%	239,148	56.65%	101,853	24.13%
1896	167,520	30.75%	370,434	68.00%	6,832	1.25%
1900	130,641	30.83%	267,432	63.12%	25,633	6.05%
1904	51,242	21.90%	167,200	71.45%	15,566	6.65%
1908	65,666	22.35%	217,302	73.97%	10,789	3.67%
1912	28,530	9.45%	219,489	72.73%	53,769	17.82%
1916	64,999	17.45%	286,514	76.92%	20,948	5.62%
1920	114,538	23.54%	288,767	59.34%	83,336	17.12%
1924	130,023	19.78%	484,605	73.70%	42,881	6.52%
1928	367,036	51.77%	341,032	48.10%	931	0.13%
1932	97,959	11.35%	760,348	88.06%	5,119	0.59%
1936	104,661	12.32%	739,952	87.08%	5,123	0.60%
1940	212,692	18.91%	909,974	80.92%	1,865	0.17%
1944	191,425	16.64%	821,605	71.42%	137,301	11.94%
1948	303,467	24.29%	824,235	65.97%	121,730	9.74%
1952	1,102,878	53.13%	969,228	46.69%	3,840	0.18%
1956	1,080,619	55.26%	859,958	43.98%	14,968	0.77%
1960	1,121,310	48.52%	1,167,567	50.52%	22,207	0.96%
1964	958,566	36.49%	1,663,185	63.32%	5,060	0.19%
1968	1,227,844	39.87%	1,266,804	41.14%	584,758	18.99%
1972	2,298,896	66.20%	1,154,291	33.24%	19,527	0.56%
1976	1,953,300	47.97%	2,082,319	51.14%	36,265	0.89%
1980	2,510,705	55.28%	1,881,147	41.42%	149,785	3.30%
1984	3,433,428	63.61%	1,949,276	36.11%	14,867	0.28%
1988	3,036,829	55.95%	2,352,748	43.35%	37,833	0.70%
1992	2,496,071	40.56%	2,281,815	37.08%	1,376,132	22.36%
1996	2,736,167	48.76%	2,459,683	43.83%	415,794	7.41%
2000	3,799,639	59.30%	2,433,746	37.98%	174,252	2.72%
2004	4,526,917	61.09%	2,832,704	38.22%	51,144	0.69%
2008	4,479,328	55.38%	3,528,633	43.63%	79,830	0.99%
2012	4,569,843	57.13%	3,308,124	41.35%	121,690	1.52%
2016	4,685,047	52.09%	3,877,868	43.12%	430,940	4.79%
2020	5,890,347	52.01%	5,259,126	46.44%	175,813	1.55%
2024	6,393,597	56.03%	4,835,250	42.37%	182,952	1.60%

To reduce the amount of time required to fill electoral vacancies, Texas conducts special elections, which is to fill an office that has become vacant between general elections. Texas has dispensed with party primaries, instead using a jungle primary system. Candidates of all parties (or no party) appear on the same ballot; if no single one of them receives 50 percent plus 1 vote, the two highest vote-getters also advance to a runoff irrespective of party affiliation.

Texas sets three uniform election dates each year: the first Saturday in May, the first Tuesday after the first Monday in November, and for partisan primary elections the first Tuesday in March in even-numbered years. By the 2020 election cycle, Texas had reduced the number of polling locations across the state, this development was noted by researchers as it made access to in person voting less consistent.

As of 2024, 99.5 percent of registered voters in Texas are in jurisdictions that use voting methods capable of producing an auditable paper ballot, reflecting an established best practice for recounts and audits. Only 0.5 percent of Texas voters continue to use direct recording electronic machines (DREs) without a paper record of each vote, as the states transition to paper based voting technologies. Paper ballots marked by hand are shown to "create a tangible, tamper-evident and auditable record of voter selections". These practices operate within the Texas Election Code, which governs election dates, recounts, and rules.

Voting rights in Texas

Demographics
- Poll taxes: Abolished 1964
- Literacy tests abolished: N/A
- Minimum voting age: 18
- Preregistration age: 17 and 10 months
- Felon voting status: No, unless sentence fully discharged or pardoned

Voter registration
- Voter registration required: Yes
- Online voter registration: No
- Automatic voter registration: No
- Same-day registration: No
- Partisan affiliation: No (open primary state)

Voting process
- Polling place identification requirements: Yes, 7 accepted forms of photo ID: Texas Driver License Texas Election Identification Certificate Texas Personal Identification Card Texas Handgun License United States Military Identification Card containing the person’s photograph United States Citizenship Certificate containing the person’s photograph United States Passport (book or card)
- In-person early-voting status: 17 days prior up to 4 days before
- Out-of-precinct voting status: In select counties approved by Secretary of State of Texas
- Postal ballot status: Limited to those with one of 6 acceptable excuses: 65 years of age or older Sick or disabled Expecting to give birth within three weeks of Election Day Absent from the county of registration during the Early Voting period and on Election Day Civilly committed under Chapter 841 of the Texas Health and Safety Code Confined in jail, but otherwise eligible.
- Permanent list postal ballot status: Apply yearly if disabled or 65+
- Ballot collection status: Household member, relative, or lawful assistant
- Straight-ticket device status: no
- Election method: First past the post

Voter powers
- Redistricting system: Computer generated districts voted on by state legislature
- Prison-based redistricting: Yes
- Ballot question rights: No
- Recall powers: Only local offices in Home Rule cities that have included recall in their charter
- Federal representation level: State level

== Voting rights and voter powers ==
=== Procedure ===
Texas uses an open primary system for all partisan offices, allowing voters to participate in either party's primary regarding affiliation. Counties are able to choose between separate or joint primaries. In this system, voters may vote in either party's primary, without being affiliated with said party. In counties with joint primaries, both parties hold their primaries at the same time and location, and voters must inform election officials which party primary they would rather participate in.

If a runoff election is needed, voters may only participate in the runoff of the party they affiliated with in the primary (but if they did not vote in the primary, they may still vote in the runoff election and, if both parties are holding runoffs, may choose either one). Party affiliation for voting purposes expires at the end of the voting year in which affiliation was established.

=== History ===
In 1914, a failed ballot measure would have given Texas citizens initiative and referendum powers.

Women in Texas were denied the right to vote until 1918, when the Texas Legislature passed a law that allowed women to vote in primary elections only. Shortly after, Texas ratified the 19th Amendment which stopped states from denying the right to vote to citizens of the United States on the basis of sex. This ultimately extended full suffrage to women in all elections.

In 1870, the 15th Amendment was passed and people of color were permitted to vote in the U.S. However, African Americans continued to be oppressed when Texas allowed the Democratic Party to prevent them from voting in primary elections with The White Primary Law. After that law was overruled by the U.S. Supreme Court, Texas Democrats enacted a rule that would not allow Black people to join the Democratic Party. Once again, the Supreme Court overruled this decision, and soon after, the Voting Rights Act of 1965 ultimately secured voting right protections for African Americans in Texas.

In addition, Texas began providing voting materials in Spanish in 1975 to accommodate voters who were not fluent in English. Congress had found that the lack of translated ballots for Spanish-speakers prevented some voters "from voting by their language" and recommended providing Spanish materials, as Texas election law "should follow the Voting Rights Act".

== See also ==
- 2026 Texas elections
- United States presidential elections in Texas
- Political party strength in Texas
- Women's suffrage in Texas
