= 1880 United States presidential election in Michigan =

- November 2, 1880
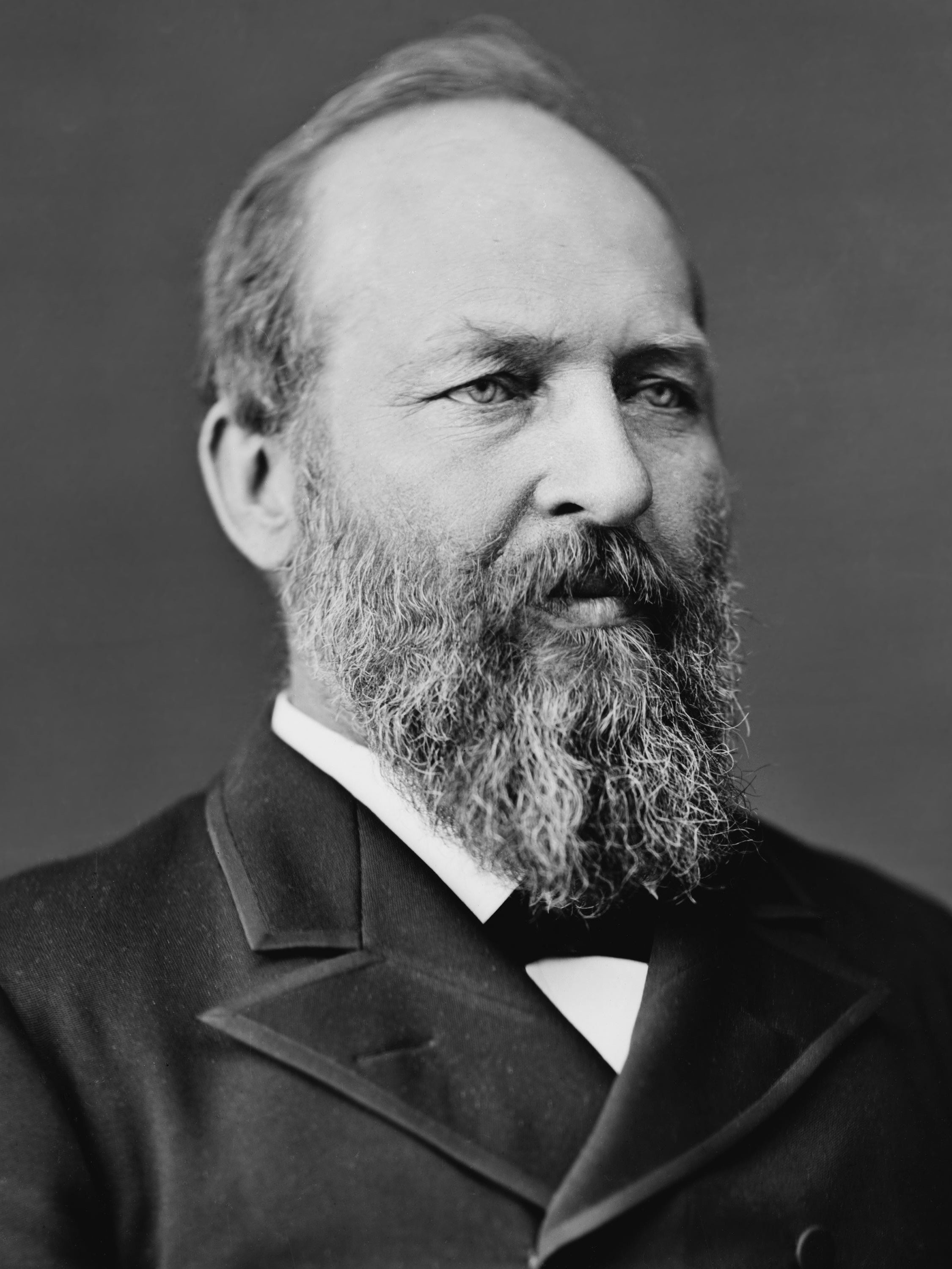

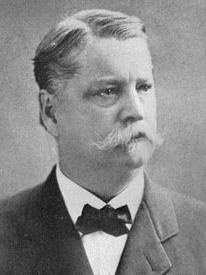

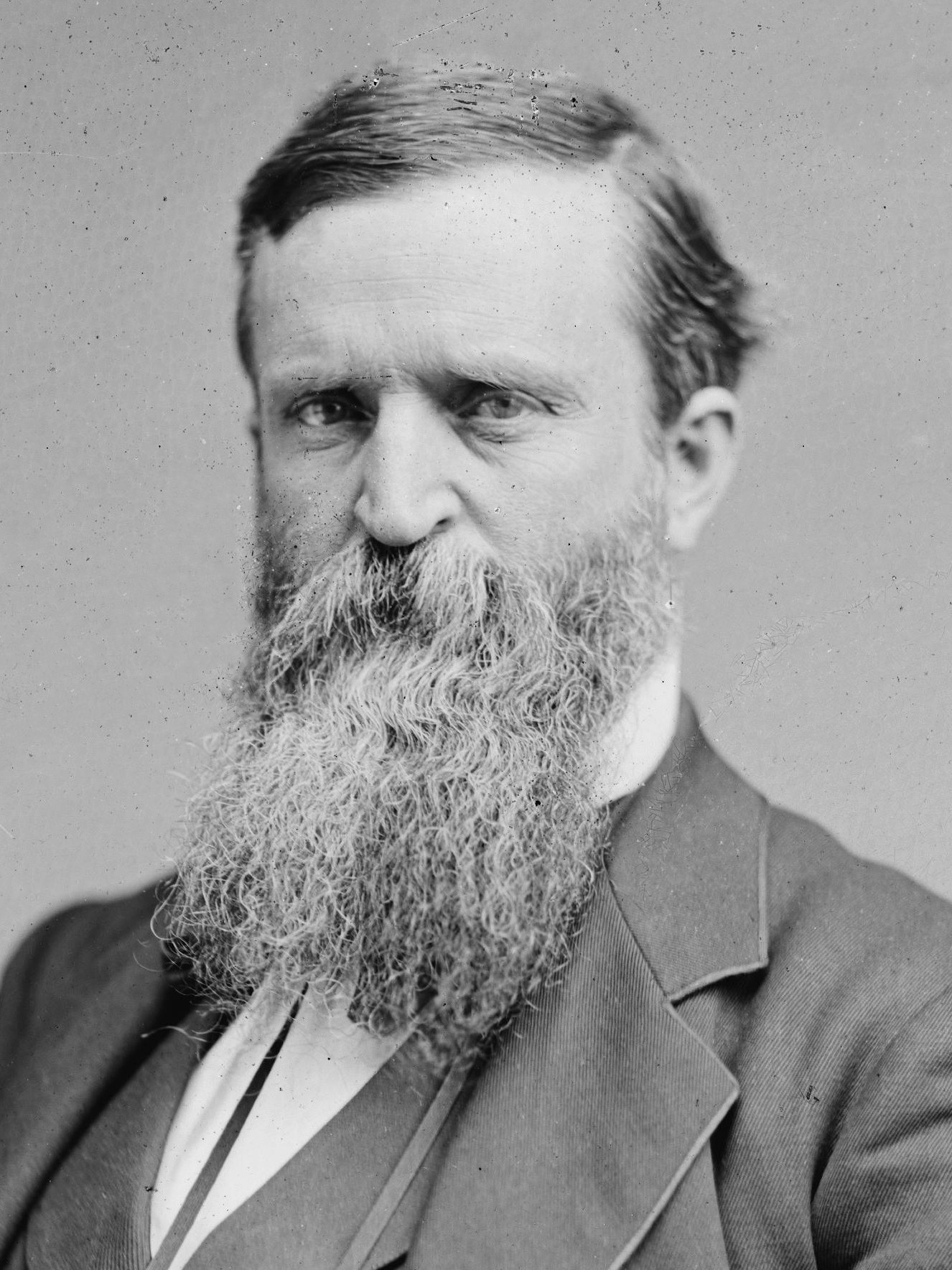
Nominee	James A. Garfield	Winfield Scott Hancock	James B. Weaver
Party	Republican	Democratic	Greenback
Home state	Ohio	Pennsylvania	Iowa
Running mate	Chester A. Arthur	William Hayden English	Barzillai J. Chambers
Electoral vote	11	0	0
Popular vote	185,190	131,301	34,895
Percentage	52.51%	37.23%	9.89%
County results
Garfield
30–40%
40–50%
50–60%
60–70%
70–80%
Hancock
40–50%
50–60%
60–70%
80–90%
President before election
Rutherford B. Hayes
Republican
Elected President
James A. Garfield
Republican

The 1880 United States presidential election in Michigan took place on November 2, 1880, as part of the 1880 United States presidential election. Voters chose 11 electors to the Electoral College, which selected the president and vice president.

Michigan voted for Republican nominees James A. Garfield of Ohio and his running mate Chester A. Arthur over Democratic candidates Winfield Scott Hancock of Pennsylvania and running mate William Hayden English and Greenback candidates James B. Weaver of Iowa and his running mate Barzillai J. Chambers of Texas.

With 9.88% of the popular vote, Michigan would prove to be Weaver's third strongest state in terms of popular vote percentage after Texas and Iowa.

== Results ==
General Election Results
Party	Pledged to	Elector	Votes
Republican Party	James A. Garfield	Watson Beach	185,190
Republican Party	James A. Garfield	Edward H. Butler	185,186
Republican Party	James A. Garfield	David R. Cook	185,185
Republican Party	James A. Garfield	Aaron B. Turner	185,120
Republican Party	James A. Garfield	Charles Duncombe	184,785
Republican Party	James A. Garfield	William H. Potter	184,549
Republican Party	James A. Garfield	Charles B. Peck	182,970
Republican Party	James A. Garfield	Samuel A. Browne	182,752
Republican Party	James A. Garfield	Ira P. Bingham	182,282
Republican Party	James A. Garfield	Charles T. Mitchell	182,184
Republican Party	James A. Garfield	Samuel M. Stephenson	179,775
Democratic Party	Winfield Scott Hancock	Jerome Eddy	131,301
Democratic Party	Winfield Scott Hancock	William Foxen	131,300
Democratic Party	Winfield Scott Hancock	James Dempsey	131,292
Democratic Party	Winfield Scott Hancock	Peter White	131,200
Democratic Party	Winfield Scott Hancock	Germain H. Mason	130,857
Democratic Party	Winfield Scott Hancock	William R. Marsh	130,028
Democratic Party	Winfield Scott Hancock	Hiram J. Beakes	129,887
Democratic Party	Winfield Scott Hancock	Horace B. Peck	128,360
Democratic Party	Winfield Scott Hancock	James S. Upton	125,521
Democratic Party	Winfield Scott Hancock	Wildman Mills	121,410
Democratic Party	Winfield Scott Hancock	Archibald McDonell	114,726
Greenback Party	James B. Weaver	Augustus Day	34,895
Greenback Party	James B. Weaver	Henry W. Beach	34,894
Greenback Party	James B. Weaver	Henry S. Smith	34,894
Greenback Party	James B. Weaver	William A. Berkey	34,839
Greenback Party	James B. Weaver	William F. Hicks	34,531
Greenback Party	James B. Weaver	George W. Stephenson	34,528
Greenback Party	James B. Weaver	Oscar F. Bean	33,728
Greenback Party	James B. Weaver	Asa A. Sheldon	32,835
Greenback Party	James B. Weaver	John R. Hill	32,606
Greenback Party	James B. Weaver	Valentine A. Saph	30,762
Greenback Party	James B. Weaver	Henry T. Farnham	30,695
Prohibition Party	Neal Dow	Charles P. Russell	942
Prohibition Party	Neal Dow	William G. Browne	934
Prohibition Party	Neal Dow	John Boyington	933
Prohibition Party	Neal Dow	James H. Edwards	928
Prohibition Party	Neal Dow	Albert L. Chubb	917
Prohibition Party	Neal Dow	Emory L. Brewer	916
Prohibition Party	Neal Dow	George C. Haskins	893
Prohibition Party	Neal Dow	James G. McKee	881
Prohibition Party	Neal Dow	Joseph P. Whiting	881
Prohibition Party	Neal Dow	Emory Curtiss	875
Prohibition Party	Neal Dow	Edward C. Newell	840
Anti-Masonic Party	John W. Phelps	Charles Derbeyshire	312
Anti-Masonic Party	John W. Phelps	Randall Faurot	312
Anti-Masonic Party	John W. Phelps	Richard Finch	312
Anti-Masonic Party	John W. Phelps	Joel Martin	312
Anti-Masonic Party	John W. Phelps	William Wing	312
Anti-Masonic Party	John W. Phelps	Charles C. Foot	311
Anti-Masonic Party	John W. Phelps	Phillip Phelps	311
Anti-Masonic Party	John W. Phelps	Jacob B. Crall	310
Anti-Masonic Party	John W. Phelps	Sidney P. Cool	310
Anti-Masonic Party	John W. Phelps	Reuben D. Nichol	309
Anti-Masonic Party	John W. Phelps	Isaac J. Gray	276
Write-in		Scattering	61
Votes cast (Note: Based on highest elector on each ticket)			352,701

=== Results By County ===
County	James A. Garfield Republican		Winfield S. Hancock Democratic		James B. Weaver Greenback		Neal Dow Prohibition		John W. Phelps Anti-Masonic		Margin		Total votes cast
County	#	%	#	%	#	%	#	%	#	%	#	%	Total votes cast
Alcona	386	59.66%	252	38.95%	9	1.39%	0	0.00%	0	0.00%	134	20.71%	647
Allegan	4,693	56.34%	2,376	28.52%	1,209	14.51%	4	0.05%	48	0.58%	2,317	27.82%	8,330
Alpena	960	52.40%	834	45.52%	38	2.07%	0	0.00%	0	0.00%	126	6.88%	1,832
Antrim	600	61.92%	153	15.79%	215	22.19%	1	0.10%	0	0.00%	385 (Note: Garfield's margin over Weaver)	39.73%	969
Baraga	173	43.36%	224	56.14%	0	0.00%	2	0.50%	0	0.00%	-51	-12.78%	399
Barry	3,083	49.13%	1,020	16.25%	2,129	33.93%	26	0.41%	17	0.27%	954	15.20%	6,275
Bay	2,404	38.74%	2,068	33.32%	1,734	27.94%	0	0.00%	0	0.00%	336	5.41%	6,206
Benzie	449	58.85%	170	22.28%	142	18.61%	0	0.00%	2	0.26%	279	36.57%	763
Berrien	4,535	52.60%	3,536	41.02%	540	6.26%	7	0.08%	3	0.03%	999	11.59%	8,621
Branch	4,121	59.28%	1,195	17.19%	1,626	23.39%	8	0.12%	2	0.03%	2,495	35.89%	6,952
Calhoun	5,187	56.37%	3,143	34.16%	844	9.17%	26	0.28%	1	0.01%	2,044	22.21%	9,201
Cass	2,859	52.42%	2,180	39.97%	415	7.61%	0	0.00%	0	0.00%	679	12.45%	5,454
Charlevoix	784	67.12%	304	26.03%	78	6.68%	2	0.17%	0	0.00%	480	41.10%	1,168
Cheboygan	606	48.64%	541	43.42%	99	7.95%	0	0.00%	0	0.00%	65	5.22%	1,246
Chippewa	396	53.15%	347	46.58%	2	0.27%	0	0.00%	0	0.00%	49	6.58%	745
Clare	488	54.10%	370	41.02%	44	4.88%	0	0.00%	0	0.00%	118	13.08%	902
Clinton	3,299	48.03%	2,797	40.72%	756	11.01%	12	0.17%	4	0.06%	502	7.31%	6,869 (Note: Includes 1 Scattering vote)
Crawford	183	53.04%	142	41.16%	20	5.80%	0	0.00%	0	0.00%	41	11.88%	345
Delta	708	61.30%	441	38.18%	6	0.52%	0	0.00%	0	0.00%	267	23.12%	1,155
Eaton	4,195	53.98%	2,681	34.50%	809	10.41%	87	1.12%	0	0.00%	1,514	19.48%	7,772
Emmet	814	56.96%	495	34.64%	118	8.26%	2	0.14%	0	0.00%	319	22.32%	1,429
Genesee	4,934	54.76%	3,085 (Note: The 1881 Michigan Manual contains a typo for Hancock in this county)	34.24%	925	10.27%	56	0.62%	10	0.11%	1,849	20.52%	9,010
Gladwin	160	38.83%	243	58.98%	7	1.70%	2	0.49%	0	0.00%	-83	-20.15%	412
Grand Traverse	1,356	73.14%	428	23.09%	70	3.78%	0	0.00%	0	0.00%	928	50.05%	1,854
Gratiot	2,548	50.84%	1,489	29.71%	965	19.25%	7	0.14%	3	0.06%	1,059	21.13%	5,012
Hillsdale	4,909	59.50%	1,951	23.65%	1,365	16.54%	21	0.25%	5	0.06%	2,958	35.85%	8,251
Houghton	2,100	61.48%	1,311	38.38%	0	0.00%	5	0.15%	0	0.00%	789	23.10%	3,416
Huron	1,713	56.93%	1,245	41.38%	42	1.40%	9	0.30%	0	0.00%	468	15.55%	3,009
Ingham	3,984	47.26%	3,412	40.47%	1,005	11.92%	29	0.34%	0	0.00%	572	6.79%	8,430
Ionia	4,210	52.20%	2,542	31.52%	1,257	15.59%	41	0.51%	15	0.19%	1,668	20.68%	8,065
Iosco	809	60.96%	513	38.66%	5	0.38%	0	0.00%	0	0.00%	296	22.31%	1,327
Isabella	1,438	55.98%	996	38.77%	129	5.02%	0	0.00%	5	0.19%	442	17.21%	2,569
Jackson	4,486	44.11%	3,744	36.82%	1,810	17.80%	117	1.15%	0	0.00%	742	7.30%	10,169 (Note: Includes 12 Scattering votes)
Kalamazoo	4,478	55.44%	3,045	37.70%	550	6.81%	2 (Note: The 1881 Michigan Manual contains a typo for Dow in this county)	0.02%	2	0.02%	1,433	17.74%	8,077
Kalkaska	496	71.16%	170	24.39%	31	4.45%	0	0.00%	0	0.00%	326	46.77%	697
Kent	8,313	50.26%	5,115	30.92%	3,037	18.36%	58	0.35%	18	0.11%	3,198	19.33%	16,541
Keweenaw	591	69.28%	262	30.72%	0	0.00%	0	0.00%	0	0.00%	329	38.57%	853
Lake	579	67.96%	266	31.22%	6	0.70%	1	0.12%	0	0.00%	313	36.74%	852
Lapeer	3,440	55.31%	2,606	41.90%	171	2.75%	3	0.05%	0	0.00%	834	13.41%	6,220
Leelanau	594	48.61%	545	44.60%	83	6.79%	0	0.00%	0	0.00%	49	4.01%	1,222
Lenawee	6,451	52.54%	5,246	42.73%	402	3.27%	167	1.36%	10	0.08%	1,205	9.81%	12,278 (Note: Includes 2 Scattering votes)
Livingston	2,879	48.36%	2,817	47.32%	231	3.88%	10	0.17%	16	0.27%	62	1.04%	5,953
Mackinac (Note: Not included in official canvass)	145	32.88%	296	67.12%	0	0.00%	0	0.00%	0	0.00%	-151	-34.24%	441
Macomb	3,137	47.77%	3,218	49.00%	201	3.06%	10	0.15%	1	0.02%	-81	-1.23%	6,567
Manistee	1,189	51.70%	870	37.83%	240	10.43%	1	0.04%	0	0.00%	319	13.87%	2,300
Manitou	34	19.65%	139	80.35%	0	0.00%	0	0.00%	0	0.00%	-105	-60.69%	173
Marquette	2,434	65.08%	1,271	33.98%	14	0.37%	21	0.56%	0	0.00%	1,163	31.10%	3,740
Mason	1,267	60.08%	766	36.32%	76	3.60%	0	0.00%	0	0.00%	501	23.76%	2,109
Mecosta	1,621	58.99%	852	31.00%	275	10.01%	0	0.00%	0	0.00%	769	27.98%	2,748
Menominee	1,380	60.90%	880	38.83%	4	0.18%	2	0.09%	0	0.00%	500	22.07%	2,266
Midland	761	49.77%	405	26.49%	355	23.22%	7	0.46%	1	0.07%	356	23.28%	1,529
Missaukee	266	62.74%	121	28.54%	37	8.73%	0	0.00%	0	0.00%	145	34.20%	424
Monroe	3,178	44.67%	3,701	52.02%	224	3.15%	2	0.03%	10	0.14%	-523	-7.35%	7,115
Montcalm	4,163	54.06%	2,770	35.97%	763	9.91%	4	0.05%	0	0.00%	1,393	18.09%	7,700
Muskegon	2,807	57.90%	1,680	34.65%	358	7.38%	3	0.06%	0	0.00%	1,127	23.25%	4,848
Newaygo	1,492	47.79%	625	20.02%	994	31.84%	11	0.35%	0	0.00%	498	15.95%	3,122
Oakland	5,370	49.35%	5,150	47.33%	318	2.92%	37	0.34%	7	0.06%	220	2.02%	10,882
Oceana	1,481	60.06%	482	19.55%	501	20.32%	0	0.00%	2	0.08%	980	39.74%	2,466
Ogemaw	264	51.46%	191	37.23%	58	11.31%	0	0.00%	0	0.00%	73	14.23%	513
Ontonagon	228	48.31%	218	46.19%	25	5.30%	1	0.21%	0	0.00%	10	2.12%	472
Osceola	1,225	66.18%	581	31.39%	23	1.24%	21	1.13%	1	0.05%	644	34.79%	1,851
Otsego	328	51.74%	217	34.23%	81	12.78%	8	1.26%	0	0.00%	111	17.51%	634
Ottawa	3,284	52.93%	2,019	32.54%	784	12.64%	5	0.08%	112	1.81%	1,265	20.39%	6,204
Presque Isle	216	59.83%	145	40.17%	0	0.00%	0	0.00%	0	0.00%	71	19.67%	361
Roscommon	335	32.81%	596	58.37%	90	8.81%	0	0.00%	0	0.00%	-261	-25.56%	1,021
Saginaw	5,207	46.78%	5,304	47.65%	609	5.47%	12	0.11%	0	0.00%	-97	-0.87%	11,132
Sanilac	2,238	60.11%	1,297	34.84%	186	5.00%	2	0.05%	0	0.00%	941	25.28%	3,723
Schoolcraft	157	79.29%	41	20.71%	0	0.00%	0	0.00%	0	0.00%	116	58.59%	198
Shiawassee	3,347	51.39%	1,972	30.28%	1,167	17.92%	26	0.40%	1	0.02%	1,375	21.11%	6,513
St. Clair	4,219	50.09%	3,439	40.83%	758	9.00%	7	0.08%	0	0.00%	780	9.26%	8,423
St. Joseph	3,144	48.33%	2,102	32.31%	1,231	18.92%	1	0.02%	5	0.08%	1,042	16.02%	6,505 (Note: Includes 22 Scattering votes)
Tuscola	2,999	61.47%	1,517	31.09%	358	7.34%	5	0.10%	0	0.00%	1,482	30.38%	4,879
Van Buren	4,131	57.25%	2,004	27.77%	1,062	14.72%	10	0.14%	9	0.12%	2,127	29.48%	7,216
Washtenaw	4,629	46.55%	4,658	49.85%	333	3.35%	23	0.23%	2	0.02%	-329	-3.31%	9,945
Wayne	16,157	50.52%	15,064	47.10%	718	2.25%	18	0.06%	0	0.00%	1,093	3.42%	31,980 (Note: Includes 23 Scattering votes)
Wexford	1,111	67.54%	406	24.68%	128	7.78%	0	0.00%	0	0.00%	705	42.86%	1,645
Total	185,190	52.51%	131,301	37.23%	34,895	9.89%	942	0.27%	312	0.09%	53,889	15.28%	352,701

==== Counties that flipped from Democratic to Republican ====
- Alcona
- Alpena
- Bay
- Cheboygan
- Chippewa
- Emmet
- Jackson
- Livingston
- Oakland
- Ontonagon
- Presque Isle
- Wayne

== See also ==
- United States presidential elections in Michigan
