= 1880 United States presidential election in Iowa =

- November 2, 1880
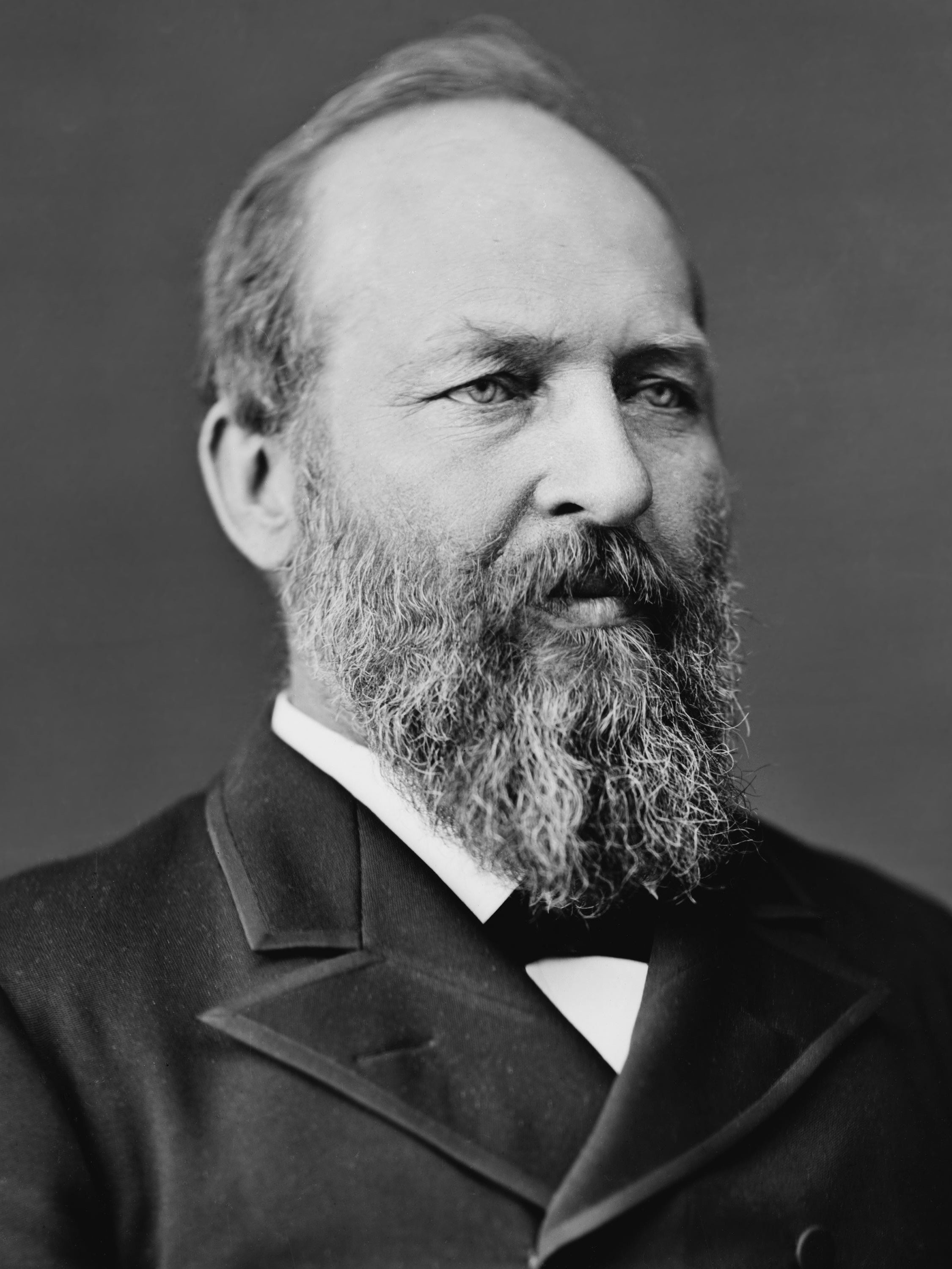

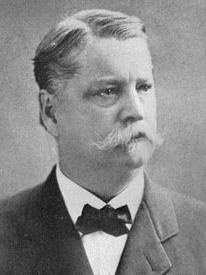

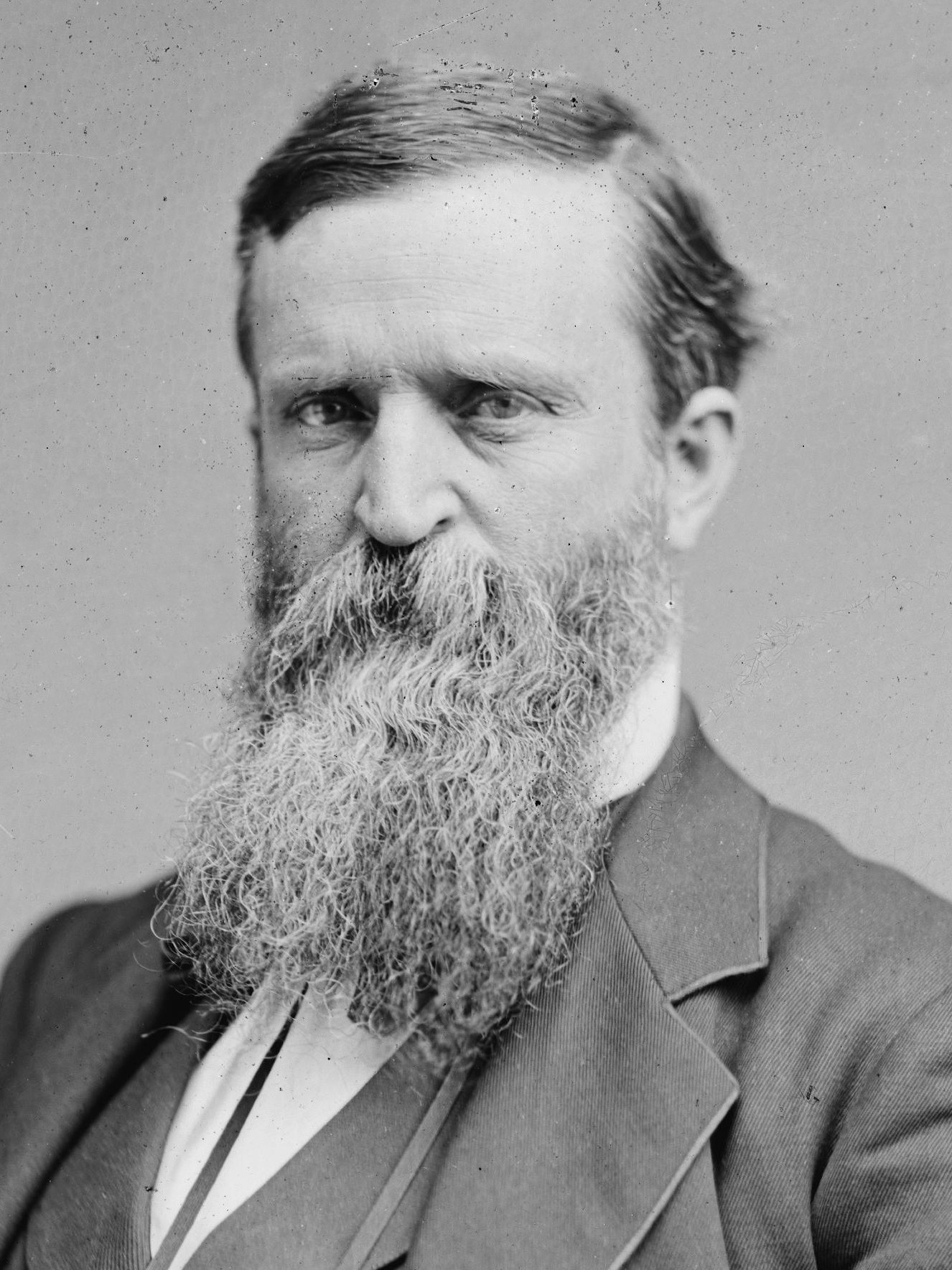
Nominee	James A. Garfield	Winfield Scott Hancock	James B. Weaver
Party	Republican	Democratic	Greenback
Home state	Ohio	Pennsylvania	Iowa
Running mate	Chester A. Arthur	William Hayden English	Barzillai J. Chambers
Electoral vote	11	0	0
Popular vote	183,904	105,845	32,327
Percentage	56.99%	32.80%	10.02%
County results
Garfield
40–50%
50–60%
60–70%
70–80%
80–90%
Hancock
40–50%
50–60%
Weaver
30–40%
President before election
Rutherford B. Hayes
Republican
Elected President
James A. Garfield
Republican

The 1880 United States presidential election in Iowa took place on November 2, 1880, as part of the 1880 United States presidential election. Voters chose 11 representatives, or electors to the Electoral College, who voted for president and vice president.

Iowa voted for the Republican nominee, James A. Garfield, over the Democratic nominee, Winfield Scott Hancock. Garfield won the state by a margin of 24.19%.

With 10.02% of the popular vote, Iowa would prove to be Greenback Party candidate James B. Weaver's second strongest state after Texas.

== Results ==
1880 United States presidential election in Iowa
Party	Candidate	Running mate	Popular vote		Electoral vote	
Party	Candidate	Running mate	Count	%	Count	%
Republican	James Abram Garfield of Ohio	Chester Alan Arthur of New York	183,904	56.99%	11	100.00%
Democratic	Winfield Scott Hancock of Pennsylvania	William Hayden English of Indiana	105,845	32.80%	0	0.00%
Greenback	James Baird Weaver of Iowa	Barzillai Jefferson Chambers of Texas	32,327	10.02%	0	0.00%
Prohibition	Neal Dow of Maine	Henry Adams Thompson of Ohio	592	0.18%	0	0.00%
Total			322,668	100.00%	11	100.00%

=== Results by county ===
County	James Abram Garfield Republican		Winfield Scott Hancock Democratic		James Baird Weaver Greenback		Neal Dow Prohibition		Margin		Total votes cast
County	#	%	#	%	#	%	#	%	#	%	Total votes cast
Adair	1,607	60.83%	515	19.49%	520	19.68%	0	0.00%	1,087 (Note: In this county where Hancock ran third behind Garfield and Weaver, margin given is Garfield vote minus Weaver vote and percentage margin Garfield percentage minus Weaver percentage.)	41.14%	2,642
Adams	1,338	54.48%	581	23.66%	535	21.78%	2	0.08%	757	30.82%	2,456
Allamakee	1,838	49.66%	1,531	41.37%	332	8.97%	0	0.00%	307	8.30%	3,701
Appanoose	1,642	45.43%	1,281	35.45%	691	19.12%	0	0.00%	361	9.99%	3,614
Audubon	963	57.46%	637	38.01%	76	4.53%	0	0.00%	326	19.45%	1,676
Benton	2,948	64.02%	1,372	29.79%	284	6.17%	1	0.02%	1,576	34.22%	4,605
Black Hawk	3,014	64.57%	1,558	33.38%	70	1.50%	26	0.56%	1,456	31.19%	4,668
Boone	2,275	58.04%	1,292	32.96%	352	8.98%	1	0.03%	983	25.08%	3,920
Bremer	1,548	60.19%	707	27.49%	312	12.13%	5	0.19%	841	32.70%	2,572
Buchanan	2,156	55.51%	1,208	31.10%	443	11.41%	77	1.98%	948	24.41%	3,884
Buena Vista	1,058	74.19%	318	22.30%	50	3.51%	0	0.00%	740	51.89%	1,426
Butler	2,072	67.23%	937	30.40%	37	1.20%	36	1.17%	1,135	36.83%	3,082
Calhoun	859	72.86%	301	25.53%	19	1.61%	0	0.00%	558	47.33%	1,179
Carroll	1,189	48.20%	1,169	47.39%	104	4.22%	5	0.20%	20	0.81%	2,467
Cass	2,232	59.82%	1,179	31.60%	314	8.42%	6	0.16%	1,053	28.22%	3,731
Cedar	2,369	59.90%	1,421	35.93%	135	3.41%	30	0.76%	948	23.97%	3,955
Cerro Gordo	1,604	69.71%	677	29.42%	20	0.87%	0	0.00%	927	40.29%	2,301
Cherokee	1,118	68.13%	412	25.11%	100	6.09%	11	0.67%	706	43.02%	1,641
Chickasaw	1,314	47.00%	1,018	36.41%	454	16.24%	10	0.36%	296	10.59%	2,796
Clarke	1,390	58.21%	621	26.01%	377	15.79%	0	0.00%	769	32.20%	2,388
Clay	779	83.94%	137	14.76%	3	0.32%	9	0.97%	642	69.18%	928
Clayton	3,098	55.02%	2,419	42.96%	108	1.92%	6	0.11%	679	12.06%	5,631
Clinton	3,479	51.74%	2,887	42.94%	312	4.64%	46	0.68%	592	8.80%	6,724
Crawford	1,589	62.14%	926	36.21%	42	1.64%	0	0.00%	663	25.93%	2,557
Dallas	2,314	56.19%	517	12.55%	1,286	31.23%	1	0.02%	1,028	24.96%	4,118
Davis	1,143	32.06%	1,207	33.86%	1,215	34.08%	0	0.00%	-8 (Note: In this county where Garfield ran third behind Hancock and Weaver, margin given is Hancock vote minus Weaver vote and percentage margin Hancock percentage minus Weaver percentage.)	-0.22%	3,565
Decatur	1,570	49.78%	948	30.06%	633	20.07%	3	0.10%	622	19.72%	3,154
Delaware	2,396	60.61%	1,489	37.67%	59	1.49%	9	0.23%	907	22.94%	3,953
Des Moines	3,414	53.94%	2,818	44.53%	93	1.47%	4	0.06%	596	9.42%	6,329
Dickinson	325	87.60%	46	12.40%	0	0.00%	0	0.00%	279	75.20%	371
Dubuque	3,007	38.35%	4,576	58.37%	257	3.28%	0	0.00%	-1,569	-20.01%	7,840
Emmet	276	88.18%	28	8.95%	9	2.88%	0	0.00%	248	79.23%	313
Fayette	2,547	54.76%	1,170	25.16%	904	19.44%	30	0.65%	1,377	29.61%	4,651
Floyd	1,928	67.15%	623	21.70%	317	11.04%	3	0.10%	1,305	45.45%	2,871
Franklin	1,501	75.58%	410	20.64%	75	3.78%	0	0.00%	1,091	54.93%	1,986
Fremont	1,920	48.25%	1,650	41.47%	409	10.28%	0	0.00%	270	6.79%	3,979
Greene	1,645	65.75%	457	18.27%	399	15.95%	1	0.04%	1,188	47.48%	2,502
Grundy	1,498	71.54%	581	27.75%	12	0.57%	3	0.14%	917	43.79%	2,094
Guthrie	1,707	57.73%	635	21.47%	615	20.80%	0	0.00%	1,072	36.25%	2,957
Hamilton	1,305	67.69%	332	17.22%	283	14.68%	8	0.41%	973	50.47%	1,928
Hancock	517	75.04%	168	24.38%	4	0.58%	0	0.00%	349	50.65%	689
Hardin	2,223	70.55%	812	25.77%	115	3.65%	1	0.03%	1,411	44.78%	3,151
Harrison	1,902	52.76%	1,321	36.64%	382	10.60%	0	0.00%	581	16.12%	3,605
Henry	2,458	58.78%	1,142	27.31%	572	13.68%	10	0.24%	1,316	31.47%	4,182
Howard	1,066	54.00%	235	11.90%	673	34.09%	0	0.00%	393	19.91%	1,974
Humboldt	669	70.42%	250	26.32%	26	2.74%	5	0.53%	419	44.11%	950
Ida	694	66.73%	339	32.60%	4	0.38%	3	0.29%	355	34.13%	1,040
Iowa	1,787	52.44%	1,286	37.73%	335	9.83%	0	0.00%	501	14.70%	3,408
Jackson	2,148	43.73%	2,522	51.34%	241	4.91%	1	0.02%	-374	-7.61%	4,912
Jasper	3,162	55.35%	1,407	24.63%	1,144	20.02%	0	0.00%	1,755	30.72%	5,713
Jefferson	2,130	57.82%	1,380	37.46%	160	4.34%	14	0.38%	750	20.36%	3,684
Johnson	2,400	44.89%	2,766	51.74%	126	2.36%	54	1.01%	-366	-6.85%	5,346
Jones	2,617	61.32%	1,627	38.12%	15	0.35%	9	0.21%	990	23.20%	4,268
Keokuk	2,367	52.25%	1,803	39.80%	360	7.95%	0	0.00%	564	12.45%	4,530
Kossuth	781	69.98%	249	22.31%	86	7.71%	0	0.00%	532	47.67%	1,116
Lee	3,098	43.86%	3,464	49.04%	494	6.99%	8	0.11%	-366	-5.18%	7,064
Linn	4,508	58.52%	2,875	37.32%	301	3.91%	19	0.25%	1,633	21.20%	7,703
Louisa	1,745	65.04%	720	26.84%	200	7.45%	18	0.67%	1,025	38.20%	2,683
Lucas	1,599	54.46%	1,020	34.74%	315	10.73%	2	0.07%	579	19.72%	2,936
Lyon	374	78.74%	101	21.26%	0	0.00%	0	0.00%	273	57.47%	475
Madison	1,823	48.61%	837	22.32%	1,090	29.07%	0	0.00%	733	19.55%	3,750
Mahaska	3,081	56.11%	1,210	22.04%	1,185	21.58%	15	0.27%	1,871	34.07%	5,491
Marion	2,452	47.46%	1,520	29.42%	1,190	23.04%	4	0.08%	932	18.04%	5,166
Marshall	3,084	66.54%	1,234	26.62%	267	5.76%	50	1.08%	1,850	39.91%	4,635
Mills	1,689	55.87%	1,060	35.06%	270	8.93%	4	0.13%	629	20.81%	3,023
Mitchell	1,665	63.65%	832	31.80%	83	3.17%	36	1.38%	833	31.84%	2,616
Monona	942	57.69%	331	20.27%	360	22.05%	0	0.00%	582	35.64%	1,633
Monroe	1,289	50.59%	775	30.42%	483	18.96%	1	0.04%	514	20.17%	2,548
Montgomery	1,981	63.90%	692	22.32%	427	13.77%	0	0.00%	1,289	41.58%	3,100
Muscatine	2,664	54.39%	1,966	40.14%	268	5.47%	0	0.00%	698	14.25%	4,898
O'Brien	599	66.56%	199	22.11%	101	11.22%	1	0.11%	400	44.44%	900
Osceola	432	82.44%	91	17.37%	0	0.00%	1	0.19%	341	65.08%	524
Page	2,709	67.07%	972	24.07%	339	8.39%	19	0.47%	1,737	43.01%	4,039
Palo Alto	398	45.80%	375	43.15%	96	11.05%	0	0.00%	23	2.65%	869
Plymouth	884	52.00%	756	44.47%	60	3.53%	0	0.00%	128	7.53%	1,700
Pocahontas	463	66.71%	214	30.84%	17	2.45%	0	0.00%	249	35.88%	694
Polk	4,781	58.50%	2,161	26.44%	1,204	14.73%	26	0.32%	2,620	32.06%	8,172
Pottawattamie	3,687	55.33%	2,793	41.91%	184	2.76%	0	0.00%	894	13.42%	6,664
Poweshiek	2,440	61.57%	936	23.62%	583	14.71%	4	0.10%	1,504	37.95%	3,963
Ringgold	1,450	59.97%	436	18.03%	525	21.71%	7	0.29%	925	38.25%	2,418
Sac	1,346	71.37%	445	23.59%	92	4.88%	3	0.16%	901	47.77%	1,886
Scott	4,322	61.04%	2,594	36.63%	150	2.12%	15	0.21%	1,728	24.40%	7,081
Shelby	1,499	58.40%	963	37.51%	105	4.09%	0	0.00%	536	20.88%	2,567
Sioux	677	65.16%	351	33.78%	11	1.06%	0	0.00%	326	31.38%	1,039
Story	2,041	66.63%	544	17.76%	464	15.15%	14	0.46%	1,497	48.87%	3,063
Tama	2,712	67.75%	1,096	27.38%	193	4.82%	2	0.05%	1,616	40.37%	4,003
Taylor	1,984	59.63%	784	23.56%	559	16.80%	0	0.00%	1,200	36.07%	3,327
Union	1,555	49.73%	771	24.66%	801	25.62%	0	0.00%	754	24.11%	3,127
Van Buren	1,876	49.01%	1,529	39.94%	299	7.81%	124	3.24%	347	9.06%	3,828
Wapello	2,846	51.91%	2,345	42.77%	292	5.33%	0	0.00%	501	9.14%	5,483
Warren	2,205	52.80%	1,019	24.40%	952	22.80%	0	0.00%	1,186	28.40%	4,176
Washington	2,516	59.24%	1,370	32.26%	347	8.17%	14	0.33%	1,146	26.98%	4,247
Wayne	1,737	50.74%	774	22.61%	890	26.00%	22	0.64%	847	24.74%	3,423
Webster	1,575	53.17%	798	26.94%	589	19.89%	0	0.00%	777	26.23%	2,962
Winnebago	703	83.89%	67	8.00%	33	3.94%	35	4.18%	636	75.89%	838
Winneshiek	2,474	57.70%	1,415	33.00%	212	4.94%	187	4.36%	1,059	24.70%	4,288
Woodbury	1,453	56.25%	995	38.52%	135	5.23%	0	0.00%	458	17.73%	2,583
Worth	933	75.42%	290	23.44%	11	0.89%	3	0.24%	643	51.98%	1,237
Wright	758	78.06%	182	18.74%	31	3.19%	0	0.00%	576	59.32%	971
Totals	183,945	56.86%	105,800	32.70%	32,707	10.11%	1,064	0.33%	78,145	24.15%	323,516

== See also ==
- United States presidential elections in Iowa
