= United States presidential elections in Texas =

Presidential elections in Texas

Presidential elections in Texas
- Number of elections: 43
- Voted Democratic: 27
- Voted Republican: 16
- Voted for winning candidate: 26
- Voted for losing candidate: 17

Following is a table of United States presidential elections in Texas, ordered by year. Since its admission to statehood in 1845, Texas has participated in every U.S. presidential election except the 1864 election during the American Civil War, when the state had seceded to join the Confederacy, and the 1868 election, when the state was undergoing Reconstruction.

In its first century, Texas was a Democratic bastion in the mold of the "Solid South", only voting for another party once–– in 1928, when anti-Catholic sentiment against Democratic nominee Al Smith drove Texas' largely-Protestant electorate to back Republican Herbert Hoover. A gradual trend towards increasing social liberalism in the Democratic Party, however, has turned the state into generally a Republican stronghold. Since 1980, Texas has voted for the Republican nominee in every presidential election. However, recent data has shown for it to possibly become a swing state for 2028 and might go Democrat for the first time since 1976.

Winners of the state are in bold. The shading refers to the state winner, and not the national winner.

== Elections from 1864 to present ==
View source data.

Year	Winner (nationally)	Votes	Percent	Runner-up (nationally)	Votes	Percent	Other national candidates (Note: For purposes of these lists, other national candidates are defined as those who won at least one electoral vote, or won at least ten percent of the vote in multiple states.)	Votes	Percent	Electoral votes	Margin of victory
2024	**Donald Trump**	6,393,597	56.14	Kamala Harris	4,835,250	42.46	—			40	1,558,347
2020	Joe Biden	5,259,126	46.48	**Donald Trump**	5,890,347	52.06	—			38	631,221
2016	**Donald Trump** (Note: Won the electoral college while losing the popular vote)	4,685,047	52.23	Hillary Clinton	3,877,868	43.24	—			38 (Note: Two faithless electors, one voting for John Kasich, another for Ron Paul.)	807,179
2012	Barack Obama	3,308,124	41.38	**Mitt Romney**	4,569,843	57.17	—			38	1,261,719
2008	Barack Obama	3,528,633	43.68	**John McCain**	4,479,328	55.45	—			34	950,695
2004	**George W. Bush**	4,526,917	61.09	John Kerry	2,832,704	38.22	—			34	1,694,213
2000	**George W. Bush**	3,799,639	59.30	Al Gore	2,433,746	37.98	—			32	1,365,893
1996	Bill Clinton	2,459,683	43.83	**Bob Dole**	2,736,167	48.76	Ross Perot	378,537	6.75	32	276,484
1992	Bill Clinton	2,281,815	37.08	**George H. W. Bush**	2,496,071	40.56	Ross Perot	1,354,781	22.01	32	214,256
1988	**George H. W. Bush**	3,036,829	55.95	Michael Dukakis	2,352,748	43.35	—			29	684,081
1984	**Ronald Reagan**	3,433,428	63.61	Walter Mondale	1,949,276	36.11	—			29	1,484,152
1980	**Ronald Reagan**	2,510,705	55.28	Jimmy Carter	1,881,147	41.42	John B. Anderson	111,613	2.46	26	629,558
1976	**Jimmy Carter**	2,082,319	51.14	Gerald Ford	1,953,300	47.97	—			26	129,019
1972	**Richard Nixon**	2,298,896	66.20	George McGovern	1,154,291	33.24	—			26	1,144,605
1968	Richard Nixon	1,227,844	39.87	**Hubert Humphrey**	1,266,804	41.14	George Wallace	584,269	18.97	25	38,960
1964	**Lyndon B. Johnson**	1,663,185	63.32	Barry Goldwater	958,566	36.49	—			25	704,619
1960	**John F. Kennedy**	1,167,567	50.52	Richard Nixon	1,121,310	48.52	—			24	46,257
1956	**Dwight D. Eisenhower**	1,080,619	55.26	Adlai Stevenson II	859,958	43.98	T. Coleman Andrews/ Unpledged Electors (Note: Was allied with a slate of unpledged electors in Louisiana, Mississippi and South Carolina)	14,591	0.75	24	220,661
1952	**Dwight D. Eisenhower**	1,102,878	53.13	Adlai Stevenson II	969,228	46.69	—			24	133,650
1948	**Harry S. Truman**	824,235	65.96	Thomas E. Dewey	303,467	24.29	Strom Thurmond	113,776	9.11	23	520,768
1944	**Franklin D. Roosevelt**	821,605	71.42	Thomas E. Dewey	191,425	16.64	—			23	630,180
1940	**Franklin D. Roosevelt**	909,974	80.92	Wendell Willkie	212,692	18.91	—			23	697,282
1936	**Franklin D. Roosevelt**	734,485	87.08	Alf Landon	103,874	12.31	—			23	630,611
1932	**Franklin D. Roosevelt**	760,348	88.06	Herbert Hoover	97,959	11.35	—			23	662,389
1928	**Herbert Hoover**	367,036	51.77	Al Smith	341,032	48.10	—			20	26,004
1924	Calvin Coolidge	130,023	19.78	**John W. Davis**	484,605	73.70	Robert M. La Follette	42,881	6.52	20	354,582
1920	Warren G. Harding	114,538	23.54	**James M. Cox**	288,767	59.34	Parley P. Christensen	—	—	20	174,229
1916	**Woodrow Wilson**	286,514	76.92	Charles E. Hughes	64,999	17.45	—			20	221,515
1912	**Woodrow Wilson**	221,589	72.62	Theodore Roosevelt	28,853	9.46	William H. Taft	26,755	8.77	20	192,736
1908	William H. Taft	65,666	22.35	**William Jennings Bryan**	217,302	73.97	—			18	151,636
1904	Theodore Roosevelt	51,242	21.9	**Alton B. Parker**	167,200	71.45	—			18	115,958
1900	William McKinley	130,641	30.83	**William Jennings Bryan**	267,432	63.12	—			15	136,791
1896	William McKinley	167,520	30.75	**William Jennings Bryan**	370,434	68.00	—			15	202,914
1892	**Grover Cleveland**	239,148	56.65	Benjamin Harrison	81,144	19.22	James B. Weaver	99,688	23.61	15	158,004
1888	Benjamin Harrison	88,422	24.73	**Grover Cleveland**	234,883	65.7	—			13	146,461
1884	**Grover Cleveland**	225,309	69.26	James G. Blaine	93,141	28.63	—			13	132,168
1880	James A. Garfield	57,893	23.95	**Winfield S. Hancock**	156,428	64.71	James B. Weaver	27,405	11.34	8	98,535
1876	Rutherford B. Hayes	44,800	29.96	**Samuel J. Tilden**	104,755	70.04	—			8	59,955
1872	Ulysses S. Grant	47,468	40.71	**Horace Greeley**	66,546	57.07	—			8	19,078
1868	Ulysses S. Grant	No vote due to status of Reconstruction.		Horatio Seymour			—				
1864	Abraham Lincoln	No vote due to secession.		George B. McClellan			—				
Bolded: Won Texas.											

== Election of 1860 ==
The election of 1860 was a complex realigning election in which the breakdown of the previous two-party alignment culminated in four parties each competing for influence in different parts of the country. The result of the election, with the victory of an ardent opponent of slavery, spurred the secession of eleven states and brought about the American Civil War.

Year	Winner (nationally)	Votes	Percent	Runner-up (nationally)	Votes	Percent	Runner-up (nationally)	Votes	Percent	Runner-up (nationally)	Votes	Percent	Electoral votes
1860	Abraham Lincoln	no ballots		Stephen A. Douglas	18	0.0	**John C. Breckinridge**	47,454	75.5	John Bell	15,383	24.5	4
Bolded: Won Texas.

== Elections prior to 1860 ==
Year	Winner (nationally)	Votes	Percent	Runner-up (nationally)	Votes	Percent	Other national candidates	Votes	Percent	Electoral votes
1856	**James Buchanan**	31,169	66.59	John C. Frémont	no ballots		Millard Fillmore	15,639	33.41	4
1852	**Franklin Pierce**	13,552	73.07	Winfield Scott	4,995	26.93	John P. Hale	no ballots		4
1848	Zachary Taylor	4,509	29.71	**Lewis Cass**	10,668	70.29	Martin Van Buren	no ballots		4
Bolded: Won Texas.

== Results Maps ==
1976 United States presidential election

1980 United States presidential election

1984 United States presidential election

1988 United States presidential election

1992 United States presidential election

1996 United States presidential election

2000 United States presidential election

2004 United States presidential election

2008 United States presidential election

2012 United States presidential election

2016 United States presidential election

2020 United States presidential election

2024 United States presidential election

== See also ==
- Elections in Texas
