= 1912 United States presidential election in Texas =

- November 5, 1912

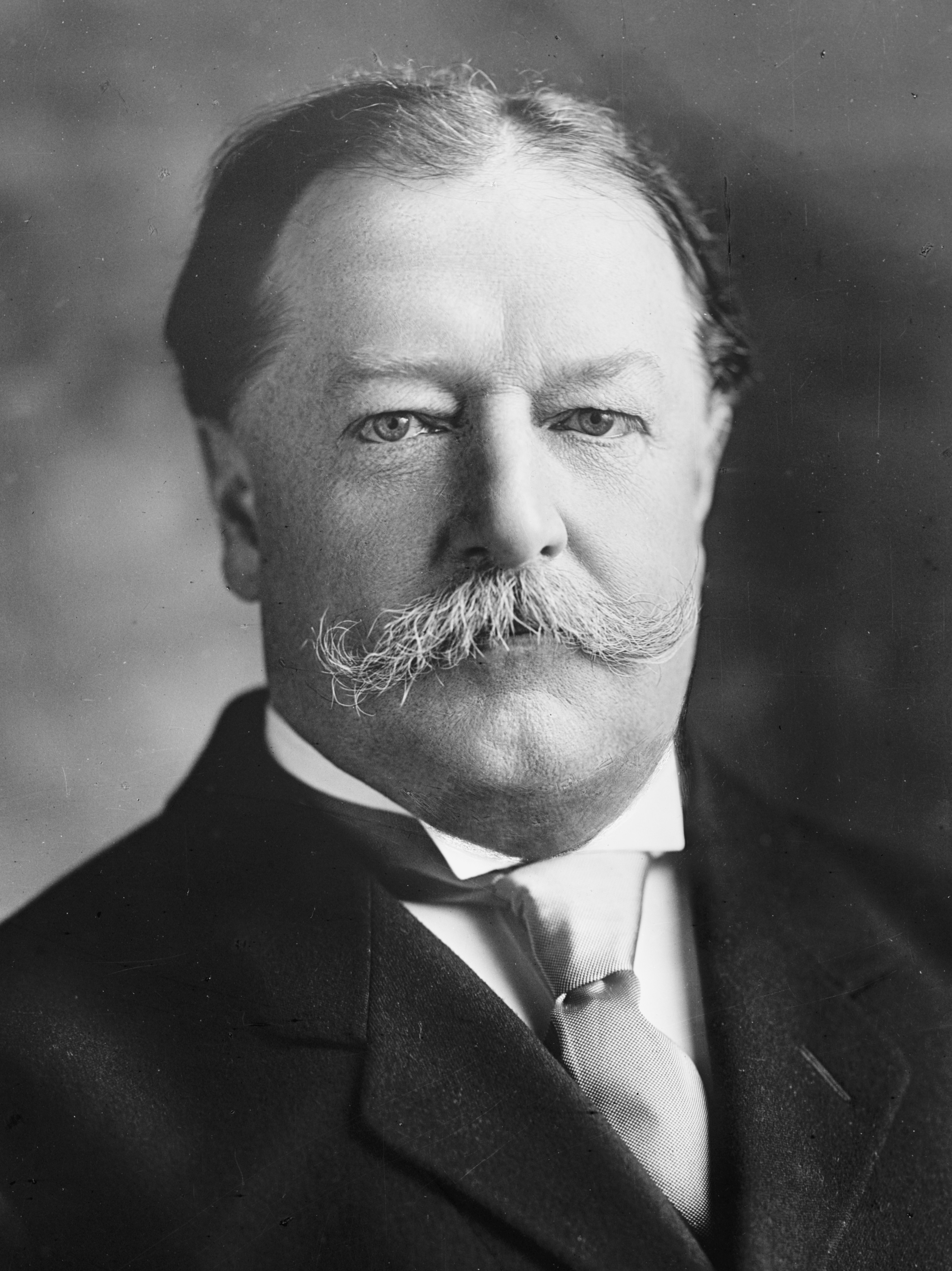

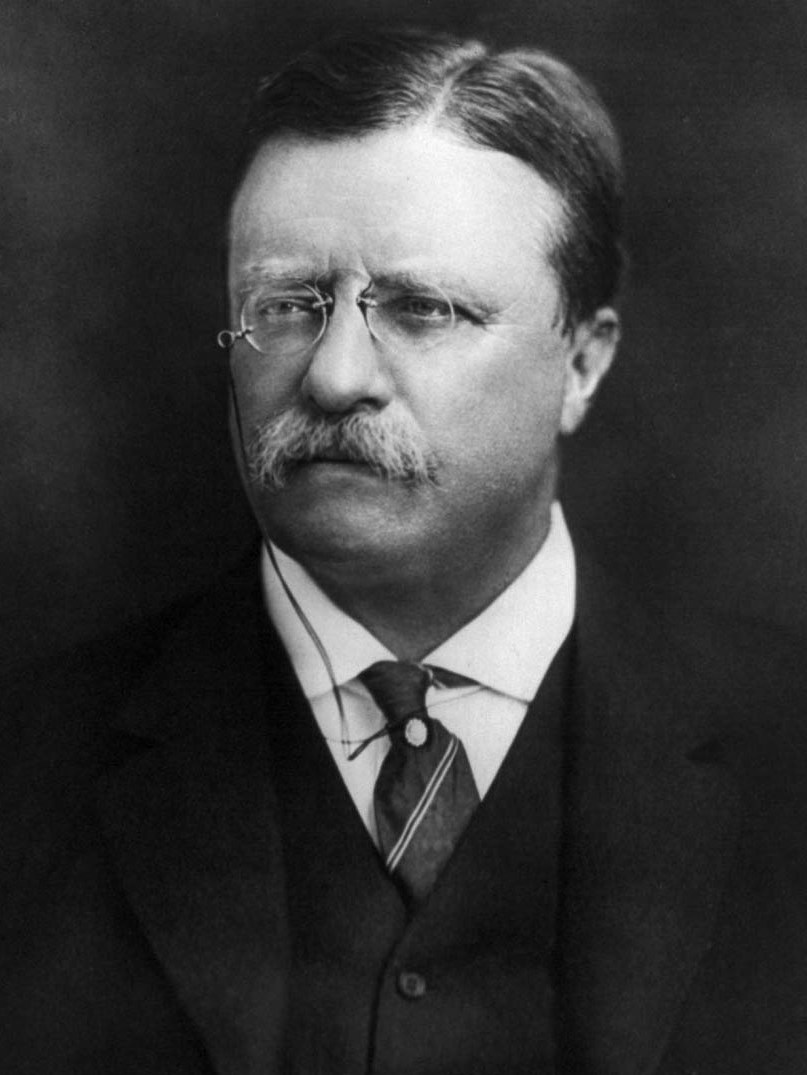

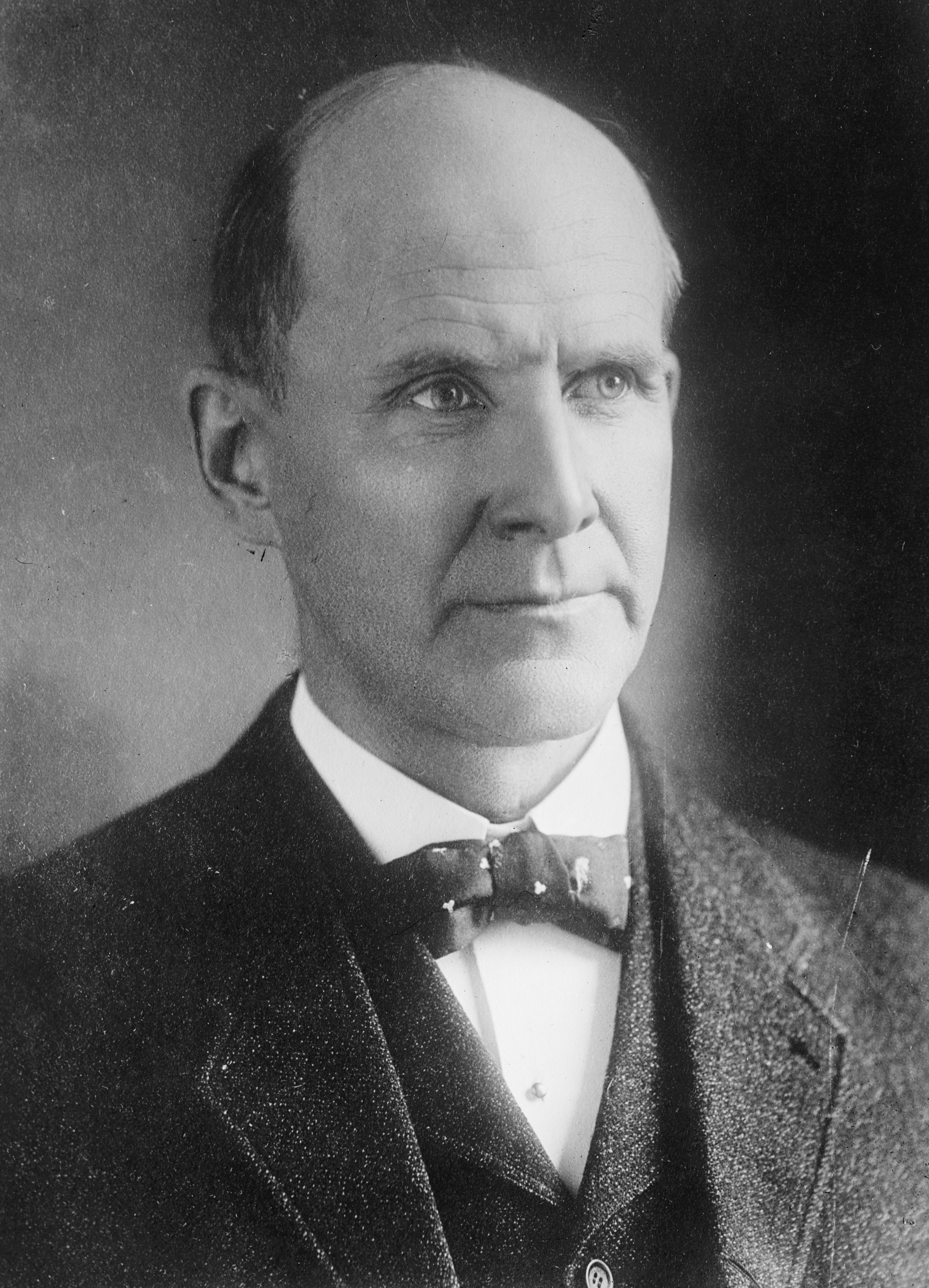
Nominee	Woodrow Wilson	William Howard Taft
Party	Democratic	Republican
Home state	New Jersey	Ohio
Running mate	Thomas R. Marshall	Nicholas Murray Butler
Electoral vote	20	0
Popular vote	219,489	28,530
Percentage	72.73%	9.45%
Nominee	Theodore Roosevelt	Eugene V. Debs
Party	Progressive	Socialist
Home state	New York	Indiana
Running mate	Hiram Johnson	Emil Seidel
Electoral vote	0	0
Popular vote	26,745	24,896
Percentage	8.86%	8.25%
County results
Wilson
40–50%
50–60%
60–70%
70–80%
80–90%
90–100%
Taft
30–40%
50–60%
80–90%
Roosevelt
30–40%
60–70%
President before election
William Howard Taft
Republican
Elected President
Woodrow Wilson
Democratic

The 1912 United States presidential election in Texas took place on November 5, 1912, as part of the 1912 United States presidential election. Texas voters chose 20 representatives, or electors, to the Electoral College, who voted for president and vice president.

Texas was won by Princeton University President Woodrow Wilson (D–Virginia), running with governor of Indiana Thomas R. Marshall, with 72.73% of the popular vote, against the 27th president of the United States William Howard Taft (R–Ohio), running with Columbia University President Nicholas Murray Butler, with 9.45% of the popular vote, the 26th president of the United States Theodore Roosevelt (P–New York), running with governor of California Hiram Johnson, with 8.86% of the popular vote and the five-time candidate of the Socialist Party of America for President of the United States Eugene V. Debs (S–Indiana), running with the first Socialist mayor of a major city in the United States Emil Seidel, with 8.25% of the popular vote.

Taft was the last Republican to win Webb County until Donald Trump in 2024.

== Results ==
1912 United States presidential election in Texas
Party	Candidate	Votes	%
Democratic	Woodrow Wilson	219,489	72.73%
Republican	William Howard Taft (incumbent)	28,530	9.45%
Progressive	Theodore Roosevelt	26,745	8.86%
Socialist	Eugene V. Debs	24,896	8.25%
Prohibition	Eugene Chafin	1,698	0.56%
Socialist Labor	Arthur Reimer	430	0.14%
Total votes		301,788	100%

== See also ==
- United States presidential elections in Texas
