= 1856 United States presidential election in Texas =

- November 4, 1856
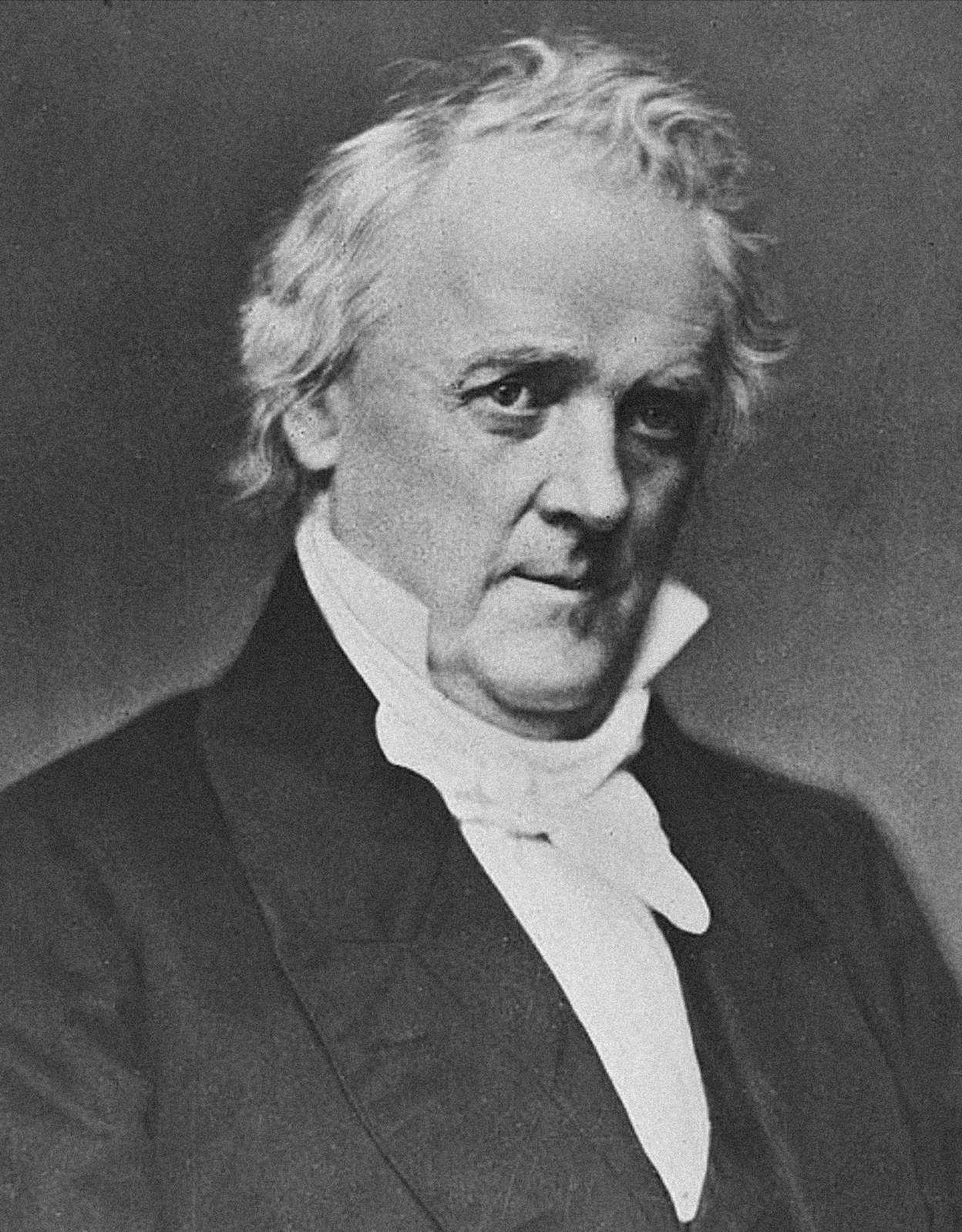

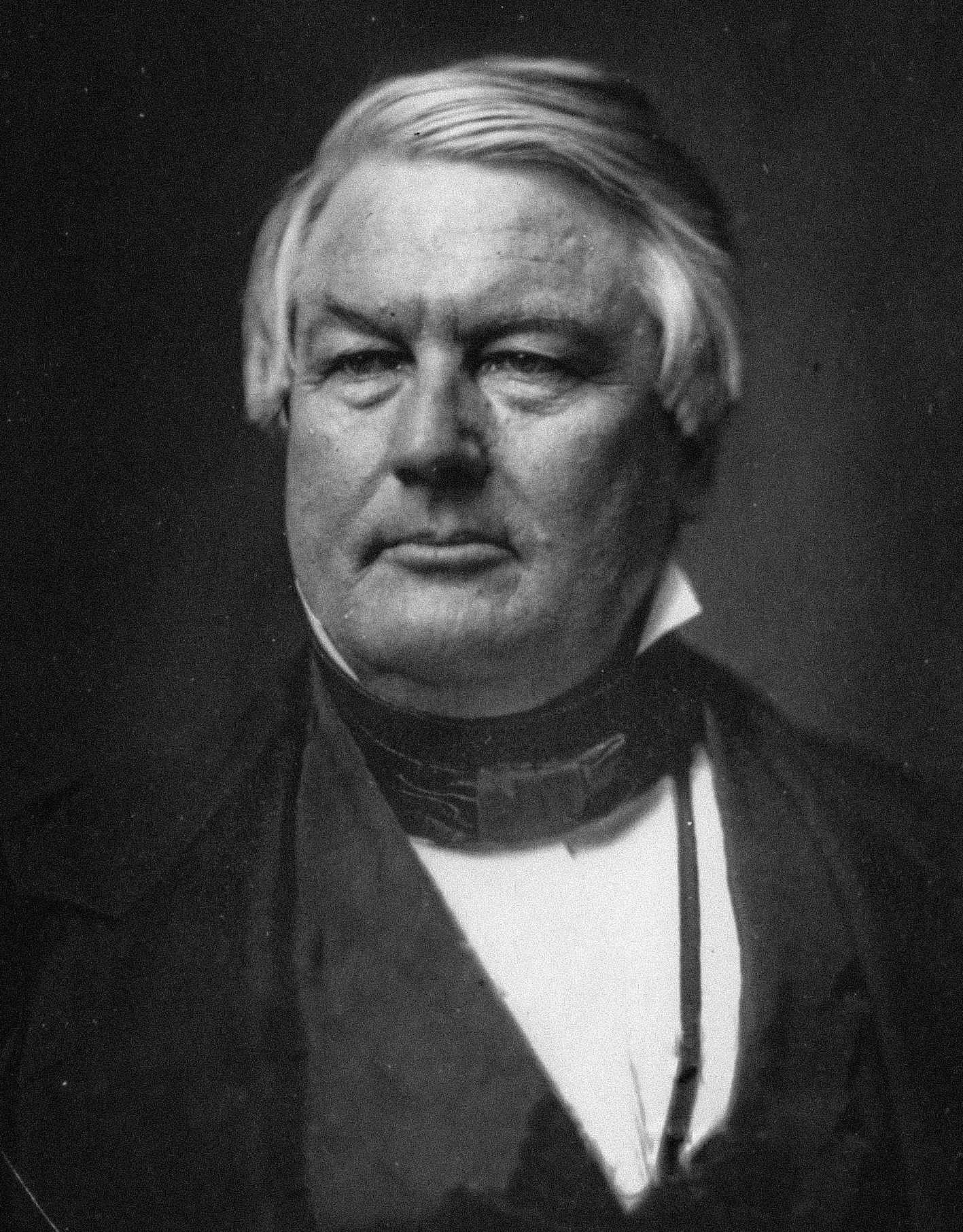
Nominee	James Buchanan	Millard Fillmore
Party	Democratic	Know Nothing
Home state	Pennsylvania	New York
Running mate	John C. Breckinridge	Andrew Jackson Donelson
Electoral vote	4	0
Popular vote	31,169	15,639
Percentage	66.59%	33.41%
County results
Buchanan
50–60%
60–70%
70–80%
80–90%
90–100%
Fillmore
50–60%
President before election
Franklin Pierce
Democratic
Elected President
James Buchanan
Democratic

The 1856 United States presidential election in Texas was held on Tuesday November 4, as part of the 1856 United States presidential election. State voters chose four electors to represent the state in the Electoral College, which chose the president and vice president.

Texas voted for the Democratic nominee James Buchanan, who received 67% of the vote. Texas was Buchanan's second-strongest state.

Republican Party nominee John C. Frémont was not on the ballot. Texas would never be won by a Republican candidate until Herbert Hoover narrowly won the state in 1928.

== Results ==
1856 United States presidential election in Texas
Party	Candidate	Votes	Percentage	Electoral votes
Democratic	James Buchanan	31,169	66.589%	4
Know-Nothing	Millard Fillmore	15,639	33.411%	0
Total		46,808	100.0%	4

== See also ==
- United States presidential elections in Texas
