= 1860 United States presidential election in Texas =

- November 6, 1860
- Turnout: 61.7% ▼0.8 pp
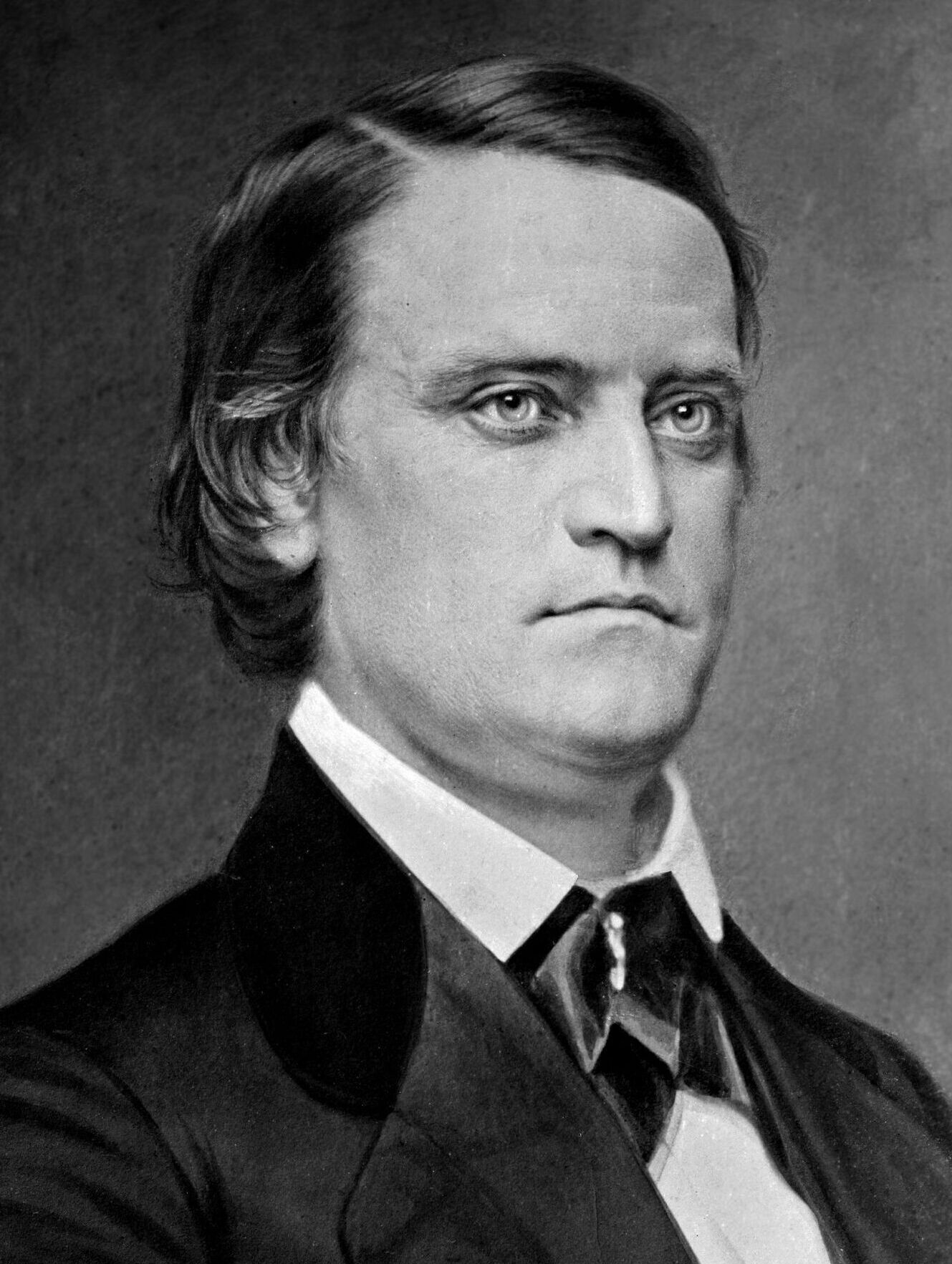

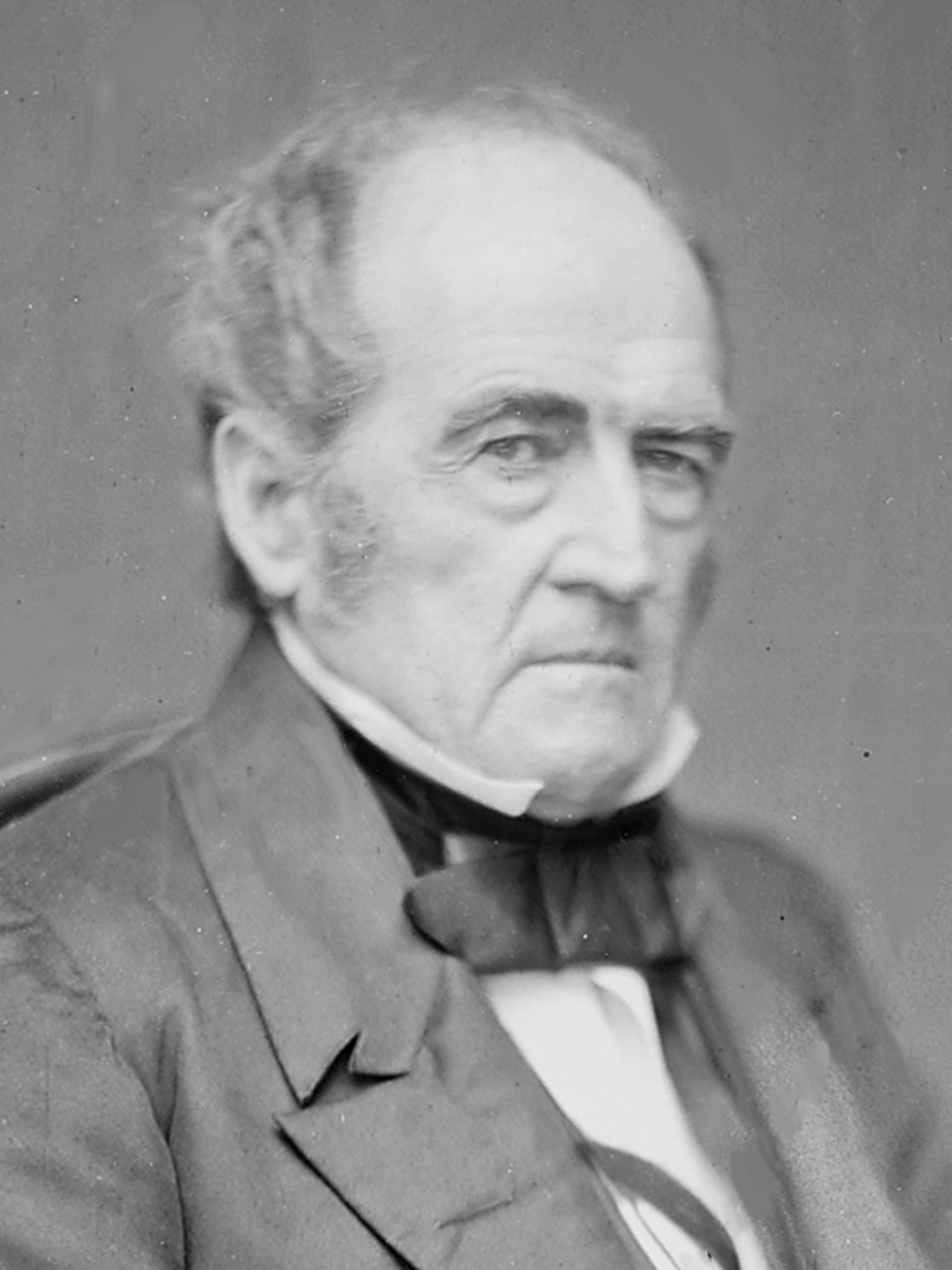
Nominee	John C. Breckinridge	John Bell
Party	Southern Democratic	Constitutional Union
Home state	Kentucky	Tennessee
Running mate	Joseph Lane	Edward Everett
Electoral vote	4	0
Popular vote	47,548	15,438
Percentage	75.47%	24.50%
County results
Breckinridge
50–60%
60–70%
70–80%
80–90%
90–100%
Bell
50–60%
70–80%
80–90%
Unknown/No Vote
President before election
James Buchanan
Democratic
Elected President
Abraham Lincoln
Republican

The 1860 United States presidential election in Texas was held on November 6, 1860. State voters chose four electors to represent the state in the Electoral College, which chose the president and vice president. Soon after this election, Texas seceded from the United States in March 1861 and joined the Confederate States of America. It would not participate in the following elections in 1864 and 1868. The state would not be readmitted into the Union until 1870 and would not participate in another presidential election until 1872. This would stand as the best performance of any Presidential candidate in Texas history for over 65 years, until Woodrow Wilson (76.92%) surpassed it in 1916. Other than Wilson, only Franklin D. Roosevelt exceeded Breckenridge's percent of the vote, though he did so in three of his four runs: in 1932 (88.06%), 1936 (87.08%), and 1940 (80.92%). This leaves Breckinridge's performance as the overall 5th best performance in Texas presidential history.

== Background ==
Before candidates were even nominated, Texas, as the frontier of slavery in the United States, was always recognized as extremely important to the extension of slavery, and nefarious tales of abolition plots there were common in the Southern media. Texas delegates to the first Democratic National Convention refused to accept “Northern Democrat” Stephen A. Douglas′ platform of “popular sovereignty” — locally called “squatter sovereignty” — because they believed that it would prevent the expansion of slavery in the same manner as the Republicans’ “free soil” policy. Texas was among the most insistent states upon a platform that guaranteed expansion of slavery into the territories and consequently the state Democratic party unanimously supported the nomination of Southern Democrat nominee John C. Breckinridge. Douglas, indeed, had so little support amongst the Texas electorate that his supporters had agreed to transfer their allegiance to Constitutional Union candidate John Bell, although their ultimate goal was to support whomever stood the best chance of beating Republican candidate Abraham Lincoln, who did not have significant ballot distribution in Texas.

== Analysis ==
With the state media overwhelmingly behind him, Texas overwhelmingly voted for Breckinridge by a margin of 50.97 points. Breckinridge won 75.47 percent of the vote, making Texas his strongest state. Despite the allegiance of Douglas supporters, Bell carried only three counties in the state and it is sometimes thought that the German-American abolitionists in such counties as Gillespie refrained from visiting the polls. Besides the counties he won, Bell only exceeded forty percent of the vote in six other counties. Douglas gained a mere 18 votes as a write-in candidate.

== Results ==
1860 United States presidential election in Texas
Party	Candidate	Votes	Percentage	Electoral votes
Southern Democratic	John C. Breckinridge	47,548	75.47%	4
Constitutional Union	John Bell	15,438	24.50%	0
Democratic	Stephen A. Douglas (write-in)	18 (Note: The write-in votes for Stephen A. Douglas are only given as a state total, as they are not included in most county data.)	0.03%	0
Total		63,004	100.00%	4

=== Results by county ===
1860 United States presidential election in Texas by county (Note: No returns have been located for this election for Clay County.)
County	John C. Breckinridge Southern Democratic		John Bell Constitutional Union		Total votes cast
County	#	%	#	%	Total votes cast
Anderson	853	88.30%	113	11.70%	966
Angelina	213	63.58%	122	36.42%	335
Atascosa	194	90.23%	21	9.77%	215
Austin	395	74.53%	135	25.47%	530
Bandera	6	15.79%	32	84.21%	38
Bastrop	433	70.18%	184	29.82%	617
Bee	121	83.45%	24	16.55%	145
Bell	486	71.68%	192	28.32%	678
Bexar	986	77.09%	293	22.91%	1,279
Blanco	136	82.93%	28	17.07%	164
Bosque	218	82.58%	46	17.42%	264
Bowie	324	72.00%	126	28.00%	450
Brazoria	390	85.71%	65	14.29%	455
Brazos	253	95.11%	13	4.89%	266
Brown	39	81.25%	9	18.75%	48
Burleson	506	82.14%	110	17.86%	616
Burnet	148	52.11%	136	47.89%	284
Caldwell	423	76.77%	128	23.23%	551
Calhoun	350	74.15%	122	25.85%	472
Cameron	335	80.34%	82	19.66%	417
Cass	536	69.61%	234	30.39%	770
Chambers	106	84.80%	19	15.20%	125
Cherokee	905	85.14%	158	14.86%	1,063
Collin	667	62.39%	402	37.61%	1,069
Colorado	569	59.15%	393	40.85%	962
Comal	201	90.95%	20	9.05%	221
Comanche (Note: Not included in the official returns as they arrived after the deadline.)	104	92.04%	9	7.96%	113
Cooke	264	66.00%	136	34.00%	400
Coryell	249	77.57%	72	22.43%	321
Dallas	868	75.81%	277	24.19%	1,145
Denton	586	75.61%	189	24.39%	775
DeWitt	490	85.51%	83	14.49%	573
Ellis	416	66.88%	206	33.12%	622
El Paso	1,042	98.96%	11	1.04%	1,053
Erath	214	91.85%	19	8.15%	233
Falls	161	65.45%	85	34.55%	246
Fannin	778	67.36%	377	32.64%	1,155
Fayette	744	62.78%	441	37.22%	1,185
Fort Bend	362	92.11%	31	7.89%	393
Freestone	569	89.18%	69	10.82%	638
Galveston	730	72.06%	283	27.94%	1,013
Gillespie	66	48.53%	70	51.47%	136
Goliad	243	64.12%	136	35.88%	379
Gonzales	646	75.12%	214	24.88%	860
Grayson	776	63.76%	441	36.24%	1,217
Grimes	604	74.85%	203	25.15%	807
Guadalupe	244	63.54%	140	36.46%	384
Hamilton	108	93.10%	8	6.90%	116
Hardin	231	93.52%	16	6.48%	247
Harris	990	72.16%	382	27.84%	1,372
Harrison	681	63.70%	388	36.30%	1,069
Hays	164	55.41%	132	44.59%	296
Henderson	464	79.45%	120	20.55%	584
Hidalgo	64	100.00%	0	0.00%	64
Hill	389	74.95%	130	25.05%	519
Hopkins	812	74.98%	271	25.02%	1,083
Houston	431	77.10%	128	22.90%	559
Hunt	712	75.18%	235	24.82%	947
Jack	100	74.07%	35	25.93%	135
Jackson	181	61.15%	115	38.85%	296
Jasper	268	75.28%	88	24.72%	356
Jefferson	257	75.15%	85	24.85%	342
Johnson	446	88.32%	59	11.68%	505
Karnes	160	71.75%	63	28.25%	223
Kaufman	663	79.69%	169	20.31%	832
Kerr	86	73.50%	31	26.50%	117
Lamar	791	70.44%	332	29.56%	1,123
Lampasas	80	52.63%	72	47.37%	152
Lavaca	596	84.42%	110	15.58%	706
Leon	576	80.67%	138	19.33%	714
Liberty	345	98.29%	6	1.71%	351
Limestone	482	92.34%	40	7.66%	522
Live Oak	133	92.36%	11	7.64%	144
Llano	153	76.12%	48	23.88%	201
Madison	232	89.92%	26	10.08%	258
Marion	446	70.79%	184	29.21%	630
Mason	17	94.44%	1	5.56%	18
Matagorda	195	96.06%	8	3.94%	203
McLennan	524	72.18%	202	27.82%	726
Medina	146	80.22%	36	19.78%	182
Milam	474	73.15%	174	26.85%	648
Montague	120	78.95%	32	21.05%	152
Montgomery	263	69.95%	113	30.05%	376
Nacogdoches	381	66.61%	191	33.39%	572
Navarro	491	74.17%	171	25.83%	662
Newton	100	89.29%	12	10.71%	112
Nueces	128	74.42%	44	25.58%	172
Orange	129	95.56%	6	4.44%	135
Palo Pinto	152	96.20%	6	3.80%	158
Panola	518	79.94%	130	20.06%	648
Parker	775	82.36%	166	17.64%	941
Polk	562	90.06%	62	9.94%	624
Red River	514	62.30%	311	37.70%	825
Refugio	155	81.15%	36	18.85%	191
Robertson	341	78.03%	96	21.97%	437
Rusk	1,149	68.93%	518	31.07%	1,667
Sabine	232	95.47%	11	4.53%	243
San Augustine	219	86.56%	34	13.44%	253
San Patricio	64	95.52%	3	4.48%	67
San Saba	115	74.68%	39	25.32%	154
Shelby	425	84.49%	78	15.51%	503
Smith	1,155	76.85%	348	23.15%	1,503
Starr	40	27.40%	106	72.60%	146
Tarrant	618	74.82%	208	25.18%	826
Titus	884	76.08%	278	23.92%	1,162
Travis	556	56.91%	421	43.09%	977
Trinity	218	88.98%	27	11.02%	245
Tyler	496	98.41%	8	1.59%	504
Upshur	945	73.89%	334	26.11%	1,279
Uvalde	81	80.20%	20	19.80%	101
Van Zandt	335	92.03%	29	7.97%	364
Victoria	235	71.65%	93	28.35%	328
Walker	499	75.61%	161	24.39%	660
Washington	908	84.23%	170	15.77%	1,078
Webb	76	98.70%	1	1.30%	77
Wharton	215	91.10%	21	8.90%	236
Williamson	487	68.40%	225	31.60%	712
Wilson	47	54.02%	40	45.98%	87
Wise	169	65.50%	89	34.50%	258
Wood	515	67.14%	252	32.86%	767
Young	98	89.91%	11	10.09%	109
Zapata	151	100.00%	0	0.00%	151
Total	47,639	75.54%	15,422	24.46%	63,061

== See also ==
- United States presidential elections in Texas
