= 1876 United States presidential election in Texas =

- November 7, 1876
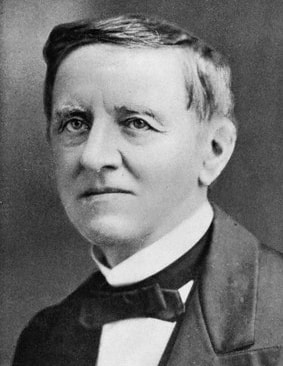

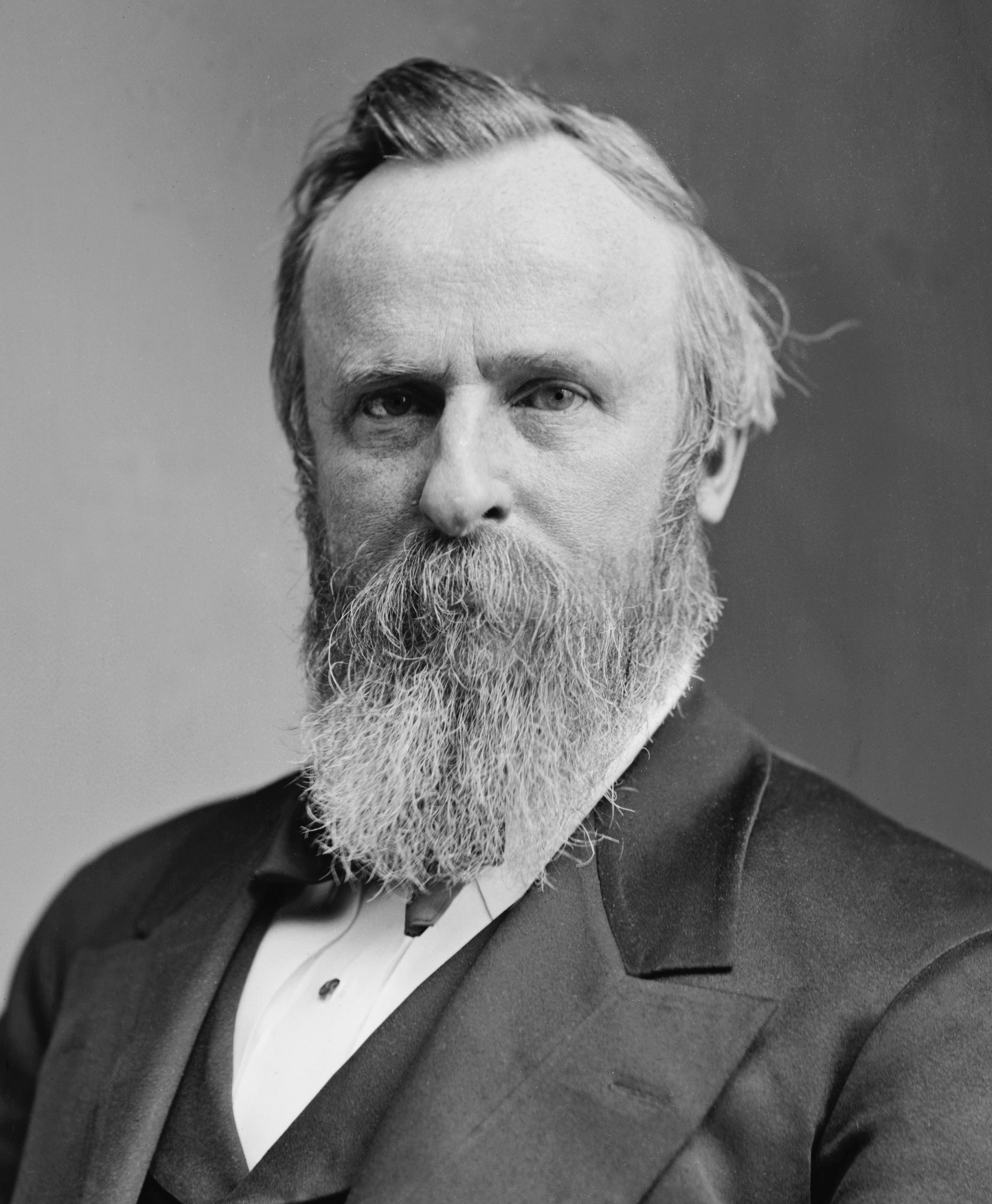
Nominee	Samuel J. Tilden	Rutherford B. Hayes
Party	Democratic	Republican
Home state	New York	Ohio
Running mate	Thomas A. Hendricks	William A. Wheeler
Electoral vote	8	0
Popular vote	104,755	44,800
Percentage	70.04%	29.96%
County results
Tilden
50–60%
60–70%
70–80%
80–90%
90–100%
Hayes
50–60%
60–70%
70–80%
80–90%
90–100%
President before election
Ulysses S. Grant
Republican
Elected President
Rutherford B. Hayes
Republican

The 1876 United States presidential election in Texas was held on November 7, 1876, as part of the 1876 United States presidential election. State voters chose eight electors to represent the state in the Electoral College, which chose the president and vice president.

Texas overwhelmingly voted for the Democratic nominee, Governor Samuel J. Tilden of New York, who received 70% of the vote. With 70% of the popular vote, Texas proved to be Tilden's second-strongest state only after Georgia.

== Results ==
1876 United States presidential election in Texas
Party	Candidate	Votes	Percentage	Electoral votes
Democratic	Samuel J. Tilden	104,755	70.04%	8
Republican	Rutherford B. Hayes	44,800	29.96%	0
Total		149,555	100.0%	8

== See also ==
- United States presidential elections in Texas
