= 1848 United States presidential election in Texas =

- November 7, 1848
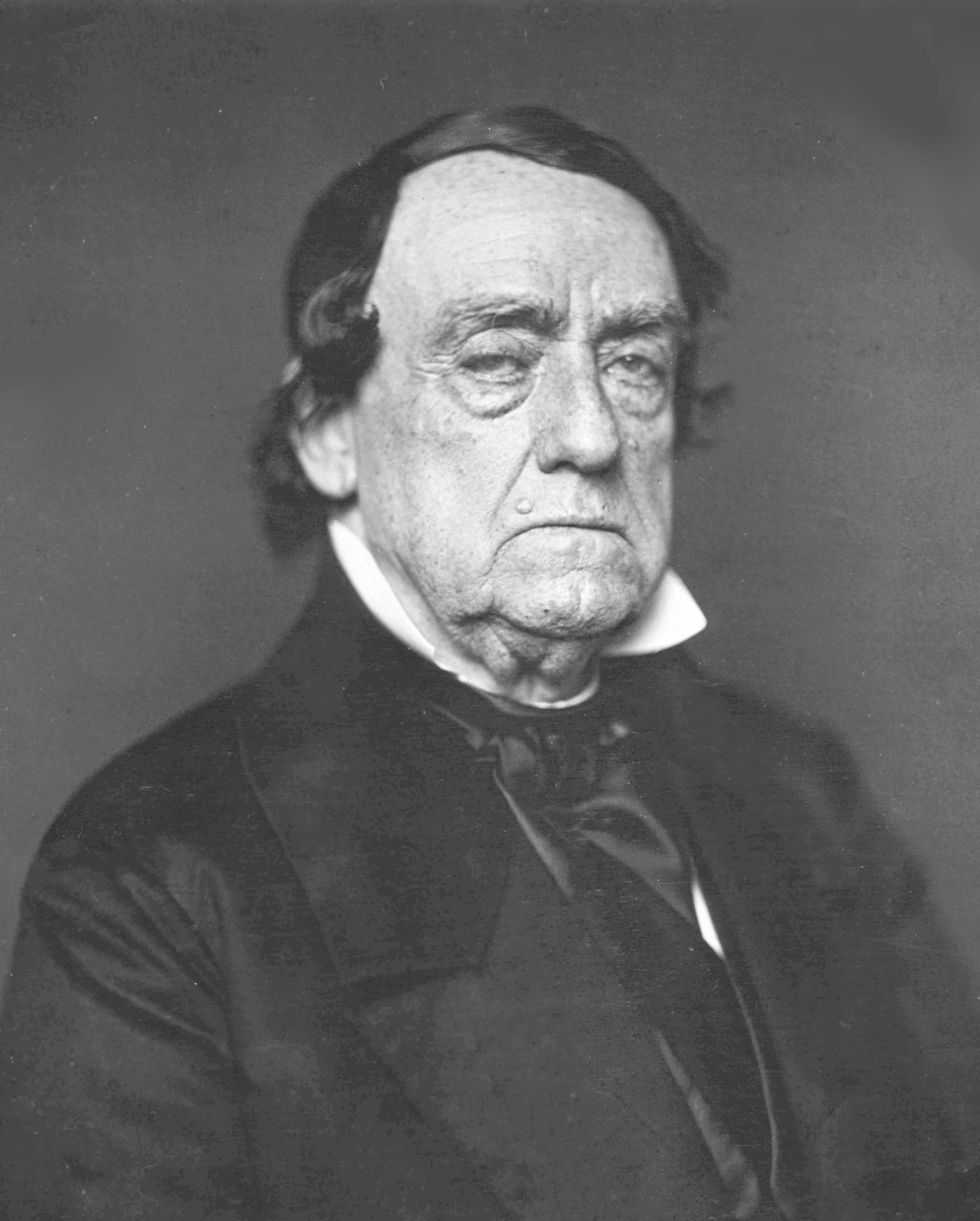

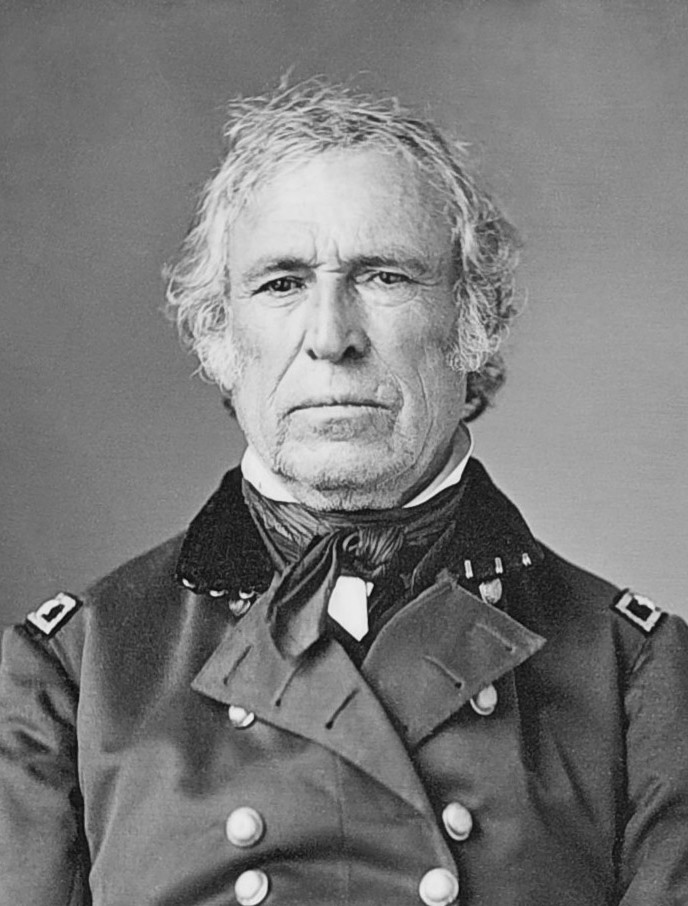
Nominee	Lewis Cass	Zachary Taylor
Party	Democratic	Whig
Home state	Michigan	Louisiana
Running mate	William O. Butler	Millard Fillmore
Electoral vote	4	0
Popular vote	10,668	4,509
Percentage	70.29%	29.71%
County results
Cass
50–60%
60–70%
70–80%
80–90%
90–100%
Taylor
50–60%
President before election
James K. Polk
Democratic
Elected President
Zachary Taylor
Whig

The 1848 United States presidential election in Texas was held on November 7, 1848, as part of the 1848 United States presidential election. State voters chose four electors to represent the state in the Electoral College, which chose the president and vice president.

Texas had become the 28th state on December 29, 1845, and would be officially annexed by the United States on February 19, 1846, making this the first presidential election in which the state participated. The area which was Texas was much larger than it is today, but from a purely geographical perspective it was only a minority of this vast territory, specifically the southern and eastern regions of the new state that was settled, organized into counties and thus actually participated in the election. This was the last U.S. presidential election prior to the Compromise of 1850, a part of which included Texas ceding the extremity of its northwestern claims to the federal government and establishing its modern borders. However, it would not be until the 1920s that the entirety of the land within even Texas' post-1850 borders was organized into counties, which was (and technically still is) a legal prerequisite for voting to take place in Texas.

The settled regions of the state were mostly used as rural farming land, making the Democratic pro-slavery voters more likely to vote for Lewis Cass and as a result, Texas overwhelmingly voted for the Democratic nominee Lewis Cass, who received 70.3% of the vote. Texas was Cass's strongest state by far, indeed the solitary state where he received over 56% of the popular vote. Whig candidate Zachary Taylor, who ultimately won the national electoral vote and was thus elected president, was the only other candidate to receive any votes. As was the case with most slave states, former President Martin Van Buren's Free Soil Party ticket did not distribute ballots in Texas.

== Results ==
1848 United States presidential election in Texas
Party	Candidate	Votes	Percentage	Electoral votes
Democratic	Lewis Cass	10,668	70.29%	4
Whig	Zachary Taylor	4,509	29.71%	0
Total		15,177	100.0%	4

== See also ==
- United States presidential elections in Texas
