= 1852 United States presidential election in Texas =

- November 2, 1852

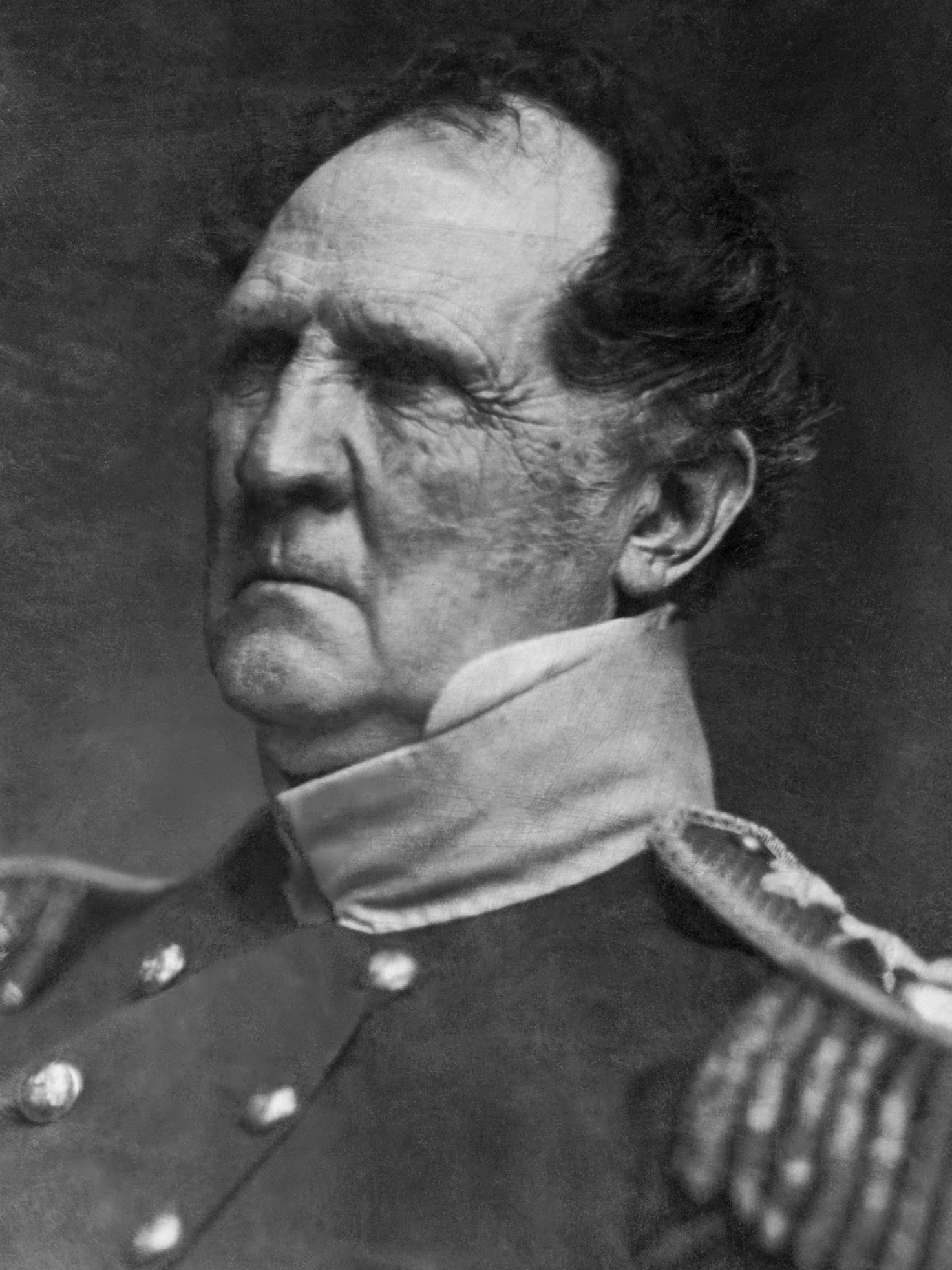
Nominee	Franklin Pierce	Winfield Scott
Party	Democratic	Whig
Home state	New Hampshire	New Jersey
Running mate	William R. King	William Alexander Graham
Electoral vote	4	0
Popular vote	13,552	4,995
Percentage	73.07%	26.93%
County results
Pierce
50–60%
60–70%
70–80%
80–90%
90–100%
President before election
Millard Fillmore
Whig
Elected President
Franklin Pierce
Democratic

The 1852 United States presidential election in Texas was held on November 2, 1852, as part of the 1852 United States presidential election. State voters chose four electors to represent the state in the Electoral College, which chose the president and vice president.

Texas voted for the Democratic nominee Franklin Pierce, who received 73.068% of Texas's votes. Texas was Pierce's strongest state by about 9% (Georgia was 2nd with 62.7% of the vote from the state).

== Results ==
1852 United States presidential election in Texas
Party	Candidate	Votes	Percentage	Electoral votes
Democratic	Franklin Pierce	13,552	73.068%	4
Whig	Winfield Scott	4,995	26.932%	0
Total		18,547	100.0%	4

== See also ==
- United States presidential elections in Texas
