= 1904 United States presidential election in Texas =

- November 8, 1904
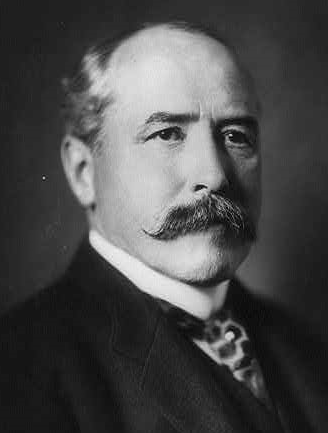

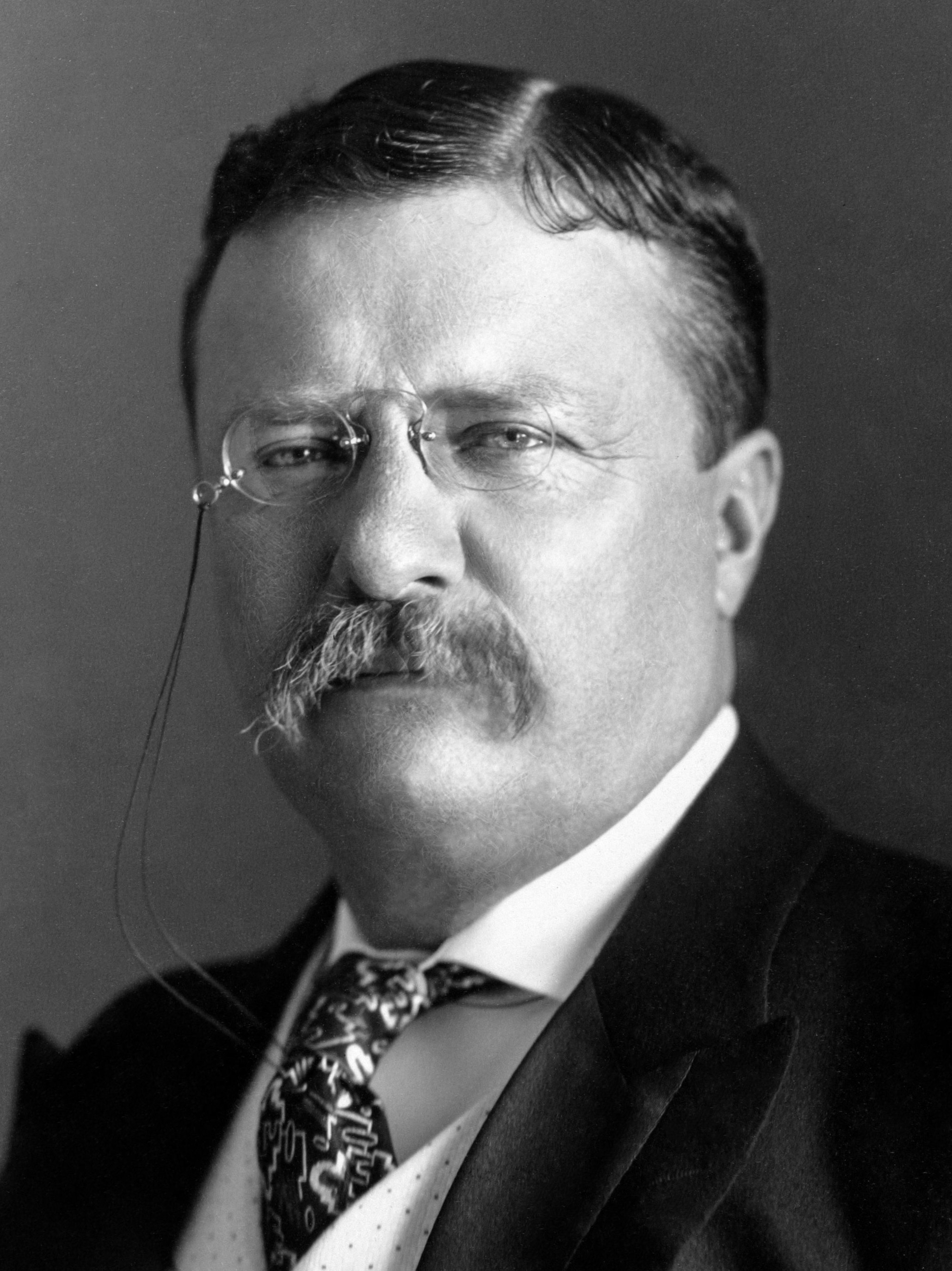
Nominee	Alton B. Parker	Theodore Roosevelt
Party	Democratic	Republican
Home state	New York	New York
Running mate	Henry G. Davis	Charles W. Fairbanks
Electoral vote	18	0
Popular vote	167,200	51,242
Percentage	71.45%	21.90%
County results
Parker
50–60%
60–70%
70–80%
80–90%
90–100%
Roosevelt
50–60%
60–70%
70–80%
90–100%
President before election
Theodore Roosevelt
Republican
Elected President
Theodore Roosevelt
Republican

The 1904 United States presidential election in Texas took place on November 8, 1904. All contemporary 45 states were part of the 1904 United States presidential election. Texas voters chose 18 electors to the Electoral College, which selected the president and vice president.

Texas was won by the Democratic nominees, Chief Judge Alton B. Parker of New York and his running mate Henry G. Davis of West Virginia. They defeated the Republican nominees, incumbent President Theodore Roosevelt and his running mate Charles W. Fairbanks of Indiana. Parker won Texas by a margin of 49.55%.

This election arguably marked the end of Reconstruction in Texas, with voter turnout plunging by over half following the introduction of poll taxes in the state two years prior. With 71.45% of the popular vote, Texas would prove to be Parker's fifth strongest state in the 1904 presidential election after South Carolina, Mississippi, neighboring Louisiana and Alabama. Duval County would not vote Republican for president again until 2024.

== Results ==
1904 United States presidential election in Texas
Party	Candidate	Votes	Percentage	Electoral votes
Democratic	Alton B. Parker	167,200	71.45%	18
Republican	Theodore Roosevelt (incumbent)	51,242	21.90%	0
Populist	Thomas E. Watson	8,062	3.45%	0
Prohibition	Silas C. Swallow	4,292	1.83%	0
Social Democratic	Eugene V. Debs	2,791	1.19%	0
Socialist Labor	Charles Hunter Corregan	421	0.18%	0
Totals		234,008	100.00%	18
Voter turnout				—

== See also ==
- United States presidential elections in Texas
