= 1888 United States presidential election in Texas =

- November 6, 1888
- Turnout: 22.27% of the total population ▲2.09 pp
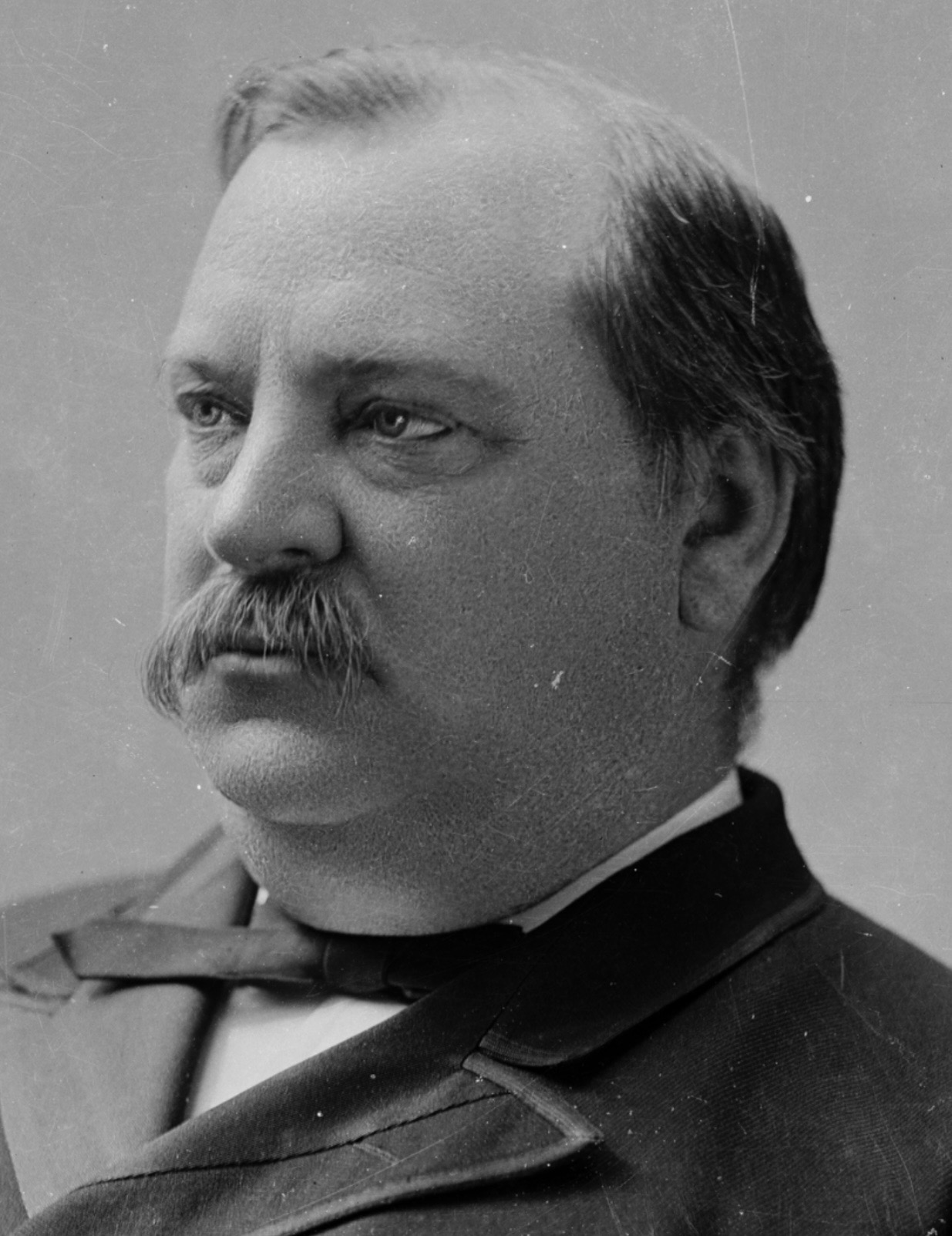

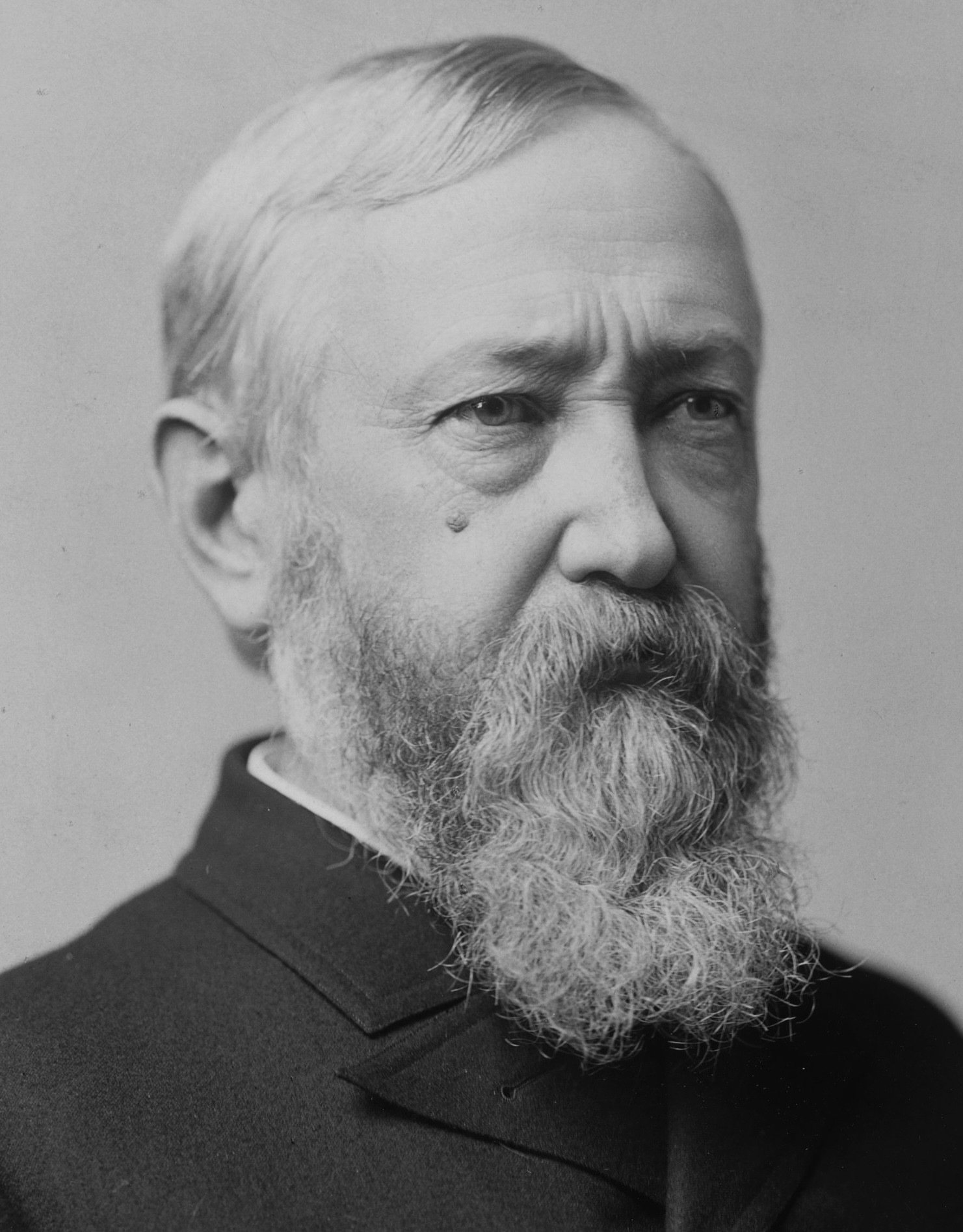

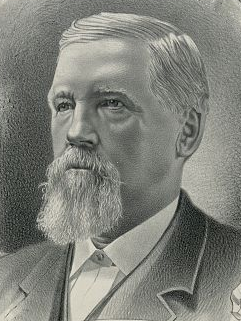
Nominee	Grover Cleveland	Benjamin Harrison	Alson Streeter
Party	Democratic	Republican	Union Labor
Home state	New York	Indiana	Illinois
Running mate	Allen G. Thurman	Levi P. Morton	Charles E. Cunningham
Electoral vote	13	0	0
Popular vote	234,883	88,422	29,459
Percentage	65.70%	24.73%	8.24%
County results
Cleveland
40–50%
50–60%
60–70%
70–80%
80–90%
90–100%
Harrison
40–50%
50–60%
60–70%
70–80%
80–90%
Streeter
40–50%
President before election
Grover Cleveland
Democratic
Elected President
Benjamin Harrison
Republican

The 1888 United States presidential election in Texas took place on November 6, 1888, as part of the 1888 United States presidential election. State voters chose 13 representatives, or electors, to the Electoral College, who voted for president and vice president.

Texas was won by the incumbent President Grover Cleveland (D–New York), running with the former Senator and Chief Justice of the Supreme Court of Ohio Allen G. Thurman, with 65.70% of the popular vote, against former Senator Benjamin Harrison (R-Indiana), running with Levi P. Morton, the 31st governor of New York, with 24.73% of the vote and former Illinois state representative Alson Streeter (UL–Illinois), running with Charles E. Cunningham, with 8.24% of the vote.

The Prohibition Party ran brigadier general Clinton B. Fisk and John A. Brooks and received 1.33% of the vote.

== Campaign ==
Members of the Knights of Labor and former members of the Greenback Party attended a convention in Waco on July 5, 1887, and formed an affiliate of the Union Labor Party. Around 300 delegates, mostly members of the Farmers' Alliance, from seventy counties attended a convention on May 15, 1888, to consider possible electoral campaigns. The delegates appointed Mayor H.S. Broiles as a one-man executive committee and he called for a Nonpartisan Convention to be held on July 2–3. The Nonpartisan Convention created a platform and slate of candidates. The ULP endorsed these candidates and platform and William R. Lamb, the chair of the Nonpartisan Convention, was given a seat on the ULP executive committee.

== Results ==
1888 United States presidential election in Texas
Party	Candidate	Running mate	Popular vote		Electoral vote	
Party	Candidate	Running mate	Count	%	Count	%
Democratic	Grover Cleveland of New York (incumbent)	Allen G. Thurman of Ohio	234,883	65.70%	13	100.00%
Republican	Benjamin Harrison of Indiana	Levi P. Morton of New York	88,422	24.73%	0	0.00%
Union Labor	Alson Streeter of Illinois	Charles E. Cunningham of Arkansas	29,459	8.24%	0	0.00%
Prohibition	Clinton B. Fisk of New Jersey	John A. Brooks of Missouri	4,749	1.33%	0	0.00%
Total			357,513	100.00%	13	100.00%

The electors in Texas for Grover Cleveland were as follows, according to an October 27, 1888 edition of The Lampasas Leader: State at large- A. W. Terrell, J. W. Bailey 1st District- A. T. McKinney 2nd District- E. C. Dickinson 3rd District- R. C. DeGrafenried 4th District- Howard Templeton 5th District- J. H. Cobb 6th District- J. S. Woods 7th District- G. A. Levi 8th District- W. S. Fly 9th District- W. H. Richardson 10th District- J. H. McLeary 11th District- W. H. Cowan

== See also ==
- United States presidential elections in Texas

== Works cited ==
- Hild, Matthew (2015). "The Knights of Labor and the Third-Party Movement in Texas, 1886–1896". The Southwestern Historical Quarterly. 119 (1). Texas State Historical Association: 24–43. doi:10.2307/447112. JSTOR 24388910.
