= 1884 United States presidential election in Texas =

- November 4, 1884

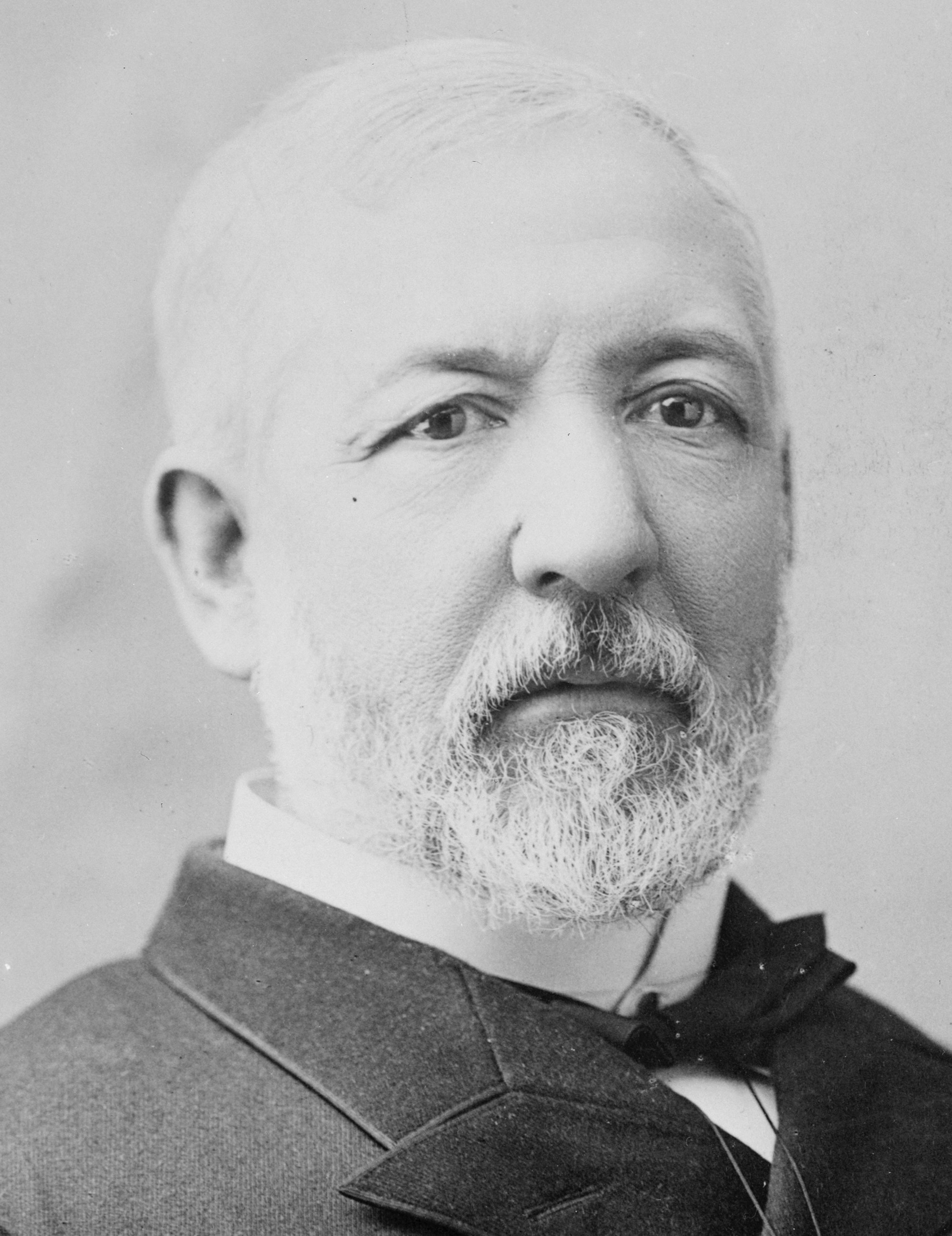
| Nominee | Grover Cleveland | James G. Blaine |
| Party | Democratic | Republican |
| Home state | New York | Maine |
| Running mate | Thomas A. Hendricks | John A. Logan |
| Electoral vote | 13 | 0 |
| Popular vote | 225,309 | 93,141 |
| Percentage | 69.26% | 28.63% |
County results
Cleveland
50–60%
60–70%
70–80%
80–90%
90–100%
Blaine
50–60%
60–70%
70–80%
80–90%
President before election
Chester A. Arthur
Republican
Elected President
Grover Cleveland
Democratic

The 1884 United States presidential election in Texas was held on November 4, 1884, as part of the 1884 United States presidential election. State voters chose 13 electors to represent the state in the Electoral College, which chose the president and vice president.

Texas voted for the Democratic nominee Grover Cleveland, who received 69.3% of the vote. With 69.3% of the popular vote, Texas would prove to be Cleveland's second strongest state only after South Carolina.

== Results ==
1884 United States presidential election in Texas
| Party | Candidate | Votes | Percentage | Electoral votes |
|---|---|---|---|---|
| Democratic | Grover Cleveland | 225,309 | 69.26% | 13 |
| Republican | James G. Blaine | 93,141 | 28.63% | 0 |
| Prohibition | John St. John | 3,534 | 1.09% | 0 |
| Greenback | Benjamin Butler | 3,321 | 1.02% | 0 |
| Total | | 325,305 | 100.0% | 13 |

== See also ==
- United States presidential elections in Texas
