= 1880 United States presidential election in Texas =

- November 2, 1880
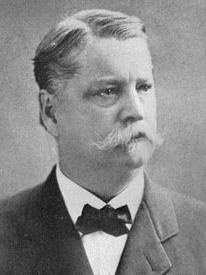

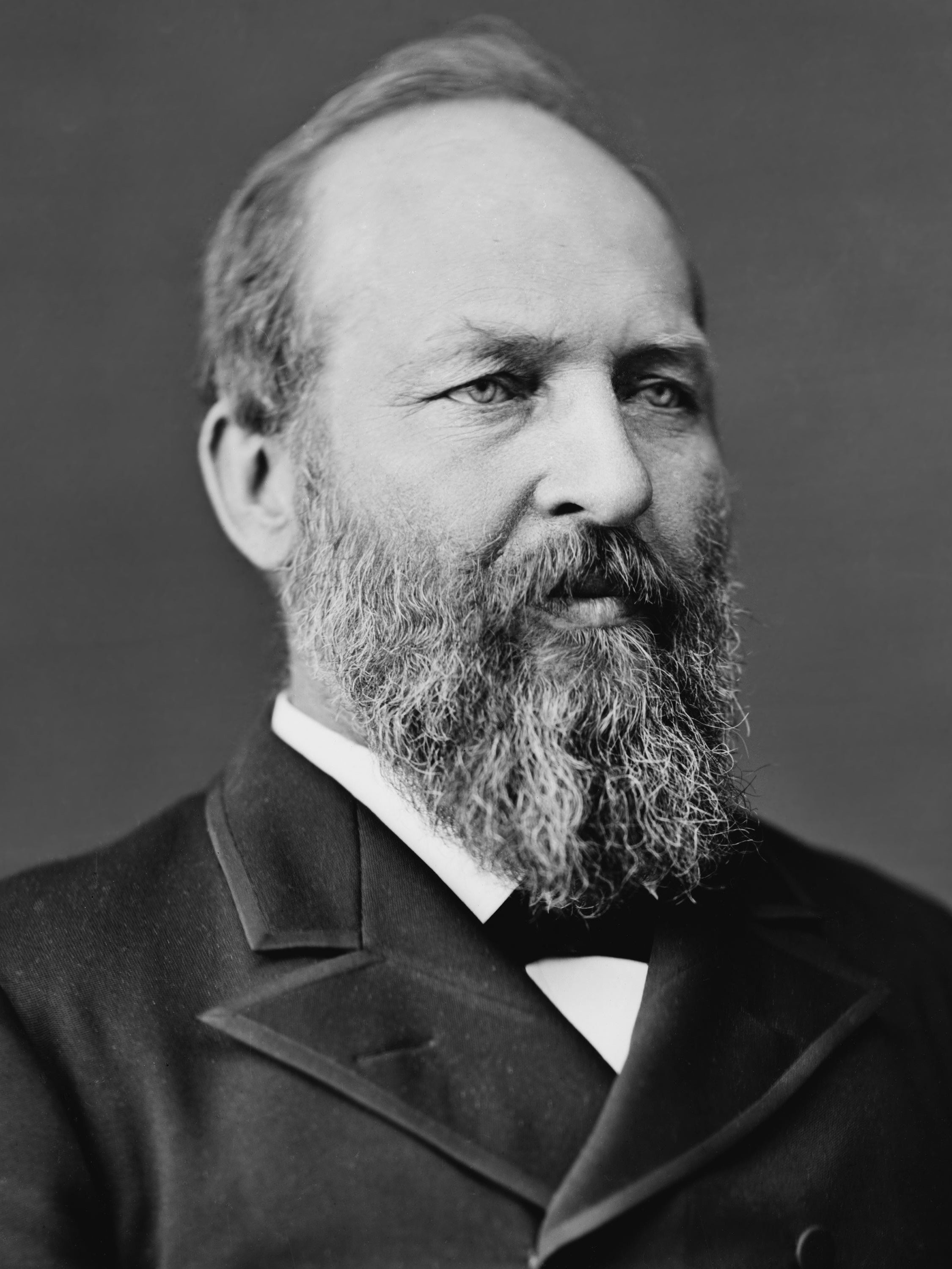

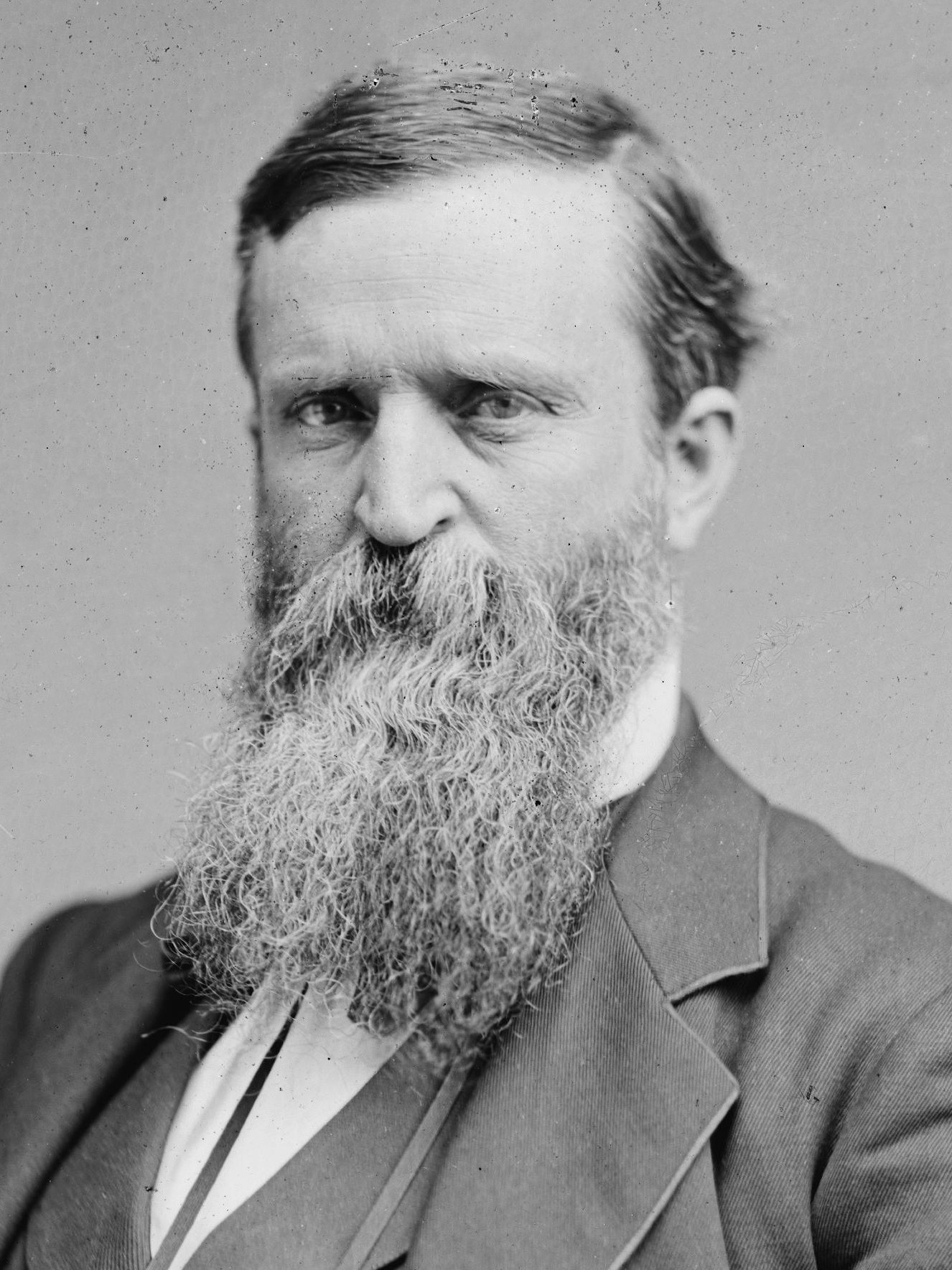
Nominee	Winfield Scott Hancock	James A. Garfield	James B. Weaver
Party	Democratic	Republican	Greenback
Home state	Pennsylvania	Ohio	Iowa
Running mate	William Hayden English	Chester A. Arthur	Barzillai J. Chambers
Electoral vote	8	0	0
Popular vote	156,428	57,893	27,405
Percentage	64.71%	23.95%	11.34%
County results
Hancock
40–50%
50–60%
60–70%
70–80%
80–90%
90–100%
Garfield
40–50%
50–60%
60–70%
70–80%
80–90%
Weaver
50–60%
President before election
Rutherford B. Hayes
Republican
Elected President
James A. Garfield
Republican

The 1880 United States presidential election in Texas was held on November 2, 1880, as part of the 1880 United States presidential election. State voters chose eight electors to represent the state in the Electoral College, which chose the president and vice president.

Texas voted for the Democratic nominee Winfield Scott Hancock, who received 64% of the vote. Texas was Hancock's fourth-strongest state. It was also the strongest state for Greenback candidate James B. Weaver, who received 11.34% of the vote.

== Results ==
1880 United States presidential election in Texas
Party	Candidate	Votes	Percentage	Electoral votes
Democratic	Winfield Scott Hancock	156,428	64.71%	8
Republican	James A. Garfield	57,893	23.95%	0
Greenback Party	James B. Weaver	27,405	11.34%	0
Total		241,726	100.0%	8

== See also ==
- United States presidential elections in Texas
