= Warlock (disambiguation) =

The term warlock comes from the Old English wǣrloga, which meant oath-breaker or traitor. It was used in early Christian England for someone who had betrayed their faith or community, and later became associated with men believed to have made pacts with the devil.

Warlock or The Warlock may also refer to:

== Books, comic books and television ==
=== Characters ===
- Adam Warlock, a Marvel Comics fictional cosmic being
- Maha Yogi, a Marvel Universe character also known as "Warlock"
- Warlock (Artemis Fowl), a type of fairy in the Artemis Fowl series
- Warlock (Charmed), male and female characters in the television series Charmed
- Warlock (New Mutants), an alien character in Marvel Comics associated with the New Mutants
- The children of Lilith, half demon and half human, in The Mortal Instruments series
- The Warlock, a supervillain from The New Adventures of Superman
- Rear Admiral Solomon "Warlock" Bates, a fictional character in the 2022 film Top Gun: Maverick

=== Novels ===
- Warlock (Cartmel novel), a Doctor Who new adventure
- Warlock (Hall novel), a 1958 western novel by Oakley Hall
- Häxmästaren or Heksemesteren (The Warlock in English), a series of books by Margit Sandemo
- Storm Over Warlock, a book by Andre Norton published in 1960
- Warlock (Smith novel), a 2001 novel by Wilbur Smith
- The Warlock: The Secrets of the Immortal Nicholas Flamel, a 2011 fantasy novel by Michael Scott

=== Other ===
- Warlock (magazine), a magazine for Fighting Fantasy
- "Warlock" (The Avengers), an episode of the 1960s espionage television series The Avengers

== Film ==
- Warlock (1959 film), a western film based on the 1958 novel of the same name
- Warlock (1989 film), a horror film
  - Warlock: The Armageddon (1993), a sequel to the 1989 horror film
  - Warlock III: The End of Innocence (1999), the third installment in the Warlock horror film series

== Gaming ==
- Warlock (Dungeons & Dragons), a character class in Dungeons & Dragons
- Warlock (video game), a 1994 video game for Sega Genesis and Super Nintendo Entertainment System
- Warlock (World of Warcraft), the name of a class in the video game World of Warcraft
- Warlock: Master of the Arcane, a 2012 turn-based strategy video game
- Warlock: The Avenger, a computer game for Amiga
- Warlock, a character class in the Destiny video game franchise
- Warlock, a card type in Magic the Gathering

== Music ==
- Peter Warlock (1894–1930), English composer

=== Groups ===
- Warlock (band), a German heavy metal band from Düsseldorf
- Warlocks (band), a Norwegian hip hop group
- The Warlocks, a psychedelic rock band
- The Warlocks, the original name of the American rock band Grateful Dead
- The Warlocks, the original name of the American rock band the Velvet Underground
- The Warlocks, the original name of the American rock band American Blues which included two future members of ZZ Top

=== Other music ===
- Warlock (guitar), a guitar model by B.C. Rich guitars
- "Warlocks" (song), a song from the 2006 album Stadium Arcadum by the Red Hot Chili Peppers

== Transportation ==
- Warlock, renamed John G. Griffiths in 1908, a GWR 3031 Class locomotive
- Dodge Warlock, a pickup truck offered by Chrysler Corporation

== Visual arts ==
- The Warlock, 1875 and 1880 paintings by Carl Spitzweg

== Other use ==
- Warlock, Texas, an unincorporated community in the United States
- Warlock (horse), a racehorse

== See also ==
- Warlocks Motorcycle Club (disambiguation)
