= 1892 United States presidential election in Alabama =

- November 8, 1892

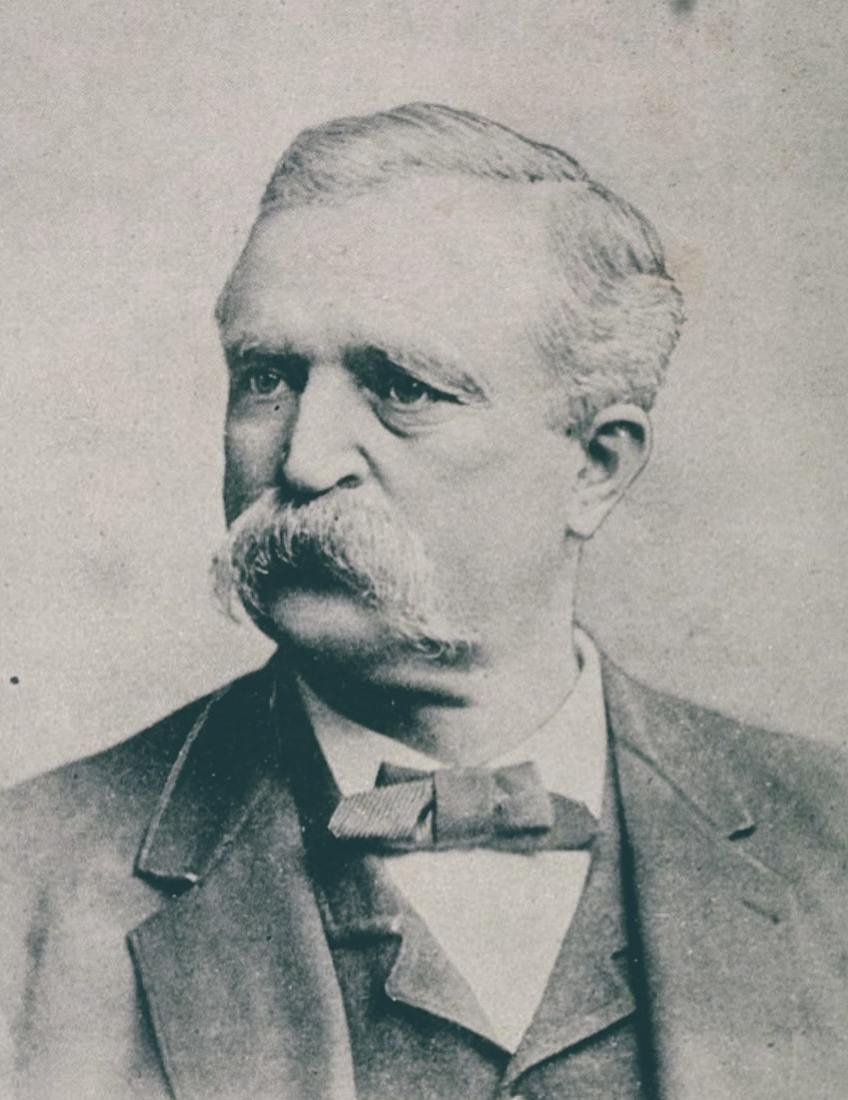
Nominee	Grover Cleveland	James B. Weaver
Party	Democratic	Populist
Alliance		Republican
Home state	New York	Iowa
Running mate	Adlai Stevenson I	James G. Field
Electoral vote	11	0
Popular vote	138,135	84,984
Percentage	59.40%	36.55%
County results
Cleveland
40–50%
50–60%
60–70%
70–80%
80–90%
Weaver
40–50%
50–60%
60–70%
70–80%
President before election
Benjamin Harrison
Republican
Elected President
Grover Cleveland
Democratic

The 1892 United States presidential election in Alabama took place on November 8, 1892. All contemporary 44 states were part of the 1892 United States presidential election. Alabama voters chose eleven electors to the Electoral College, which selected the president and vice president.

Alabama was won by the Democratic nominees, former President Grover Cleveland of New York and his running mate Adlai Stevenson I of Illinois. However, Weaver performed well in the South as he won counties in Alabama, Georgia, Mississippi, North Carolina, and Texas. Weaver was endorsed by a majority of Republicans in a fusion arrangement, while a minority of Republicans running a straight party ticket for Harrison. Populists did best in Alabama, where electoral chicanery probably carried the day for Democrats.

== Campaign ==
Weaver won sixteen counties, five were in the Black Belt while the remainder were white counties.

== Results ==
1892 United States presidential election in Alabama
Party	Candidate	Votes	Percentage	Electoral votes
Democratic	Grover Cleveland	138,135	59.40%	11
People's	James B. Weaver	84,984	36.55%	0
Republican	Benjamin Harrison (incumbent)	9,184	3.95%	0
Prohibition	John Bidwell	240	0.10%	0
Totals		232,543	100.00%	11
Voter turnout				—

=== Results by county ===
County	Grover Cleveland Democratic		Benjamin Harrison Republican		James B. Weaver People's		John Bidwell Prohibition		Margin (Note: Because Cleveland and Weaver ran in the top two places in Alabama as a whole, margins given are Cleveland vote minus Weaver vote and Cleveland percentage minus Weaver percentage unless states otherwise.)		Total votes cast
County	#	%	#	%	#	%	#	%	#	%	Total votes cast
Autauga	926	47.24%	81	4.13%	951	48.52%	2	0.10%	−25	−1.28%	1,960
Baldwin	912	65.99%	382	27.64%	86	6.22%	2	0.14%	826 (Note: In this county where Harrison did run second ahead of Weaver, margin given is Cleveland vote minus Harrison vote and percentage margin Cleveland percentage minus Harrison percentage.)	59.77%	1,382
Barbour	4,315	77.40%	19	0.34%	1,241	22.26%	0	0.00%	3,074	55.14%	5,575
Bibb	1,152	48.32%	22	0.92%	1,204	50.50%	6	0.25%	−52	−2.18%	2,384
Blount	1,944	58.80%	58	1.75%	1,304	39.44%	0	0.00%	640	19.36%	3,306
Bullock	1,844	54.20%	75	2.20%	1,483	43.59%	0	0.00%	361	10.61%	3,402
Butler	1,313	39.99%	253	7.71%	1,717	52.30%	0	0.00%	−404	−12.31%	3,283
Calhoun	3,249	63.91%	218	4.29%	1,613	31.73%	4	0.08%	1,636	32.18%	5,084
Chambers	2,321	55.98%	108	2.60%	1,717	41.41%	0	0.00%	604	14.57%	4,146
Cherokee	1,709	54.24%	139	4.41%	1,301	41.29%	2	0.06%	408	12.95%	3,151
Chilton	648	38.78%	121	7.24%	902	53.98%	0	0.00%	−254	−15.20%	1,671
Choctaw	864	41.58%	216	10.39%	998	48.03%	0	0.00%	−134	−6.45%	2,078
Clarke	1,561	52.49%	371	12.47%	1,042	35.04%	0	0.00%	519	17.45%	2,974
Clay	1,161	50.24%	47	2.03%	1,103	47.73%	0	0.00%	58	2.51%	2,311
Cleburne	1,045	59.58%	47	2.68%	659	37.57%	3	0.17%	386	22.01%	1,754
Coffee	992	51.06%	47	2.42%	899	46.27%	5	0.26%	93	4.79%	1,943
Colbert	1,960	56.48%	0	0.00%	1,510	43.52%	0	0.00%	450	12.97%	3,470
Conecuh	877	35.01%	0	0.00%	1,628	64.99%	0	0.00%	−751	−29.98%	2,505
Coosa	954	40.49%	107	4.54%	1,295	54.97%	0	0.00%	−341	−14.47%	2,356
Covington	840	59.57%	7	0.50%	562	39.86%	1	0.07%	278	19.72%	1,410
Crenshaw	1,320	49.87%	49	1.85%	1,278	48.28%	0	0.00%	42	1.59%	2,647
Cullman	1,066	50.69%	6	0.29%	1,023	48.64%	8	0.38%	43	2.04%	2,103
Dale	1,460	56.48%	15	0.58%	1,109	42.90%	1	0.04%	351	13.58%	2,585
Dallas	7,339	78.80%	1,028	11.04%	947	10.17%	0	0.00%	6,392	68.63%	9,314
DeKalb	1,868	61.01%	5	0.16%	1,187	38.77%	2	0.07%	681	22.24%	3,062
Elmore	1,258	32.68%	84	2.18%	2,506	65.11%	1	0.03%	−1,248	−32.42%	3,849
Escambia	1,110	62.05%	21	1.17%	657	36.72%	1	0.06%	453	25.32%	1,789
Etowah	2,225	58.85%	269	7.11%	1,266	33.48%	21	0.56%	959	25.36%	3,781
Fayette	728	42.37%	158	9.20%	822	47.85%	10	0.58%	−94	−5.47%	1,718
Franklin	1,290	67.12%	23	1.20%	609	31.69%	0	0.00%	681	35.43%	1,922
Geneva	797	52.61%	0	0.00%	715	47.19%	3	0.20%	82	5.41%	1,515
Greene	2,129	71.09%	355	11.85%	511	17.06%	0	0.00%	1,618	54.02%	2,995
Hale	3,350	78.03%	121	2.82%	822	19.15%	0	0.00%	2,528	58.89%	4,293
Henry	2,712	66.80%	133	3.28%	1,215	29.93%	0	0.00%	1,497	36.87%	4,060
Jackson	3,044	65.01%	0	0.00%	1,633	34.88%	5	0.11%	1,411	30.14%	4,682
Jefferson	10,055	65.70%	296	1.93%	4,884	31.91%	69	0.45%	5,171	33.79%	15,304
Lamar	1,458	70.20%	31	1.49%	587	28.26%	1	0.05%	871	41.94%	2,077
Lauderdale	2,352	64.53%	0	0.00%	1,289	35.36%	4	0.11%	1,063	29.16%	3,645
Lawrence	1,516	43.48%	3	0.09%	1,961	56.24%	7	0.20%	−445	−12.76%	3,487
Lee	2,760	61.99%	318	7.14%	1,374	30.86%	0	0.00%	1,386	31.13%	4,452
Limestone	1,447	43.40%	18	0.54%	1,858	55.73%	11	0.33%	−411	−12.33%	3,334
Lowndes	3,238	75.25%	349	8.11%	716	16.64%	0	0.00%	2,522	58.61%	4,303
Macon	200	21.81%	13	1.42%	704	76.77%	0	0.00%	−504	−54.96%	917
Madison	3,046	45.72%	3	0.05%	3,607	54.13%	7	0.11%	−561	−8.42%	6,663
Marengo	2,847	53.94%	233	4.41%	2,198	41.64%	0	0.00%	649	12.30%	5,278
Marion	1,207	71.46%	7	0.41%	472	27.95%	3	0.18%	735	43.52%	1,689
Marshall	1,521	57.90%	1	0.04%	1,103	41.99%	2	0.08%	418	15.91%	2,627
Mobile	4,680	66.33%	397	5.63%	1,979	28.05%	0	0.00%	2,701	38.28%	7,056
Monroe	1,850	72.35%	8	0.31%	699	27.34%	0	0.00%	1,151	45.01%	2,557
Montgomery	3,702	57.02%	7	0.11%	2,784	42.88%	0	0.00%	918	14.14%	6,493
Morgan	2,160	50.07%	3	0.07%	2,125	49.26%	26	0.60%	35	0.81%	4,314
Perry	3,452	81.26%	48	1.13%	748	17.61%	0	0.00%	2,704	63.65%	4,248
Pickens	1,919	63.59%	83	2.75%	1,009	33.43%	7	0.23%	910	30.15%	3,018
Pike	2,298	60.55%	42	1.11%	1,455	38.34%	0	0.00%	843	22.21%	3,795
Randolph	1,196	46.59%	126	4.91%	1,245	48.50%	0	0.00%	−49	−1.91%	2,567
Russell	2,150	58.65%	10	0.27%	1,506	41.08%	0	0.00%	644	17.57%	3,666
Shelby	1,755	48.00%	307	8.40%	1,593	43.57%	1	0.03%	162	4.43%	3,656
St. Clair	1,079	41.03%	78	2.97%	1,469	55.86%	4	0.15%	−390	−14.83%	2,630
Sumter	3,185	79.11%	781	19.40%	60	1.49%	0	0.00%	3,125	77.62%	4,026
Talladega	2,638	49.46%	108	2.02%	2,577	48.31%	11	0.21%	61	1.14%	5,334
Tallapoosa	2,470	57.94%	306	7.18%	1,487	34.88%	0	0.00%	983	23.06%	4,263
Tuscaloosa	2,212	51.85%	708	16.60%	1,342	31.46%	4	0.09%	870	20.39%	4,266
Walker	1,583	51.68%	4	0.13%	1,472	48.06%	4	0.13%	111	3.62%	3,063
Washington	663	80.95%	94	11.48%	60	7.33%	2	0.24%	603	73.63%	819
Wilcox	4,687	86.25%	215	3.96%	532	9.79%	0	0.00%	4,155	76.46%	5,434
Winston	526	47.99%	2	0.18%	568	51.82%	0	0.00%	−42	−3.83%	1,096
Totals	138,135	59.40%	9,184	3.95%	84,978	36.54%	240	0.10%	53,157	22.86%	232,537

== See also ==
- United States presidential elections in Alabama

== Works cited ==
- Knoles, George (1971). The Presidential Campaign and Election of 1892. Stanford University Press. ISBN 040450969X.
