= WMC =

WMC may refer to:

== Educational institutions ==
- Wah Medical College, a private medical college in the Punjab, Pakistan
- Wenzhou Medical College, now Wenzhou Medical University, in Wenzhou, China
- Western Michigan Christian High School, a private school in Muskegon, Michigan
- Wirral Metropolitan College, a system of colleges in the area of Birkenhead, UK
- Working Men's College, an adult education provider in London

== Media ==
- Windows Media Center, a discontinued media center application for Microsoft Windows
- Windows Media Connect, server software for Microsoft Windows computers to share and stream media to WMC clients
- WLFP (FM), a radio station (99.7 FM) licensed to Memphis, Tennessee, United States, known as WMC-FM from 1960 to 2023
- WMC (AM), a radio station (790 AM) licensed to Memphis, Tennessee, United States
- WMC-TV, a television station (channel 5 digital) licensed to Memphis, Tennessee, United States
- Women Media Center, an NGO in Pakistan
- Women's Murder Club (TV series) (2007-2008), an American TV series

== Organisations, companies and clubs ==
- War Manpower Commission, a World War II agency of the United States Government
- Warlocks Motorcycle Club (disambiguation), various "outlaw" motorcycle clubs in the US
- Westchester Medical Center, a hospital in Valhalla, New York
- Western Mining Corporation, later WMC Resources, former Australian mining company
- Wikimedians of Mainland China, an unofficial group of pro-Beijing Chinese Wikipedia editors who were investigated and sanctioned by the Wikimedia Foundation in 2021
- Wisconsin Manufacturers & Commerce, an association of manufacturers, service businesses, and chambers of commerce in Wisconsin
- WMC Mortgage (1955-2007), a defunct California mortgage lender
- Working men's club, a type of social club common in England
- World Macedonian Congress, an NGO for ethnic Macedonians
- World Methodist Council, international association of Methodist churches
- World Muaythai Council, international association for Muaythai martial arts

== Other uses ==
- Wales Millennium Centre, a performing arts centre in Cardiff, Wales
- Web Map Context, an Open Geospatial Consortium standard in GIS
- White monopoly capital, a political economic concept in South Africa
- Winter Music Conference, an annual electronic music conference

== See also ==
- MWC (disambiguation)
