= 2024 United States presidential election in Texas =

- November 5, 2024
- Turnout: 61.15% (of registered voters) ▼5.58 pp); 49.65% (of voting age population)

Nominee	Donald Trump	Kamala Harris
Party	Republican	Democratic
Home state	Florida	California
Running mate	JD Vance	Tim Walz
Electoral vote	40	0
Popular vote	6,393,597	4,835,250
Percentage	56.14%	42.46%

Trump
40–50%
50–60%
60–70%
70–80%
80–90%
90–100%
Harris
40–50%
50–60%
60–70%
70–80%
80–90%
90–100%
Tie/No data
President before election
Joe Biden
Democratic
Elected President
Donald Trump
Republican

The 2024 United States presidential election in Texas was held on Tuesday, November 5, 2024, as part of the 2024 United States presidential election in which all 50 states plus the District of Columbia participated. Texas voters chose electors to represent them in the Electoral College via a popular vote. The state of Texas had 40 electoral votes in the Electoral College, following reapportionment due to the 2020 United States census in which the state gained two seats.

Texas was considered by some pollsters and experts to be potentially in play, as the state had not backed a Republican for president by double digits since it favored Mitt Romney in 2012. This increased competitiveness was largely explained by the fast-growing Texas Triangle trending leftwards in some elections, namely in the closely-contested 2018 U.S. Senate race and the 2020 U.S. presidential election, which saw the Metroplex county of Tarrant and the Greater Austin counties of Williamson and Hays flip to the Democratic candidate for the first time in decades. However, in the 2020 state elections, predominantly Hispanic South Texas shifted significantly Republican, a trend that the rest of the state followed in the 2022 midterms. In 2024, Trump went on to win Texas by a margin of over 1.5 million votes, the largest margin of victory in the state in 2 decades in terms of absolute vote count (although Harris' 42.5% of the vote did exceed the Democratic vote percentage in the 2012 and 2004 elections within those 2 decades).

Trump’s 13.7% margin was significantly greater than his single-digit margins in 2016 and 2020. Trump significantly outperformed his polling averages in the state and became the first presidential candidate to win Texas by double digits since 2012, reversing the trend towards Democrats that Texas had exhibited in the two previous presidential elections. According to exit polls, 55% of Latinos in the state voted for Trump. This marked the first time a Republican candidate won a majority of both Asian and Latino voters in Texas, a feat that even former Governor George W. Bush did not achieve.

Trump carried all but two Texas counties located on the Mexico–United States border (El Paso County and Presidio County), and most of these border counties had some of the largest swings in the country, some shifting upwards of 20% to the right. Trump made his largest county gain in the country in 95% Hispanic Maverick County, which swung 28% to the right. Trump also won 97.7% Hispanic Starr County, the most Hispanic county in the country, the first time a Republican won the county since 1892. Harris's total of 12 counties won was the least for any Democrat in the state since George McGovern in 1972.

Trump became the first presidential candidate to receive over 6 million votes in Texas, setting a record for the most votes received by a candidate in any election in the state, as well as the largest vote total ever received by a Republican presidential candidate in any state. Greater Houston and the Dallas–Fort Worth metroplex also flipped back to supporting Trump after voting for Joe Biden in 2020.

== Primary elections ==
=== Democratic primary ===
The Texas Democratic primary was held on Super Tuesday, March 5, 2024. Incumbent president Joe Biden won the state in a landslide, with minor opposition from various other candidates, particularly in the Lower Rio Grande Valley region. Biden lost Loving County, in which there was only one ballot cast for Frankie Lozada.

Popular vote share by county Biden: 40–50%; 50–60%; 60–70%; 70–80%; 80–90%; >90%; Lozada: 100%; No votes

2024 Texas Democratic pres. primary
Candidate	Votes	%	Delegates
Joe Biden (incumbent)	831,247	84.64	244
Marianne Williamson	43,667	4.45	0
Armando Perez-Serrato	27,473	2.80	0
Dean Phillips	26,473	2.70	0
Gabriel Cornejo	17,196	1.75	0
Cenk Uygur	16,100	1.64	0
Frankie Lozada	11,311	1.15	0
Star Locke	8,602	0.88	0
Total	982,069	100%	244

=== Republican primary ===
The Texas Republican primary was held on Super Tuesday, March 5, 2024. Former president Donald Trump easily won the state and all of its delegates against Nikki Haley, who remained his only major opposition. Trump received the endorsements of U.S. senators John Cornyn and Ted Cruz, as well as Texas governor Greg Abbott, in his primary campaign.

Popular vote share by county Trump: 50–60%; 60–70%; 70–80%; 80–90%; >90%; Haley: 60–70%

Texas Republican primary, March 5, 2024
Candidate	Votes	Percentage	Actual delegate count		
Candidate	Votes	Percentage	Bound	Unbound	Total
Donald Trump	1,808,269	77.84%	161		161
Nikki Haley	405,472	17.45%			
Uncommitted	45,568	1.96%			
Ron DeSantis (withdrawn)	36,302	1.56%			
Vivek Ramaswamy (withdrawn)	10,582	0.46%			
Chris Christie (withdrawn)	8,938	0.38%			
Asa Hutchinson (withdrawn)	2,964	0.13%			
Ryan Binkley (withdrawn)	2,585	0.11%			
David Stuckenberg	2,339	0.10%			
Total:	2,323,019	100.00%	161		161

=== Robert F. Kennedy Jr. independent bid ===
The Texas Secretary of State's office announced on August 8 that Robert F. Kennedy Jr. would appear on the state ballot. Kennedy dropped out of the race nationally on August 23.

== General election ==
=== Candidates ===
The following presidential candidates received ballot access in Texas:

- Kamala Harris, Democratic Party
- Donald Trump, Republican Party
- Chase Oliver, Libertarian Party
- Jill Stein, Green Party
- Claudia De la Cruz, Party for Socialism and Liberation (write-in)
- Cornel West, Justice for All Party (write-in)
- Peter Sonski, American Solidarity Party (write-in)
- Shiva Ayyadurai, Independent (write-in)

In addition, Robert F. Kennedy Jr. was on the ballot under the Texas Independent Party before he suspended his campaign.

=== Predictions ===
Source	Ranking	As of
Cook Political Report	Likely R	August 27, 2024
Inside Elections	Likely R	August 29, 2024
Sabato's Crystal Ball	Likely R	September 25, 2024
Decision Desk HQ/The Hill	Likely R	October 4, 2024
CNN	Solid R	January 14, 2024
The Economist	Likely R	June 13, 2024
538	Likely R	October 5, 2024
CNalysis	Lean R	November 4, 2024
NBC News	Likely R	October 6, 2024
YouGov	Lean R	October 16, 2024
Split Ticket	Likely R	November 1, 2024

=== Polling ===
Kamala Harris vs. Donald Trump Aggregate polls

Source of poll aggregation	Dates administered	Dates updated	Kamala Harris Democratic	Donald Trump Republican	Undecided (Note: Calculated by taking the difference of 100% and all other candidates combined.)	Margin
270ToWin	October 18 – November 3, 2024	November 3, 2024	44.4%	51.8%	3.8%	Trump +7.4%
538	through November 3, 2024	November 3, 2024	43.8%	51.7%	4.5%	Trump +7.9%
Silver Bulletin	through November 3, 2024	November 3, 2024	44.3%	51.4%	4.3%	Trump +7.1%
The Hill/DDHQ	through October 29, 2024	November 3, 2024	44.2%	51.8%	4.0%	Trump +7.6%
Average			44.2%	51.7%	4.1%	Trump +7.5%

Poll source	Date(s) administered	Sample size (Note: Key: A – all adults RV – registered voters LV – likely voters V – unclear)	Margin of error	Donald Trump Republican	Kamala Harris Democratic	Other / undecided
AtlasIntel	November 3–4, 2024	2,434 (LV)	± 2.0%	55%	44%	1%
Morning Consult	October 22−31, 2024	2,120 (LV)	± 2.0%	52%	45%	3%
ActiVote	October 21−27, 2024	400 (LV)	± 4.9%	55%	45%	–
New York Times/Siena College	October 23−26, 2024	1,180 (RV)	± 3.3%	52%	41%	7%
New York Times/Siena College	October 23−26, 2024	1,180 (LV)	± 3.3%	52%	42%	6%
Rasmussen Reports (R) (Note: Poll sponsored by American Thinker)	October 24–25, 2024	1,002 (LV)	± 3.0%	50%	44%	6% (Note: "Other" with 1%)
CES/YouGov	October 1–25, 2024	6,526 (A)	–	51%	47%	2%
CES/YouGov	October 1–25, 2024	6,473 (LV)	–	51%	47%	2%
Emerson College	October 18−21, 2024	815 (LV)	± 3.4%	53%	46%	1% (Note: "Someone else" with 1%)
Emerson College	October 18−21, 2024	815 (LV)	± 3.4%	53% (Note: With voters who lean towards a given candidate)	46%	1%
Rose Institute/YouGov	October 7–17, 2024	1,108 (RV)	± 3.5%	49%	44%	7% (Note: "Other" with 7%)
Rose Institute/YouGov	October 7–17, 2024	1,108 (RV)	± 3.5%	50%	45%	5%
Rose Institute/YouGov	October 7–17, 2024	1,075 (LV)	± 3.5%	51%	46%	3%
ActiVote	September 26 − October 16, 2024	400 (LV)	± 4.9%	56%	44%	–
Morning Consult	October 6−15, 2024	2,048 (LV)	± 2.0%	50%	46%	4%
Marist College	October 3–7, 2024	1,365 (RV)	± 3.3%	52%	46%	2% (Note: "Another party's candidate" with 1%)
Marist College	October 3–7, 2024	1,186 (LV)	± 3.6%	53%	46%	1%
Mainstreet Research/Florida Atlantic University	October 2–6, 2024	811 (RV)	± 3.4%	50%	45%	5% (Note: "Another candidate" with 2%)
Mainstreet Research/Florida Atlantic University	October 2–6, 2024	775 (LV)	± 3.4%	50%	45%	5%
New York Times/Siena College	September 29 – October 6, 2024	617 (LV)	± 5.0%	50%	44%	6%
RMG Research (Note: Poll sponsored by the Napolitan Institute)	September 25–27, 2024	779 (LV)	± 3.5%	51%	45%	3% (Note: "Some other candidate" with 2%)
RMG Research	September 25–27, 2024	779 (LV)	± 3.5%	53%	46%	1%
Public Policy Polling (D) (Note: Poll commissioned by Clean and Prosperous America PAC)	September 25–26, 2024	759 (RV)	± 3.5%	51%	46%	3%
Emerson College	September 22−24, 2024	950 (LV)	± 3.1%	51%	46%	3%
Emerson College	September 22−24, 2024	950 (LV)	± 3.1%	52%	47%	1%
ActiVote	September 7−24, 2024	400 (LV)	± 4.9%	54%	46%	–
Morning Consult	September 9−18, 2024	2,716 (LV)	± 2.0%	50%	46%	4%
Morning Consult	August 30 – September 8, 2024	2,940 (LV)	± 2.0%	52%	43%	5%
Emerson College	September 3–5, 2024	845 (LV)	± 3.3%	50%	46%	4%
Emerson College	September 3–5, 2024	845 (LV)	± 3.3%	51%	48%	1% (Note: "Someone else")
YouGov (Note: Poll sponsored by the Texas Politics Project at the University of Texas)	August 23–31, 2024	1,200 (RV)	± 2.8%	49%	44%	7% (Note: "Someone else" with 3%)
ActiVote	August 14–31, 2024	400 (LV)	± 4.9%	54.5%	45.5%	–
Quantus Insights (R)	August 29–30, 2024	1,000 (RV)	± 3.1%	49%	42%	9% (Note: "Other candidate" with 3%)
Quantus Insights (R)	August 29–30, 2024	1,000 (RV)	± 3.1%	52%	44%	4% (Note: "Would not vote" with 4%)
	August 23, 2024	Robert F. Kennedy Jr. suspends his presidential campaign and endorses Donald Trump.				
Public Policy Polling (D)	August 21–22, 2024	725 (RV)	± 3.6%	49%	44%	6%
	August 19–22, 2024	Democratic National Convention				
ActiVote	July 31 – August 13, 2024	400 (LV)	± 4.9%	53%	47%	–
	August 6, 2024	Kamala Harris selects Gov. Tim Walz as her running mate.				
	July 21, 2024	Joe Biden announces his official withdrawal from the race; Kamala Harris declares her candidacy for president.				
	July 15–19, 2024	Republican National Convention				
	July 13, 2024	Attempted assassination of Donald Trump				
YouGov (Note: Poll sponsored by the Hobby School of Public Affairs at the University of Houston)	January 11–24, 2024	1,500 (RV)	± 2.5%	52%	39%	9%
Texas Hispanic Policy Foundation	May 8–17, 2023	1,000 (RV)	± 2.9%	46%	39%	15% (Note: "Don't know" with 9%; "Libertarian candidate" with 4%"; "Green Party candidate" with 2%")

Donald Trump vs. Kamala Harris vs. Cornel West vs. Jill Stein vs. Chase Oliver

Poll source	Date(s) administered	Sample size	Margin of error	Donald Trump Republican	Kamala Harris Democratic	Cornel West Independent	Jill Stein Green	Chase Oliver Libertarian	Other / undecided
AtlasIntel	November 3–4, 2024	2,434 (LV)	± 2.0%	54%	44%	−	1%	0%	1%
Cygnal (R)	October 26−28, 2024	600 (LV)	± 4.0%	51%	43%	−	2%	2%	2%
New York Times/Siena College	October 23−26, 2024	1,180 (RV)	± 3.3%	50%	40%	−	2%	2%	6%
New York Times/Siena College	October 23−26, 2024	1,180 (LV)	± 3.3%	51%	40%	−	1%	1%	7%
UT Tyler	October 14–21, 2024	1,129 (RV)	± 3.0%	51%	45%	–	1%	2%	1%
UT Tyler	October 14–21, 2024	956 (LV)	± 3.0%	51%	46%	–	1%	1%	1%
YouGov	October 2–10, 2024	1,091 (LV)	± 3.0%	51%	46%	–	2%	1%	–
CWS Research (R) (Note: Poll sponsored by Texans for Fiscal Responsibility)	October 1–4, 2024	533 (LV)	± 4.2%	48%	43%	–	2%	1%	6%
University of Houston	September 26 – October 10, 2024	1,329 (LV)	± 2.7%	51%	46%	–	1%	0%	2%
Public Policy Polling (D)	September 25–26, 2024	759 (RV)	± 3.5%	49%	44%	0%	1%	–	6%
Texas Hispanic Policy Foundation	September 13–18, 2024	1,200 (LV)	± 2.9%	50%	44%	–	1%	1%	4%
CWS Research (R) (Note: Poll sponsored by Texas Gun Rights)	September 4–9, 2024	504 (LV)	± 4.4%	51%	41%	–	0%	2%	6%
Texas Public Opinion Research/Lake Research Partners (D)	August 24–29, 2024	800 (RV)	± 3.5%	51%	43%	–	2%	2%	2%
YouGov	August 23–31, 2024	1,200 (RV)	± 2.8%	49%	44%	–	2%	0%	5%

Hypothetical polling with Robert F. Kennedy Jr.

Donald Trump vs. Kamala Harris vs. Robert F. Kennedy Jr. vs. Cornel West vs. Jill Stein vs. Chase Oliver

Poll source	Date(s) administered	Sample size	Margin of error	Donald Trump Republican	Kamala Harris Democratic	Robert Kennedy Jr Independent	Cornel West Independent	Jill Stein Green	Chase Oliver Libertarian	Other / undecided
New York Times/Siena College	September 29 – October 6, 2024	617 (LV)	± 5.0%	49%	42%	0%	0%	2%	2%	5%
Public Policy Polling (D)	August 21–22, 2024	725 (RV)	± 3.6%	45%	42%	6%	1%	0%	–	6%
University of Houston	August 5–16, 2024	1,365 (LV)	± 2.7%	50%	45%	2%	–	1%	1%	1%

Hypothetical polling with Donald Trump and Joe Biden

Donald Trump vs. Joe Biden

Poll source	Date(s) administered	Sample size	Margin of error	Donald Trump Republican	Joe Biden Democratic	Other / undecided
ActiVote	June 25 – July 18, 2024	400 (LV)	± 4.9%	54%	46%	–
Manhattan Institute	June 25–27, 2024	600 (LV)	± 4.0%	52%	41%	7%
UT Tyler	June 11–20, 2024	1,144 (RV)	± 3.7%	46%	40%	14%
UT Tyler	June 11–20, 2024	931 (LV)	± 3.8%	48%	43%	9%
YouGov	May 31 – June 9, 2024	1,200 (RV)	± 2.8%	46%	39%	15% (Note: "Someone else" with 9%)
YouGov	April 12–22, 2024	1,200 (RV)	± 3.3%	48%	40%	12% (Note: "Someone else" with 6%)
John Zogby Strategies (Note: Poll conducted for Kennedy's campaign)	April 13–21, 2024	743 (LV)	–	50%	40%	10%
Cygnal (R)	April 4–6, 2024	1,000 (RV)	± 2.9%	51%	42%	7%
Marist College	March 18–21, 2024	1,117 (RV)	± 3.8%	55%	44%	1%
Mainstreet Research/Florida Atlantic University	February 29 – March 3, 2024	489 (RV)	–	50%	42%	8%
Mainstreet Research/Florida Atlantic University	February 29 – March 3, 2024	458 (LV)	–	51%	42%	7%
UT Tyler	February 18–26, 2024	1,167 (RV)	± 3.2%	46%	42%	12%
YouGov	February 2–12, 2024	1,200 (RV)	± 3.4%	48%	41%	11% (Note: "Someone else" with 7%)
YouGov	January 11–24, 2024	1,145 (LV)	± 2.5%	49%	40%	11%
Emerson College (Note: Poll sponsored by Nexstar Media Group)	January 13–15, 2024	1,315 (RV)	± 2.6%	49%	41%	10%
YouGov	December 1–10, 2023	1,200 (RV)	± 2.8%	45%	39%	16%
YouGov	October 5–17, 2023	1,200 (RV)	± 2.8%	45%	37%	18%
Texas Hispanic Policy Foundation	May 8–17, 2023	1,000 (RV)	± 2.9%	44%	42%	14% (Note: "Don't know" with 8%; "Libertarian candidate" with 4%"; "Green Party candidate" with 2%")
CWS Research (R) (Note: Poll sponsored by Defend Texas Liberty PAC)	April 17–21, 2023	677 (LV)	± 3.8%	45%	42%	13%
Emerson College	October 17–19, 2022	1,000 (LV)	± 3.0%	47%	40%	13%
Emerson College	September 20–22, 2022	1,000 (LV)	± 3.0%	49%	40%	11%
Echelon Insights	August 31 – September 7, 2022	813 (LV)	± 4.4%	48%	43%	9%
Blueprint Polling (D)	June 8–10, 2022	603 (LV)	± 4.0%	44%	38%	17%

Donald Trump vs. Joe Biden vs. Robert F. Kennedy Jr. vs. Cornel West vs. Jill Stein

Poll source	Date(s) administered	Sample size	Margin of error	Donald Trump Republican	Joe Biden Democratic	Robert F. Kennedy Jr. Independent	Cornel West Independent	Jill Stein Green	Other / undecided
YouGov (Note: Poll sponsored by the University of Houston and Texas Southern University)	June 20 – July 1, 2024	1,484 (LV)	± 2.5%	49%	40%	5%	–	2%	4% (Note: Chase Oliver (L) with 0%)
Manhattan Institute	June 25–27, 2024	600 (LV)	± 4.0%	45%	36%	7%	1%	0%	11% (Note: "Someone else" with 2%; Chase Oliver (L) with 1%)
UT Tyler	June 11–20, 2024	1,144 (RV)	± 3.7%	46%	38%	12%	–	1%	3% (Note: Chase Oliver (L) with 3%)
UT Tyler	June 11–20, 2024	931 (LV)	± 3.8%	47%	41%	8%	–	1%	3%
YouGov	May 31 – June 9, 2024	1,200 (RV)	± 2.8%	43%	34%	8%	2%	2%	11%
YouGov	April 12–22, 2024	1,200 (RV)	± 3.3%	45%	36%	8%	2%	2%	7%
Texas Lyceum	April 12–21, 2024	926 (RV)	± 3.2%	41%	31%	11%	1%	1%	15% (Note: "Someone else" with 5%)
Texas Hispanic Policy Foundation	April 5–10, 2024	1,600 (LV)	± 2.45%	46%	34%	9%	–	2%	9% (Note: Chase Oliver (L) with 1%; Undecided with 8%)
Texas Hispanic Policy Foundation	April 5–10, 2024	1,600 (LV)	± 2.45%	48%	36%	–	–	3%	13% (Note: Chase Oliver (3) with 3%; Undecided with 10%)
Cygnal (R)	April 4–6, 2024	1,000 (RV)	± 2.9%	46%	37%	8%	1%	2%	6%
UT Tyler	February 18–26, 2024	1,167 (RV)	± 3.2%	41%	37%	13%	6%	3%	–
YouGov	February 2–12, 2024	1,200 (RV)	± 3.4%	45%	36%	6%	3%	2%	8%
Redfield & Wilton Strategies	February 1–3, 2024	605 (LV)	± 4.0%	44%	35%	6%	1%	1%	13%
Emerson College	January 13–15, 2024	1,315 (RV)	± 2.6%	46%	36%	5%	1%	1%	11%
YouGov	December 1–10, 2023	1,200 (RV)	± 2.8%	42%	34%	8%	3%	2%	12%

Donald Trump vs. Joe Biden vs. Robert F. Kennedy Jr.

Poll source	Date(s) administered	Sample size	Margin of error	Donald Trump Republican	Joe Biden Democratic	Robert F. Kennedy Jr. Independent	Other / undecided
Texas Hispanic Policy Foundation	April 5–10, 2024	1,600 (LV)	± 2.45%	46%	34%	9%	11% (Note: Jill Stein (G) with 2%; Chase Oliver (L) with 1%)
Marist College	March 18–21, 2024	1,117 (RV)	± 3.8%	48%	36%	15%	1%

Donald Trump vs. Joe Biden vs. Jill Stein

Poll source	Date(s) administered	Sample size	Margin of error	Donald Trump Republican	Joe Biden Democratic	Jill Stein Green	Other / undecided
Texas Hispanic Policy Foundation	April 5–10, 2024	1,600 (LV)	± 2.45%	48%	36%	3%	13% (Note: Undecided with 10%; Chase Oliver (L) with 3%)
YouGov	January 11–24, 2024	1,500 (RV)	± 2.5%	49%	40%	3%	8% (Note: Libertarian candidate with 1%)

Donald Trump vs. Joe Biden vs. Robert F. Kennedy Jr. vs. Joe Manchin vs. Cornel West

Poll source	Date(s) administered	Sample size	Margin of error	Donald Trump Republican	Joe Biden Democratic	Robert F. Kennedy Jr. Independent	Joe Manchin No Labels	Cornel West Independent	Other / undecided
National Public Affairs	February 6–8, 2024	807 (LV)	± 3.5%	42%	35%	6%	4%	3%	9%

Hypothetical polling with other candidates

Donald Trump vs. Robert F. Kennedy Jr.

Poll source	Date(s) administered	Sample size	Margin of error	Donald Trump Republican	Robert Kennedy Jr. Independent	Other / undecided
John Zogby Strategies	April 13–21, 2024	743 (LV)	–	45%	40%	15%

Robert F. Kennedy Jr. vs. Joe Biden

Poll source	Date(s) administered	Sample size	Margin of error	Robert Kennedy Jr. Independent	Joe Biden Democratic	Other / undecided
John Zogby Strategies	April 13–21, 2024	743 (LV)	–	53%	35%	12%

Nikki Haley vs. Joe Biden

Poll source	Date(s) administered	Sample size	Margin of error	Nikki Haley Republican	Joe Biden Democratic	Other / undecided
UT Tyler	February 18–26, 2024	1,167 (RV)	± 3.2%	42%	36%	22%
YouGov	February 2–12, 2024	1,200 (RV)	± 3.4%	31%	40%	29% (Note: "Someone else" with 21%)
YouGov	January 11–24, 2024	1,500 (RV)	± 2.5%	43%	39%	18%
YouGov	December 1–10, 2023	1,200 (RV)	± 2.8%	33%	36%	31%
YouGov	October 5–17, 2023	1,200 (RV)	± 2.8%	32%	34%	34%

Nikki Haley vs. Joe Biden vs. Robert F. Kennedy Jr. vs. Cornel West vs. Jill Stein

Poll source	Date(s) administered	Sample size	Margin of error	Nikki Haley Republican	Joe Biden Democratic	Robert F. Kennedy Jr. Independent	Cornel West Independent	Jill Stein Green	Other / undecided
UT Tyler	February 18–26, 2024	1,167 (RV)	± 3.2%	33%	36%	20%	7%	3%	1%
Redfield & Wilton Strategies	February 1–3, 2024	605 (LV)	± 4.0%	30%	32%	14%	0%	0%	24%

Ron DeSantis vs. Joe Biden

Poll source	Date(s) administered	Sample size	Margin of error	Ron DeSantis Republican	Joe Biden Democratic	Other / undecided
YouGov	December 1–10, 2023	1,200 (RV)	± 2.8%	39%	37%	24%
YouGov	October 5–17, 2023	1,200 (RV)	± 2.8%	39%	38%	24%
Texas Hispanic Policy Foundation	May 8–17, 2023	1,000 (RV)	± 2.9%	44%	42%	14% (Note: "Don't know" with 9%; "Libertarian candidate" with 3%"; "Green Party candidate" with 2%")
CWS Research (R)	April 17–21, 2023	677 (LV)	± 3.8%	44%	40%	16%
Echelon Insights	August 31 – September 7, 2022	813 (LV)	± 4.4%	44%	41%	15%

Ron DeSantis vs. Kamala Harris

Poll source	Date(s) administered	Sample size	Margin of error	Ron DeSantis Republican	Kamala Harris Democratic	Other / undecided
Texas Hispanic Policy Foundation	May 8–17, 2023	1,000 (RV)	± 2.9%	45%	40%	15% (Note: "Don't know" with 10%; "Libertarian candidate" with 3%"; "Green Party candidate" with 2%")

Vivek Ramaswamy vs. Joe Biden

Poll source	Date(s) administered	Sample size	Margin of error	Vivek Ramaswamy Republican	Joe Biden Democratic	Other / undecided
YouGov	December 1–10, 2023	1,200 (RV)	± 2.8%	34%	37%	30%
YouGov	October 5–17, 2023	1,200 (RV)	± 2.8%	33%	36%	32%

Mike Pence vs. Joe Biden

Poll source	Date(s) administered	Sample size	Margin of error	Mike Pence Republican	Joe Biden Democratic	Other / undecided
YouGov	October 5–17, 2023	1,200 (RV)	± 2.8%	29%	36%	36%

Tim Scott vs. Joe Biden

Poll source	Date(s) administered	Sample size	Margin of error	Tim Scott Republican	Joe Biden Democratic	Other / undecided
YouGov	October 5–17, 2023	1,200 (RV)	± 2.8%	33%	34%	33%

=== Results ===
State House district results: Trump 40–50% 50–60% 60–70% 70–80% 80–90% / Harris 40–50% 50–60% 60–70% 70–80%

State Senate district results: Trump 50–60% 60–70% 70–80% 80–90% / Harris 50–60% 60–70% 70–80%

2024 United States presidential election in Texas
Party	Candidate	Votes	%	±%
Republican	Donald Trump; JD Vance	6,393,597	56.14%	▲4.08%
Democratic	Kamala Harris; Tim Walz	4,835,250	42.46%	▼4.02%
Green	Jill Stein; Butch Ware	82,701	0.73%	▲0.43%
Libertarian	Chase Oliver; Mike ter Maat	68,557	0.60%	▼0.52%
Write-in		8,569	0.08%	▲0.04%
Total votes		11,388,674	100.00%	N/A

==== By county ====
County	Donald Trump Republican		Kamala Harris Democratic		Various candidates Other parties		Margin		Total
County	#	%	#	%	#	%	#	%	Total
Anderson	15,597	80.57%	3,635	18.78%	126	0.65%	11,962	61.79%	19,358
Andrews	5,205	85.89%	806	13.30%	49	0.81%	4,399	72.59%	6,060
Angelina	26,049	75.68%	8,146	23.67%	227	0.66%	17,903	52.01%	34,422
Aransas	10,090	77.43%	2,831	21.73%	110	0.84%	7,259	55.71%	13,031
Archer	4,592	89.48%	520	10.13%	20	0.39%	4,072	79.35%	5,132
Armstrong	1,029	92.79%	77	6.94%	3	0.27%	952	85.84%	1,109
Atascosa	13,142	71.25%	5,153	27.94%	149	0.81%	7,989	43.31%	18,444
Austin	12,457	80.98%	2,816	18.31%	110	0.72%	9,641	62.67%	15,383
Bailey	1,395	80.13%	332	19.07%	14	0.80%	1,063	61.06%	1,741
Bandera	10,939	80.43%	2,532	18.62%	129	0.95%	8,407	61.82%	13,600
Bastrop	23,301	58.54%	15,989	40.17%	516	1.30%	7,312	18.37%	39,806
Baylor	1,471	87.82%	184	10.99%	20	1.19%	1,287	76.84%	1,675
Bee	6,111	69.52%	2,606	29.65%	73	0.83%	3,505	39.87%	8,790
Bell	75,161	57.52%	53,973	41.31%	1,528	1.17%	21,188	16.22%	130,662
Bexar	337,545	44.51%	411,389	54.25%	9,389	1.24%	−73,844	−9.74%	758,323
Blanco	6,447	75.64%	1,973	23.15%	103	1.21%	4,474	52.49%	8,523
Borden	370	95.61%	16	4.13%	1	0.26%	354	91.47%	387
Bosque	7,969	83.22%	1,524	15.91%	83	0.87%	6,445	67.30%	9,576
Bowie	27,122	74.01%	9,282	25.33%	240	0.65%	17,840	48.68%	36,644
Brazoria	95,867	59.16%	63,976	39.48%	2,203	1.36%	31,891	19.68%	162,046
Brazos	56,671	61.63%	33,844	36.80%	1,446	1.57%	22,827	24.82%	91,961
Brewster	2,545	55.59%	1,969	43.01%	64	1.40%	576	12.58%	4,578
Briscoe	666	89.40%	72	9.66%	7	0.94%	594	79.73%	745
Brooks	1,077	44.84%	1,308	54.45%	17	0.71%	−231	−9.62%	2,402
Brown	14,593	86.59%	2,132	12.65%	128	0.76%	12,461	73.94%	16,853
Burleson	7,590	81.01%	1,705	18.20%	74	0.79%	5,885	62.81%	9,369
Burnet	21,795	77.42%	6,114	21.72%	244	0.87%	15,681	55.70%	28,153
Caldwell	8,880	56.59%	6,618	42.17%	195	1.24%	2,262	14.41%	15,693
Calhoun	5,939	75.83%	1,853	23.66%	40	0.51%	4,086	52.17%	7,832
Callahan	6,180	88.44%	761	10.89%	47	0.67%	5,419	77.55%	6,988
Cameron	60,991	52.51%	54,258	46.71%	904	0.78%	6,733	5.80%	116,153
Camp	4,011	76.52%	1,201	22.91%	30	0.57%	2,810	53.61%	5,242
Carson	2,866	90.21%	290	9.13%	21	0.66%	2,576	81.08%	3,177
Cass	11,693	82.68%	2,406	17.01%	44	0.31%	9,287	65.66%	14,143
Castro	1,594	78.79%	418	20.66%	11	0.54%	1,176	58.13%	2,023
Chambers	20,567	82.36%	4,192	16.79%	214	0.86%	16,375	65.57%	24,973
Cherokee	16,593	80.91%	3,744	18.26%	170	0.83%	12,849	62.66%	20,507
Childress	1,991	87.63%	263	11.58%	18	0.79%	1,728	76.06%	2,272
Clay	5,288	89.51%	584	9.88%	36	0.61%	4,704	79.62%	5,908
Cochran	735	82.31%	148	16.57%	10	1.12%	587	65.73%	893
Coke	1,623	89.47%	179	9.87%	12	0.66%	1,444	79.60%	1,814
Coleman	3,712	89.32%	428	10.30%	16	0.38%	3,284	79.02%	4,156
Collin	279,534	54.22%	222,115	43.08%	13,936	2.70%	57,419	11.14%	515,585
Collingsworth	1,066	88.76%	135	11.24%	0	0.00%	931	77.52%	1,201
Colorado	7,824	78.29%	2,108	21.09%	62	0.62%	5,716	57.19%	9,994
Comal	74,756	72.23%	27,680	26.75%	1,055	1.02%	47,076	45.49%	103,491
Comanche	5,679	86.78%	834	12.74%	31	0.47%	4,845	74.04%	6,544
Concho	1,038	86.64%	153	12.77%	7	0.58%	885	73.87%	1,198
Cooke	16,975	83.02%	3,310	16.19%	162	0.79%	13,665	66.83%	20,447
Coryell	16,688	69.75%	6,959	29.09%	279	1.17%	9,729	40.66%	23,926
Cottle	565	86.00%	89	13.55%	3	0.46%	476	72.45%	657
Crane	1,195	86.03%	186	13.39%	8	0.58%	1,009	72.64%	1,389
Crockett	1,087	76.71%	323	22.79%	7	0.49%	764	53.92%	1,417
Crosby	1,416	75.32%	451	23.99%	13	0.69%	965	51.33%	1,880
Culberson	451	57.75%	319	40.85%	11	1.41%	132	16.90%	781
Dallam	1,285	88.80%	152	10.50%	10	0.69%	1,133	78.30%	1,447
Dallas	322,569	37.96%	511,118	60.14%	16,185	1.90%	-188,549	-22.19%	849,872
Dawson	2,810	79.99%	667	18.99%	36	1.02%	2,143	61.00%	3,513
Deaf Smith	3,233	75.43%	1,019	23.78%	34	0.79%	2,214	51.66%	4,286
Delta	2,250	84.65%	397	14.94%	11	0.41%	1,853	69.71%	2,658
Denton	250,521	55.77%	191,503	42.63%	7,164	1.59%	59,018	13.14%	449,188
DeWitt	6,515	83.26%	1,270	16.23%	40	0.51%	5,245	67.03%	7,825
Dickens	844	84.99%	146	14.70%	3	0.30%	698	70.29%	993
Dimmit	1,653	48.23%	1,765	51.50%	9	0.26%	-112	-3.27%	3,427
Donley	1,512	88.32%	174	10.16%	26	1.52%	1,338	78.15%	1,712
Duval	2,439	54.67%	2,003	44.90%	19	0.43%	436	9.77%	4,461
Eastland	7,397	88.44%	918	10.98%	49	0.59%	6,479	77.46%	8,364
Ector	32,429	76.10%	9,881	23.19%	305	0.72%	22,548	52.91%	42,615
Edwards	869	86.47%	133	13.23%	3	0.30%	736	73.23%	1,005
Ellis	64,763	65.05%	33,850	34.00%	944	0.95%	30,913	31.05%	99,557
El Paso	105,124	41.79%	143,156	56.91%	3,289	1.31%	-38,032	-15.12%	251,569
Erath	15,349	83.64%	2,871	15.64%	131	0.71%	12,478	68.00%	18,351
Falls	4,520	72.01%	1,713	27.29%	44	0.70%	2,807	44.72%	6,277
Fannin	13,648	83.24%	2,607	15.90%	140	0.85%	11,041	67.34%	16,395
Fayette	10,699	80.26%	2,515	18.87%	117	0.88%	8,184	61.39%	13,331
Fisher	1,487	81.26%	330	18.03%	13	0.71%	1,157	63.22%	1,830
Floyd	1,715	82.06%	358	17.13%	17	0.81%	1,357	64.93%	2,090
Foard	448	82.20%	92	16.88%	5	0.92%	356	65.32%	545
Fort Bend	173,592	47.88%	179,310	49.46%	9,622	2.65%	-5,718	-1.58%	362,524
Franklin	4,473	84.22%	813	15.31%	25	0.47%	3,660	68.91%	5,311
Freestone	7,500	82.92%	1,499	16.57%	46	0.51%	6,001	66.35%	9,045
Frio	3,060	61.88%	1,848	37.37%	37	0.75%	1,212	24.51%	4,945
Gaines	5,840	91.02%	538	8.39%	38	0.59%	5,302	82.64%	6,416
Galveston	100,295	63.08%	56,732	35.68%	1,969	1.24%	43,563	27.40%	158,996
Garza	1,374	85.93%	213	13.32%	12	0.75%	1,161	72.61%	1,599
Gillespie	13,202	80.05%	3,160	19.16%	130	0.79%	10,042	60.89%	16,492
Glasscock	623	93.97%	38	5.73%	2	0.30%	585	88.24%	663
Goliad	3,178	79.71%	778	19.51%	31	0.78%	2,400	60.20%	3,987
Gonzales	5,981	77.12%	1,729	22.30%	45	0.58%	4,252	54.83%	7,755
Gray	6,691	88.27%	845	11.15%	44	0.58%	5,846	77.12%	7,580
Grayson	50,556	76.70%	14,800	22.45%	559	0.85%	35,756	54.25%	65,915
Gregg	33,026	70.66%	13,294	28.44%	418	0.89%	19,732	42.22%	46,738
Grimes	11,197	79.69%	2,734	19.46%	120	0.85%	8,463	60.23%	14,051
Guadalupe	54,691	64.24%	29,573	34.74%	872	1.02%	25,118	29.50%	85,136
Hale	7,283	78.44%	1,903	20.50%	99	1.07%	5,380	57.94%	9,285
Hall	992	86.34%	149	12.97%	8	0.70%	843	73.37%	1,149
Hamilton	3,809	85.31%	625	14.00%	31	0.69%	3,184	71.31%	4,465
Hansford	1,842	92.15%	146	7.30%	11	0.55%	1,696	84.84%	1,999
Hardeman	1,210	86.12%	188	13.38%	7	0.50%	1,022	72.74%	1,405
Hardin	24,691	87.69%	3,347	11.89%	119	0.42%	21,344	75.80%	28,157
Harris	722,695	46.40%	808,771	51.93%	26,018	1.67%	-86,076	-5.53%	1,557,484
Harrison	22,658	74.92%	7,369	24.37%	216	0.71%	15,289	50.55%	30,243
Hartley	1,843	91.42%	163	8.09%	10	0.50%	1,680	83.33%	2,016
Haskell	1,918	85.36%	313	13.93%	16	0.71%	1,605	71.43%	2,247
Hays	58,438	46.44%	65,528	52.08%	1,861	1.48%	-7,090	-5.63%	125,827
Hemphill	1,412	87.59%	190	11.79%	10	0.62%	1,222	75.81%	1,612
Henderson	31,379	81.42%	6,919	17.95%	242	0.63%	24,460	63.47%	38,540
Hidalgo	110,760	50.98%	104,517	48.11%	1,988	0.92%	6,243	2.87%	217,265
Hill	13,669	81.82%	2,919	17.47%	118	0.71%	10,750	64.35%	16,706
Hockley	6,616	82.82%	1,323	16.56%	49	0.61%	5,293	66.26%	7,988
Hood	30,174	82.55%	6,070	16.61%	309	0.85%	24,104	65.94%	36,553
Hopkins	13,754	81.98%	2,917	17.39%	107	0.64%	10,837	64.59%	16,778
Houston	7,247	77.38%	2,065	22.05%	53	0.57%	5,182	55.33%	9,365
Howard	7,817	81.08%	1,759	18.24%	65	0.67%	6,058	62.84%	9,641
Hudspeth	759	73.12%	275	26.49%	4	0.39%	484	46.63%	1,038
Hunt	36,137	77.33%	10,212	21.85%	384	0.82%	25,925	55.47%	46,733
Hutchinson	7,273	88.22%	913	11.07%	58	0.70%	6,360	77.15%	8,244
Irion	761	87.67%	105	12.10%	2	0.23%	656	75.58%	868
Jack	3,819	90.91%	363	8.64%	19	0.45%	3,456	82.27%	4,201
Jackson	5,386	85.10%	907	14.33%	36	0.57%	4,479	70.77%	6,329
Jasper	13,162	83.09%	2,615	16.51%	64	0.40%	10,547	66.58%	15,841
Jeff Davis	699	59.79%	450	38.49%	20	1.71%	249	21.30%	1,169
Jefferson	46,596	53.98%	38,936	45.11%	782	0.91%	7,660	8.87%	86,314
Jim Hogg	725	45.74%	856	54.01%	4	0.25%	-131	-8.26%	1,585
Jim Wells	7,636	57.55%	5,577	42.03%	55	0.41%	2,059	15.52%	13,268
Johnson	60,752	75.26%	19,247	23.84%	722	0.89%	41,505	51.42%	80,721
Jones	5,988	86.20%	907	13.06%	52	0.75%	5,081	73.14%	6,947
Karnes	4,001	78.84%	1,051	20.71%	23	0.45%	2,950	58.13%	5,075
Kaufman	44,063	63.49%	24,726	35.63%	617	0.89%	19,337	27.86%	69,406
Kendall	22,668	77.33%	6,355	21.68%	292	1.00%	16,313	55.65%	29,315
Kenedy	115	72.78%	41	25.95%	2	1.27%	74	46.84%	158
Kent	390	87.64%	50	11.24%	5	1.12%	340	76.40%	445
Kerr	21,615	76.73%	6,315	22.42%	240	0.85%	15,300	54.31%	28,170
Kimble	2,126	88.44%	261	10.86%	17	0.71%	1,865	77.58%	2,404
King	129	95.56%	6	4.44%	0	0.00%	123	91.11%	135
Kinney	1,063	74.91%	346	24.38%	10	0.70%	717	50.53%	1,419
Kleberg	5,612	56.04%	4,338	43.32%	64	0.64%	1,274	12.72%	10,014
Knox	1,156	84.01%	214	15.55%	6	0.44%	942	68.46%	1,376
Lamar	17,044	80.08%	4,079	19.16%	162	0.76%	12,965	60.91%	21,285
Lamb	3,398	81.86%	729	17.56%	24	0.58%	2,669	64.30%	4,151
Lampasas	8,961	79.29%	2,232	19.75%	108	0.96%	6,729	59.54%	11,301
La Salle	1,417	60.04%	933	39.53%	10	0.42%	484	20.51%	2,360
Lavaca	9,215	87.84%	1,235	11.77%	41	0.39%	7,980	76.07%	10,491
Lee	6,724	79.90%	1,640	19.49%	51	0.61%	5,084	60.42%	8,415
Leon	7,982	88.06%	1,033	11.40%	49	0.54%	6,949	76.67%	9,064
Liberty	25,241	80.58%	5,952	19.00%	130	0.42%	19,289	61.58%	31,323
Limestone	7,081	78.03%	1,921	21.17%	73	0.80%	5,160	56.86%	9,075
Lipscomb	1,125	89.36%	123	9.77%	11	0.87%	1,002	79.59%	1,259
Live Oak	4,307	84.57%	761	14.94%	25	0.49%	3,546	69.62%	5,093
Llano	10,902	79.99%	2,613	19.17%	114	0.84%	8,289	60.82%	13,629
Loving	86	88.66%	10	10.31%	1	1.03%	76	78.35%	97
Lubbock	86,547	69.22%	37,148	29.71%	1,343	1.07%	49,399	39.51%	125,038
Lynn	2,175	84.73%	371	14.45%	21	0.82%	1,804	70.28%	2,567
Madison	4,498	81.95%	964	17.56%	27	0.49%	3,534	64.38%	5,489
Marion	3,577	75.88%	1,101	23.36%	36	0.76%	2,476	52.52%	4,714
Martin	1,825	87.61%	247	11.86%	11	0.53%	1,578	75.76%	2,083
Mason	2,076	82.15%	434	17.17%	17	0.67%	1,642	64.98%	2,527
Matagorda	9,957	74.80%	3,231	24.27%	124	0.93%	6,726	50.53%	13,312
Maverick	9,285	58.97%	6,373	40.48%	87	0.55%	2,912	18.49%	15,745
McCulloch	3,033	86.34%	455	12.95%	25	0.71%	2,578	73.38%	3,513
McLennan	64,606	64.82%	33,863	33.97%	1,203	1.21%	30,743	30.84%	99,672
McMullen	448	91.99%	37	7.60%	2	0.41%	411	84.39%	487
Medina	17,464	70.94%	6,950	28.23%	203	0.82%	10,514	42.71%	24,617
Menard	861	82.79%	170	16.35%	9	0.87%	691	66.44%	1,040
Midland	46,944	79.83%	11,351	19.30%	513	0.87%	35,593	60.52%	58,808
Milam	8,691	78.31%	2,331	21.00%	76	0.68%	6,360	57.31%	11,098
Mills	2,418	88.18%	310	11.31%	14	0.51%	2,108	76.88%	2,742
Mitchell	2,144	85.32%	352	14.01%	17	0.68%	1,792	71.31%	2,513
Montague	9,825	88.51%	1,208	10.88%	68	0.61%	8,617	77.62%	11,101
Montgomery	221,964	72.24%	82,277	26.78%	3,017	0.98%	139,687	45.46%	307,258
Moore	4,458	83.14%	860	16.04%	44	0.82%	3,598	67.10%	5,362
Morris	4,092	75.30%	1,312	24.14%	30	0.55%	2,780	51.16%	5,434
Motley	612	94.15%	35	5.38%	3	0.46%	577	88.77%	650
Nacogdoches	17,575	68.96%	7,690	30.17%	221	0.87%	9,885	38.79%	25,486
Navarro	14,983	75.55%	4,708	23.74%	140	0.71%	10,275	51.81%	19,831
Newton	4,781	83.16%	952	16.56%	16	0.28%	3,829	66.60%	5,749
Nolan	4,048	79.14%	1,020	19.94%	47	0.92%	3,028	59.20%	5,115
Nueces	67,201	55.23%	53,248	43.76%	1,229	1.01%	13,953	11.47%	121,678
Ochiltree	2,723	90.47%	269	8.94%	18	0.60%	2,454	81.53%	3,010
Oldham	895	91.89%	74	7.60%	5	0.51%	821	84.29%	974
Orange	30,191	83.08%	5,945	16.36%	202	0.56%	24,246	66.72%	36,338
Palo Pinto	11,093	83.18%	2,143	16.07%	100	0.75%	8,950	67.11%	13,336
Panola	9,500	83.05%	1,905	16.65%	34	0.30%	7,595	66.40%	11,439
Parker	75,168	82.75%	14,872	16.37%	800	0.88%	60,296	66.38%	90,840
Parmer	2,123	84.78%	368	14.70%	13	0.52%	1,755	70.09%	2,504
Pecos	3,042	71.86%	1,144	27.03%	47	1.11%	1,898	44.84%	4,233
Polk	19,216	79.10%	4,910	20.21%	166	0.68%	14,306	58.89%	24,292
Potter	23,007	71.63%	8,748	27.23%	366	1.14%	14,259	44.39%	32,121
Presidio	686	34.40%	1,289	64.64%	19	0.95%	-603	-30.24%	1,994
Rains	5,649	86.17%	869	13.26%	38	0.58%	4,780	72.91%	6,556
Randall	53,314	79.69%	12,935	19.33%	652	0.97%	40,379	60.36%	66,901
Reagan	800	84.30%	141	14.86%	8	0.84%	659	69.44%	949
Real	1,625	82.99%	315	16.09%	18	0.92%	1,310	66.91%	1,958
Red River	4,682	80.78%	1,103	19.03%	11	0.19%	3,579	61.75%	5,796
Reeves	2,340	68.04%	1,070	31.11%	29	0.84%	1,270	36.93%	3,439
Refugio	2,134	69.40%	919	29.89%	22	0.72%	1,215	39.51%	3,075
Roberts	547	95.63%	20	3.50%	5	0.87%	527	92.13%	572
Robertson	6,177	75.72%	1,926	23.61%	55	0.67%	4,251	52.11%	8,158
Rockwall	43,542	69.93%	18,092	29.05%	635	1.02%	25,450	40.87%	62,269
Runnels	3,580	88.26%	452	11.14%	24	0.59%	3,128	77.12%	4,056
Rusk	17,234	79.40%	4,337	19.98%	135	0.62%	12,897	59.42%	21,706
Sabine	4,972	89.09%	590	10.57%	19	0.34%	4,382	78.52%	5,581
San Augustine	2,917	77.85%	809	21.59%	21	0.56%	2,108	56.26%	3,747
San Jacinto	10,524	82.29%	2,175	17.01%	90	0.70%	8,349	65.28%	12,789
San Patricio	17,337	67.78%	8,025	31.37%	217	0.85%	9,312	36.40%	25,579
San Saba	2,412	89.04%	276	10.19%	21	0.78%	2,136	78.85%	2,709
Schleicher	906	81.77%	192	17.33%	10	0.90%	714	64.44%	1,108
Scurry	4,945	86.44%	734	12.83%	42	0.73%	4,211	73.61%	5,721
Shackelford	1,565	90.57%	146	8.45%	17	0.98%	1,419	82.12%	1,728
Shelby	8,164	82.07%	1,741	17.50%	43	0.43%	6,423	64.57%	9,948
Sherman	817	93.59%	48	5.50%	8	0.92%	769	88.09%	873
Smith	74,862	72.07%	28,041	26.99%	976	0.94%	46,821	45.07%	103,879
Somervell	4,493	84.87%	751	14.19%	50	0.94%	3,742	70.68%	5,294
Starr	9,487	57.77%	6,862	41.79%	72	0.44%	2,625	15.99%	16,421
Stephens	3,368	89.55%	384	10.21%	9	0.24%	2,984	79.34%	3,761
Sterling	583	92.69%	43	6.84%	3	0.48%	540	85.85%	629
Stonewall	604	84.36%	110	15.36%	2	0.28%	494	68.99%	716
Sutton	1,167	83.36%	228	16.29%	5	0.36%	939	67.07%	1,400
Swisher	1,840	81.24%	403	17.79%	22	0.97%	1,437	63.44%	2,265
Tarrant	426,626	51.82%	384,501	46.70%	12,185	1.48%	42,125	5.12%	823,312
Taylor	41,198	74.34%	13,624	24.58%	595	1.07%	27,574	49.76%	55,417
Terrell	314	77.53%	91	22.47%	0	0.00%	223	55.06%	405
Terry	2,815	82.31%	587	17.16%	18	0.53%	2,228	65.15%	3,420
Throckmorton	823	91.44%	73	8.11%	4	0.44%	750	83.33%	900
Titus	7,861	76.96%	2,275	22.27%	78	0.76%	5,586	54.69%	10,214
Tom Green	33,399	73.47%	11,585	25.48%	476	1.05%	21,814	47.99%	45,460
Travis	170,787	29.38%	398,981	68.64%	11,508	1.98%	-228,194	-39.26%	581,276
Trinity	6,136	83.21%	1,195	16.21%	43	0.58%	4,941	67.01%	7,374
Tyler	8,286	86.51%	1,249	13.04%	43	0.45%	7,037	73.47%	9,578
Upshur	16,939	85.18%	2,820	14.18%	128	0.64%	14,119	71.00%	19,887
Upton	1,149	88.18%	146	11.20%	8	0.61%	1,003	76.98%	1,303
Uvalde	6,482	66.33%	3,218	32.93%	72	0.74%	3,264	33.40%	9,772
Val Verde	9,162	62.81%	5,282	36.21%	144	0.99%	3,880	26.60%	14,588
Van Zandt	24,351	87.12%	3,450	12.34%	149	0.53%	20,901	74.78%	27,950
Victoria	25,010	70.82%	9,998	28.31%	307	0.87%	15,012	42.51%	35,315
Walker	17,515	69.57%	7,461	29.64%	199	0.79%	10,054	39.94%	25,175
Waller	17,077	61.96%	10,183	36.95%	301	1.09%	6,894	25.01%	27,561
Ward	3,115	82.74%	627	16.65%	23	0.61%	2,488	66.08%	3,765
Washington	14,020	76.96%	4,058	22.28%	139	0.76%	9,962	54.69%	18,217
Webb	33,384	50.69%	31,952	48.51%	529	0.80%	1,432	2.17%	65,865
Wharton	12,439	75.60%	3,910	23.76%	104	0.63%	8,529	51.84%	16,453
Wheeler	2,093	92.04%	169	7.43%	12	0.53%	1,924	84.61%	2,274
Wichita	31,818	71.45%	12,237	27.48%	475	1.07%	19,581	43.97%	44,530
Wilbarger	3,566	79.83%	860	19.25%	41	0.92%	2,706	60.58%	4,467
Willacy	2,856	51.34%	2,673	48.05%	34	0.61%	183	3.29%	5,563
Williamson	155,310	50.35%	147,766	47.90%	5,393	1.75%	7,544	2.45%	308,469
Wilson	20,894	76.60%	6,247	22.90%	134	0.49%	14,647	53.70%	27,275
Winkler	1,646	85.15%	283	14.64%	4	0.21%	1,363	70.51%	1,933
Wise	32,385	84.68%	5,605	14.66%	253	0.66%	26,780	70.03%	38,243
Wood	20,621	84.56%	3,618	14.84%	147	0.60%	17,003	69.72%	24,386
Yoakum	2,039	85.21%	342	14.29%	12	0.50%	1,697	70.92%	2,393
Young	7,298	87.78%	962	11.57%	54	0.65%	6,336	76.21%	8,314
Zapata	2,970	60.97%	1,877	38.53%	24	0.49%	1,093	22.44%	4,871
Zavala	1,482	42.44%	1,984	56.82%	26	0.74%	-502	-14.38%	3,492
Totals	6,393,597	56.14%	4,835,250	42.46%	159,827	1.40%	1,558,347	13.68%	11,388,674

Counties that flipped from Democratic to Republican

- Cameron (largest city: Brownsville)
- Culberson (largest city: Van Horn)
- Duval (largest city: San Diego)
- Hidalgo (largest city: McAllen)
- Maverick (largest city: Eagle Pass)
- Starr (largest city: Rio Grande City)
- Tarrant (largest city: Fort Worth)
- Webb (largest city: Laredo)
- Willacy (largest city: Raymondville)
- Williamson (largest city: Round Rock)

==== By congressional district ====
Trump won 27 of 38 congressional districts, including two that elected Democrats.

District	Trump	Harris	Representative
1st	75%	24%	Nathaniel Moran
2nd	61%	37%	Dan Crenshaw
3rd	59%	39%	Keith Self
4th	65%	33%	Pat Fallon
5th	63%	36%	Lance Gooden
6th	64%	35%	Jake Ellzey
7th	38%	59%	Lizzie Fletcher
8th	66%	32%	Morgan Luttrell
9th	27%	71%	Al Green
10th	62%	37%	Michael McCaul
11th	72%	27%	August Pfluger
12th	61%	38%	Kay Granger (118th Congress)
12th	61%	38%	Craig Goldman (119th Congress)
13th	73%	26%	Ronny Jackson
14th	66%	32%	Randy Weber
15th	58%	41%	Monica De La Cruz
16th	41%	57%	Veronica Escobar
17th	64%	35%	Pete Sessions
18th	29%	69%	Erica Lee Carter (118th Congress)
18th	29%	69%	Sylvester Turner (119th Congress)
19th	75%	24%	Jodey Arrington
20th	39%	60%	Joaquín Castro
21st	61%	38%	Chip Roy
22nd	59%	39%	Troy Nehls
23rd	57%	42%	Tony Gonzales
24th	57%	41%	Beth Van Duyne
25th	68%	31%	Roger Williams
26th	61%	38%	Michael Burgess (118th Congress)
26th	61%	38%	Brandon Gill (119th Congress)
27th	64%	35%	Michael Cloud
28th	53%	46%	Henry Cuellar
29th	39%	60%	Sylvia Garcia
30th	26%	73%	Jasmine Crockett
31st	61%	38%	John Carter
32nd	37%	60%	Colin Allred (118th Congress)
32nd	37%	60%	Julie Johnson (119th Congress)
33rd	32%	66%	Marc Veasey
34th	52%	47%	Vicente Gonzalez
35th	32%	66%	Greg Casar
36th	68%	31%	Brian Babin
37th	24%	73%	Lloyd Doggett
38th	59%	39%	Wesley Hunt

== Analysis ==
A heavily populated West South Central state, Texas is one of the fastest growing and most diverse states in the U.S. and is generally considered to be a red state, not having voted Democratic in a presidential election since 1976 and with Republicans holding all statewide offices since 1999. Texas's location in the American South and largely in the greater Bible Belt has given the Republican Party the upper hand in the state in recent decades. Trump received the most raw votes for a political candidate ever in Texas, breaking his own record from 2020 by over 500,000. The Democratic vote total fell by 425,000 between 2020 and 2024. Compared to 2020, Trump improved his performance in 233 counties while Harris improved on Biden's performance in 21 counties. Loving and Kaufman counties were the only counties in Texas to swing to the Democrats by more than 5% (Loving County has a total population of 64, making large percentage swings common).

Trump flipped 10 counties that voted for Biden in 2020, including multiple heavily Hispanic counties in the Rio Grande Valley and South Texas. Notably, he took 58% of the vote in 97.7% Hispanic Starr County, becoming the first Republican to win it since Benjamin Harrison in 1892. Trump also became the first Republican to win Duval County since Theodore Roosevelt in 1904, the first Republican to win Webb County since William Howard Taft in 1912, the first Republican to win Maverick County since Herbert Hoover in 1928, the first Republican to win Hidalgo County and Willacy County since Richard Nixon in 1972, and the first Republican to win Cameron County and Culberson County since George W. Bush in 2004. Most of these South Texas counties have some of the lowest levels of educational attainment in the country, with Trump winning 48% of non-white voters without college degrees per the exit poll.

Trump won the three largest metro areas in Texas: Dallas-Fort Worth (by a margin of about 7 percentage points), Greater Houston (also by about 7 percentage points), and Greater San Antonio (by about 5 percentage points). Trump also carried every other metro area in the state except for Greater Austin and El Paso (though he greatly improved on his 2020 margins in both of these).

Trump made his three largest county gains in the United States compared to 2020 in Maverick County, Texas (by 27.95%), Webb County, Texas (by 25.43%), and Imperial County, California (by 25.23%). All three counties are heavily populated by Mexican Americans, located along the Mexico–United States border. Harris significantly underperformed Biden among Hispanic voters, including Mexican American voters. California and Texas are both over 25% Mexican American. Even though Harris won El Paso County, the Democratic margin of victory was reduced by 20% from 2020, with Trump winning 42% of the vote in the county. This was the highest vote share in the county by a Republican nominee since 2004, when former Governor of Texas George W. Bush won 43% of the vote in the county.

Amongst the states, Texas had the sixth-largest swing to Republican in this election, with Trump increasing his margin of victory from 2020 by 8.1%. It was also the second largest swing to Republican (after Florida) in a state that he won.

=== Exit poll data ===
2024 presidential election in Texas voter demographics
Demographic subgroup	Trump	Harris	% of total vote
Ideology
Liberals	12	87	18
Moderates	37	62	38
Conservatives	92	8	44
Party
Democrats	4	95	26
Republicans	97	3	38
Independents	49	48	36
Gender
Men	63	35	48
Women	50	49	52
Race/ethnicity
White	66	33	55
Black	12	86	11
Latino	55	45	26
Asian	55	42	4
Gender by race/ethnicity
White men	70	27	25
White women	62	37	30
Black men	22	77	5
Black women	4	94	6
Latino men	65	35	14
Latina women	41	58	12
All other races	58	40	8
White evangelical or born again Christian
Yes	86	13	23
No	46	53	77
Age
18–29 years old	48	50	14
30–44 years old	55	44	24
45–64 years old	58	41	37
65 and older	59	40	26
First time voter
Yes	77	23	9
No	54	44	91
Education
No college degree	61	38	58
College graduate	49	49	42
Education by race
White college graduates	57	41	27
White no college degree	74	25	29
Non-White college graduates	37	62	16
Non-White no college degree	48	51	29
Military service
Veterans	65	34	18
Non-veterans	54	44	82
Area type
Urban	46	52	42
Suburban	62	37	49
Rural	72	25	9
Biden job approval
Strongly disapprove	98	1	52
Somewhat disapprove	35	60	12
Somewhat approve	4	95	21
Strongly approve	1	99	15
Feeling about the way things are going in U.S.
Dissatisfied	50	48	40
Angry	86	13	37
Satisfied	15	85	15
Enthusiastic	n/a	n/a	8
Quality of candidate that mattered most
Has ability to lead	70	29	29
Can bring needed change	69	29	29
Has good judgment	33	65	23
Cares about people like me	43	57	17
Vote for president mainly
For your candidate	59	40	79
Against their opponent	46	52	20
Issue regarded as most important
Democracy	23	75	31
Economy	87	12	35
Abortion	9	91	14
Immigration	91	9	14
Foreign policy	n/a	n/a	5
Democracy threatened in the United States
Democracy in the U.S. very threatened	60	38	41
Democracy in the U.S. somewhat threatened	59	40	32
Democracy in the U.S. somewhat secure	46	53	22
Democracy in the U.S. very secure	n/a	n/a	4
Confident election being conducted fairly and accurately
Very confident	30	68	34
Somewhat confident	68	31	47
Not very confident	56	40	14
Not at all confident	n/a	n/a	4
Condition of the nation's economy
Not so good	55	44	32
Poor	94	5	39
Good	6	93	25
Excellent	n/a	n/a	4
Family's financial situation today
Worse than four years ago	84	15	53
About the same	33	65	27
Better than four years ago	12	86	20
Abortion should be
Legal in all cases	10	89	23
Legal in most cases	43	54	35
Illegal in most cases	95	5	31
Illegal in all cases	n/a	n/a	8
Most undocumented immigrants in the U.S. should be
Offered chance at legal status	21	76	50
Deported	92	7	48

== See also ==
- United States presidential elections in Texas
- 2024 Democratic Party presidential primaries
- 2024 Republican Party presidential primaries
- 2024 Texas elections
- 2024 United States elections
