= Texas's 1st congressional district =

U.S. House district for Texas

Coordinates: 31°57′06″N 94°33′07″W

- Interactive map of district boundaries
- Representative: Nathaniel Moran; R–Whitehouse
- Distribution: 56.8% urban; 43.4% rural
- Population (2025): 805,430
- Median household income: $67,814
- Ethnicity: 60.0% White; 17.5% Black; 17.0% Hispanic; 3.7% Two or more races; 1.2% Asian; 0.7% other
- Cook PVI: R+25

Texas' 1st congressional district in the United States House of Representatives serves the northeastern portion of the state of Texas. As of 2022, the 1st district contained 775,992 people. It consists largely of four small East Texas metropolitan areas—Kilgore, Texarkana, Longview–Marshall, and Tyler. With a Cook Partisan Voting Index rating of R+25, it is one of the most Republican districts in Texas. It has been represented by Republican Nathaniel Moran since 2023.

The 1st district once encompassed large parts of North Texas and Central Texas, but as the population of Texas grew, the district got smaller until it only encompassed about half of Northeast Texas.

For most of its history, the district was based in Texarkana, but in a controversial 2003 redistricting orchestrated by then-House Majority Leader Tom DeLay, Texarkana was drawn out of the district and moved to the neighboring 4th district. Lufkin, Tyler and Longview were added in its place. In the 2021 redistricting, Lufkin was dropped from the district and Texarkana was added back into it.

The district was predominantly rural for much of its history, and thus was far friendlier to electing Democrats to Congress even as most of Texas swung toward the Republicans. The district's four-term Democratic incumbent, Max Sandlin, was a particularly severe critic of the DeLay-led redistricting effort, claiming that lumping rural areas with urban ones stifled the voice of rural voters. The 2003 redistricting made the district more urban and Republican, especially with the addition of the Republican strongholds of Tyler and Longview. Sandlin was easily defeated in November 2004 by Republican Louie Gohmert, a longtime judge in the Tyler area. Gohmert was the first Republican to represent the district since Reconstruction. Proving just how Republican the reconfigured district is, Gohmert was reelected seven times with no less than 68 percent of the vote. The Democrats chose to not put up a candidate in 2008 and 2012. In 2022, Moran was elected to succeed Gohmert, with nearly 80% of the vote, becoming only the second Republican to represent the district since Reconstruction. In 2024, Moran ran unopposed.

The district's best-known congressman, Wright Patman, represented the district for 47 years—the second-longest tenure of any Texan in Congress. He was an early supporter of the New Deal, and later chaired the House Banking Committee for 12 years.

== 2012 redistricting ==
The 2012 redistricting process changed the district's northern section. All of Marion County, Cass County, and most of Upshur County were removed from the district. To compensate, the eastern half of Wood County was added. Prior to this, the district included a population of 651,619 in the 2000 census. Additionally, the population broke down accordingly:

- Under 18: 26.2%
- Over 65: 14.1%
- Married 58.7%
- Non-Hispanic White: 71%
- Black: 18%
- Hispanic: 9%
- Asian: 1%
- Foreign born: 5.3%
- Language other than English: 9.8%
- Median household income: $33,461
- Owner-occupied housing: 71.9%
- Income above $200K: 1.4%

== Recent election results from statewide races ==
=== 2023–2027 boundaries ===
Year	Office	Results
2008	President	McCain 69–30%
2012	President	Romney 72–28%
2014	Senate	Cornyn 78–22%
2014	Governor	Abbott 76–24%
2016	President	Trump 72–25%
2018	Senate	Cruz 73–27%
2018	Governor	Abbott 75–24%
2018	Lt. Governor	Patrick 70–28%
2018	Attorney General	Paxton 71–27%
2018	Comptroller of Public Accounts	Hegar 73–25%
2020	President	Trump 72–26%
2020	Senate	Cornyn 73–26%
2022	Governor	Abbott 77–22%
2022	Lt. Governor	Patrick 76–22%
2022	Attorney General	Paxton 76–22%
2022	Comptroller of Public Accounts	Hegar 77–21%
2024	President	Trump 75–24%
2024	Senate	Cruz 73–25%

=== 2027–2033 boundaries ===
Year	Office	Results
2008	President	McCain 68–31%
2012	President	Romney 72–28%
2014	Senate	Cornyn 78–22%
2014	Governor	Abbott 76–24%
2016	President	Trump 72–25%
2018	Senate	Cruz 71–28%
2018	Governor	Abbott 74–25%
2018	Lt. Governor	Patrick 69–29%
2018	Attorney General	Paxton 71–28%
2018	Comptroller of Public Accounts	Hegar 72–26%
2020	President	Trump 71–28%
2020	Senate	Cornyn 72–27%
2022	Governor	Abbott 76–23%
2022	Lt. Governor	Patrick 75–23%
2022	Attorney General	Paxton 75–23%
2022	Comptroller of Public Accounts	Hegar 77–22%
2024	President	Trump 74–25%
2024	Senate	Cruz 73–26%
2026	Senate	Paxton 63-33%
2026	Governor	Abbott 66-32%

== Current composition ==
For the 118th and successive Congresses (based on redistricting following the 2020 census), the district contains all or portions of the following counties and communities:

Bowie County (8)

De Kalb, Maud, Nash, New Boston, Red Lick, Redwater, Texarkana, Wake Village

Camp County (2)

Pittsburg, Rocky Mound

Cass County (11)

All 11 communities

Franklin County (2)

Mount Vernon, Winnsboro

Gregg County (11)

All 11 communities

Harrison County (6)

All 6 communities

Marion County (2)

Jefferson, Pine Harbor

Morris County (5)

All 5 communities

Panola County (4)

All 4 communities

Red River County (6)

All 6 communities

Rusk County (9)

All 9 communities

Sabine County (3)

All 3 communities

San Augustine County (2)

Broaddus, San Augustine

Shelby County (6)

All 6 communities

Smith County (12)

All 12 communities

Titus County (4)

All 4 communities

Upshur County (6)

Big Sandy, East Mountain, Gilmer, Gladewater (shared with Gregg County), Union Grove, Warren City (shared with Gregg County)

== Future composition ==
Beginning with the 2026 election, the 1st district will consist of the following counties:

- Bowie (part)
- Cass
- Cherokee
- Gregg
- Harrison
- Marion
- Nacogdoches
- Panola
- Rusk
- Sabine
- San Augustine
- Shelby
- Smith

== List of members representing the district ==
Representative	Party	Years	Cong ress	Electoral history	Counties represented
District established December 29, 1845
Vacant		December 29, 1845 – March 30, 1846	29th		1845–1851; Lamar, Red River, Bowie, Fannin, Nacogdoches, Rusk, Harrison, Shelby, Houston, San Augustine, Liberty, Jasper, Jefferson
David S. Kaufman (Sabine)	Democratic	March 30, 1846 – January 31, 1851	29th 30th 31st	Elected in 1846. Re-elected November 2, 1846. Re-elected late August 6, 1849. Died.	1845–1851; Lamar, Red River, Bowie, Fannin, Nacogdoches, Rusk, Harrison, Shelby, Houston, San Augustine, Liberty, Jasper, Jefferson
Vacant		January 31, 1851 – March 4, 1851	31st		1845–1851; Lamar, Red River, Bowie, Fannin, Nacogdoches, Rusk, Harrison, Shelby, Houston, San Augustine, Liberty, Jasper, Jefferson
Richardson A. Scurry (Clarksville)	Democratic	March 4, 1851 – March 3, 1853	32nd	Re-elected late August 4, 1851.	1851–1861; Cooke, Fannin, Grayson, Lamar, Red River, Bowie, Denton, Collin, Hunt, Hopkins, Titus, Cass, Dallas, Kaufman, Van Zandt, Wood, Upshur, Harrison, Henderson, Smith, Rusk, Panola, Anderson, Cherokee, Nacogdoches, Shelby, Houston, Angelina, San Augustine, Sabine, Trinity, Polk, Tyler, Jasper, Newton, Liberty, Jefferson
George W. Smyth (Jasper)	Democratic	March 4, 1853 – March 3, 1855	33rd	Elected late August 1, 1853. Retired.	1851–1861; Cooke, Fannin, Grayson, Lamar, Red River, Bowie, Denton, Collin, Hunt, Hopkins, Titus, Cass, Dallas, Kaufman, Van Zandt, Wood, Upshur, Harrison, Henderson, Smith, Rusk, Panola, Anderson, Cherokee, Nacogdoches, Shelby, Houston, Angelina, San Augustine, Sabine, Trinity, Polk, Tyler, Jasper, Newton, Liberty, Jefferson
Lemuel D. Evans (Marshall)	Know Nothing	March 4, 1855 – March 3, 1857	34th	Re-elected late August 6, 1855. [data missing]	1851–1861; Cooke, Fannin, Grayson, Lamar, Red River, Bowie, Denton, Collin, Hunt, Hopkins, Titus, Cass, Dallas, Kaufman, Van Zandt, Wood, Upshur, Harrison, Henderson, Smith, Rusk, Panola, Anderson, Cherokee, Nacogdoches, Shelby, Houston, Angelina, San Augustine, Sabine, Trinity, Polk, Tyler, Jasper, Newton, Liberty, Jefferson
John H. Reagan (Palestine)	Democratic	March 4, 1857 – March 3, 1861	35th 36th	Elected late August 3, 1857. Re-elected late August 1, 1859. Left Congress for state's secession.	1851–1861; Cooke, Fannin, Grayson, Lamar, Red River, Bowie, Denton, Collin, Hunt, Hopkins, Titus, Cass, Dallas, Kaufman, Van Zandt, Wood, Upshur, Harrison, Henderson, Smith, Rusk, Panola, Anderson, Cherokee, Nacogdoches, Shelby, Houston, Angelina, San Augustine, Sabine, Trinity, Polk, Tyler, Jasper, Newton, Liberty, Jefferson
District inactive		March 3, 1861 – March 30, 1870	37th 38th 39th 40th 41st	Civil War and Reconstruction	
George W. Whitmore (Tyler)	Republican	March 30, 1870 – March 3, 1871	41st	Elected to finish vacant term. Lost re-election.	1870–1873; Wood, Harrison, Van Zandt, Smith, Rusk, Panola, Henderson, Anderson, Cherokee, Nacogdoches, Shelby, Houston, Angelina, San Augustine, Sabine, Trinity, Polk, Tyler, Jasper, Newton, Liberty, Hardin, Orange, Chambers, Jefferson
William S. Herndon (Tyler)	Democratic	March 4, 1871 – March 3, 1875	42nd 43rd	Elected late October 6, 1871. Re-elected in 1872. [data missing]	1870–1873; Wood, Harrison, Van Zandt, Smith, Rusk, Panola, Henderson, Anderson, Cherokee, Nacogdoches, Shelby, Houston, Angelina, San Augustine, Sabine, Trinity, Polk, Tyler, Jasper, Newton, Liberty, Hardin, Orange, Chambers, Jefferson
William S. Herndon (Tyler)	Democratic	March 4, 1871 – March 3, 1875	42nd 43rd	Elected late October 6, 1871. Re-elected in 1872. [data missing]	1873–1875; Smith, Rusk, Panola, Henderson, Anderson, Cherokee, Nacogdoches, Shelby, Houston, Angelina, San Augustine, Sabine, Trinity, Polk, Tyler, Jasper, Newton, Liberty, Hardin, Orange, Chambers, Jefferson
John H. Reagan (Palestine)	Democratic	March 4, 1875 – March 3, 1883	44th 45th 46th 47th	Elected in 1874. Re-elected in 1876. Re-elected in 1878. Re-elected in 1880. Redistricted to the 2nd district.	1875–1883; Wood, Harrison, Van Zandt, Smith, Rusk, Panola, Henderson, Anderson, Cherokee, Nacogdoches, Shelby, Houston, Angelina, San Augustine, Sabine, Trinity, Polk, Tyler, Jasper
Charles Stewart (Houston)	Democratic	March 4, 1883 – March 3, 1893	48th 49th 50th 51st 52nd	Elected in 1882. Re-elected in 1884. Re-elected in 1886. Re-elected in 1888. Re-elected in 1890. [data missing]	1883–1893; Angelina, Trinity, Madison, Brazos, Grimes, Waller, Montgomery, Harris, Polk, San Jacinto, Liberty, Chambers, Jefferson, Orange, Tyler, Jasper, Newton
Joseph C. Hutcheson (Houston)	Democratic	March 4, 1893 – March 3, 1897	53rd 54th	Elected in 1892. Re-elected in 1894. [data missing]	1893–1897; Freestone, Leon, Trinity, Madison, Walker, Grimes, Montgomery, Waller, Harris, Chambers
Thomas H. Ball (Huntsville)	Democratic	March 4, 1897 – March 3, 1903	55th 56th 57th	Elected in 1896. Re-elected in 1898. Re-elected in 1900. [data missing]	1897–1903; Freestone, Leon, Trinity, Madison, Walker, Grimes, Montgomery, Waller, Harris, Chambers
Morris Sheppard (Texarkana)	Democratic	March 4, 1903 – February 3, 1913	58th 59th 60th 61st 62nd	Redistricted from the 4th district and re-elected in 1902. Re-elected in 1904. Re-elected in 1906. Re-elected in 1908. Re-elected in 1910. Resigned after election as U.S. Senator.	1903–1913; Lamar, Red River, Bowie, Delta, Hopkins, Franklin, Titus, Camp, Morris, Cass, Marion
Vacant		February 3, 1913 – March 4, 1913	63rd		1903–1913; Lamar, Red River, Bowie, Delta, Hopkins, Franklin, Titus, Camp, Morris, Cass, Marion
Horace W. Vaughan (Texarkana)	Democratic	March 4, 1913 – March 3, 1915	63rd	Elected in 1912. [data missing]	1913–1915; Lamar, Red River, Bowie, Delta, Hopkins, Franklin, Titus, Camp, Morris, Cass, Marion
Eugene Black (Clarksville)	Democratic	March 4, 1915 – March 3, 1929	64th 65th 66th 67th 68th 69th 70th	Elected in 1914. Re-elected in 1916. Re-elected in 1918. Re-elected in 1920. Re-elected in 1922. Re-elected in 1924. Re-elected in 1926. [data missing]	1915–1923; Lamar, Red River, Bowie, Delta, Hopkins, Franklin, Titus, Camp, Morris, Cass, Marion
Eugene Black (Clarksville)	Democratic	March 4, 1915 – March 3, 1929	64th 65th 66th 67th 68th 69th 70th	Elected in 1914. Re-elected in 1916. Re-elected in 1918. Re-elected in 1920. Re-elected in 1922. Re-elected in 1924. Re-elected in 1926. [data missing]	1923–1933; Lamar, Red River, Bowie, Delta, Hopkins, Franklin, Titus, Camp, Morris, Cass, Marion
Wright Patman (Texarkana)	Democratic	March 4, 1929 – March 7, 1976	71st 72nd 73rd 74th 75th 76th 77th 78th 79th 80th 81st 82nd 83rd 84th 85th 86th 87th 88th 89th 90th 91st 92nd 93rd 94th	Elected in 1928. Re-elected in 1930. Re-elected in 1932. Re-elected in 1934. Re-elected in 1936. Re-elected in 1938. Re-elected in 1940. Re-elected in 1942. Re-elected in 1944. Re-elected in 1946. Re-elected in 1948. Re-elected in 1950. Re-elected in 1952. Re-elected in 1954. Re-elected in 1956. Re-elected in 1958. Re-elected in 1960. Re-elected in 1962. Re-elected in 1964. Re-elected in 1966. Re-elected in 1968. Re-elected in 1970. Re-elected in 1972. Re-elected in 1974. Died.	1923–1933; Lamar, Red River, Bowie, Delta, Hopkins, Franklin, Titus, Camp, Morris, Cass, Marion
Wright Patman (Texarkana)	Democratic	March 4, 1929 – March 7, 1976	71st 72nd 73rd 74th 75th 76th 77th 78th 79th 80th 81st 82nd 83rd 84th 85th 86th 87th 88th 89th 90th 91st 92nd 93rd 94th	Elected in 1928. Re-elected in 1930. Re-elected in 1932. Re-elected in 1934. Re-elected in 1936. Re-elected in 1938. Re-elected in 1940. Re-elected in 1942. Re-elected in 1944. Re-elected in 1946. Re-elected in 1948. Re-elected in 1950. Re-elected in 1952. Re-elected in 1954. Re-elected in 1956. Re-elected in 1958. Re-elected in 1960. Re-elected in 1962. Re-elected in 1964. Re-elected in 1966. Re-elected in 1968. Re-elected in 1970. Re-elected in 1972. Re-elected in 1974. Died.	1933–1943; Lamar, Red River, Bowie, Delta, Hopkins, Franklin, Titus, Camp, Morris, Cass, Marion, Harrison
Wright Patman (Texarkana)	Democratic	March 4, 1929 – March 7, 1976	71st 72nd 73rd 74th 75th 76th 77th 78th 79th 80th 81st 82nd 83rd 84th 85th 86th 87th 88th 89th 90th 91st 92nd 93rd 94th	Elected in 1928. Re-elected in 1930. Re-elected in 1932. Re-elected in 1934. Re-elected in 1936. Re-elected in 1938. Re-elected in 1940. Re-elected in 1942. Re-elected in 1944. Re-elected in 1946. Re-elected in 1948. Re-elected in 1950. Re-elected in 1952. Re-elected in 1954. Re-elected in 1956. Re-elected in 1958. Re-elected in 1960. Re-elected in 1962. Re-elected in 1964. Re-elected in 1966. Re-elected in 1968. Re-elected in 1970. Re-elected in 1972. Re-elected in 1974. Died.	1943–1953; Lamar, Red River, Bowie, Delta, Hopkins, Franklin, Titus, Camp, Morris, Cass, Marion, Harrison
Wright Patman (Texarkana)	Democratic	March 4, 1929 – March 7, 1976	71st 72nd 73rd 74th 75th 76th 77th 78th 79th 80th 81st 82nd 83rd 84th 85th 86th 87th 88th 89th 90th 91st 92nd 93rd 94th	Elected in 1928. Re-elected in 1930. Re-elected in 1932. Re-elected in 1934. Re-elected in 1936. Re-elected in 1938. Re-elected in 1940. Re-elected in 1942. Re-elected in 1944. Re-elected in 1946. Re-elected in 1948. Re-elected in 1950. Re-elected in 1952. Re-elected in 1954. Re-elected in 1956. Re-elected in 1958. Re-elected in 1960. Re-elected in 1962. Re-elected in 1964. Re-elected in 1966. Re-elected in 1968. Re-elected in 1970. Re-elected in 1972. Re-elected in 1974. Died.	1953–1959; Lamar, Red River, Bowie, Delta, Hopkins, Franklin, Titus, Camp, Morris, Cass, Marion, Harrison
Wright Patman (Texarkana)	Democratic	March 4, 1929 – March 7, 1976	71st 72nd 73rd 74th 75th 76th 77th 78th 79th 80th 81st 82nd 83rd 84th 85th 86th 87th 88th 89th 90th 91st 92nd 93rd 94th	Elected in 1928. Re-elected in 1930. Re-elected in 1932. Re-elected in 1934. Re-elected in 1936. Re-elected in 1938. Re-elected in 1940. Re-elected in 1942. Re-elected in 1944. Re-elected in 1946. Re-elected in 1948. Re-elected in 1950. Re-elected in 1952. Re-elected in 1954. Re-elected in 1956. Re-elected in 1958. Re-elected in 1960. Re-elected in 1962. Re-elected in 1964. Re-elected in 1966. Re-elected in 1968. Re-elected in 1970. Re-elected in 1972. Re-elected in 1974. Died.	1959–1963; Lamar, Red River, Bowie, Delta, Hopkins, Franklin, Titus, Morris, Cass, Marion, Harrison
Wright Patman (Texarkana)	Democratic	March 4, 1929 – March 7, 1976	71st 72nd 73rd 74th 75th 76th 77th 78th 79th 80th 81st 82nd 83rd 84th 85th 86th 87th 88th 89th 90th 91st 92nd 93rd 94th	Elected in 1928. Re-elected in 1930. Re-elected in 1932. Re-elected in 1934. Re-elected in 1936. Re-elected in 1938. Re-elected in 1940. Re-elected in 1942. Re-elected in 1944. Re-elected in 1946. Re-elected in 1948. Re-elected in 1950. Re-elected in 1952. Re-elected in 1954. Re-elected in 1956. Re-elected in 1958. Re-elected in 1960. Re-elected in 1962. Re-elected in 1964. Re-elected in 1966. Re-elected in 1968. Re-elected in 1970. Re-elected in 1972. Re-elected in 1974. Died.	1963–1967; Lamar, Red River, Bowie, Delta, Hopkins, Franklin, Titus, Morris, Cass, Marion, Harrison
Wright Patman (Texarkana)	Democratic	March 4, 1929 – March 7, 1976	71st 72nd 73rd 74th 75th 76th 77th 78th 79th 80th 81st 82nd 83rd 84th 85th 86th 87th 88th 89th 90th 91st 92nd 93rd 94th	Elected in 1928. Re-elected in 1930. Re-elected in 1932. Re-elected in 1934. Re-elected in 1936. Re-elected in 1938. Re-elected in 1940. Re-elected in 1942. Re-elected in 1944. Re-elected in 1946. Re-elected in 1948. Re-elected in 1950. Re-elected in 1952. Re-elected in 1954. Re-elected in 1956. Re-elected in 1958. Re-elected in 1960. Re-elected in 1962. Re-elected in 1964. Re-elected in 1966. Re-elected in 1968. Re-elected in 1970. Re-elected in 1972. Re-elected in 1974. Died.	1967–1969; Lamar, Red River, Bowie, Delta, Hopkins, Wood, Franklin, Titus, Camp, Morris, Cass, Marion, Harrison, Panola, Rusk, Cherokee, Shelby
Wright Patman (Texarkana)	Democratic	March 4, 1929 – March 7, 1976	71st 72nd 73rd 74th 75th 76th 77th 78th 79th 80th 81st 82nd 83rd 84th 85th 86th 87th 88th 89th 90th 91st 92nd 93rd 94th	Elected in 1928. Re-elected in 1930. Re-elected in 1932. Re-elected in 1934. Re-elected in 1936. Re-elected in 1938. Re-elected in 1940. Re-elected in 1942. Re-elected in 1944. Re-elected in 1946. Re-elected in 1948. Re-elected in 1950. Re-elected in 1952. Re-elected in 1954. Re-elected in 1956. Re-elected in 1958. Re-elected in 1960. Re-elected in 1962. Re-elected in 1964. Re-elected in 1966. Re-elected in 1968. Re-elected in 1970. Re-elected in 1972. Re-elected in 1974. Died.	1969–1973; Lamar, Red River, Bowie, Delta, Hopkins, Wood, Franklin, Titus, Camp, Morris, Cass, Marion, Harrison, Panola, Rusk, Cherokee, Upshur, Shelby
Wright Patman (Texarkana)	Democratic	March 4, 1929 – March 7, 1976	71st 72nd 73rd 74th 75th 76th 77th 78th 79th 80th 81st 82nd 83rd 84th 85th 86th 87th 88th 89th 90th 91st 92nd 93rd 94th	Elected in 1928. Re-elected in 1930. Re-elected in 1932. Re-elected in 1934. Re-elected in 1936. Re-elected in 1938. Re-elected in 1940. Re-elected in 1942. Re-elected in 1944. Re-elected in 1946. Re-elected in 1948. Re-elected in 1950. Re-elected in 1952. Re-elected in 1954. Re-elected in 1956. Re-elected in 1958. Re-elected in 1960. Re-elected in 1962. Re-elected in 1964. Re-elected in 1966. Re-elected in 1968. Re-elected in 1970. Re-elected in 1972. Re-elected in 1974. Died.	1973–1975; Lamar, Red River, Bowie, Delta, Hopkins, Wood, Franklin, Titus, Camp, Morris, Cass, Marion, Harrison, Panola, Rusk, Cherokee, Upshur, Shelby, Fannin, Henderson, San Augustine
Wright Patman (Texarkana)	Democratic	March 4, 1929 – March 7, 1976	71st 72nd 73rd 74th 75th 76th 77th 78th 79th 80th 81st 82nd 83rd 84th 85th 86th 87th 88th 89th 90th 91st 92nd 93rd 94th	Elected in 1928. Re-elected in 1930. Re-elected in 1932. Re-elected in 1934. Re-elected in 1936. Re-elected in 1938. Re-elected in 1940. Re-elected in 1942. Re-elected in 1944. Re-elected in 1946. Re-elected in 1948. Re-elected in 1950. Re-elected in 1952. Re-elected in 1954. Re-elected in 1956. Re-elected in 1958. Re-elected in 1960. Re-elected in 1962. Re-elected in 1964. Re-elected in 1966. Re-elected in 1968. Re-elected in 1970. Re-elected in 1972. Re-elected in 1974. Died.	1975–1977; Lamar, Red River, Bowie, Delta, Hopkins, Wood, Franklin, Titus, Camp, Morris, Cass, Marion, Harrison, Panola, Rusk, Cherokee, Upshur, Shelby, Fannin, Henderson, San Augustine, southeastern Hunt, eastern Rains
Vacant		March 7, 1976 – June 19, 1976	94th		1975–1977; Lamar, Red River, Bowie, Delta, Hopkins, Wood, Franklin, Titus, Camp, Morris, Cass, Marion, Harrison, Panola, Rusk, Cherokee, Upshur, Shelby, Fannin, Henderson, San Augustine, southeastern Hunt, eastern Rains
Sam B. Hall (Marshall)	Democratic	June 19, 1976 – May 27, 1985	94th 95th 96th 97th 98th 99th	Elected to finish Patman's term. Re-elected in 1976. Re-elected in 1978. Re-elected in 1980. Re-elected in 1982. Re-elected in 1984. Re-elected in 1978.Resigned to become U.S. District Judge.	1975–1977; Lamar, Red River, Bowie, Delta, Hopkins, Wood, Franklin, Titus, Camp, Morris, Cass, Marion, Harrison, Panola, Rusk, Cherokee, Upshur, Shelby, Fannin, Henderson, San Augustine, southeastern Hunt, eastern Rains
Sam B. Hall (Marshall)	Democratic	June 19, 1976 – May 27, 1985	94th 95th 96th 97th 98th 99th	Elected to finish Patman's term. Re-elected in 1976. Re-elected in 1978. Re-elected in 1980. Re-elected in 1982. Re-elected in 1984. Re-elected in 1978.Resigned to become U.S. District Judge.	1977–1983 [data missing]
Sam B. Hall (Marshall)	Democratic	June 19, 1976 – May 27, 1985	94th 95th 96th 97th 98th 99th	Elected to finish Patman's term. Re-elected in 1976. Re-elected in 1978. Re-elected in 1980. Re-elected in 1982. Re-elected in 1984. Re-elected in 1978.Resigned to become U.S. District Judge.	1983–1993; Lamar, Red River, Bowie, Delta, Hopkins, Wood, Franklin, Titus, Camp, Morris, Cass, Marion, Harrison, Panola, Rusk, Cherokee, Upshur, Shelby, Henderson, San Augustine, northern Hunt
Vacant		May 27, 1985 – August 3, 1985	99th		1983–1993; Lamar, Red River, Bowie, Delta, Hopkins, Wood, Franklin, Titus, Camp, Morris, Cass, Marion, Harrison, Panola, Rusk, Cherokee, Upshur, Shelby, Henderson, San Augustine, northern Hunt
Jim Chapman (Sulphur Springs)	Democratic	August 3, 1985 – January 3, 1997	99th 100th 101st 102nd 103rd 104th	Elected to finish Hall's term. Re-elected in 1986. Re-elected in 1988. Re-elected in 1990. Re-elected in 1992. Re-elected in 1994. Retired to run for U.S. Senator.	1983–1993; Lamar, Red River, Bowie, Delta, Hopkins, Wood, Franklin, Titus, Camp, Morris, Cass, Marion, Harrison, Panola, Rusk, Cherokee, Upshur, Shelby, Henderson, San Augustine, northern Hunt
Jim Chapman (Sulphur Springs)	Democratic	August 3, 1985 – January 3, 1997	99th 100th 101st 102nd 103rd 104th	Elected to finish Hall's term. Re-elected in 1986. Re-elected in 1988. Re-elected in 1990. Re-elected in 1992. Re-elected in 1994. Retired to run for U.S. Senator.	1993–1997; Lamar, Red River, Bowie, Delta, Hopkins, Wood, Franklin, Titus, Camp, Morris, Cass, Marion, Harrison, Panola, Rusk, Upshur, Shelby, eastern Hunt, southeastern Gregg, parts of Nacogdoches
Max Sandlin (Marshall)	Democratic	January 3, 1997 – January 3, 2005	105th 106th 107th 108th	Elected in 1996. Re-elected in 1998. Re-elected in 2000. Re-elected in 2002. Lost re-election.	1997–2003 [data missing]
Max Sandlin (Marshall)	Democratic	January 3, 1997 – January 3, 2005	105th 106th 107th 108th	Elected in 1996. Re-elected in 1998. Re-elected in 2000. Re-elected in 2002. Lost re-election.	2003–2005 Lamar, Red River, Bowie, Delta, Hopkins, Wood, Franklin, Titus, Camp, Morris, Cass, Marion, Harrison, Panola, Rusk, Upshur, Shelby, most of Hunt, northern Nacogdoches
Louie Gohmert (Tyler)	Republican	January 3, 2005 – January 3, 2023	109th 110th 111th 112th 113th 114th 115th 116th 117th	Elected in 2004. Re-elected in 2006. Re-elected in 2008. Re-elected in 2010. Re-elected in 2012. Re-elected in 2014. Re-elected in 2016. Re-elected in 2018. Re-elected in 2020. Retired to run for Attorney General of Texas.	2005–2013 Upshur, Marion, Harrison, Gregg, Smith, Rusk, Panola, Nacogdoches, Shelby, San Augustine, Sabine, Angelina, southeastern Cass
Louie Gohmert (Tyler)	Republican	January 3, 2005 – January 3, 2023	109th 110th 111th 112th 113th 114th 115th 116th 117th	Elected in 2004. Re-elected in 2006. Re-elected in 2008. Re-elected in 2010. Re-elected in 2012. Re-elected in 2014. Re-elected in 2016. Re-elected in 2018. Re-elected in 2020. Retired to run for Attorney General of Texas.	2013–2023 Angelina, Gregg, Harrison, Nacogdoches, Panola, Rusk, Sabine, San Augustine, Shelby, Smith, Upshur (part), Wood (part)
Nathaniel Moran (Whitehouse)	Republican	January 3, 2023 – present	118th 119th	Elected in 2022. Re-elected in 2024. Re-elected in 2026.	2023–2027 Bowie (part), Camp, Cass, Franklin, Gregg, Harrison, Marion, Morris, Panola, Red River (part), Rusk, Sabine, San Augustine, Shelby, Smith, Titus, Upshur (part)

== Recent election results ==
Election results from recent races:

=== U.S. Representative ===
2004 election
Party	Candidate	Votes	%	±%
Republican	Louie Gohmert	157,068	61.5	▲17.9
Democratic	Max Sandlin (incumbent)	96,281	37.7	▼18.7
Libertarian	Dean Tucker	2,158	0.8	
Majority		60,787	23.8	
Turnout		255,507		
Republican gain from Democratic		Swing		

2006 election
Party	Candidate	Votes	%	±%
Republican	Louie Gohmert (incumbent)	104,099	68	▲6.5
Democratic	Roger L. Owen	46,303	30.2	▼7.5
Libertarian	Donald Perkison	2,668	1.7	▼0.9
Majority		57,796	37.8	
Turnout		153,070		▼40.1
Republican hold		Swing		

2008 election
Party	Candidate	Votes	%	±%
Republican	Louie Gohmert (incumbent)	189,012	87.6	▲19.6
Independent	Roger L. Owen	26,814	12.4	
Majority		162,198	75.2	
Turnout		215,826		▲41.0
Republican hold		Swing		

2010 election
Party	Candidate	Votes	%	±%
Republican	Louie Gohmert (incumbent)	129,398	89.7	▲2.1
Libertarian	Charles F. Parkes, III	14,811	10.3	
Majority		114,587	79.6	
Turnout		144,209		▼33.2
Republican hold		Swing		

2012 election
Party	Candidate	Votes	%	±%
Republican	Louie Gohmert (incumbent)	178,322	71.4	▼18.3
Democratic	Shirley J. McKellar	67,222	26.9	
Libertarian	Clark Patterson	4,114	1.6	▼8.7
Majority		111,100	44.5	
Turnout		249,658		▲73.1
Republican hold		Swing		

2014 election
Party	Candidate	Votes	%	±%
Republican	Louie Gohmert (incumbent)	115,084	77.5	▲6.1
Democratic	Shirley J. McKellar	33,476	22.5	▼4.4
Majority		81,608	55	
Turnout		148,560		▼40.5
Republican hold		Swing		

2016 election
Party	Candidate	Votes	%	±%
Republican	Louie Gohmert (incumbent)	192,434	73.9	▼3.6
Democratic	Shirley J. McKellar	62,847	24.1	▲1.6
Libertarian	Phil Gray	5,062	1.9	
Majority		129,587	49,8	
Turnout		260,343		▲75.2
Republican hold		Swing		

2018 election
Party	Candidate	Votes	%	±%
Republican	Louie Gohmert (incumbent)	168,165	72.26	▼1.6
Democratic	Shirley J. McKellar	61,263	26.32	▲2.2
Libertarian	Jeff Callaway	3,292	0.5	
Republican hold		Swing		

2020 election
Party	Candidate	Votes	%	±%
Republican	Louie Gohmert (incumbent)	218,385	72.61	▲0.4
Democratic	Hank Gilbert	82,359	27.39	▲1.1
Republican hold		Swing		

2022 election
Party	Candidate	Votes	%	±%
Republican	Nathaniel Moran	183,224	78.08	▲5.4
Democratic	Jrmar Jefferson	51,438	21.92	▼5.4
Republican hold		Swing		

2024 election
Party	Candidate	Votes	%	±%
Republican	Nathaniel Moran (incumbent)	258,523	100.0	
Total votes		258,523	100.0	

== See also ==
- List of United States congressional districts
