= MWCD =

MWCD might refer to:

- Merriam-Webster's Collegiate Dictionary
- Ministry of Women and Child Development, India
- Muskingum Watershed Conservancy District, Ohio

== See also ==
- MWC (disambiguation)
