= Corinth, Texas (disambiguation) =

Corinth, Texas may refer to the following places in Texas:

- Corinth, Texas, a city in Denton County
- Corinth, Henderson County, Texas, a ghost town
- Corinth, Jones County, Texas, an unincorporated community
- Corinth, Lee County, Texas, an unincorporated community
- Corinth, Leon County, Texas, an unincorporated community
- Corinth, Marion County, Texas, a ghost town
- Corinth, Milam County, Texas, an unincorporated community
- Corinth, Montague County, Texas, an unincorporated community
- Corinth, Panola County, Texas, an unincorporated community
- Corinth, Van Zandt County, Texas, a ghost town
- Second Corinth, Texas
