= Corinth, Marion County, Texas =

Corinth, Texas
- Ghost town
- Location within Texas Location within the United States
- Coordinates: 32°47′50″N 94°19′34″W
- Country: United States
- State: Texas
- County: Marion
- Elevation: 197 ft (60 m)
- Area code: 903, 430

For other places in Texas named Corinth, see Corinth, Texas (disambiguation)

Corinth is a ghost town in Marion County, Texas, United States. Corinth was located at the junction of Texas State Highway 49, Farm to Market Road 248 and Farm to Market Road 1324, 3 miles (4.8 km) northeast of Jefferson. In 1936, Corinth had a church, a factory, a school, and several businesses. The school closed in 1955, and by 1962 all that was left of the community was its church and cemetery. By 1983, the church had closed and the cemetery was no longer shown on maps.
