= Marion County, Texas =

County in Texas, United States

- County
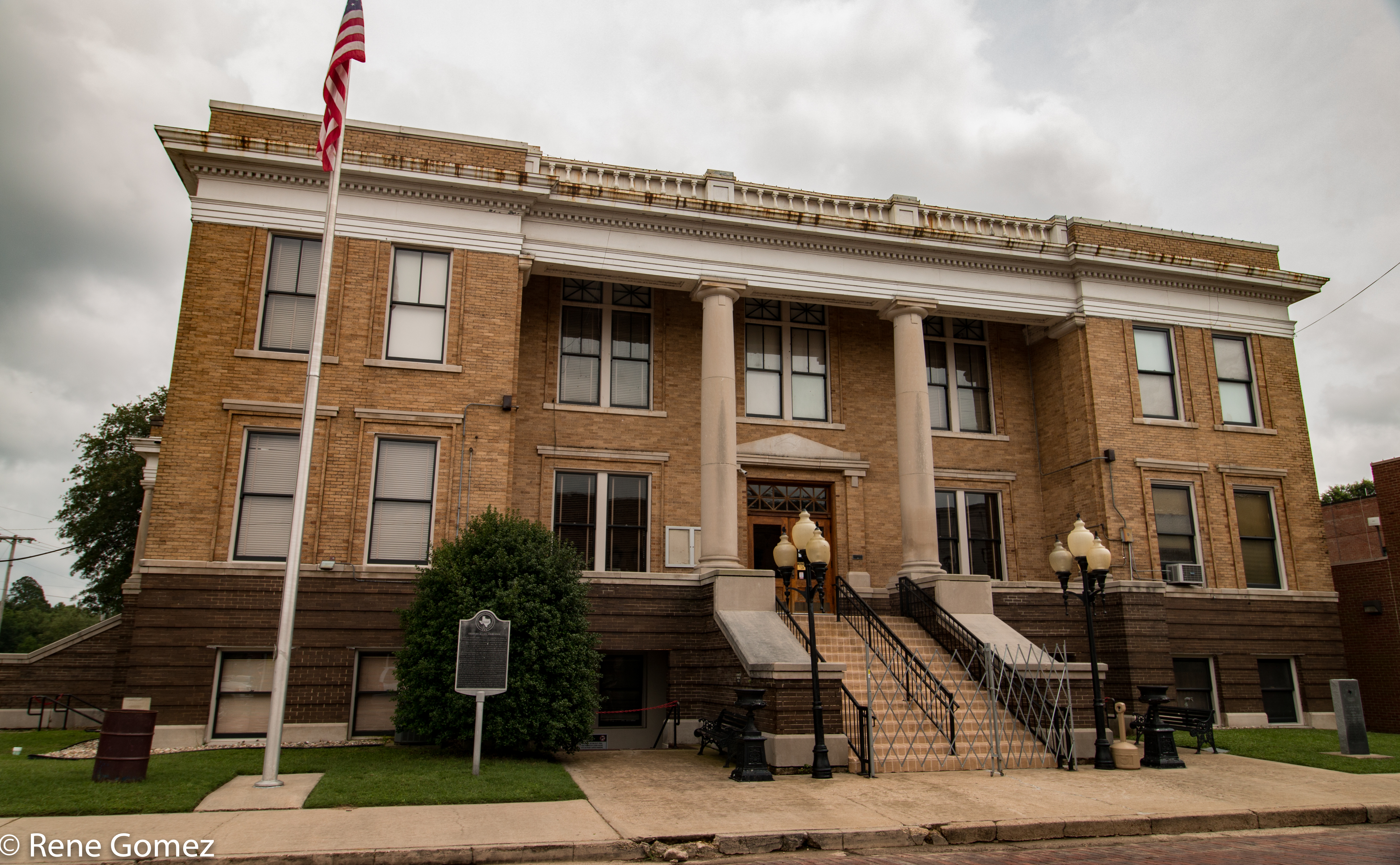
- Marion County Courthouse in Jefferson

- Location within the U.S. state of Texas
- Coordinates: 32°48′N 94°22′W
- Country: United States
- State: Texas
- Founded: 1860
- Named for: Francis Marion
- Seat: Jefferson
- Largest city: Jefferson

Area
  - Total: 420 sq mi (1,100 km^{2})
  - Land: 381 sq mi (990 km^{2})
  - Water: 39 sq mi (100 km^{2}) 9.4%

Population (2020)
  - Total: 9,725
  - Estimate (2025): 9,896 ▲
  - Density: 25.5/sq mi (9.86/km^{2})
- Time zone: UTC−6 (Central)
  - Summer (DST): UTC−5 (CDT)
- Congressional district: 1st
- Website: www.co.marion.tx.us

Marion County is a county located in the U.S. state of Texas. As of the 2020 census, its population was 9,725. Its county seat is Jefferson. Marion County is in East Texas and is named for Francis Marion, the Revolutionary War general from South Carolina who was nicknamed the "Swamp Fox".

== History ==
=== Native Americans ===
The indigenous farming Caddoan Mississippian culture has been dated to 200 BCE in the area. The Hernando de Soto expedition of 1541 resulted in violent encounters with Native Americans. Spanish and French missionaries carried endemic diseases, resulting in epidemics of smallpox, measles, malaria and influenza among the Caddo. Eventually, the Caddo were forced to reservations. Shashidahnee (Timber Hill) is the last known permanent Marion County settlement of the Caddo people. During the 19th century, Shawnee, Delaware, and Kickapoo migrated to the area and settled here.

=== County established ===
The legislature formed Marion County from Cass County in 1860 and named it for Revolutionary War Swamp Fox Francis Marion. Jefferson, named after Thomas Jefferson, became the county seat.

The majority of the settlers had migrated from other southern states and brought enslaved African Americans with them as workers, or purchased them in slave markets. The county was developed as cotton plantations, and enslaved African Americans made up 51 percent of the population in 1860. In 1861, the white male voters in the county voted unanimously for secession from the Union. The county benefited financially from Confederate government contracts.

In February 1869, the river steamboat Mittie Stephens caught fire from a torch basket that ignited a hay stack on board. Sixty-one people died, either from the fire or from being caught in the boat's paddlewheel as they jumped overboard.

Following the Civil War, the white minority used violence to impose dominance on the freedmen. On October 4, 1869, George Washington Smith, a delegate to the state Constitutional Convention, was murdered by a band of vigilantes while incarcerated in Jefferson. Smith's slaying resulted in the federal government assigning military troops to Jefferson. They offered some protection for the black majority during the Reconstruction era.

During Reconstruction, Republican presidential races were supported by the black majority voters in the county. However, with the end of Reconstruction, white conservative Democrats regained control of the state legislature and, in 1898, passed various restrictions on voter registration and voting, including establishing White primaries. Because the Democratic Party dominated the state, its primaries afforded the only true competitive political races. Blacks were unable to vote in these primaries and were thus disenfranchised. Various forms of the white primary survived until 1944, when a US Supreme Court ruling overturned the practice as racially discriminatory and unconstitutional.

The Marion County brick courthouse was erected in 1914, designed by architect Elmer George Withers. In the early 20th century, the Dick Taylor Camp of Confederate veterans erected a monument to honor the county's dead in the American Civil War, placing it outside the courthouse.

Caddo Lake State Park was first proposed in 1924. From 1933 to 1937, during the Great Depression, men were hired into the Civilian Conservation Corps and made improvements to the park. The former army barracks and mess hall were converted to log cabins and a recreation hall for park goers.

== Geography ==
According to the U.S. Census Bureau, the county has a total area of 420 square miles (1,100 km^{2}), of which 381 square miles (990 km^{2}) is land and 39 square miles (100 km^{2}) (9.4%) is water.

=== Major highways ===
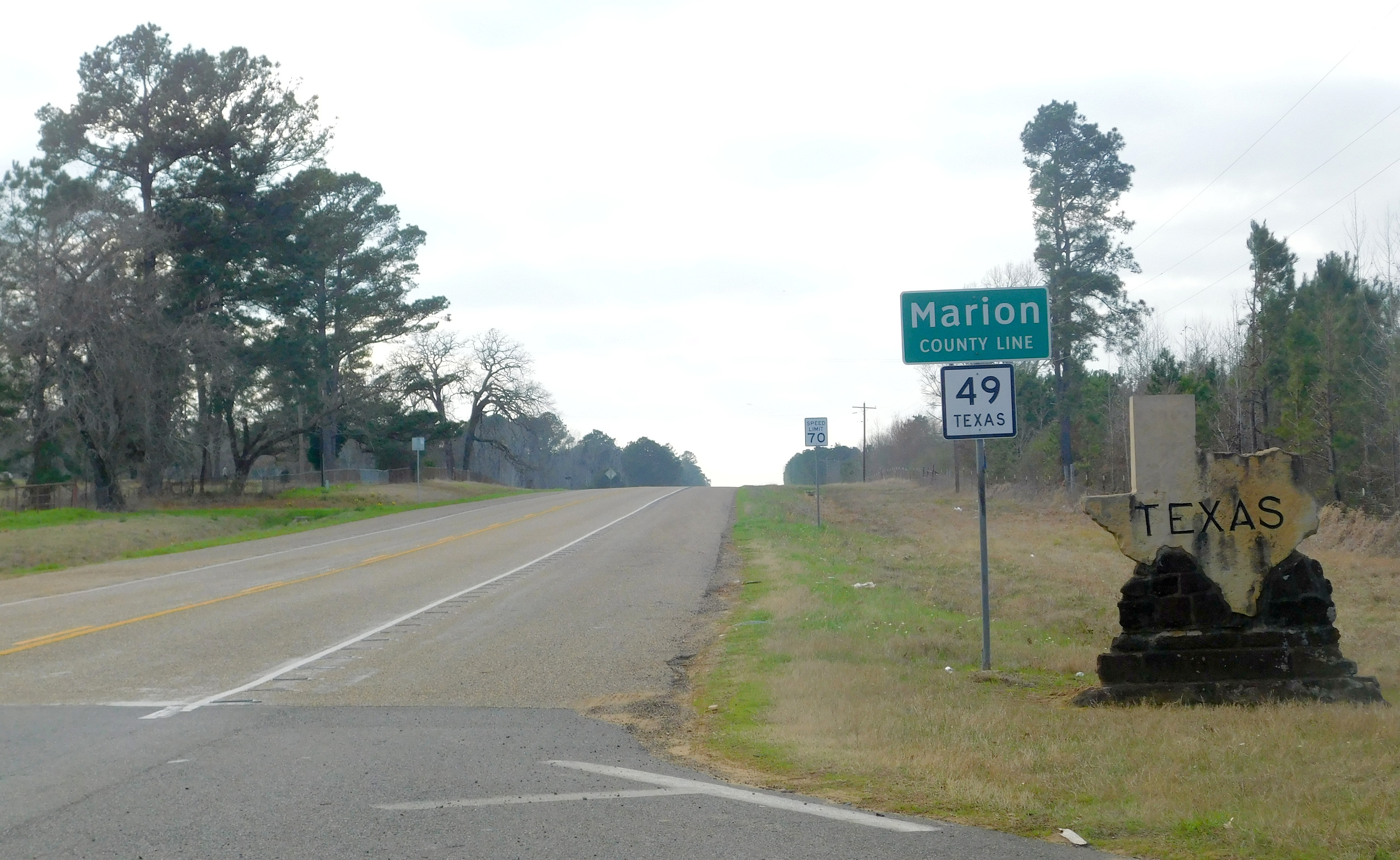
Entering Marion County from Louisiana along State Highway 49

- U.S. Highway 59
  - Interstate 369 is under construction and will follow the current route of U.S. 59 in most places.
- State Highway 43
- State Highway 49
- State Highway 155
- Farm to Market Road 134
- Farm to Market Road 248
- Farm to Market Road 2208
- Farm to Market Road 726
- Farm to Market Road 729
- Farm to Market Road 727
- Farm to Market Road 805
- Farm to Market Road 2683

The TTC-69 component (recommended preferred) of the once-planned Trans-Texas Corridor went through Marion County.

=== Adjacent counties and parishes ===
- Cass County (north)
- Caddo Parish, Louisiana (east)
- Harrison County (south)
- Upshur County (west)
- Morris County (northwest)

== Communities ==
=== City ===
- Jefferson (county seat)

=== Census-designated place ===
- Pine Harbor

=== Unincorporated communities ===
- Warlock

=== Ghost towns ===
- Corinth

== Demographics ==
Historical population
Census	Pop.	Note	%±
1860	3,977		—
1870	8,562		115.3%
1880	10,983		28.3%
1890	10,862		−1.1%
1900	10,754		−1.0%
1910	10,472		−2.6%
1920	10,886		4.0%
1930	10,371		−4.7%
1940	11,457		10.5%
1950	10,172		−11.2%
1960	8,049		−20.9%
1970	8,517		5.8%
1980	10,360		21.6%
1990	9,984		−3.6%
2000	10,941		9.6%
2010	10,546		−3.6%
2020	9,725		−7.8%
2025 (est.)	9,896	▲	1.8%
U.S. Decennial Census; 1850–2010 2010–2020

=== Racial and ethnic composition ===
Marion County, Texas – Racial and ethnic composition Note: the US Census treats Hispanic/Latino as an ethnic category. This table excludes Latinos from the racial categories and assigns them to a separate category. Hispanics/Latinos may be of any race.
Race / Ethnicity (NH = Non-Hispanic)	Pop 1980	Pop 1990	Pop 2000	Pop 2010	Pop 2020	% 1980	% 1990	% 2000	% 2010	% 2020
White alone (NH)	6,675	6,696	7,818	7,564	6,869	64.43%	67.07%	71.46%	71.72%	70.63%
Black or African American alone (NH)	3,544	3,093	2,599	2,319	1,846	34.21%	30.98%	23.75%	21.99%	18.98%
Native American or Alaska Native alone (NH)	28	40	79	72	69	0.27%	0.40%	0.72%	0.68%	0.71%
Asian alone (NH)	9	7	23	50	48	0.09%	0.07%	0.21%	0.47%	0.49%
Native Hawaiian or Pacific Islander alone (NH)	x	x	0	3	0	x	x	0.00%	0.03%	0.00%
Other race alone (NH)	5	1	3	8	45	0.05%	0.01%	0.03%	0.08%	0.46%
Mixed race or Multiracial (NH)	x	x	156	202	459	x	x	1.43%	1.92%	4.72%
Hispanic or Latino (any race)	99	147	263	328	389	0.96%	1.47%	2.40%	3.11%	4.00%
Total	10,360	9,984	10,941	10,546	9,725	100.00%	100.00%	100.00%	100.00%	100.00%

=== 2020 census ===
As of the 2020 census, the county had a population of 9,725. The median age was 52.6 years. 17.6% of residents were under the age of 18, and 27.0% of residents were 65 years of age or older. For every 100 females, there were 94.7 males, and for every 100 females age 18 and over, there were 92.9 males age 18 and over.

The racial makeup of the county was 71.7% White, 19.1% Black or African American, 0.9% American Indian and Alaska Native, 0.5% Asian, <0.1% Native Hawaiian and Pacific Islander, 1.5% from some other race, and 6.4% from two or more races. Hispanic or Latino residents of any race comprised 4.0% of the population.

<0.1% of residents lived in urban areas, while 100.0% lived in rural areas.

There were 4,336 households in the county, of which 21.3% had children under the age of 18 living in them. Of all households, 43.9% were married-couple households, 21.8% were households with a male householder and no spouse or partner present, and 29.1% were households with a female householder and no spouse or partner present. About 32.8% of all households were made up of individuals, and 16.0% had someone living alone who was 65 years of age or older.

There were 5,540 housing units, of which 21.7% were vacant. Among occupied housing units, 78.5% were owner-occupied, and 21.5% were renter-occupied. The homeowner vacancy rate was 2.3%, and the rental vacancy rate was 9.8%.

=== 2000 census ===
According to the 2000 U.S. census, there were 10,941 people, 4,610 households, and 3,120 families residing in the county. The population density was 29 people per square mile (11 people/km^{2}). There were 6,384 housing units at an average density of 17 units per square mile (6.6/km^{2}). The racial makeup of the county was 72.74% White, 23.91% Black or African American, 0.80% Native American, 0.22% Asian, 0.01% Pacific Islander, 0.79% from other races, and 1.54% from two or more races. 2.40% of the population was Hispanic or Latino of any race.

The median income for a household in the county was $25,347, and the median income for a family was $32,039. Males had a median income of $30,584 versus $17,885 for females. The per capita income for the county was $14,535. About 17.80% of families and 22.40% of the population were below the poverty line, including 29.90% of those under age 18 and 14.40% of those age 65 or over.

=== American Community Survey ===
According to the 2020 American Community Survey, the median household income was $39,093.

== Politics ==
Marion County is located within District 7 of the Texas House of Representatives. Marion County is located within District 1 of the Texas Senate.

United States presidential election results for Marion County, Texas
Year	Republican		Democratic		Third party(ies)	
Year	No.	%	No.	%	No.	%
1912	85	18.48%	339	73.70%	36	7.83%
1916	166	27.04%	445	72.48%	3	0.49%
1920	392	34.69%	430	38.05%	308	27.26%
1924	347	33.02%	620	58.99%	84	7.99%
1928	443	40.90%	640	59.10%	0	0.00%
1932	84	8.83%	861	90.54%	6	0.63%
1936	129	12.31%	919	87.69%	0	0.00%
1940	167	11.76%	1,253	88.24%	0	0.00%
1944	219	15.86%	1,057	76.54%	105	7.60%
1948	200	18.48%	703	64.97%	179	16.54%
1952	877	47.43%	970	52.46%	2	0.11%
1956	1,126	60.93%	709	38.37%	13	0.70%
1960	742	43.88%	904	53.46%	45	2.66%
1964	927	40.25%	1,372	59.57%	4	0.17%
1968	637	22.32%	1,260	44.15%	957	33.53%
1972	1,680	60.22%	1,106	39.64%	4	0.14%
1976	1,291	40.76%	1,860	58.73%	16	0.51%
1980	1,666	44.66%	2,015	54.02%	49	1.31%
1984	2,336	52.34%	2,111	47.30%	16	0.36%
1988	1,857	44.97%	2,255	54.61%	17	0.41%
1992	1,245	29.03%	2,156	50.28%	887	20.69%
1996	1,260	34.45%	2,028	55.46%	369	10.09%
2000	2,039	51.88%	1,852	47.12%	39	0.99%
2004	2,441	56.14%	1,884	43.33%	23	0.53%
2008	2,567	60.37%	1,644	38.66%	41	0.96%
2012	2,733	63.83%	1,495	34.91%	54	1.26%
2016	2,983	70.39%	1,165	27.49%	90	2.12%
2020	3,470	71.34%	1,339	27.53%	55	1.13%
2024	3,577	75.88%	1,101	23.36%	36	0.76%

United States Senate election results for Marion County, Texas1
Year	Republican		Democratic		Third party(ies)	
Year	No.	%	No.	%	No.	%
2024	3,509	74.76%	1,101	23.46%	84	1.79%

United States Senate election results for Marion County, Texas2
Year	Republican		Democratic		Third party(ies)	
Year	No.	%	No.	%	No.	%
2020	3,380	71.04%	1,276	26.82%	102	2.14%

Texas Gubernatorial election results for Marion County
Year	Republican		Democratic		Third party(ies)	
Year	No.	%	No.	%	No.	%
2022	2,557	77.44%	700	21.20%	45	1.36%

== Education ==
School districts in Marion County include:

- Avinger Independent School District
- Jefferson Independent School District
- Ore City Independent School District

All of Marion County is in the service area of Panola College.

== See also ==
- Museums in East Texas
- National Register of Historic Places listings in Marion County, Texas
- Recorded Texas Historic Landmarks in Marion County
