= MWC =

MWC or mwc may refer to:

== Organisations ==
- Manila Water Company, a Philippine water supply company
- Mark Williams Company, a software company
- Mennonite World Conference, a global community of Christian churches
- Midwest Conference, an American college athletic conference
- Mountain West Conference, another American collegiate athletic conference, commonly abbreviated as MW
- Music World Corporation, an American music publishing company

== Other uses ==
- Mobile World Congress, an annual conference and trade show for the mobile phone industry in Barcelona
- Married... with Children, an American television situation comedy
- Ma Wan Channel, a channel between Ma Wan and Tsing Yi islands in Hong Kong
- The Minnesota Wrecking Crew, a Canadian sketch comedy troupe
- Monod-Wyman-Changeux model, a biochemical model of protein transitions
- Multiply-with-carry pseudorandom number generator, an algorithm
- Oklahoma Marginal Wells Commission, a committee
- M_{wc}, a measure of an earthquake's magnitude
- MWC (astronomy) (Mount Wilson Catalogue), of class O, B, and A stars with bright hydrogen lines
- Are language, an ISO 639-3 code
- Man/Woman/Chainsaw, English rock band

== See also ==
- WMC (disambiguation)
- MWCD (disambiguation)
