= Pine Harbor, Texas =

- CDP
- Location within Texas Location within the United States
- Coordinates: 32°46′17″N 94°30′12″W
- Country: United States
- State: Texas
- County: Marion

Area
  - Total: 4.533 sq mi (11.74 km^{2})
  - Land: 3.332 sq mi (8.63 km^{2})
  - Water: 1.201 sq mi (3.11 km^{2})
- Elevation: 308 ft (94 m)

Population (2010)
  - Total: 810
  - Density: 240/sq mi (94/km^{2})
- Time zone: UTC-6 (Central (CST))
  - Summer (DST): UTC-5 (CDT)
- ZIP code: 75657
- Area code: 903, 430
- GNIS feature ID: 2586970

Pine Harbor is an unincorporated community and census-designated place in Marion County, Texas, United States. Its population was 810 as of the 2010 census. In 2020, its population was 785.

== Geography ==
According to the U.S. Census Bureau, the community has an area of 4.533 square miles (11.74 km^{2}); 3.332 square miles (8.63 km^{2}) of its area is land, and 1.201 square miles (3.11 km^{2}) is water.

== Demographics ==
Historical population
Census	Pop.	Note	%±
2010	810		—
2020	785		−3.1%
U.S. Decennial Census; 1850–1900 1910; 1920 1930 1940; 1950 1960 1970; 1980 1990 2000; 2010 2020

Pine Harbor first appeared as a census designated place in the 2010 U.S. census.

Pine Harbor CDP, Texas – Racial and ethnic composition Note: the US Census treats Hispanic/Latino as an ethnic category. This table excludes Latinos from the racial categories and assigns them to a separate category. Hispanics/Latinos may be of any race.
Race / Ethnicity (NH = Non-Hispanic)	Pop 2010	Pop 2020	% 2010	% 2020
White alone (NH)	705	650	87.04%	82.80%
Black or African American alone (NH)	21	26	2.59%	3.31%
Native American or Alaska Native alone (NH)	17	9	2.10%	1.15%
Asian alone (NH)	0	2	0.00%	0.25%
Native Hawaiian or Pacific Islander alone (NH)	0	0	0.00%	0.00%
Other race alone (NH)	5	9	0.62%	1.15%
Mixed race or Multiracial (NH)	24	32	2.96%	4.08%
Hispanic or Latino (any race)	38	57	4.69%	7.26%
Total	810	785	100.00%	100.00%

As of the 2020 United States census, there were 785 people, 266 households, and 177 families residing in the CDP.
