= Warlock, Texas =

- Unincorporated community
- Location within Texas Location within the United States
- Coordinates: 32°50′21″N 94°37′27″W
- Country: United States
- State: Texas
- County: Marion
- Elevation: 367 ft (112 m)
- Time zone: UTC-6 (Central (CST))
  - Summer (DST): UTC-5 (CDT)
- Area codes: 903, 430
- GNIS feature ID: 1379237

Warlock is an unincorporated community in Marion County, Texas, United States.
