= Warlocks Motorcycle Club =

Warlocks Motorcycle Club may refer to two different, unaffiliated outlaw motorcycle clubs:

- Warlocks Motorcycle Club (Florida), a motorcycle club based in Florida
- Warlocks Motorcycle Club (Pennsylvania), a motorcycle club based in Philadelphia, the Delaware Valley, and South Jersey

== See also ==
- Warlock (disambiguation)
