= 1892 United States presidential election in Texas =

- November 8, 1892

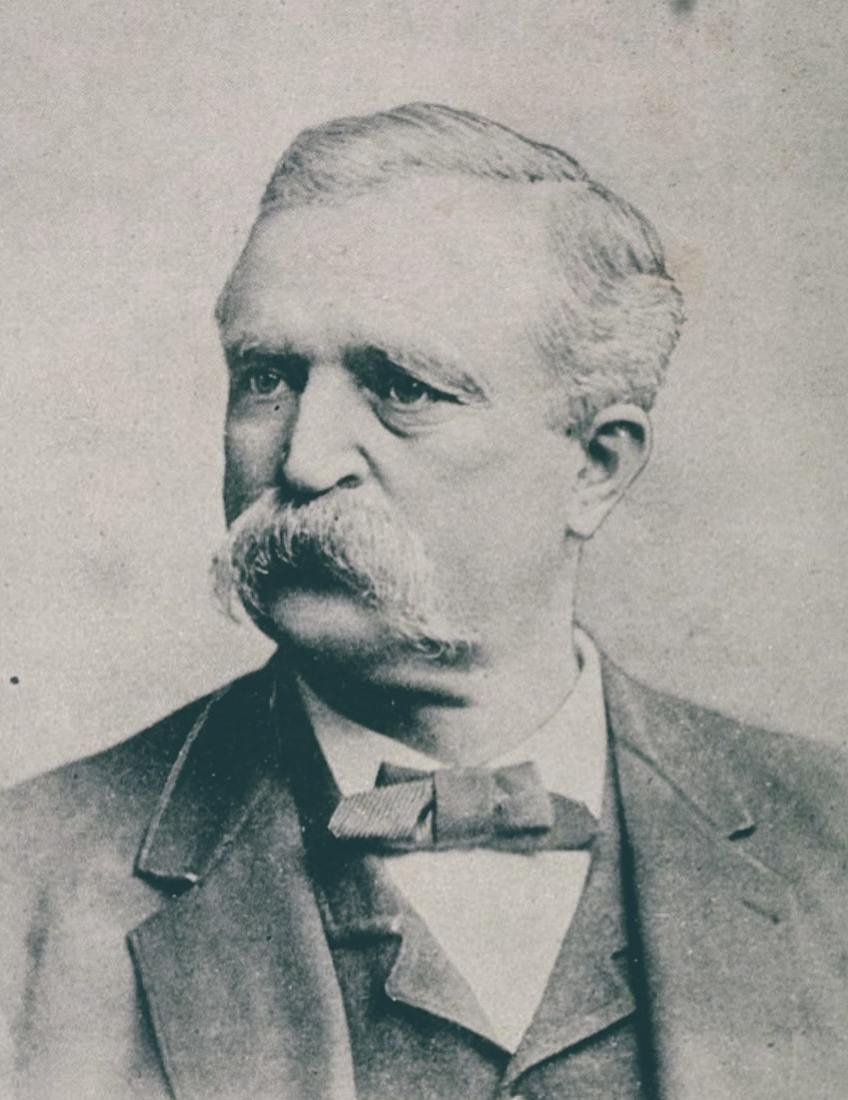

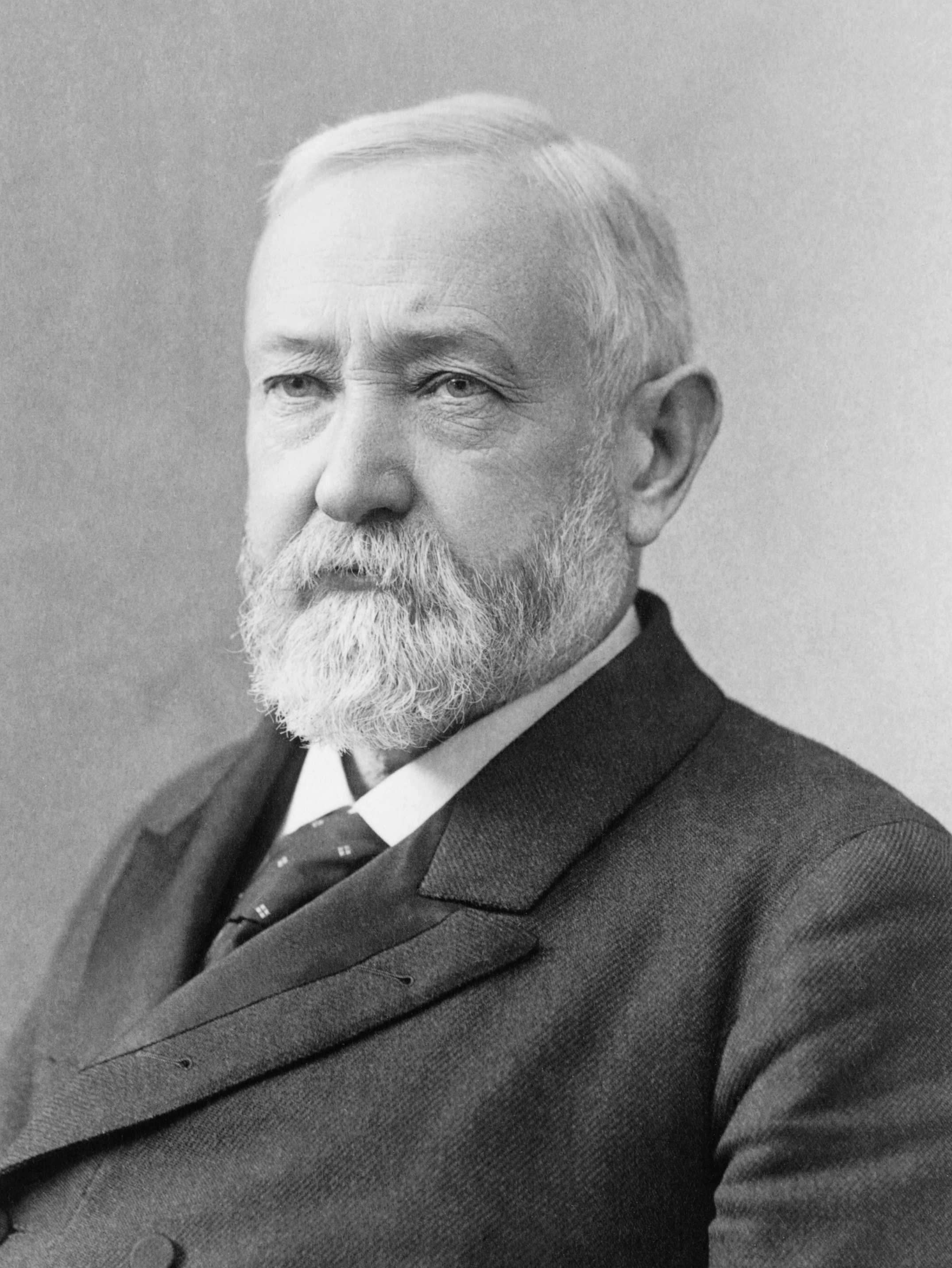
Nominee	Grover Cleveland	James B. Weaver	Benjamin Harrison
Party	Democratic	Populist	Republican
Home state	New York	Iowa	Indiana
Running mate	Adlai Stevenson I	James G. Field	Whitelaw Reid
Electoral vote	15	0	0
Popular vote	239,148	99,688	81,144
Percentage	56.65%	23.61%	19.22%
County results
Cleveland
40–50%
50–60%
60–70%
70–80%
80–90%
90–100%
Weaver
40–50%
50–60%
60–70%
90–100%
Harrison
40–50%
50–60%
60–70%
Other
No votes recorded
Unsettled areas
Unorganized territories
President before election
Benjamin Harrison
Republican
Elected President
Grover Cleveland
Democratic

The 1892 United States presidential election in Texas took place on November 8, 1892. All contemporary 44 states were part of the 1892 United States presidential election. State voters chose 15 electors to the Electoral College, which selected the president and vice president.

Texas was won by the Democratic nominees, Grover Cleveland of New York and his running mate Adlai Stevenson I of Illinois.

Although Harrison received less than 20% of the statewide vote, this was the last time Starr County voted for the Republican candidate until Donald Trump won it in 2024.

== Results ==
1892 United States presidential election in Texas
Party	Candidate	Votes	Percentage	Electoral votes
Democratic	Grover Cleveland	239,148	56.65%	15
People's	James B. Weaver	99,688	23.61%	0
Republican	Benjamin Harrison (incumbent)	81,144	19.22%	0
Prohibition	John Bidwell	2,165	0.51%	0
Totals		422,145	100.00%	15
Voter turnout				—

== See also ==
- United States presidential elections in Texas
