= Cason, Texas =

Unincorporated community in Texas, US

Coordinates: 33°02′19″N 94°48′54″W

Cason is an unincorporated community in Morris County, Texas, United States. It is located on State Highway 11, approximately five miles west of Daingerfield. The community had an estimated population of 173 in 2000. Cason has a post office, with the ZIP code 75636.

The community is located within the Daingerfield-Lone Star Independent School District.

Welsh Reservoir is located directly north-west of the community.
