= Cary Brabham =

American football player (born 1970)

No. 40
- Position: Safety

Personal information
- Born: August 11, 1970 (age 56); Longview, Texas, U.S.
- Listed height: 6 ft 0 in (1.83 m)
- Listed weight: 195 lb (88 kg)

Career information
- High school: Hughes Springs (Hughes Springs, Texas)
- College: SMU (1989–1992)
- NFL draft: 1993: undrafted
- Expansion draft: 1995: 10th round, 20th overall pick

Career history
- Los Angeles Raiders (1994); Carolina Panthers (1995)*; Green Bay Packers (1996)*
- * Offseason or practice squad member only

Career NFL statistics
- Tackles: 1
- Stats at Pro Football Reference

James Cary Brabham (born August 11, 1970) is an American former professional football player who was a safety for the Los Angeles Raiders of the National Football League (NFL) in 1994. He played college football for the SMU Mustangs. Brabham appeared on the cover of Madden NFL '96, along with Gordon Laro of the Jacksonville Jaguars.

== Early life ==
James Cary Brabham was born on August 11, 1970, in Longview, Texas. He played high school football at Hughes Springs High School in Hughes Springs, Texas, as a fullback and safety. As a senior in 1988, he rushed 311 times for 2,630 yards and 44 touchdowns as the team finished with the best record in school history (12–1–1). His 44 touchdowns were the ninth most all-time in the country. Brabham was named all-district on both offense and defense. He also earned Associated Press all-state and Texas Offensive Player of the Year honors. His No. 40 jersey was retired by Hughes Springs High in 1993.

== College career ==
Brabham played college football at Southern Methodist University, where he was a four-year letterman and four-year starter at safety for the SMU Mustangs from 1989 to 1992. He garnered All-Southwest Conference and Academic All-American recognition during his college career. Through his first three seasons, he was the Mustangs' second-leading tackler behind Bill Kiely but only had two interceptions. In October 1992, Brabham noted that he "was in position for nine interceptions last year, but I dropped all of them but one." However, his production increased during his 1992 senior season as he finished with a career-high six interceptions.

== Professional career ==
After going undrafted in the 1993 NFL draft, 10 NFL teams offered Brabham a contract. He decided to accept the Los Angeles Raiders' offer, knowing that they were thin at safety after the trade of Ronnie Lott. Brabham was the first person from Hughes Springs High School to sign an NFL contract. He played in all four preseason games for the Raiders but was released during final roster cuts before the start of the regular season. He re-signed with the Raiders on April 18, 1994. Brabham was later released again on August 28, but signed to the team's practice squad the next day. He was promoted to the active roster on November 11 and played in the final seven games of the regular season, posting four tackles on special teams and one solo tackle on defense.

On February 15, 1995, Brabham was selected by the Carolina Panthers with the 20th pick of the 1995 NFL expansion draft. He was released on August 16, 1995. Although he was little known, Brabham appeared on the cover of Madden NFL '96, tackling Gordon Laro of the Jacksonville Jaguars. They are depicted in a generic action shot of the 1995 Pro Football Hall of Fame Game, an exhibition contest which was the first game in franchise history for both expansion teams. Brabham and Laro were also wearing the same jersey number (#40). Brabham later said that he had no idea he was on the cover, stating "It was probably a year later, and I was in a store, and go, ‘Wow. Look, there I am."

Brabham signed with the Green Bay Packers in 1996. However, he later tore his groin and was released with an injury settlement on August 19, 1996. Afterward, the Raiders reportedly offered him an opportunity to play in NFL Europe but Brabham decided to retire from pro football.

== Personal life ==
Brabham later ran an online wholesaler called Jubilee Collection, which sold lights for children's rooms.
