= List of UT Arlington Mavericks in the NFL draft =

This is a list of Texas–Arlington Mavericks football players in the NFL draft.

== Key ==
B	Back	K	Kicker	NT	Nose tackle
C	Center	LB	Linebacker	FB	Fullback
DB	Defensive back	P	Punter	HB	Halfback
DE	Defensive end	QB	Quarterback	WR	Wide receiver
DT	Defensive tackle	RB	Running back	G	Guard
E	End	T	Offensive tackle	TE	Tight end

= Pro Bowler
= Hall of Famer

== Selections ==
Year	Round	Pick	Overall	Player	Team	Position
1966	16	2	232	Joe O'Brien	Los Angeles Rams	WR
1969	6	15	146	Jimmy Thomas	San Francisco 49ers	RB
1969	11	3	263	Jim Marcum	Philadelphia Eagles	DB
1969	15	8	372	Fred Gough	Detroit Lions	LB
1969	17	13	429	Vince Banonis	New York Giants	C
1970	4	18	96	Skip Bulter	Green Bay Packers	K
1970	7	1	157	Danny Griffin	Pittsburgh Steelers	RB
1970	13	26	338	Troy Patridge	Kansas City Chiefs	DE
1971	4	20	98	Don Morrison	New Orleans Saints	T
1971	16	11	401	Sid Bailey	Chicago Bears	DE
1972	5	23	127	Milt Davis	Kansas City Chiefs	DE
1974	3	13	65	Dexter Bussey	Detroit Lions	RB
1974	7	2	158	John Harvey	Los Angeles Rams	RB
1974	17	4	420	Craig Holland	Chicago Bears	QB
1976	12	1	320	Ron Barnett	Seattle Seahawks	WR
1977	12	4	311	Elmo Simmons	New York Giants	RB
1978	3	1	57	Derrick Jensen	Oakland Raiders	RB
1978	5	8	118	Dwight Carey	Kansas City Chiefs	DT
1980	3	16	72	Cliff Odom	Cleveland Browns	LB
1980	5	15	118	Roy Dewalt	Cleveland Browns	RB
1980	11	18	295	Mike Matocha	Washington Redskins	DE
1981	2	7	35	Gary Lewis	Green Bay Packers	TE
1983	5	16	128	Darryl Lewis	New England Patriots	TE
1983	10	2	253	Byron Williams	Green Bay Packers	TE
1984	8	13	209	Stacy Rayfield	Buffalo Bills	DB
1984	11	14	294	Mark Cannon	Green Bay Packers	C
1985	5	28	140	Bruce Collie	San Francisco 49ers	T
1985	8	6	202	Scott Caldwell	Green Bay Packers	RB
1986	3	9	64	Tim McKyer	San Francisco 49ers	CB
