= Jenkins, Texas =

- Unincorporated community
- Location within the state of Texas Jenkins, Texas (the United States)
- Coordinates: 32°58′34″N 94°43′07″W
- Country: United States
- State: Texas
- County: Morris
- Elevation: 285 ft (87 m)
- Time zone: UTC-6 (Central (CST))
  - Summer (DST): UTC-5 (CDT)
- Zip code: 75638
- Area codes: 903, 430
- GNIS feature ID: 1378496

Jenkins is an unincorporated community in Morris County, Texas, United States.

== History ==
Jenkins is off Ellison Creek Reservoir on U.S. Route 259, approximately five miles from Daingerfield. As of 1940 (the most recent population estimate), the population was 40. As of 1984, it had a church and a couple businesses.

== Education ==
Jenkins is served by the Daingerfield-Lone Star Independent School District.
