= Ben Young (American football) =

American football player (born 1960)

No. 86
- Position: Tight end

Personal information
- Born: January 13, 1960 (age 66); Toledo, Ohio, U.S.
- Listed height: 6 ft 2 in (1.88 m)
- Listed weight: 225 lb (102 kg)

Career information
- High school: Perry Meridian (Indianapolis, Indiana)
- College: UT Arlington
- NFL draft: 1983: undrafted

Career history
- Atlanta Falcons (1983–1984)
- Stats at Pro Football Reference

Benjamin Young (born January 13, 1960) is an American former professional football tight end who played for the Atlanta Falcons of the National Football League (NFL). He played college football at the Rose–Hulman Institute of Technology and the University of Texas at Arlington.

== Early life ==
Benjamin Young was born on January 13, 1960, in Toledo, Ohio. He attended Perry Meridian High School in Indianapolis, Indiana.

== College career ==
Young began his college football career at Division III Rose–Hulman Institute of Technology, and played one year there. He then transferred to the University of Texas at Arlington to play college football for the UT Arlington Mavericks. Young was a backup tight end to brothers Gary Lewis and Darryl Lewis while with the Mavericks. Young caught five passes for 110 yards in 1981 and 11 passes in 1982. He did not start a game while at UT Arlington.

== Professional career ==
After going undrafted in the 1983 NFL draft, Young signed with the Atlanta Falcons on May 3. He blocked well during the preseason. He split time with fellow undrafted rookie Arthur Cox during the 1983 season. Young played in 11 games, starting six, overall for the Falcons in 1983, catching six passes for 74 yards and one touchdown on 12 targets. He was placed on injured reserve on August 27, 1984, and missed the entire 1984 season. Afterwards, Young's contract ran out and he was not re-signed.
