= Keyarris Garrett =

American gridiron football player (born 1992)

Profile
- Position: Wide receiver

Personal information
- Born: September 26, 1992 (age 34); Mount Pleasant, Texas
- Listed height: 6 ft 4 in (1.93 m)
- Listed weight: 221 lb (100 kg)

Career information
- High school: Daingerfield (TX)
- College: Tulsa (2011–2015)
- NFL draft: 2016: undrafted

Career history
- Carolina Panthers (2016–2017)*; Atlanta Legends (2019)*; Baltimore Brigade (2019); Hamilton Tiger-Cats (2019)*; Los Angeles Wildcats (2020)*; Toronto Argonauts (2020–2022)
- * Offseason or practice squad member only

Awards and highlights
- FBS receiving yards leader (2015); First team All-AAC (2015); Second-team All-C-USA (2012)
- Stats at Pro Football Reference

Keyarris Garrett (born September 26, 1992) is an American former professional football wide receiver. He played college football at Tulsa, and was signed by the Carolina Panthers as an undrafted free agent in 2016. He was the leading receiver in Division I FBS football in 2015 with 1,588 receiving yards.

== College career ==
During the 2015 season, he had 96 receptions for 1,588 yards and eight touchdowns. He led all Division I players in receiving yardage for the 2015 season. On October 23, 2015, Garrett caught 14 passes for an American Athletic Conference record 268 receiving yards. In December 2015, he was a unanimous selection for the All-American Athletic Conference first-team.

For his career, Garrett had 219 receptions for 3,209 yards and 22 touchdowns.

=== Statistics ===
Year	Team	Games		Receiving				
Year	Team	GP	GS	Rec	Yds	Avg	Lng	TD
2011	Tulsa	6	0	2	10	5.0	6	0
2012	Tulsa	14	11	67	845	12.6	70	9
2013	Tulsa	2	2	7	68	9.7	20	0
2014	Tulsa	10	10	47	698	14.9	39	5
2015	Tulsa	13	13	96	1,588	16.5	50	8
Career		45	36	219	3,209	14.7	70	22

== Professional career ==
After going undrafted in the 2016 NFL draft, Garrett signed with the Carolina Panthers on May 2, 2016. On September 3, 2016, he was waived by the Panthers as part of final roster cuts and was signed to the practice squad the next day. After spending the entire season on the practice squad, Garrett signed a reserve/future contract with the Panthers on January 2, 2017.

On September 2, 2017, Garrett was waived by the Panthers and was signed to the practice squad the next day. He was released on September 15, 2017, but was re-signed a few days later. He was released on September 27, 2017.

On March 6, 2019, Garrett was assigned to the Baltimore Brigade. On March 6, 2019, Garrett was activated from the other league exempt list. He was placed on the other league exempt list again on April 5, 2019.

He signed with the Hamilton Tiger-Cats on April 15, 2019. Garrett was released on May 6, 2019.

Garrett was selected by the Los Angeles Wildcats in the 2020 XFL draft. He was waived during final roster cuts on January 22, 2020.

Garrett signed with the Toronto Argonauts of the CFL on January 28, 2020. He signed a contract extension with the team on December 31, 2020. He was placed on the suspended list on July 10, 2021. He was released on February 14, 2023.

== Personal life ==
His cousin, David Mims, played at Baylor, and was signed as an undrafted free agent by the Atlanta Falcons. His uncle, David Whitmore, also played college football at Stephen F. Austin.
