= David Mims (wide receiver) =

American football player (born 1970)

No. 34, 85
- Position: Wide receiver

Personal information
- Born: July 7, 1970 (age 56); Daingerfield, Texas, U.S.
- Listed height: 5 ft 10 in (1.78 m)
- Listed weight: 235 lb (107 kg)

Career information
- High school: Daingerfield
- College: Baylor
- NFL draft: 1993: undrafted
- Expansion draft: 1995: 30th round, 60th overall pick

Career history
- Atlanta Falcons (1993–1994); Carolina Panthers (1995)*
- * Offseason or practice squad member only

Awards and highlights
- Second-team All-SWC (1991)

Career NFL statistics
- Receptions: 15
- Receiving yards: 121
- Touchdowns: 1
- Stats at Pro Football Reference

David James Mims (born July 7, 1970) is an American former professional football player who was a wide receiver in the National Football League (NFL) for the Atlanta Falcons from 1993 to 1994. He was signed by the Falcons as an undrafted free agent in 1993. He played college football for the Baylor Bears.

Mims was selected in the 30th round (60th overall) of the 1995 NFL expansion draft by the Carolina Panthers, but was waived before the start of the 1995 season.

His cousin is Keyarris Garrett, a wide receiver for Tulsa, who went undrafted in 2016. His son, David Mims II, played cornerback for Texas State and signed as an undrafted free agent with Atlanta Falcons before being released with an injury settlement.
