= Thomas Everett =

American football player (born 1964)

No. 27, 31, 22
- Position: Safety

Personal information
- Born: November 21, 1964 (age 61); Daingerfield, Texas, U.S.
- Listed height: 5 ft 9 in (1.75 m)
- Listed weight: 185 lb (84 kg)

Career information
- High school: Daingerfield
- College: Baylor (1983–1986)
- NFL draft: 1987: 4th round, 94th overall pick

Career history
- Pittsburgh Steelers (1987–1991); Dallas Cowboys (1992–1993); Tampa Bay Buccaneers (1994–1995)

Awards and highlights
- 2× Super Bowl champion (XXVII, XXVIII); Pro Bowl (1993); PFWA All-Rookie Team (1987); Jim Thorpe Award (1986); Unanimous All-American (1986); First-team All-American (1985); SWC Athlete of the Year (1986); 2× SWC Defensive Player of the Year (1985, 1986); 2× First-team All-SWC (1985, 1986)

Career NFL statistics
- Tackles: 589
- Interceptions: 21
- Interception yards: 255
- Fumble recoveries: 11
- Sacks: 1
- Stats at Pro Football Reference
- College Football Hall of Fame

Thomas Gregory Everett (born November 21, 1964) is an American former professional football player who was a safety in the National Football League (NFL) for the Pittsburgh Steelers, Dallas Cowboys and Tampa Bay Buccaneers. He played college football for the Baylor Bears, winning the Jim Thorpe Award. He won two Super Bowls with the Cowboys.

== Early life ==
Everett was born in Daingerfield, Texas. He attended Daingerfield High School, where he started playing football as a sophomore. Although his best position was running back, he played seven positions including quarterback.

As a senior, he received All-district honors in football and basketball. He later became the first, and so far only person to have his number retired at Daingerfield High School.

== College career ==
Everett accepted a football scholarship from Baylor University, where he played under College Football Hall of Fame coach Grant Teaff. As a freshman, he began the year at running back and was named the starter at cornerback halfway through the season.

As a sophomore, he began the season at corner, but was moved to free safety in the second game, where he blossomed and collected 99 tackles.

As a junior, he became one of the best defensive backs in the nation, eventually being named a two-time All-American selection, a two-time Southwest Conference Defensive Player of the year and twice first team All-Conference. As a senior, he registered 86 tackles (7 for loss), 14 passes defensed and 6 interceptions.

As a senior in 1986, Everett became the first-ever winner of the Jim Thorpe Award as the nation's top defensive back. He was also voted the conference's Athlete of the Year.

Everett was a leader during one of the school's most successful eras as the Bears won 30 games and appeared in three bowl games. He left as the fourth all-time tackler (325) in school history. He also ranked among Baylor's top 10 in interceptions (12), punt returns (80) and punt return yards (766).

In 2006, he was elected to the College Football Hall of Fame. He was named to Baylor's All-Decade team of the 1980s and to the Baylor Athletics Hall of Fame. In 2015, he was inducted into the Southwest Conference Hall of Fame.

== Professional career ==
Pre-draft measurables
Height	Weight	Arm length	Hand span	40-yard dash	10-yard split	20-yard split	Bench press
5 ft 8 in (1.73 m)	177 lb (80 kg)	30 in (0.76 m)	9 1/2 in (0.24 m)	4.56 s	1.52 s	2.58 s	11 reps
All values from NFL Combine

=== Pittsburgh Steelers ===
The Pittsburgh Steelers selected Everett in the fourth round (94th overall) of the 1987 NFL draft. It was speculated Everett fell in the draft because he was considered too small to play safety. The Steelers drafted Everett following the departure of starting free safety Eric Williams via free agency. Everett missed the entire preseason due to a contract holdout. Head coach Chuck Noll subsequently named him the backup free safety to begin the season, behind converted cornerback Lupe Sanchez.

On November 1, 1987, Everett earned his first career start as the Steelers lost 24—35 at the Miami Dolphins, recording six solo tackles. The following week, Everett made nine combined tackles (seven solo), forced a fumble, and had his first career interception on a pass thrown by Bill Kenney to tight end Paul Coffman in the second quarter of a 17—16 win at the Kansas City Chiefs in Week 9. On November 22, 1987, Everett recorded five solo tackles and set a season-high with two interceptions on passes thrown by Boomer Esiason during a 30—16 win at the Cincinnati Bengals. In Week 14, he set a season-high with 13 combined tackles (10 solo) during a 20—16 victory at the San Diego Chargers. He completed his rookie campaign with a total of 72 combined tackles (59 solo), eight pass deflections, three interceptions, and a forced fumble in 12 games and nine starts due to the 1987 NFL player's strike.

He entered training camp slated as the starting free safety under defensive coordinator Tony Dungy and began the season alongside starting strong safety Cornell Gowdy following the retirement of Donnie Shell. On September 4, 1988, Everett started in the Pittsburgh Steelers' home-opener against the Dallas Cowboys and recorded six solo tackles, had one fumble recovery, and made his first interception of the season on a pass attempt by Steve Pelluer as they won 21—24.

He missed 2 contests with a calf and ankle injury he suffered in the second game against the Washington Redskins. He made 8 tackles and one interception in the fifth game against the Cleveland Browns. He had 8 tackles against the Phoenix Cardinals. He tallied 60 tackles, 3 interceptions, 9 passes defensed and 2 fumble recoveries.

In 1989, he started in all 16 games. He posted 81 tackles, 3 interceptions, 9 passes defensed and one fumble recovery.

In 1990, he suffered a lacerated forehead in the season opener against the Browns and did not start in the next 2 contests. He returned to the starting lineup in the fourth game against the Dolphins. He totaled 35 tackles, 3 interceptions, 5 passes defensed and 2 forced fumbles.

In 1991, he started all 16 games. He had 8 tackles in the tenth game against the Bengals. He made 2 interceptions and one forced fumble in the twelfth game against the Houston Oilers. He tallied 57 tackles, 4 interceptions (led the team), 12 passes defensed, 2 fumble recoveries and one forced fumble.

On September 19, 1992, after having missed the first two games due to a contract dispute, he was traded to the Cowboys in exchange for a fifth round draft choice (#140-Marc Woodard).

=== Dallas Cowboys ===
In 1992, he was named the starter at strong safety. In his first season with the Cowboys he wore number 31, because reserve running back Curvin Richards had the number 27, which was the one he wore for five seasons with the Steelers. When Richards was cut after the final regular season game, he changed his number to 27 for the playoffs. His first start came in the sixth game against the Kansas City Chiefs and made 8 tackles. He had 11 tackles in the eighth game against the Philadelphia Eagles. He had 2 interceptions in the ninth game against the Detroit Lions. He suffered a strained right shoulder in the eleventh game against the Detroit Lions and missed the next 2 contests. The Cowboys went on to win Super Bowl XXVII, with Everett recording 6 tackles, two interceptions, one fumble recovery and one sack in the 52–17 victory over the Buffalo Bills. He finished with 58 tackles (seventh on the team), 2 interceptions, 2 fumble recoveries and 6 passes defensed.

In 1993, he was moved to his natural free safety position, so that Darren Woodson could start at strong safety. He posted 97 tackles (third on the team), 2 interceptions, one quarterback pressure, 10 passes defensed and 10 special teams tackles, while contributing to the Cowboys winning back-to-back Super Bowls.

On April 2, 1994, because of salary cap reasons he was traded to the Tampa Bay Buccaneers in exchange for a fourth round draft choice (#109-Willie Jackson). He was replaced with James Washington. Everett was one of the most important acquisitions made during the Jimmy Johnson era, helping to solidify the team's defense along with Charles Haley.

=== Tampa Bay Buccaneers ===
In 1994, he started 15 games at free safety, making 65 tackles, one interception, 4 passes defensed, one fumble recovery and one special teams tackle. In 1995, he was limited to 13 games (10 starts) because of a knee injury, registering 60 tackles, 4 passes defensed, one fumble recovery and one sack. He was waived on March 20, 1996.

== Personal life ==
His brother Eric Everett played for the Philadelphia Eagles (1988–89), Tampa Bay Buccaneers (1990), Kansas City Chiefs (1991), and Minnesota Vikings (1992). He currently runs an athletic camp called Thomas Everett Athletics.
