= John Rodgers (American football) =

American football player (1960–1995)

No. 87, 88
- Position: Tight end

Personal information
- Born: February 7, 1960; Omaha, Texas, U.S.
- Died: January 2, 1995 (aged 34); Daingerfield, Texas, U.S.
- Listed height: 6 ft 2 in (1.88 m)
- Listed weight: 220 lb (100 kg)

Career information
- High school: Daingerfield (Daingerfield, Texas)
- College: Louisiana Tech (1978–1981)
- NFL draft: 1982: undrafted

Career history
- Pittsburgh Steelers (1982–1984)

Career NFL statistics
- Games played: 28
- Receptions: 2
- Receiving Yards: 36
- Stats at Pro Football Reference

John Darren Rodgers (February 7, 1960 – January 2, 1995) was an American professional football tight end who played for the Pittsburgh Steelers of the National Football League (NFL). He played college football at Louisiana Tech University.
