= Eric Everett =

American football player (born 1966)

No. 42, 39, 31
- Position: Cornerback

Personal information
- Born: July 13, 1966 (age 60); Daingerfield, Texas, U.S.
- Listed height: 5 ft 10 in (1.78 m)
- Listed weight: 161 lb (73 kg)

Career information
- High school: Daingerfield
- College: Texas Tech
- NFL draft: 1988: 5th round, 122nd overall pick

Career history
- Philadelphia Eagles (1988–1989); Tampa Bay Buccaneers (1990–1991); Kansas City Chiefs (1991); Minnesota Vikings (1992)

Awards and highlights
- Second-team All-SWC (1987)

Career NFL statistics
- Interceptions: 8
- Sacks: 1
- Fumble recoveries: 2
- Stats at Pro Football Reference

Eric Eugene Everett (born July 13, 1966) is an American former professional football player who was a cornerback in the National Football League (NFL). He played college football for the Texas Tech Red Raiders and was selected in the fifth round of the 1988 NFL draft. Everett played five seasons with the Philadelphia Eagles, Tampa Bay Buccaneers, Kansas City Chiefs, and Minnesota Vikings.

Everett later became a physical education coach at DeWitt Perry Middle School in Carrollton, Texas. His brother, Thomas Everett, is a former safety in the NFL.
