= Greg Evans (American football) =

American football player (born 1971)

No. 41, 43, 25, 27
- Position: Safety

Personal information
- Born: June 28, 1971 (age 55); Daingerfield, Texas, U.S.
- Listed height: 6 ft 1 in (1.85 m)
- Listed weight: 217 lb (98 kg)

Career information
- High school: Daingerfield
- College: TCU
- NFL draft: 1994: undrafted

Career history
- Buffalo Bills (1994–1995); Washington Redskins (1997)*; Frankfurt Galaxy (1997-1998); Washington Redskins (1998)
- * Offseason or practice squad member only

Awards and highlights
- Second-team All-SWC (1992)

Career NFL statistics
- Tackles: 26
- Interceptions: 1
- Fumble recoveries: 2
- Stats at Pro Football Reference

Gregory Gerard Evans (born June 28, 1971) is an American former professional football player who was a safety in the National Football League (NFL) for the Buffalo Bills and the Washington Redskins. He played college football for the TCU Horned Frogs.

Evans is currently employed with the City of Dallas Fire and Rescue Department. He currently holds the rank of Deputy Chief. He also holds certifications as a state-certified firefighter and paramedic. He has been employed with Dallas Fire Rescue since 1999.
