= Old Morris County Courthouse =

- U.S. National Register of Historic Places
- Texas State Antiquities Landmark
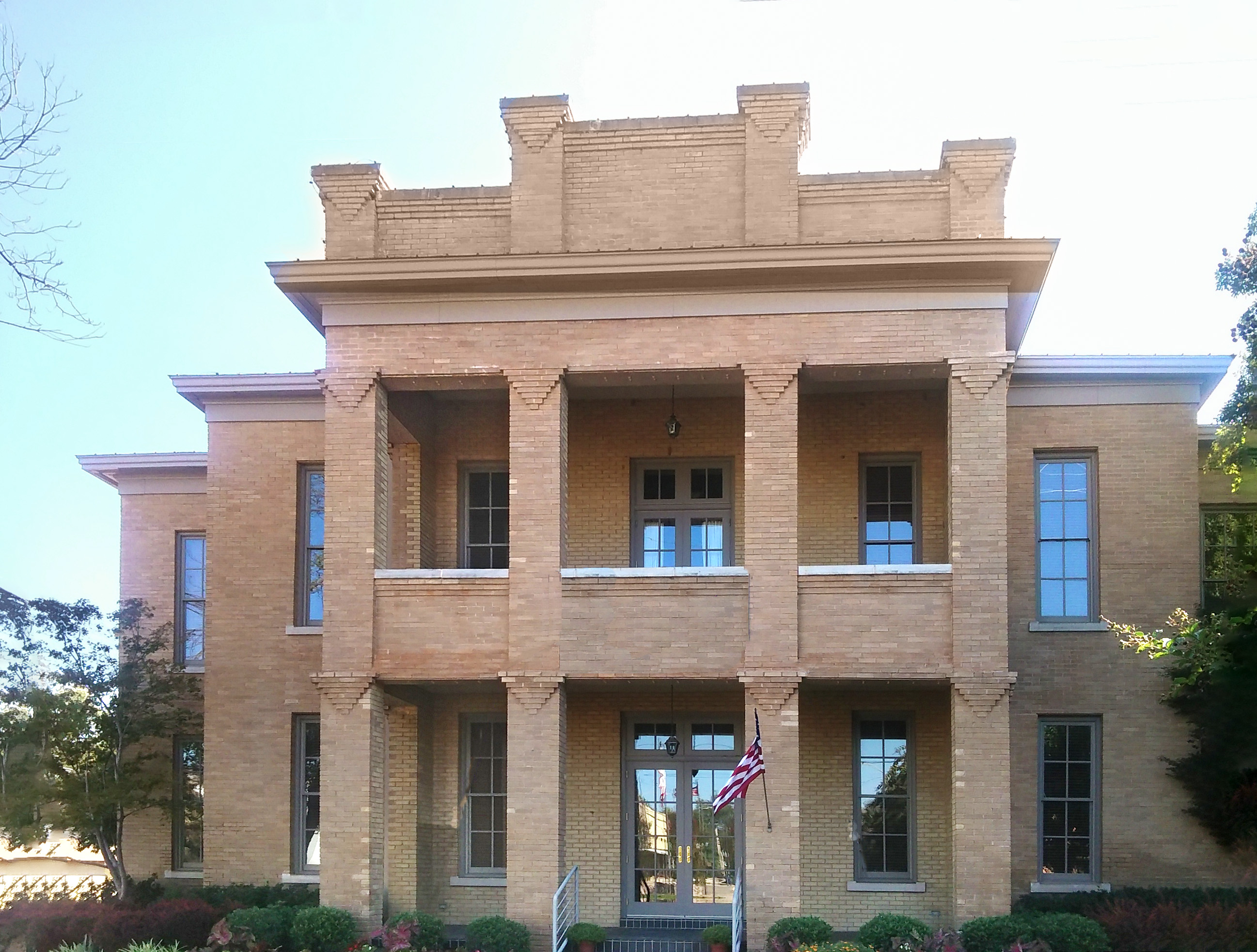
- Old Morris County Courthouse in 2015

- Location within Texas Location within the United States
- Interactive map showing the location of Old Morris County Courthouse
- Location: 101 Linda Dr., Daingerfield, Texas
- Coordinates: 33°1′54″N 94°43′17″W
- Area: less than one acre
- Built: 1882
- Built by: Peterson & Stuckey
- NRHP reference No.: 79002997
- TSAL No.: 8200000483

Significant dates
- Added to NRHP: December 11, 1979
- Designated TSAL: January 1, 1992

The Old Morris County Courthouse in Daingerfield, Texas is a historic courthouse built in 1882. It was listed on the National Register of Historic Places in 1979. It was later used as the Morris County Museum.

It was the first seat of government in Morris County, Texas, which was split from an adjacent county in 1875. It is a copy of the courthouse of Franklin County, Texas.

A new courthouse to serve the county was built in 1972. In 1979, the building served as the headquarters for the Morris County Museum and Historical Society.

== See also ==
- National Register of Historic Places listings in Morris County, Texas
- List of county courthouses in Texas
