= 2004 United States presidential election in Texas =

- November 2, 2004
- Turnout: 56.57% (of registered voters) ▲46.11% (of voting age population)

Nominee	George W. Bush	John Kerry
Party	Republican	Democratic
Home state	Texas	Massachusetts
Running mate	Dick Cheney	John Edwards
Electoral vote	34	0
Popular vote	4,526,917	2,832,704
Percentage	61.09%	38.22%

Bush
50–60%
60–70%
70–80%
80–90%
90–100%
Kerry
50–60%
60–70%
70–80%
80–90%
90–100%
President before election
George W. Bush
Republican
Elected President
George W. Bush
Republican

The 2004 United States presidential election in Texas took place on November 2, 2004, and was part of the 2004 United States presidential election. State voters chose 34 representatives, or electors, to the Electoral College, who voted for president and vice president.

Texas was won by incumbent Republican President George W. Bush by a margin of 22.87%. Prior to the election, all 12 major U.S. news organizations expected Texas to vote for Bush, considering it to be a safe red state. Texas has not voted for a Democratic presidential nominee since 1976, and has been a Republican stronghold since the 1980s. A former governor of the state, Bush's performance stands as a high-water mark for Republican presidential candidates in Texas, and remains the last time that a Republican has won more than 60% of the state's vote, or that a Democrat has won less than 40%. The 1,067,968 ballots cast in Harris County also marked the first time that any Texas county would cast more than one million votes. This is also the most recent election in which the Republican candidate would win Tarrant County with at least 60% of the vote, as of the 2024 election.

Bush, who made historic gains with Hispanic and Latino voters in 2004, drew even with Kerry among Texan Hispanics, winning 49% to Kerry's 50%. Bush's performance with Texas Hispanics would later be surpassed by Republican Donald Trump in 2024, who won a majority of Hispanics in the state and nearly all South Texas counties that year, which even Bush was unable to do.

In 2008 there would be a shift in many of the urban counties Bush carried in this election toward Democratic candidate Barack Obama, though the state would still be won by his Republican opponent, John McCain.

== Primaries ==
- 2004 Texas Democratic presidential primary
- 2004 Texas Republican presidential primary

== Campaign ==
=== Predictions ===
There were 12 news organizations who made state-by-state predictions of the election. Here are their last predictions before election day.

Source	Ranking
D.C. Political Report	Solid R
Cook Political Report	Solid R
Research 2000	Solid R
Zogby International	Likely R
Washington Post	Likely R
Washington Dispatch	Likely R
Washington Times	Solid R
The New York Times	Solid R
CNN	Likely R
Newsweek	Solid R
Associated Press	Solid R
Rasmussen Reports	Likely R

=== Polling ===
Bush won every single pre-election poll, and won each with at least 55% of the vote and a double-digit margin of victory. The final three polls averaged Bush leading 59% to 37%.

=== Fundraising ===
Bush raised $23,776,943. Kerry raised $5,554,831.

=== Advertising and visits ===
Neither campaign advertised or visited this state during the fall election.

== Analysis ==
Texas, located in the South, has become a consistently Republican state at all levels. Economically and racially diverse, Texas includes a huge swath of the Bible Belt where many voters, especially those in rural Texas, identify as born-again or evangelical Christians and therefore tend to vote Republican due to the party's opposition to abortion. Although once part of the Solid South, the last time Texas voted for a Democratic presidential nominee was Jimmy Carter in 1976. George Bush achieved his party's best result in Texas since Ronald Reagan's second landslide in 1984.

President Bush carried 236 of the state's 254 counties, improving on his performance from 2000. East Texas, historically the most Democratic region in the state, solidified its support for the Republican Party with only Jefferson County, home to Beaumont, voting for John Kerry. South Texas, while still voting heavily for Senator Kerry, swung towards Bush as well. Despite Bush's increased margin in the state compared to 2000, Kerry made major inroads in the state's suburban areas, especially in Metro Houston, the Dallas Fort Worth Metroplex, and the Austin area. Kerry narrowed Bush's 2000 margins in Collin, Dallas, Denton, Fort Bend, Harris, Hays, Travis, and Williamson Counties. Out of those, however, only Travis County, home to Austin, flipped into the Democratic column, in part due to the city's strong liberal leanings and opposition to the Iraq War. Bush had won a plurality in the county in 2000 in part due to the Green Party's Ralph Nader winning 11% of the county's vote. Although Bush carried Dallas County by a narrow margin of 1.40%, the city of Dallas' urban core voted heavily for Kerry, giving him 58% of the vote.

Bush is the last Republican to win any of the following counties in a presidential election: Bexar (home of San Antonio), Dallas (home of Dallas), and Harris (home of Houston). Frio, Kleberg, Reeves, Val Verde counties would not vote Republican again until 2020. Cameron and Culberson counties would not vote Republican again until 2024.

== Results ==
2004 United States presidential election in Texas
Party	Candidate	Votes	Percentage	Electoral votes
Republican Party	George W. Bush (incumbent)	4,526,917	61.09%	34
Democratic	John Kerry	2,832,704	38.22%	0
Libertarian	Michael Badnarik	38,787	0.52%	0
Write-in	Ralph Nader	9,159	0.12%	0
Write-in	Michael Peroutka	1,636	0.02%	0
Write-in	David Cobb	1,014	0.01%	0
Write-in	Andrew J. Falk	219	0.00%	0
Write-in	John Joseph Kennedy	126	0.00%	0
Write-in	Walt Brown	111	0.00%	0
Write-in	Deborah Elaine Allen	92	0.00%	0
Totals		7,410,765	100.00%	34
Voter turnout (voting age population)				46.7%

=== By county ===
County	George W. Bush Republican		John Kerry Democratic		Various candidates Other parties		Margin		Total
County	#	%	#	%	#	%	#	%	Total
Anderson	11,525	70.70%	4,678	28.70%	98	0.60%	6,847	42.00%	16,301
Andrews	3,837	84.59%	677	14.93%	22	0.49%	3,160	69.66%	4,536
Angelina	18,932	66.75%	9,302	32.80%	130	0.46%	9,630	33.95%	28,364
Aransas	6,569	70.88%	2,640	28.49%	59	0.63%	3,929	42.39%	9,268
Archer	3,556	79.89%	878	19.73%	17	0.38%	2,678	60.16%	4,451
Armstrong	830	82.67%	170	16.93%	98	0.60%	660	65.74%	1,004
Atascosa	7,635	63.02%	4,421	36.49%	60	0.49%	3,214	26.53%	12,116
Austin	8,072	75.43%	2,582	24.13%	48	0.45%	5,490	51.30%	10,702
Bailey	1,882	78.03%	525	21.77%	5	0.21%	1,357	56.26%	2,412
Bandera	6,933	79.32%	1,738	19.88%	70	0.80%	5,195	59.44%	8,741
Bastrop	13,290	56.70%	9,794	41.78%	357	1.52%	3,496	14.92%	23,441
Baylor	1,169	71.28%	467	28.48%	4	0.24%	702	42.80%	1,640
Bee	5,428	57.03%	4,045	42.50%	45	0.48%	1,383	14.53%	9,518
Bell	52,135	65.39%	27,165	34.07%	424	0.53%	24,970	31.32%	79,724
Bexar	260,698	54.85%	210,976	44.39%	3,640	0.76%	49,722	10.46%	475,314
Blanco	3,277	71.49%	1,267	27.64%	40	0.87%	2,010	43.85%	4,584
Borden	303	84.40%	55	15.32%	1	0.28%	248	69.08%	359
Bosque	5,737	75.63%	1,815	23.93%	34	0.45%	3,922	51.70%	7,586
Bowie	21,791	64.55%	11,880	35.19%	89	0.26%	9,911	29.36%	33,760
Brazoria	63,662	68.27%	28,904	31.00%	682	0.74%	34,758	37.27%	93,248
Brazos	37,594	69.22%	16,128	29.70%	587	1.08%	21,466	39.52%	54,309
Brewster	1,980	52.66%	1,729	45.98%	51	1.36%	251	6.68%	3,760
Briscoe	620	76.45%	191	23.55%	0	0.00%	429	52.90%	811
Brooks	845	31.60%	1,823	68.18%	6	0.22%	-978	-36.58%	2,674
Brown	11,640	81.67%	2,523	17.70%	90	0.63%	9,117	63.97%	14,253
Burleson	4,405	65.54%	2,276	33.86%	40	0.59%	2,129	31.68%	6,721
Burnet	11,456	72.77%	4,147	26.34%	139	0.89%	7,309	46.43%	15,742
Caldwell	6,436	55.55%	5,052	43.60%	99	0.85%	1,384	11.95%	11,587
Calhoun	4,348	62.75%	2,561	36.96%	20	0.29%	1,787	25.79%	6,929
Callahan	4,542	80.33%	1,073	18.98%	39	0.69%	3,469	61.35%	5,654
Cameron	34,801	50.32%	33,998	49.16%	357	0.52%	803	1.16%	69,156
Camp	2,638	59.43%	1,778	40.05%	23	0.52%	860	19.38%	4,439
Carson	2,450	83.22%	485	16.47%	9	0.30%	1,965	66.75%	2,944
Cass	7,383	61.27%	4,630	38.43%	36	0.30%	2,753	22.84%	12,049
Castro	1,794	73.83%	631	25.97%	5	0.21%	1,163	47.86%	2,430
Chambers	8,618	73.98%	2,953	25.35%	78	0.67%	5,665	48.63%	11,649
Cherokee	11,329	71.53%	4,439	28.03%	71	0.45%	6,890	43.50%	15,839
Childress	1,629	75.98%	511	23.83%	4	0.19%	1,118	52.15%	2,144
Clay	3,971	75.09%	1,299	24.57%	18	0.34%	2,672	50.52%	5,288
Cochran	856	77.12%	249	22.43%	5	0.45%	607	54.69%	1,110
Coke	1,338	83.11%	266	16.52%	6	0.37%	1,072	66.59%	1,610
Coleman	3,035	79.33%	778	20.33%	13	0.34%	2,257	59.00%	3,826
Collin	174,435	71.15%	68,935	28.12%	1,784	0.73%	105,500	43.03%	245,154
Collingsworth	1,051	75.18%	346	24.75%	1	0.07%	705	50.43%	1,398
Colorado	5,488	71.37%	2,161	28.10%	41	0.54%	3,327	43.27%	7,690
Comal	31,574	76.93%	9,153	22.30%	316	0.77%	22,421	54.63%	41,043
Comanche	3,813	72.38%	1,431	27.16%	24	0.46%	2,382	45.22%	5,268
Concho	911	76.36%	270	22.63%	12	1.01%	641	53.73%	1,193
Cooke	11,908	78.82%	3,142	20.80%	57	0.37%	8,766	58.02%	15,107
Coryell	12,421	70.47%	5,122	29.06%	82	0.46%	7,299	41.41%	17,625
Cottle	549	71.48%	214	27.86%	5	0.65%	335	43.62%	768
Crane	1,314	83.48%	254	16.14%	6	0.38%	1,060	67.34%	1,574
Crockett	1,248	72.22%	473	27.37%	7	0.41%	775	44.85%	1,728
Crosby	1,647	72.40%	622	27.34%	6	0.26%	1,025	45.06%	2,275
Culberson	407	51.65%	375	47.59%	6	0.76%	32	4.06%	788
Dallam	1,473	82.66%	305	17.12%	4	0.22%	1,168	65.54%	1,782
Dallas	346,246	50.35%	336,641	48.95%	4,822	0.70%	9,605	1.40%	687,709
Dawson	3,419	75.23%	1,114	24.51%	12	0.26%	2,305	50.72%	4,545
Deaf Smith	4,139	78.23%	1,133	21.41%	19	0.36%	3,006	56.82%	5,291
Delta	1,447	69.50%	627	30.12%	8	0.39%	820	39.38%	2,082
Denton	140,891	69.95%	59,346	29.47%	1,173	0.58%	81,545	40.48%	201,410
DeWitt	5,100	75.76%	1,610	23.92%	22	0.33%	3,490	51.84%	6,732
Dickens	815	76.67%	245	23.05%	3	0.28%	570	53.62%	1,063
Dimmit	1,188	33.31%	2,365	66.32%	13	0.36%	-1,177	-33.01%	3,566
Donley	1,429	80.10%	349	19.56%	6	0.34%	1,080	60.54%	1,784
Duval	1,160	28.35%	2,916	71.28%	15	0.37%	-1,756	-42.93%	4,091
Eastland	5,249	76.55%	1,582	23.07%	26	0.38%	3,667	53.48%	6,857
Ector	27,502	75.74%	8,579	23.63%	229	0.63%	18,923	52.11%	36,310
Edwards	745	77.36%	217	22.53%	1	0.10%	528	54.83%	963
Ellis	34,602	74.50%	11,640	25.06%	202	0.43%	22,962	49.44%	46,444
El Paso	73,261	43.20%	95,142	56.11%	1,170	0.69%	-21,881	-12.91%	169,573
Erath	9,506	77.40%	2,710	22.07%	65	0.53%	6,796	55.33%	12,281
Falls	3,454	58.52%	2,427	41.12%	21	0.36%	1,027	17.40%	5,902
Fannin	7,893	65.99%	4,001	33.45%	66	0.56%	3,892	32.54%	11,960
Fayette	7,527	72.40%	2,803	26.96%	67	0.64%	4,724	45.44%	10,397
Fisher	1,161	60.37%	758	39.42%	4	0.21%	403	20.95%	1,923
Floyd	2,032	78.64%	545	21.09%	7	0.27%	1,487	57.55%	2,584
Foard	347	59.11%	235	40.03%	5	0.85%	112	19.08%	587
Fort Bend	93,625	57.38%	68,722	42.12%	822	0.50%	24,903	15.26%	163,169
Franklin	3,185	75.53%	1,011	23.97%	21	0.50%	2,174	51.56%	4,217
Freestone	5,057	70.62%	2,070	28.91%	34	0.48%	2,987	41.71%	7,161
Frio	1,991	50.66%	1,931	49.13%	8	0.20%	60	1.53%	3,930
Gaines	3,540	85.01%	608	14.60%	16	0.38%	2,932	70.41%	4,164
Galveston	61,290	57.83%	43,919	41.44%	772	0.73%	17,371	16.39%	105,981
Garza	1,480	81.68%	326	17.99%	6	0.34%	1,154	63.69%	1,812
Gillespie	9,297	80.47%	2,104	18.21%	152	1.32%	7,193	62.26%	11,553
Glasscock	488	91.56%	44	8.26%	1	0.19%	444	83.30%	533
Goliad	2,267	64.75%	1,219	34.82%	15	0.42%	1,048	29.93%	3,501
Gonzales	4,291	71.26%	1,709	28.38%	22	0.37%	2,582	42.88%	6,022
Gray	7,260	84.69%	1,289	15.04%	23	0.27%	5,971	69.65%	8,572
Grayson	30,777	69.28%	13,452	30.28%	194	0.44%	17,325	39.00%	44,423
Gregg	29,939	70.61%	12,306	29.02%	153	0.36%	17,633	41.59%	42,398
Grimes	5,263	65.54%	2,713	33.79%	54	0.67%	2,550	31.75%	8,030
Guadalupe	28,208	72.79%	10,290	26.55%	254	0.65%	17,918	46.24%	38,752
Hale	8,025	79.03%	2,078	20.46%	51	0.51%	5,947	58.57%	10,154
Hall	860	67.35%	413	32.34%	4	0.31%	447	35.01%	1,277
Hamilton	2,856	76.57%	845	22.65%	29	0.78%	2,011	53.92%	3,730
Hansford	1,903	88.64%	240	11.18%	4	0.19%	1,663	77.46%	2,147
Hardeman	1,214	71.33%	480	28.20%	8	0.47%	734	43.13%	1,702
Hardin	15,030	72.57%	5,608	27.08%	72	0.35%	9,422	45.49%	20,710
Harris	584,723	54.75%	475,865	44.56%	7,380	0.69%	108,858	10.19%	1,067,968
Harrison	16,473	62.82%	9,642	36.77%	108	0.41%	6,831	26.05%	26,223
Hartley	1,736	84.31%	315	15.30%	8	0.39%	1,421	69.01%	2,059
Haskell	1,539	63.70%	867	35.89%	10	0.41%	672	27.81%	2,416
Hays	27,021	56.50%	20,110	42.05%	692	1.45%	6,911	14.45%	47,823
Hemphill	1,380	83.99%	257	15.64%	6	0.36%	1,123	68.35%	1,643
Henderson	20,210	70.05%	8,505	29.48%	134	0.46%	11,705	40.57%	28,849
Hidalgo	50,931	44.80%	62,369	54.86%	383	0.34%	-11,438	-10.06%	113,683
Hill	9,225	70.67%	3,751	28.74%	77	0.59%	5,474	41.93%	13,053
Hockley	6,160	81.30%	1,385	18.28%	32	0.42%	4,775	63.02%	7,577
Hood	16,280	76.46%	4,865	22.85%	148	0.69%	11,415	53.61%	21,293
Hopkins	8,582	71.15%	3,443	28.54%	37	0.31%	5,139	42.61%	12,062
Houston	5,848	66.41%	2,921	33.17%	37	0.42%	2,927	33.24%	8,806
Howard	7,480	73.33%	2,663	26.11%	58	0.57%	4,817	47.22%	10,201
Hudspeth	577	65.12%	302	34.09%	7	0.79%	275	31.03%	886
Hunt	20,065	71.17%	7,971	28.27%	158	0.56%	12,094	42.90%	28,194
Hutchinson	7,839	83.67%	1,503	16.04%	27	0.29%	6,336	67.63%	9,369
Irion	684	82.61%	141	17.03%	3	0.36%	543	65.58%	828
Jack	2,470	79.01%	643	20.57%	13	0.42%	1,827	58.44%	3,126
Jackson	3,766	74.18%	1,296	25.53%	15	0.30%	2,470	48.65%	5,077
Jasper	8,347	64.84%	4,471	34.73%	55	0.43%	3,876	30.11%	12,873
Jeff Davis	764	65.47%	378	32.39%	25	2.14%	386	33.08%	1,167
Jefferson	44,423	48.36%	47,066	51.23%	377	0.41%	-2,643	-2.87%	91,866
Jim Hogg	712	34.48%	1,344	65.08%	9	0.44%	-632	-30.60%	2,065
Jim Wells	5,817	45.84%	6,824	53.77%	50	0.40%	-1,007	-7.93%	12,691
Johnson	34,818	73.42%	12,325	25.99%	279	0.58%	22,493	47.43%	47,422
Jones	4,254	71.72%	1,658	27.95%	19	0.32%	2,596	43.77%	5,931
Karnes	3,114	66.64%	1,543	33.02%	16	0.35%	1,571	33.62%	4,673
Kaufman	21,304	70.16%	8,947	29.46%	115	0.38%	12,357	40.70%	30,366
Kendall	11,434	81.25%	2,532	17.99%	106	0.75%	8,902	63.26%	14,072
Kenedy	82	48.52%	85	50.30%	2	1.18%	-3	-1.78%	169
Kent	382	73.18%	138	26.44%	2	0.38%	244	46.74%	522
Kerr	16,538	77.84%	4,557	21.45%	151	0.71%	11,981	56.39%	21,246
Kimble	1,482	81.61%	324	17.84%	10	0.56%	1,158	63.77%	1,816
King	137	87.82%	18	11.54%	1	0.64%	119	76.28%	156
Kinney	1,051	65.69%	542	33.88%	7	0.44%	509	31.81%	1,600
Kleberg	5,366	53.81%	4,550	45.62%	57	0.57%	816	8.19%	9,973
Knox	1,081	69.65%	464	29.90%	7	0.45%	617	39.75%	1,552
Lamar	12,054	69.00%	5,338	30.56%	78	0.44%	6,716	38.44%	17,470
Lamb	3,410	79.84%	857	20.07%	4	0.09%	2,553	59.77%	4,271
Lampasas	5,422	77.18%	1,593	22.68%	10	0.14%	3,829	54.50%	7,025
La Salle	989	44.35%	1,229	55.11%	12	0.53%	-240	-10.76%	2,230
Lavaca	5,974	73.06%	2,152	26.32%	51	0.62%	3,822	46.74%	8,177
Lee	4,160	68.33%	1,899	31.19%	29	0.48%	2,261	37.14%	6,088
Leon	5,023	73.88%	1,754	25.80%	22	0.32%	3,269	48.08%	6,799
Liberty	14,821	68.33%	6,780	31.26%	90	0.41%	8,041	37.07%	21,691
Limestone	5,028	64.31%	2,752	35.20%	38	0.48%	2,276	29.11%	7,818
Lipscomb	1,147	85.79%	184	13.76%	6	0.45%	963	72.03%	1,337
Live Oak	3,147	74.91%	1,036	24.66%	18	0.43%	2,111	50.25%	4,201
Llano	7,241	75.72%	2,257	23.60%	65	0.68%	4,984	52.12%	9,563
Loving	65	81.25%	12	15.00%	3	3.75%	53	66.25%	80
Lubbock	70,135	75.29%	22,472	24.12%	544	0.58%	47,663	51.17%	93,151
Lynn	1,776	78.20%	490	21.58%	5	0.22%	1,286	56.62%	2,271
McCulloch	2,465	76.55%	745	23.14%	10	0.31%	1,720	53.41%	3,220
McLennan	52,090	65.73%	26,760	33.76%	404	0.51%	25,330	31.97%	79,254
McMullen	467	82.80%	95	16.84%	2	0.35%	372	65.96%	564
Madison	2,837	69.18%	1,235	30.11%	29	0.71%	1,602	39.07%	4,101
Marion	2,441	56.14%	1,884	43.33%	23	0.53%	557	12.81%	4,348
Martin	1,514	83.79%	288	15.94%	5	0.28%	1,226	67.85%	1,807
Mason	1,600	77.03%	459	22.10%	18	0.87%	1,141	54.93%	2,077
Matagorda	8,119	64.84%	4,355	34.78%	47	0.37%	3,764	30.06%	12,521
Maverick	4,025	40.11%	5,948	59.28%	61	0.61%	-1,923	-19.17%	10,034
Medina	10,389	70.07%	4,322	29.15%	115	0.78%	6,067	40.92%	14,826
Menard	761	68.99%	331	30.01%	11	1.00%	430	38.98%	1,103
Midland	36,585	81.60%	8,005	17.85%	244	0.54%	28,580	63.75%	44,834
Milam	5,291	60.24%	3,445	39.22%	47	0.53%	1,846	21.02%	8,783
Mills	1,794	80.41%	416	18.65%	21	0.94%	1,378	61.76%	2,231
Mitchell	1,912	74.75%	639	24.98%	7	0.27%	1,273	49.77%	2,558
Montague	5,910	74.84%	1,946	24.64%	41	0.52%	3,964	50.20%	7,897
Montgomery	104,654	78.11%	28,628	21.37%	706	0.53%	76,026	56.74%	133,988
Moore	4,601	81.75%	1,009	17.93%	18	0.32%	3,592	63.82%	5,628
Morris	2,818	53.39%	2,437	46.17%	23	0.43%	381	7.22%	5,278
Motley	564	82.46%	113	16.52%	7	1.02%	451	65.94%	684
Nacogdoches	14,160	65.96%	7,152	33.32%	154	0.71%	7,008	32.64%	21,466
Navarro	10,715	66.83%	5,259	32.80%	60	0.37%	5,456	34.03%	16,034
Newton	3,159	55.42%	2,513	44.09%	28	0.50%	646	11.33%	5,700
Nolan	3,722	70.37%	1,541	29.14%	26	0.49%	2,181	41.23%	5,289
Nueces	59,359	56.77%	44,439	42.50%	762	0.73%	14,920	14.27%	104,560
Ochiltree	2,922	91.97%	251	7.90%	4	0.13%	2,671	84.07%	3,177
Oldham	733	86.95%	108	12.81%	2	0.24%	625	74.14%	843
Orange	20,292	63.60%	11,476	35.97%	140	0.44%	8,816	27.63%	31,908
Palo Pinto	7,137	71.27%	2,816	28.12%	61	0.61%	4,321	43.15%	10,014
Panola	7,021	70.16%	2,958	29.56%	28	0.28%	4,063	40.60%	10,007
Parker	31,795	77.63%	8,966	21.89%	196	0.48%	22,829	55.74%	40,957
Parmer	2,375	85.65%	389	14.03%	9	0.32%	1,986	71.62%	2,773
Pecos	3,167	71.52%	1,242	28.05%	19	0.43%	1,925	43.47%	4,428
Polk	13,778	66.09%	6,964	33.41%	104	0.50%	6,814	32.68%	20,846
Potter	21,401	73.65%	7,489	25.77%	166	0.57%	13,912	47.88%	29,056
Presidio	715	37.83%	1,159	61.32%	16	0.85%	-444	-23.49%	1,890
Rains	2,998	70.89%	1,213	28.68%	18	0.43%	1,785	42.21%	4,229
Randall	40,520	83.40%	7,849	16.15%	218	0.45%	32,671	67.25%	48,587
Reagan	956	83.64%	184	16.10%	3	0.26%	772	67.54%	1,143
Real	1,314	79.88%	325	19.76%	6	0.36%	989	60.12%	1,645
Red River	3,379	61.55%	2,097	38.20%	14	0.26%	1,282	23.35%	5,490
Reeves	1,777	52.34%	1,600	47.13%	18	0.53%	177	5.21%	3,395
Refugio	2,212	64.02%	1,232	35.66%	11	0.32%	980	28.36%	3,455
Roberts	461	90.93%	46	9.07%	0	0.00%	415	81.86%	507
Robertson	3,792	55.81%	2,979	43.84%	24	0.35%	813	11.97%	6,795
Rockwall	20,120	78.65%	5,320	20.80%	141	0.55%	14,800	57.85%	25,581
Runnels	3,239	80.00%	792	19.56%	18	0.44%	2,447	60.44%	4,049
Rusk	13,390	72.99%	4,899	26.71%	55	0.30%	8,491	46.28%	18,344
Sabine	3,138	67.64%	1,476	31.82%	25	0.54%	1,662	35.82%	4,639
San Augustine	2,235	59.49%	1,506	40.09%	16	0.42%	729	19.40%	3,757
San Jacinto	5,394	66.39%	2,688	33.08%	43	0.53%	2,706	33.31%	8,125
San Patricio	13,474	63.20%	7,764	36.42%	82	0.38%	5,710	26.78%	21,320
San Saba	1,894	77.91%	529	21.76%	8	0.33%	1,365	56.15%	2,431
Schleicher	1,012	76.15%	312	23.48%	5	0.38%	700	52.67%	1,329
Scurry	4,576	82.12%	981	17.61%	15	0.27%	3,595	64.51%	5,572
Shackelford	1,292	84.61%	229	15.00%	6	0.39%	1,063	69.61%	1,527
Shelby	6,295	67.84%	2,951	31.80%	33	0.36%	3,344	36.04%	9,279
Sherman	942	88.37%	124	11.63%	0	0.00%	818	76.74%	1,066
Smith	53,392	72.48%	19,970	27.11%	302	0.41%	33,422	45.37%	73,664
Somervell	2,701	76.06%	831	23.40%	19	0.54%	1,870	52.66%	3,551
Starr	2,552	26.09%	7,199	73.60%	30	0.31%	-4,647	-47.51%	9,781
Stephens	2,803	79.65%	703	19.98%	13	0.37%	2,100	59.67%	3,519
Sterling	544	88.46%	71	11.54%	0	0.00%	473	76.92%	615
Stonewall	499	66.36%	250	33.24%	3	0.40%	249	33.12%	752
Sutton	1,173	80.73%	280	19.27%	0	0.00%	893	61.46%	1,453
Swisher	1,487	70.14%	626	29.53%	7	0.33%	861	40.61%	2,120
Tarrant	349,462	62.39%	207,286	37.01%	3,393	0.61%	142,176	25.38%	560,141
Taylor	37,197	77.33%	10,648	22.14%	254	0.53%	26,549	55.19%	48,099
Terrell	306	65.25%	159	33.90%	4	0.85%	147	31.35%	469
Terry	3,166	79.75%	794	20.00%	10	0.25%	2,372	59.75%	3,970
Throckmorton	656	76.01%	202	23.41%	5	0.58%	454	52.60%	863
Titus	5,709	64.10%	3,173	35.62%	25	0.28%	2,536	28.48%	8,907
Tom Green	28,185	75.33%	9,007	24.07%	225	0.61%	19,178	51.26%	37,417
Travis	147,885	42.00%	197,235	56.01%	6,993	1.98%	-49,350	-14.01%	352,113
Trinity	3,985	64.14%	2,204	35.47%	24	0.38%	1,781	28.67%	6,213
Tyler	5,043	65.11%	2,659	34.33%	43	0.56%	2,384	30.78%	7,745
Upshur	10,232	70.44%	4,225	29.09%	69	0.47%	6,007	41.35%	14,526
Upton	1,009	84.29%	185	15.46%	3	0.25%	824	68.83%	1,197
Uvalde	5,148	60.69%	3,298	38.88%	37	0.43%	1,850	21.81%	8,483
Val Verde	6,968	59.08%	4,757	40.33%	70	0.60%	2,211	18.75%	11,795
Van Zandt	14,976	75.42%	4,822	24.28%	58	0.29%	10,154	51.14%	19,856
Victoria	20,875	70.52%	8,553	28.89%	174	0.59%	12,322	41.63%	29,602
Walker	11,710	65.71%	5,977	33.54%	135	0.76%	5,733	32.17%	17,822
Waller	7,679	55.32%	6,145	44.27%	57	0.41%	1,534	11.05%	13,881
Ward	2,856	75.80%	901	23.91%	11	0.29%	1,955	51.89%	3,768
Washington	9,597	73.47%	3,389	25.94%	77	0.59%	6,208	47.53%	13,063
Webb	17,753	42.72%	23,654	56.92%	149	0.35%	-5,901	-14.20%	41,556
Wharton	9,288	66.16%	4,702	33.49%	49	0.35%	4,586	32.67%	14,039
Wheeler	1,960	81.87%	420	17.54%	14	0.59%	1,540	64.33%	2,394
Wichita	32,472	71.30%	12,819	28.15%	254	0.56%	19,653	43.15%	45,545
Wilbarger	3,685	73.85%	1,284	25.73%	21	0.42%	2,401	48.12%	4,990
Willacy	2,209	44.52%	2,734	55.10%	19	0.38%	-525	-10.58%	4,962
Williamson	83,284	64.97%	43,117	33.63%	1,797	1.40%	40,167	31.34%	128,198
Wilson	10,400	69.87%	4,409	29.62%	76	0.51%	5,991	40.25%	14,885
Winkler	1,604	80.12%	391	19.53%	7	0.35%	1,213	60.59%	2,002
Wise	15,177	75.71%	4,783	23.86%	87	0.43%	10,394	51.85%	20,047
Wood	12,831	75.79%	4,034	23.83%	64	0.38%	8,797	51.96%	16,929
Yoakum	2,228	85.27%	376	14.39%	9	0.35%	1,852	70.88%	2,613
Young	5,874	79.28%	1,511	20.39%	24	0.32%	4,363	58.89%	7,409
Zapata	1,228	42.37%	1,662	57.35%	8	0.28%	-434	-14.98%	2,898
Zavala	777	24.92%	2,332	74.79%	9	0.29%	-1,555	-49.87%	3,118
Totals	4,526,917	61.09%	2,832,704	38.22%	51,144	0.69%	1,694,213	22.87%	7,410,765

==== Counties that flipped from Democratic to Republican ====
- Cameron (largest city: Brownsville)
- Culberson (largest city: Van Horn)
- Frio (largest city: Pearsall)
- Morris (largest city: Daingerfield)
- Newton (largest city: Newton)
- Reeves (largest city: Pecos)
- Robertson (largest city: Hearne)

==== Counties that flipped from Republican to Democratic ====
- Travis (largest city: Austin)

=== By congressional district ===
Bush won 25 of 32 congressional districts, including four held by Democrats.

District	Bush	Kerry	Representative
1st	69%	31%	Max Sandlin
1st	69%	31%	Louie Gohmert
2nd	63%	37%	Jim Turner
2nd	63%	37%	Ted Poe
3rd	67%	33%	Sam Johnson
4th	70%	30%	Ralph Hall
5th	67%	33%	Jeb Hensarling
6th	66%	34%	Joe Barton
7th	64%	36%	John Culberson
8th	72%	28%	Kevin Brady
9th	30%	70%	Nick Lampson
9th	30%	70%	Al Green
10th	62%	38%	Lloyd Doggett
10th	62%	38%	Michael McCaul
11th	78%	22%	Chet Edwards
11th	78%	22%	Mike Conaway
12th	67%	33%	Kay Granger
13th	78%	22%	Mac Thornberry
14th	67%	33%	Ron Paul
15th	51%	49%	Rubén Hinojosa
16th	44%	56%	Silvestre Reyes
17th	70%	30%	Charles Stenholm
17th	70%	30%	Chet Edwards
18th	28%	72%	Sheila Jackson Lee
19th	77%	23%	Randy Neugebauer
20th	45%	55%	Charlie Gonzalez
21st	66%	34%	Lamar S. Smith
22nd	64%	36%	Tom DeLay
23rd	57%	43%	Henry Bonilla
24th	65%	35%	Martin Frost
24th	65%	35%	Kenny Marchant
25th	46%	54%	Chris Bell
25th	46%	54%	Lloyd Doggett
26th	65%	35%	Michael C. Burgess
27th	55%	45%	Solomon Ortiz
28th	54%	46%	Ciro Rodriguez
28th	54%	46%	Henry Cuellar
29th	44%	56%	Gene Green
30th	25%	75%	Eddie Bernice Johnson
31st	67%	33%	John Carter
32nd	60%	40%	Pete Sessions

== Electors ==
Technically the voters of Texas cast their ballots for electors: representatives to the Electoral College. Texas is allocated 34 electors because it has 32 congressional districts and two senators. All candidates who appear on the ballot or qualify to receive write-in votes must submit a list of 34 electors, who pledge to vote for their candidate and his or her running mate. Whoever wins the majority of votes in the state is awarded all 34 electoral votes. Their chosen electors then vote for president and vice president. Although electors are pledged to their candidate and running mate, they are not obligated to vote for them. An elector who votes for someone other than his or her candidate is known as a faithless elector.

The electors of each state and the District of Columbia met on December 13, 2004, to cast their votes for president and vice president. The Electoral College itself never meets as one body. Instead, the electors from each state and the District of Columbia met in their respective capitols.

The following were the members of the Electoral College from the state. All 34 were pledged to Bush/Cheney:

1. Royce Hayes
2. Tom Cotter
3. Jay Pierce
4. Marjorie Chandler
5. Lance Lenz
6. Barbara Grusendorf
7. Bill Borden
8. Jim Wiggins
9. Anna Rice
10. Jan Galbraith
11. Sue Brannon
12. Cheryl Surber
13. Mike Ussery
14. Sid Young
15. Frank Morris
16. Roger O'Dell
17. Christopher DeCluitt
18. Martha Greenlaw
19. Marcus Anderson
20. Mike Provost
21. Bennie Bock
22. Kathy Haigler
23. Kim Hesley
24. Peter Wrench
25. Morris Woods
26. Rhealyn Samuelson
27. Nancy Stevens
28. Loyce McCarter
29. Larry Bowles
30. Dan Mosher
31. Glenn Warren
32. Kristina Kiik
33. Susan Weddington
34. Charles Burchett

== See also ==
- United States presidential elections in Texas
- Presidency of George W. Bush
