= 2004 Texas Republican presidential primary =

- March 9, 2004

135 pledged delegates to the 2004 Republican National Convention
- Turnout: 5.61%

Candidate	George W. Bush	Uncommitted
Home state	Texas
Delegate count	135	0
Popular vote	635,948	51,667
Percentage	92.49%	7.51%
- Primary results by county Bush: 80–85% 85–90% 90–95% 95–100% No votes

The 2004 Texas Republican presidential primary was held on March 9 in the U.S. state of Texas as one of the Republican Party's statewide nomination contests ahead of the 2004 presidential election. Incumbent George W. Bush won the primary in a landslide.

== Results ==
2004 Texas Republican presidential primary
Candidate	Votes	%	Delegates
George W. Bush (incumbent)	635,948	92.49	135
Uncommitted	51,667	7.51	0
Total	687,615	100%	135

=== Results by county ===
2004 Texas Republican presidential primary (results by county)
County	George W. Bush		Uncommitted		Total votes cast
County	Votes	%	Votes	%	Total votes cast
Anderson	3,069	89.61%	356	10.39%	3,425
Andrews	307	97.15%	9	2.85%	316
Angelina	2,859	95.94%	121	4.06%	2,980
Aransas	2,272	89.63%	263	10.37%	2,535
Archer	160	95.81%	7	4.19%	167
Armstrong	348	87.22%	51	12.78%	399
Atascosa	507	96.20%	20	3.80%	527
Austin	2,384	91.69%	216	8.31%	2,600
Bailey	654	93.30%	47	6.70%	701
Bandera	2,920	86.90%	440	13.10%	3,360
Bastrop	2,681	92.99%	202	7.01%	2,883
Baylor	31	93.94%	2	6.06%	33
Bee	702	93.10%	52	6.90%	754
Bell	7,913	95.18%	401	4.82%	8,314
Bexar	20,340	94.57%	1,167	5.43%	21,507
Blanco	835	92.78%	65	7.22%	900
Borden	6	100%	0	0%	6
Bosque	961	96.00%	40	4.00%	1,001
Bowie	3,556	95.31%	175	4.69%	3,731
Brazoria	10,796	89.08%	1,323	10.92%	12,119
Brazos	7,870	91.00%	778	9.00%	8,648
Brewster	260	95.24%	13	4.76%	273
Briscoe	92	98.92%	1	1.08%	93
Brooks	No votes cast				0
Brown	3,413	94.05%	216	5.95%	3,629
Burleson	1,066	95.61%	49	4.39%	1,115
Burnet	3,376	90.53%	353	9.47%	3,729
Caldwell	1,103	94.60%	63	5.40%	1,166
Calhoun	254	94.78%	14	5.22%	268
Callahan	498	93.26%	36	6.74%	534
Cameron	2,359	95.16%	120	4.84%	2,479
Camp	88	96.70%	3	3.30%	91
Carson	554	94.38%	33	5.62%	587
Cass	452	98.69%	6	1.31%	458
Castro	193	90.61%	20	9.39%	213
Chambers	1,723	91.70%	156	8.30%	1,879
Cherokee	828	98.57%	12	1.43%	840
Childress	73	100%	0	0%	73
Clay	166	96.51%	6	3.49%	172
Cochran	60	100%	0	0%	60
Coke	58	96.67%	2	3.33%	60
Coleman	270	97.12%	8	2.88%	278
Collin	15,038	91.84%	1,336	8.16%	16,374
Collingsworth	97	95.10%	5	4.90%	102
Colorado	675	95.34%	33	4.66%	708
Comal	5,205	92.01%	452	7.99%	5,657
Comanche	326	98.19%	6	1.81%	332
Concho	102	96.23%	4	3.77%	106
Cooke	4,284	86.69%	658	13.31%	4,942
Coryell	2,847	92.05%	246	7.95%	3,093
Cottle	No votes cast				0
Crane	114	100%	0	0%	114
Crockett	No votes cast				0
Crosby	No votes cast				0
Culberson	7	100%	0	0%	7
Dallam	341	95.25%	17	4.75%	358
Dallas	28,076	93.47%	1,962	6.53%	30,038
Dawson	316	97.53%	8	2.47%	324
Deaf Smith	1,132	93.09%	84	6.91%	1,216
Delta	40	100%	0	0%	40
Denton	13,201	88.47%	1,721	11.53%	14,922
DeWitt	1,442	92.08%	124	7.92%	1,566
Dickens	9	100%	0	0%	9
Dimmit	3	100%	0	0%	3
Donley	150	98.04%	3	1.96%	153
Duval	No votes cast				0
Eastland	950	93.32%	68	6.68%	1,018
Ector	10,701	93.98%	685	6.02%	11,386
Edwards	95	100%	0	0%	95
Ellis	3,920	92.19%	332	7.81%	4,252
El Paso	7,776	94.50%	453	5.50%	8,229
Erath	949	97.03%	29	2.97%	978
Falls	187	97.91%	4	2.09%	191
Fannin	1,081	94.00%	69	6.00%	1,150
Fayette	2,063	94.07%	130	5.93%	2,193
Fisher	9	100%	0	0%	9
Floyd	245	97.22%	7	2.78%	252
Foard	No votes cast				0
Fort Bend	12,311	92.30%	1,027	7.70%	13,338
Franklin	628	96.17%	25	3.83%	653
Freestone	314	98.43%	5	1.57%	319
Frio	16	94.12%	1	5.88%	17
Gaines	375	98.43%	6	1.57%	381
Galveston	4,556	94.52%	264	5.48%	4,820
Garza	103	100%	0	0%	103
Gillespie	3,285	90.60%	341	9.40%	3,626
Glasscock	331	93.24%	24	6.76%	355
Goliad	354	93.65%	24	6.35%	378
Gonzales	717	90.53%	75	9.47%	792
Gray	1,117	94.50%	65	5.50%	1,182
Grayson	7,324	89.08%	898	10.92%	8,222
Gregg	8,313	94.33%	500	5.67%	8,813
Grimes	1,152	90.64%	119	9.36%	1,271
Guadalupe	5,496	90.48%	578	9.52%	6,074
Hale	2,303	91.57%	212	8.43%	2,515
Hall	24	100%	0	0%	24
Hamilton	400	95.69%	18	4.31%	418
Hansford	1,607	87.67%	226	12.33%	1,833
Hardeman	18	94.74%	1	5.26%	19
Hardin	990	96.96%	31	3.04%	1,021
Harris	73,845	93.60%	5,053	6.40%	78,898
Harrison	2,608	95.78%	115	4.22%	2,723
Hartley	865	91.73%	78	8.27%	943
Haskell	41	100%	0	0%	41
Hays	4,109	94.18%	254	5.82%	4,363
Hemphill	909	89.38%	108	10.62%	1,017
Henderson	3,836	90.45%	405	9.55%	4,241
Hidalgo	2,205	95.58%	102	4.42%	2,307
Hill	1,230	96.62%	43	3.38%	1,273
Hockley	2,151	92.08%	185	7.92%	2,336
Hood	4,415	88.87%	553	11.13%	4,968
Hopkins	528	98.14%	10	1.86%	538
Houston	532	97.61%	13	2.39%	545
Howard	1,364	95.18%	69	4.82%	1,433
Hudspeth	5	100%	0	0%	5
Hunt	3,331	92.45%	272	7.55%	3,603
Hutchinson	3,798	88.84%	477	11.16%	4,275
Irion	118	97.52%	3	2.48%	121
Jack	96	98.97%	1	1.03%	97
Jackson	228	98.28%	4	1.72%	232
Jasper	319	99.07%	3	0.93%	322
Jeff Davis	125	92.59%	10	7.41%	135
Jefferson	4,370	96.75%	147	3.25%	4,517
Jim Hogg	9	100%	0	0%	9
Jim Wells	409	95.12%	21	4.88%	430
Johnson	6,913	92.06%	596	7.94%	7,509
Jones	202	93.52%	14	6.48%	216
Karnes	98	93.33%	7	6.67%	105
Kaufman	2,736	92.28%	229	7.72%	2,965
Kendall	3,405	89.18%	413	10.82%	3,818
Kenedy	11	100%	0	0%	11
Kent	4	100%	0	0%	4
Kerr	5,751	89.83%	651	10.17%	6,402
Kimble	603	92.48%	49	7.52%	652
King	42	100%	0	0%	42
Kinney	No votes cast				0
Kleberg	226	94.17%	14	5.83%	240
Knox	35	100%	0	0%	35
Lamar	1,282	97.71%	30	2.29%	1,312
Lamb	132	98.51%	2	1.49%	134
Lampasas	930	92.35%	77	7.65%	1,007
La Salle	1	100%	0	0%	1
Lavaca	375	95.18%	19	4.82%	394
Lee	424	97.03%	13	2.97%	437
Leon	1,014	93.54%	70	6.46%	1,084
Liberty	1,069	96.57%	38	3.43%	1,107
Limestone	458	97.86%	10	2.14%	468
Lipscomb	554	94.22%	34	5.78%	588
Live Oak	314	96.62%	11	3.38%	325
Llano	2,079	94.24%	127	5.76%	2,206
Loving	No votes cast				0
Lubbock	10,301	95.63%	471	4.37%	10,772
Lynn	17	100%	0	0%	17
Madison	372	96.88%	12	3.13%	384
Marion	68	100%	0	0%	68
Martin	671	91.92%	59	8.08%	730
Mason	855	87.51%	122	12.49%	977
Matagorda	700	91.74%	63	8.26%	763
Maverick	10	100%	0	0%	10
McCulloch	435	97.75%	10	2.25%	445
McLennan	11,265	94.87%	609	5.13%	11,874
McMullen	73	91.25%	7	8.75%	80
Medina	1,869	92.11%	160	7.89%	2,029
Menard	278	89.39%	33	10.61%	311
Midland	10,502	93.89%	684	6.11%	11,186
Milam	366	97.34%	10	2.66%	376
Mills	100	100%	0	0%	100
Mitchell	215	93.48%	15	6.52%	230
Montague	494	90.15%	54	9.85%	548
Montgomery	20,768	89.91%	2,331	10.09%	23,099
Moore	2,207	88.85%	277	11.15%	2,484
Morris	96	95.05%	5	4.95%	101
Motley	50	94.34%	3	5.66%	53
Nacogdoches	4,164	93.22%	303	6.78%	4,467
Navarro	1,104	96.50%	40	3.50%	1,144
Newton	121	99.18%	1	0.82%	122
Nolan	144	99.31%	1	0.69%	145
Nueces	5,923	96.20%	234	3.80%	6,157
Ochiltree	1,187	92.88%	91	7.12%	1,278
Oldham	83	94.32%	5	5.68%	88
Orange	1,070	96.48%	39	3.52%	1,109
Palo Pinto	332	97.36%	9	2.64%	341
Panola	433	97.52%	11	2.48%	444
Parker	6,115	89.37%	727	10.63%	6,842
Parmer	756	94.15%	47	5.85%	803
Pecos	153	100%	0	0%	153
Polk	1,413	94.14%	88	5.86%	1,501
Potter	7,231	88.62%	929	11.38%	8,160
Presidio	14	100%	0	0%	14
Rains	200	95.69%	9	4.31%	209
Randall	14,561	91.68%	1,322	8.32%	15,883
Reagan	845	86.22%	135	13.78%	980
Real	626	87.31%	91	12.69%	717
Red River	75	97.40%	2	2.60%	77
Reeves	No votes cast				0
Refugio	106	99.07%	1	0.93%	107
Roberts	158	91.33%	15	8.67%	173
Robertson	465	97.08%	14	2.92%	479
Rockwall	4,321	92.45%	353	7.55%	4,674
Runnels	258	96.63%	9	3.37%	267
Rusk	3,627	93.36%	258	6.64%	3,885
Sabine	343	95.54%	16	4.46%	359
San Augustine	117	98.32%	2	1.68%	119
San Jacinto	667	96.39%	25	3.61%	692
San Patricio	891	96.43%	33	3.57%	924
San Saba	913	89.51%	107	10.49%	1,020
Schleicher	99	96.12%	4	3.88%	103
Scurry	1,019	95.23%	51	4.77%	1,070
Shackelford	55	98.21%	1	1.79%	56
Shelby	1,289	93.00%	97	7.00%	1,386
Sherman	225	93.36%	16	6.64%	241
Smith	16,815	92.81%	1,303	7.19%	18,118
Somervell	332	95.13%	17	4.87%	349
Starr	18	100%	0	0%	18
Stephens	78	95.12%	4	4.88%	82
Sterling	331	95.94%	14	4.06%	345
Stonewall	19	100%	0	0%	19
Sutton	119	97.54%	3	2.46%	122
Swisher	262	86.75%	40	13.25%	302
Tarrant	23,601	94.28%	1,432	5.72%	25,033
Taylor	6,521	92.79%	507	7.21%	7,028
Terrell	4	100%	0	0%	4
Terry	122	97.60%	3	2.40%	125
Throckmorton	17	100%	0	0%	17
Titus	549	97.86%	12	2.14%	561
Tom Green	6,998	93.49%	487	6.51%	7,485
Travis	26,093	92.66%	2,066	7.34%	28,159
Trinity	82	98.80%	1	1.20%	83
Tyler	134	100%	0	0%	134
Upshur	1,638	95.18%	83	4.82%	1,721
Upton	No votes cast				0
Uvalde	182	94.79%	10	5.21%	192
Val Verde	612	94.44%	36	5.56%	648
Van Zandt	1,376	95.16%	70	4.84%	1,446
Victoria	2,600	95.87%	112	4.13%	2,712
Walker	3,039	90.80%	308	9.20%	3,347
Waller	2,426	82.38%	519	17.62%	2,945
Ward	48	100%	0	0%	48
Washington	2,746	93.53%	190	6.47%	2,936
Webb	788	93.14%	58	6.86%	846
Wharton	2,306	91.73%	208	8.27%	2,514
Wheeler	233	96.28%	9	3.72%	242
Wichita	2,016	96.64%	70	3.36%	2,086
Wilbarger	115	96.64%	4	3.36%	119
Willacy	28	100%	0	0%	28
Williamson	20,637	85.99%	3,361	14.01%	23,998
Wilson	656	95.21%	33	4.79%	689
Winkler	834	88.16%	112	11.84%	946
Wise	2,804	91.16%	272	8.84%	3,076
Wood	3,121	94.86%	169	5.14%	3,290
Yoakum	711	93.80%	47	6.20%	758
Young	811	94.85%	44	5.15%	855
Zapata	21	100%	0	0%	21
Zavala	14	100%	0	0%	14
Total	635,948	92.49%	51,667	7.51%	687,615

== See also ==
- 2004 Texas Democratic presidential primary
- 2004 Republican Party presidential primaries
- 2004 United States presidential election in Texas
