= Hughes Springs, Texas =

- City
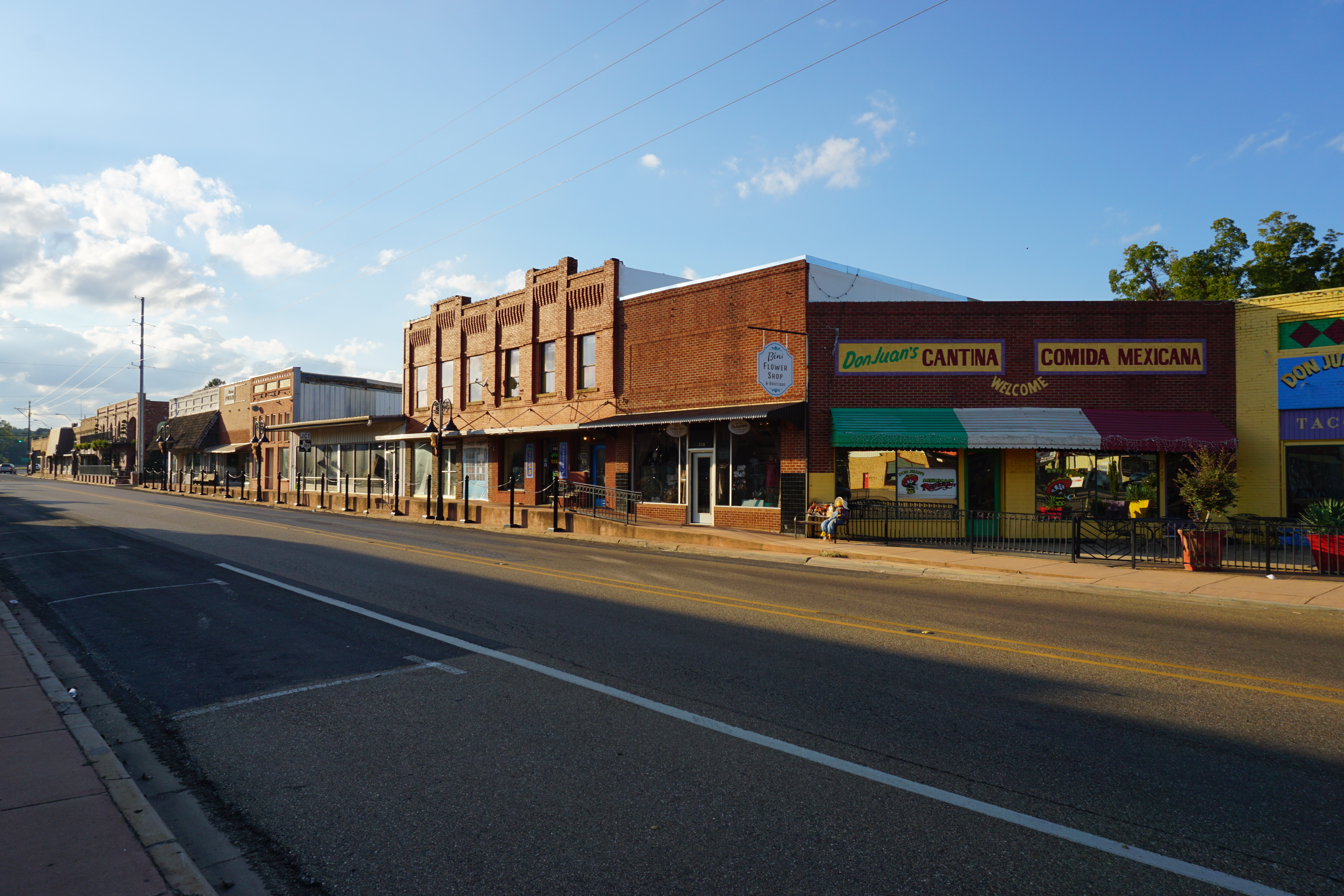
- First Street in Hughes Springs

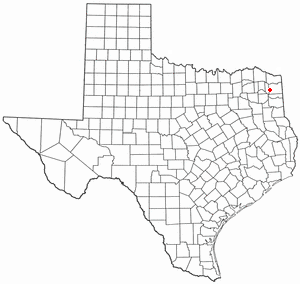
- Location of Hughes Springs, Texas

- Coordinates: 33°00′03″N 94°37′50″W
- Country: United States
- State: Texas
- Counties: Cass, Morris

Area
  - Total: 2.47 sq mi (6.39 km^{2})
  - Land: 2.47 sq mi (6.39 km^{2})
  - Water: 0 sq mi (0.00 km^{2})
- Elevation: 381 ft (116 m)

Population (2020)
  - Total: 1,575
  - Density: 638/sq mi (246/km^{2})
- Time zone: UTC-6 (Central (CST))
  - Summer (DST): UTC-5 (CDT)
- ZIP code: 75656
- Area codes: 430, 903
- FIPS code: 48-35300
- GNIS feature ID: 2410803
- Website: www.hughesspringstxusa.com

Hughes Springs city in Cass and Morris counties in the U.S. state of Texas. At the 2020 census, its population was 1,575. The town was heavily damaged by an EF2 tornado on November 4, 2022.

== Geography ==
Hughes Springs is located in western Cass County. A small portion extends west into Morris County.

The city is located along state highways 11 and 49, which run concurrently through the city limits. TX 11 leads east 15 miles (24 km) to Linden, and TX 49 leads southeast 9 miles (14 km) to Avinger. The two highways together lead west 6 miles (10 km) to Daingerfield. According to the United States Census Bureau, the city has a total area of 2.5 square miles (6.4 km^{2}), all land.

== Demographics ==
Historical population
Census	Pop.	Note	%±
1880	69		—
1890	296		329.0%
1920	831		—
1930	786		−5.4%
1940	767		−2.4%
1950	1,445		88.4%
1960	1,813		25.5%
1970	1,701		−6.2%
1980	2,196		29.1%
1990	1,938		−11.7%
2000	1,856		−4.2%
2010	1,760		−5.2%
2020	1,575		−10.5%
U.S. Decennial Census

As of the 2020 census, Hughes Springs had a population of 1,575.

=== 2020 census ===
The 2020 census counted 578 households, 422 families, and a median age of 38.4 years, with 26.5% of residents under the age of 18 and 20.6% of residents 65 years of age or older. For every 100 females there were 86.2 males, and for every 100 females age 18 and over there were 79.5 males age 18 and over.

0.0% of residents lived in urban areas, while 100.0% lived in rural areas.

There were 578 households in Hughes Springs, of which 40.0% had children under the age of 18 living in them. Of all households, 45.2% were married-couple households, 15.2% were households with a male householder and no spouse or partner present, and 34.9% were households with a female householder and no spouse or partner present. About 27.1% of all households were made up of individuals and 16.4% had someone living alone who was 65 years of age or older.

There were 721 housing units, of which 19.8% were vacant. The homeowner vacancy rate was 2.5% and the rental vacancy rate was 13.7%.

Racial composition as of the 2020 census
Race	Number	Percent
White	1,159	73.6%
Black or African American	249	15.8%
American Indian and Alaska Native	7	0.4%
Asian	5	0.3%
Native Hawaiian and Other Pacific Islander	0	0.0%
Some other race	75	4.8%
Two or more races	80	5.1%
Hispanic or Latino (of any race)	134	8.5%

=== 2000 census ===
At the 2000 census, there were 1,856 people, 777 households and 512 families residing in the city. The population density was 761.7 inhabitants per square mile (294.1/km^{2}). There were 856 housing units at an average density of 351.3 units per square mile (135.6 units/km^{2}). The racial makeup of the city was 77.10% White, 19.99% African American, 0.32% Native American, 0.05% Asian, 0.05% Pacific Islander, 1.56% from other races, and 0.92% from two or more races. Hispanic or Latino of any race were 4.15% of the population.

There were 777 households, of which 34.2% had children under the age of 18 living with them, 42.0% were married couples living together, 20.7% had a female householder with no husband present, and 34.1% were non-families. 31.7% of all households were made up of individuals, and 16.6% had someone living alone who was 65 years of age or older. The average household size was 2.34 and the average family size was 2.91.

28.5% of the population were under the age of 18, 8.9% from 18 to 24, 24.7% from 25 to 44, 18.4% from 45 to 64, and 19.5% who were 65 years of age or older. The median age was 35 years. For every 100 females, there were 80.5 males. For every 100 females age 18 and over, there were 74.1 males.

The median household income was $21,603 and the median family income was $28,333. Males had a median income of $27,813 and females $15,966. The per capita income was $14,009. About 20.2% of families and 22.8% of the population were below the poverty line, including 28.9% of those under age 18 and 15.6% of those age 65 or over.

== Education ==
The portion of Hughes Springs in Cass County - that is, the overwhelming majority of the city - is served by the Hughes Springs Independent School District. The city is home to the Hughes Springs High School Mustangs. The Mustang baseball team has been ranked in the national top 100, and several Mustang baseball players have gone on to play college baseball as well as college football and basketball.

The portion of Hughes Springs in Morris County is within the Daingerfield-Lone Star Independent School District.

== Events ==
The city was host to the area's Passion Play.

== Notable person ==
- Wright Patman, former U.S. Representative
- James and Virgina Miller, founding members of Veal Switch Baptist Church. They were married for 75 years.
