= Morris County Courthouse =

Morris County Courthouse may refer to:

- Morris County Courthouse (Kansas), Council Grove, Kansas
- Morris County Courthouse (New Jersey), Morristown, New Jersey, listed on the NRHP in Morris County, New Jersey
- Old Morris County Courthouse, Daingerfield, Texas, listed on the NRHP in Morris County, Texas
