= 2004 Texas Democratic presidential primary =

- March 9, 2004

232 Democratic National Convention delegates (195 pledged, 37 unpledged) The number of pledged delegates received is determined by the popular vote
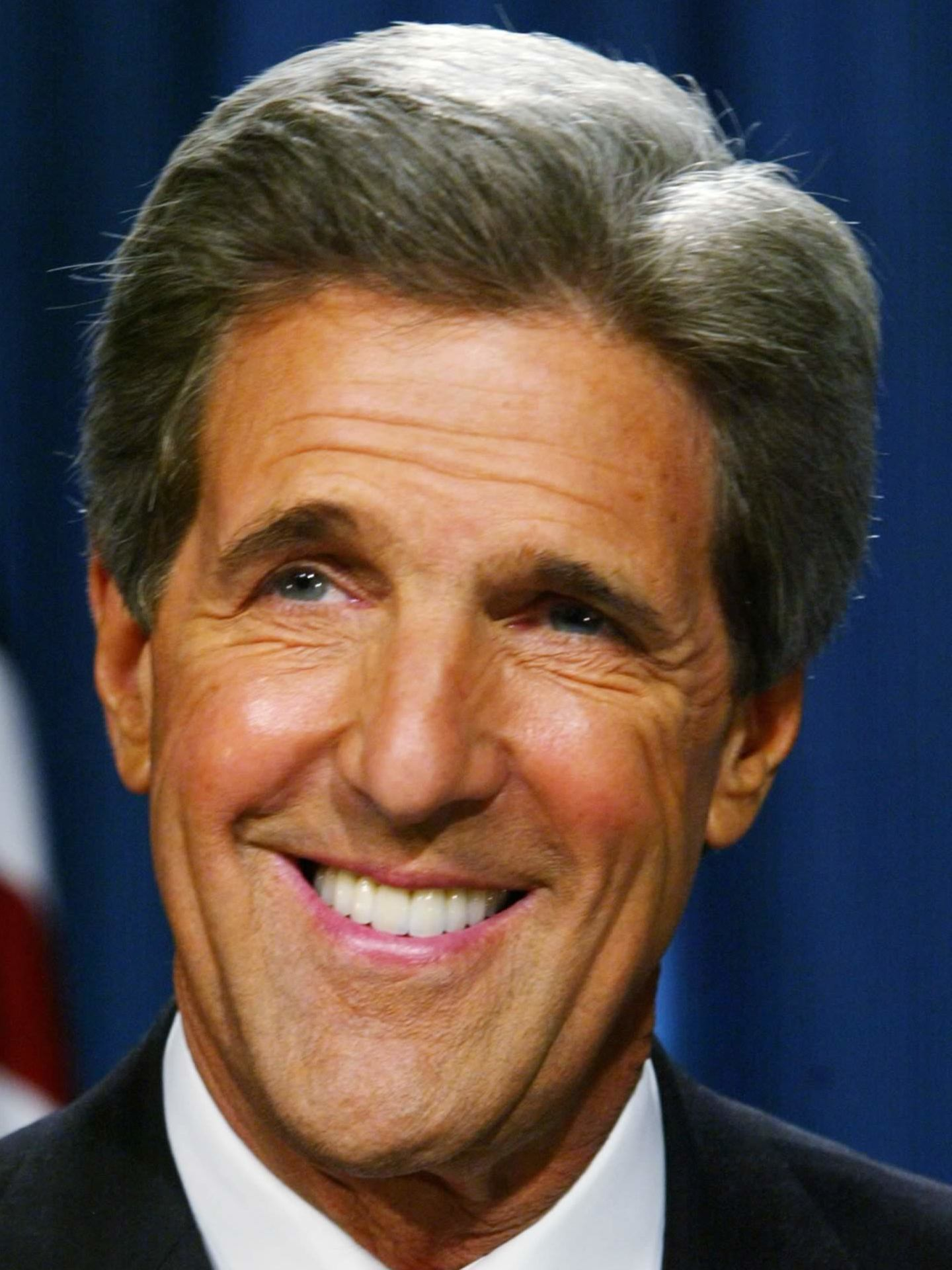

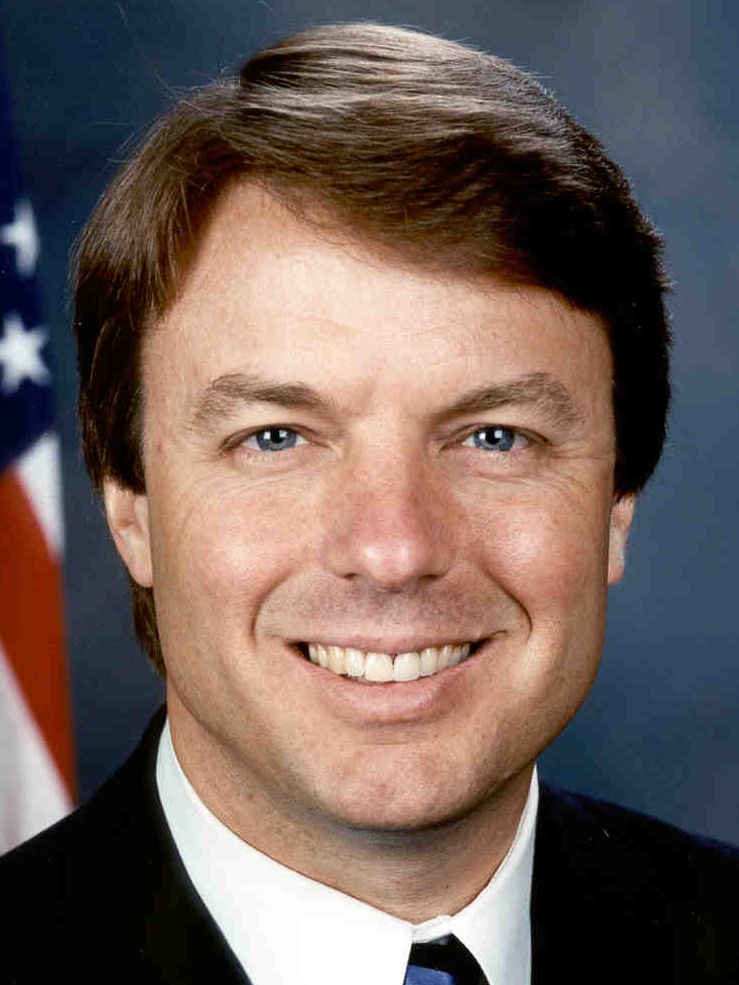
| Candidate | John Kerry | John Edwards (withdrawn) |
| Home state | Massachusetts | North Carolina |
| Delegate count | 186 | 9 |
| Popular vote | 563,237 | 120,413 |
| Percentage | 67.11% | 14.35% |
- County results Kerry: 30–35% 35–40% 40–45% 45–50% 50–55% 55–60% 60–65% 65–70% 70–75% 75–80% Edwards: 35–40% No results

A presidential primary for the Democratic Party was held in Texas in 2004 as part of the selection process for the Democratic candidate for the presidential elections that year.

== Results ==
2004 United States presidential primary election in Texas
| Party | Candidate | Votes | Percentage | Delegates | |
|---|---|---|---|---|---|
| Democratic | John Forbes Kerry | 563,237 | 67.11% | 0 | |
| Democratic | John Reid Edwards | 120,413 | 14.35% | 0 | |
| Democratic | Howard Dean | 40,035 | 4.77% | 0 | |
| Democratic | Al Sharpton | 31,020 | 3.70% | 0 | |
| Democratic | Joe Lieberman | 25,245 | 3.01% | 0 | |
| Democratic | Wesley Clark | 18,437 | 2.20% | 0 | |
| Democratic | Dennis Kucinich | 15,475 | 1.84% | 0 | |
| Democratic | Dick Gephardt | 12,160 | 1.45% | 0 | |
| Democratic | Lyndon H. LaRouche Jr. | 6,871 | 0.82% | 0 | |
| Democratic | Randy Crow | 6,338 | 0.76% | 0 | |
| 839,231 | | | 100.00% | 72 | |
| Voter turnout | | | % | | — |

== See also ==
- 2004 Texas Republican presidential primary
- 2004 Democratic Party presidential primaries
- 2004 United States presidential election in Texas
