= Welsh Reservoir =

Lake in Mount Pleasant, Texas, USA

- Interactive map of Welsh Reservoir
- Location: Mount Pleasant, Texas
- Coordinates: 33°04′34.3″N 94°50′18.5″W
- Built: 1976
- Surface area: 5.1 square kilometres (2.0 sq mi)
- Max. depth: 15 metres (49 ft)
- Surface elevation: 94 metres (308 ft)

Welsh Reservoir is a lake located south-east of Mount Pleasant, Texas. The reservoir is situated north of Cason.
