= Gordon Laro =

American football player (born 1972)

No. 40
- Position: Tight end

Personal information
- Born: April 17, 1972 (age 54); Lynn, Massachusetts, U.S.
- Listed height: 6 ft 3 in (1.91 m)
- Listed weight: 253 lb (115 kg)

Career information
- High school: Lynn English (MA)
- College: Michigan (1990); Boston College (1991–1994)
- NFL draft: 1995: undrafted

Career history
- Jacksonville Jaguars (1995); Connecticut Coyotes (1996)*
- * Offseason or practice squad member only

Career NFL statistics
- Receptions: 1
- Receiving yards: 6
- Stats at Pro Football Reference

Gordon Laro (born April 17, 1972) is an American former professional football player who was a tight end for one season with the Jacksonville Jaguars of the National Football League (NFL). Laro played college football for the Michigan Wolverines and Boston College Eagles. He was a member of the Jaguars for their inaugural season in 1995, where he appeared in two games for the team. Laro also appeared on the cover of Madden NFL '96, along with Cary Brabham of the Carolina Panthers.

== Early life ==
Laro was born on April 17, 1972, in Lynn, Massachusetts. He attended Lynn English High School and while there tried out football for the first time and won a starting role. A tight end and linebacker, he was an all-conference selection in 1988 and was named the team's best receiver after catching three touchdown passes. As a senior, Laro helped Lynn English to a record of 9–1 with a shared title of the conference championship, being named to The Item's all-star team while catching 18 passes for 259 yards and five touchdowns. He signed to play college football for the Michigan Wolverines.

== College career ==
Laro redshirted as a freshman at Michigan in 1990. Prior to the 1991 season, he left Michigan and transferred to the Boston College Eagles. His high school coach said that Laro "just wasn't happy [at Michigan]. He was homesick". He sat out the 1991 season due to transfer rules then saw playing time for the Eagles in 1992 at tight end, catching eight passes for 137 yards while also being a top blocker. Laro helped the Eagles to a regular season record of 8–2–1 with an appearance in the 1993 Hall of Fame Bowl. In 1993, he was a member of an Eagles team that went 9–3 and won the 1994 Carquest Bowl. Laro posted three catches for 21 yards. As a senior in 1994, he posted nine catches for 72 yards and a touchdown, while the Eagles went 7–4–1 with a victory in the 1994 Aloha Bowl. In his college career, he caught 20 passes for 230 yards and a touchdown.

== Professional career ==
After going unselected in the 1995 NFL draft, Laro signed with the Jacksonville Jaguars as an undrafted free agent. The Jaguars had been impressed with his blocking ability and their head coach, Tom Coughlin, had coached Laro at Boston College. Laro appeared on the cover of Madden NFL '96, being tackled by Cary Brabham of the Carolina Panthers. They are depicted in a generic action shot of the 1995 Pro Football Hall of Fame Game, an exhibition contest which was the first game in franchise history for both the Jaguars and Panthers, which were expansion teams that joined the league that year. Brabham and Laro were also wearing the same jersey number (#40). Laro made the Jaguars' opening-day roster for the 1995 season. In the Jaguars' first regular season game, a 10–3 loss to the Houston Oilers, he appeared on snaps as a fullback and caught one pass for six yards. However, he was released on September 13, 1995, after the second game of the season. The Jaguars released him as they needed to make room for another quarterback on the roster and already had several tight ends.

Laro was briefly a member of the Connecticut Coyotes of the Arena Football League in 1996 but left the team, stating that he disliked the league and felt it was unprofessional. He did not play for any other team, ending his career with two NFL games played and one catch for six yards.

== Personal life ==
Laro had two children as of 1996. He is an inductee to the Lynn Athletic Hall of Fame.
