= David Whitmore =

American football player (born 1967)

Dave Whitmore
No. 43, 41, 42
- Position: Safety

Personal information
- Born: July 6, 1967 (age 59); Daingerfield, Texas, U.S.
- Listed height: 6 ft 0 in (1.83 m)
- Listed weight: 232 lb (105 kg)

Career information
- High school: Daingerfield
- College: Stephen F. Austin
- NFL draft: 1990: 4th round, 107th overall pick

Career history
- New York Giants (1990); San Francisco 49ers (1991–1992); Kansas City Chiefs (1993–1994); Philadelphia Eagles (1995)

Awards and highlights
- Super Bowl champion (XXV)

Career NFL statistics
- Tackles: 515
- Interceptions: 2
- Forced fumbles: 17
- Stats at Pro Football Reference

David Lawrence Whitmore (born July 6, 1967) is an American former professional football player who was a safety in the National Football League (NFL) for the New York Giants, San Francisco 49ers, Kansas City Chiefs, and Philadelphia Eagles. He played college football for the Stephen F. Austin Lumberjacks and was selected by the Giants in the fourth round of the 1990 NFL draft.
