= Lone Star, Texas =

- City
- Location in Morris County and the state of Texas.
- Coordinates: 32°56′21″N 94°42′33″W
- Country: United States
- State: Texas
- County: Morris

Area
  - Total: 2.00 sq mi (5.18 km^{2})
  - Land: 1.98 sq mi (5.12 km^{2})
  - Water: 0.019 sq mi (0.05 km^{2})
- Elevation: 315 ft (96 m)

Population (2020)
  - Total: 1,400
  - Density: 710/sq mi (270/km^{2})
- Time zone: UTC-6 (Central (CST))
  - Summer (DST): UTC-5 (CDT)
- ZIP code: 75668
- Area codes: 903, 430
- FIPS code: 48-43684
- GNIS feature ID: 2410863
- Website: www.lonestartx.net

Lone Star is a city in Morris County, Texas, United States. As of the 2020 census, Lone Star had a population of 1,400.

== Geography ==
According to the United States Census Bureau, the city has a total area of 2.0 square miles (5.2 km^{2}), of which 0.50% is covered by water.

== Demographics ==
Historical population
| Census | Pop. | Note | %± |
|---|---|---|---|
| 1960 | 1,513 | | — |
| 1970 | 1,760 | | 16.3% |
| 1980 | 2,036 | | 15.7% |
| 1990 | 1,615 | | −20.7% |
| 2000 | 1,631 | | 1.0% |
| 2010 | 1,581 | | −3.1% |
| 2020 | 1,400 | | −11.4% |
U.S. Decennial Census

=== 2020 census ===
As of the 2020 census, Lone Star had a population of 1,400, and the median age was 41.3 years; 22.9% of residents were under the age of 18 and 20.5% were 65 years of age or older. For every 100 females there were 88.2 males, and for every 100 females age 18 and over there were 81.5 males age 18 and over.

0.0% of residents lived in urban areas, while 100.0% lived in rural areas.

There were 589 households in Lone Star, of which 30.2% had children under the age of 18 living in them. Of all households, 38.0% were married-couple households, 18.5% were households with a male householder and no spouse or partner present, and 36.7% were households with a female householder and no spouse or partner present. About 31.6% of all households were made up of individuals and 14.6% had someone living alone who was 65 years of age or older.

There were 719 housing units, of which 18.1% were vacant. The homeowner vacancy rate was 3.1% and the rental vacancy rate was 13.0%.

Non-Hispanic or Latino whites made up 61.14% of the population, Non-Hispanic or Latino African Americans 20.5%, Non-Hispanic or Latino Native Americans or Alaska Natives 0.57%, Non-Hispanic or Latino Asians 0.86%, Non-Hispanic or Latino Pacific Islanders 0.14%, Non-Hispanic or Latino some other race 0.21%, and Non-Hispanic or Latino mixed/multiracial residents 4.36%. (Note: Note: the US Census treats Hispanic/Latino as an ethnic category. This breakdown excludes Latinos from the racial categories and assigns them to a separate category. Hispanics/Latinos can be of any race.)

Racial composition as of the 2020 census
| Race | Number | Percent |
|---|---|---|
| White | 887 | 63.4% |
| Black or African American | 291 | 20.8% |
| American Indian and Alaska Native | 10 | 0.7% |
| Asian | 13 | 0.9% |
| Native Hawaiian and Other Pacific Islander | 2 | 0.1% |
| Some other race | 86 | 6.1% |
| Two or more races | 111 | 7.9% |
| Hispanic or Latino (of any race) | 171 | 12.2% |

== Education ==
Most of the city of Lone Star is served by the Daingerfield-Lone Star Independent School District. A small portion are instead zoned to schools in the Hughes Springs ISD.

Daingerfield High School is the public high school of the former school district.

Lone Star Elementary, of Daingerfield-Lone Star ISD, closed in 2010.
