= Madden NFL '96 =

1995 American football video game

- Developers: High Score Productions (Genesis); Tiburon Entertainment (SNES)
- Publisher: EA Sports
- Composer: Tommy Tallarico
- Series: Madden NFL
- Platforms: Genesis, Super NES, Game Boy, Game Gear, DOS
- Release: NA: November 10, 1995; EU: 1995
- Genre: Sports
- Modes: Single player, multiplayer

Madden NFL '96 is a football video game designed for the 1995 NFL season, licensed by the NFL. Publisher EA Sports intended for it to be the first licensed NFL game for the PlayStation, but the PlayStation version was delayed and ultimately cancelled, with the game being published only for previous-generation consoles, PCs, and handhelds. Compared to previous Madden NFL games, the AI has been boosted and can now hurry in two-minute drill situations, spike the ball, and cover the receivers with better efficiency. The handheld versions did not have NFL licensing, so the NFL was removed from the title, and they were released as Madden 96. In addition to the 16-bit console and portable versions, a DOS version was also released under the title of Madden NFL Football: Limited Edition in 1996.

The game was well received by critics, with the improved A.I. garnering the most praise. It was the last to explicitly be endorsed by the NFL on Fox, although a 16-bit rendition of the NFL on Fox theme by Scott Schreer would continue to be used in Madden for several years afterward.

Cary Brabham of the Carolina Panthers and Gordon Laro of the Jacksonville Jaguars are featured on the cover. They are depicted in a generic action shot of the 1995 Pro Football Hall of Fame Game, an exhibition contest which was the first game in franchise history for both expansion teams. Brabham and Laro were also wearing the same jersey number (#40).

== Gameplay ==
The Create a Player feature is added, which includes position-specific mini-games that determine the ability of the player.

The game is the first in the Madden series to include secret "classic" teams. Each time a player wins Super Bowl XXX, the victory screen reveals a code for the winning team, such as BYBYLA for the recently relocated Oakland Raiders. Having both debuted in 1995, the Jacksonville Jaguars unlock an All-Madden super squad, and the Carolina Panthers unlock a playable NFLPA team made up of free agents and user created players. Each of the established 28 teams unlock the lineup from their historical best season, ranging from the 1960 Philadelphia Eagles to the 1986 New York Giants. The classic teams have golden logos, historical stadiums, but the rosters consist of jersey numbers only, no names.

== Cancelled PlayStation version ==
Madden '96, developed by Visual Concepts, was originally planned to be the first NFL game on the PlayStation shortly after the console's launch in 1995. The programmers based the code on the 3DO game John Madden Football, rather than the Genesis Madden NFL games, because John Madden Football was written in C, the default programming language of the PlayStation. Features were to include customizable playbooks, penalties, weather conditions, and playing surfaces, and commentary from John Madden, Pat Summerall, James Brown, and Lesley Visser. But after several delays, the game was canceled because it did not meet EA's quality assurance standards.

Though EA announced a delay from the fourth quarter of 1995 to the third quarter of 1996 for the game's release, executive producer Scott Orr says he made the final decision to cancel the PlayStation version because it had become clear that it would not be ready in time for the 1995 Christmas shopping season. He judged that Christmas was crucial enough to football video games that Madden NFL '96 would have no chance in the market if it missed the season. Reasons the development team were not able to make the original deadline included a lack of familiarity with the PlayStation hardware, initially mediocre technical support from Sony, and the short time frame allowed for development (8-9 months). A member of the PlayStation version's development team, speaking under condition of anonymity, commented, "Part of the problem was that we were trying to do too many new things for the first time. We'd never done a 3D game before. We'd just purchased our first copy of Alias. We'd never done a CD product before. We'd never programmed in C before."

The cancellation of the PlayStation version was seen as a major blow to the Madden NFL series right as it was being confronted by the first serious challenger to its dominance in years, the NFL GameDay series. Nonetheless Bing Gordon, executive vice president of marketing for Electronic Arts, said cancelling the game rather than shipping a product EA could not be proud of was the right decision, and argued that decision was vindicated by the massive success of Madden NFL 97.

The video sequences starring Madden and Summerall were repurposed for Madden NFL 97. Visual Concepts would go on to make the NFL 2K series of games.

Years after the PlayStation version's cancellation, a playable early development build of the game leaked onto the internet.

== Reception ==
The two sports reviewers of Electronic Gaming Monthly gave the Genesis version scores of 9.5 and 9.0 out of 10, stating that "EA listened to players and has come up with the best 16-bit football game ever made." They praised the "hard as hell" AI and the addition of speed bursts. A reviewer for Next Generation deemed it "a definite improvement from last year's poor effort", citing the more solid player graphics, faster play, and tougher AI. He further remarked that while Sega's Prime Time NFL was still the best football video game in single player, Madden NFL '96 was the best two-player experience. He gave it four out of five stars. GamePro found the AI a somewhat mixed blessing, remarking that "The mean and nasty A.I. will answer the prayers of hardcore Madden players, but it will surely frustrate rookies and bandwagon fans." They also deemed the new Scouting Combine feature "an excellent idea that could nonetheless use some tinkering." However, they praised the rendered character sprites, the widened camera views, and the new moves, and gave the game a recommendation. They judged the SNES version to be superior to the Genesis version due to its faster animation and inclusion of drills specific to each position, and called it "the top-ranked SNES football cart".

GamePro panned the Game Boy version in a brief review, stating, "This Madden features no NFL license, old lineups, and none of the improvements made to the '96 SNES version. The small sprites will cause eye strain, player control is difficult, and passes sound like bombs falling from the sky." They made many of the same criticisms of the Game Gear version, which they noted had better control but was still "a below-average attempt to bring football into the handheld arena."
