= Daingerfield High School =

Public school in Daingerfield, Texas, U.S.

Location
- 202 Tiger Drive; Daingerfield, Texas 75638-0851; United States; 33.014159°N 94.718033°W

Information
- School type: Public High School
- School district: Daingerfield-Lone Star Independent School District
- Principal: Bobby Betts
- Teaching staff: 35.48 (on an FTE basis)
- Grades: 9-12
- Enrollment: 343 (2024–2025)
- Student to teacher ratio: 9.67
- Colors: Royal blue and white
- Athletics conference: UIL Class 3A
- Mascot: Tiger
- Website: Daingerfield High School

Daingerfield High School is 3A public high school located in Daingerfield, Texas, United States. It is part of the Daingerfield-Lone Star Independent School District located in central Morris County. In 2011, the school was rated "Academically Acceptable" by the Texas Education Agency.

The boundaries of the school district, which are the high school's attendance boundary, include Daingerfield and most of Lone Star.

== Athletics ==
The Daingerfield Tigers compete in the following sports:

- Baseball
- Basketball
- Cross country
- Football
- Golf
- Powerlifting
- Softball
- Tennis
- Track and field
- Volleyball

=== Football ===
The 1983 team holds the NFHS national record for most shutouts in a single season and considered the most dominant in Texas history. The team scored 631 points while allowing only 8 the entire season, (the only points scored by an opposing team were a touchdown on a pass play to Carthage and a safety to Kilgore, both 4A schools). Of the 16 games won (the first Texas high school to win 16 games in a season), 14 were shutouts (which ranks as the #1 national 11 man football single season record, as recorded on NFHS.org) including the final 13 (the final seven of the regular season and all six playoff games, the only team in Texas high school football history to accomplish the latter feat). The 50th Anniversary Edition of Dave Campbell's Texas Football nominated the 1983 team as the #2 most memorable team (pro, college, or high school) in Texas football history; only the 1969 Texas Longhorn national championship team was rated higher.

=== State titles ===
Daingerfield (UIL)

- Boys basketball
  - 1977(3A)
- Football
  - 1968(2A), 1983(3A), 1985(3A), 2008(2A/D1), 2009(2A/D1), 2010(2A/D1)
- Boys golf
  - 1969(2A)
- Boys track
  - 1963(2A), 1984(3A), 1995(3A), 2010(2A)
- Girls track
  - 1990(3A)

Daingerfield Rhoads (PVIL)

- Boys basketball
  - 1964(PVIL-2A)

==== State finalists ====
Daingerfield (UIL)

- Football –
  - 1984(3A), 1998(3A/D2), 2012 (2A/D1)

Daingerfield Rhoads (PVIL)

- Boys basketball -
  - 1955(PVIL-1A), 1956(PVIL-1A), 1961(PVIL-2A)

== Notable alumni ==
- Greg Evans – American football player
- Eric Everett – American football player
- Thomas Everett – American football player
- Keyarris Garrett – American and Canadian Football player
- Darryl Lewis – American football player
- David Mims II — American football player
- Denzel Mims – American football player
- John Rodgers – American football player
- David Whitmore – American football player
