= Hughes Springs Independent School District =

School district in Texas

Hughes Springs Independent School District is a public school district located in Hughes Springs, Texas (USA).

Located in Cass County, a small portion of the district extends into Morris County, including some of the city of Lone Star.

In 2009, the school district was rated "academically acceptable" by the Texas Education Agency.

== Schools ==
- Hughes Springs High School (Grades 9-12)
- Hughes Springs Junior High School (Grades 6-8)
- Hughes Springs ElementarySchool (Grades PK-5)
  - 2000-01 National Blue Ribbon School
