= Gary Lewis (tight end) =

American football player (born 1958)

No. 81
- Position: Tight end

Personal information
- Born: December 30, 1958 (age 67); Mount Pleasant, Texas, U.S.
- Listed height: 6 ft 5 in (1.96 m)
- Listed weight: 234 lb (106 kg)

Career information
- High school: Daingerfield (TX)
- College: Texas–Arlington
- NFL draft: 1981: 2nd round, 35th overall pick

Career history
- Green Bay Packers (1981–1984)

Career NFL statistics
- Receptions: 21
- Receiving yards: 285
- Receiving touchdowns: 1
- Stats at Pro Football Reference

Gary Wayne Lewis (born December 30, 1958) is an American former professional football player who was a tight end in the National Football League (NFL). Lewis was selected in the second round by the Green Bay Packers out of the University of Texas at Arlington in the 1981 NFL draft. He played high school football at Dangerfield. Gary is happily married to the long time love of his life, Michelle Roberson Lewis. Lewis's brother, Darryl, also played in the NFL.
