= Hughes Springs High School =

Location
- 701 Russell Street; Hughes Springs, Texas 75656; United States; 33.0054°N 94.6363°W

Information
- School type: Public high school
- School district: Hughes Springs Independent School District
- Principal: Brian Nation
- Teaching staff: 37.49 (FTE)
- Grades: 9-12
- Enrollment: 331 (2023–2024)
- Student to teacher ratio: 8.83
- Colors: Red, black & white
- Athletics conference: UIL Class AAA
- Mascot: Mustang
- Website: Hughes Springs High School

Hughes Springs High School is a public high school located in Hughes Springs, Texas (USA). It is classified as a 3A school by the UIL. The school is part of the Hughes Springs Independent School District located in southwestern Cass County. For the 2021-2022 school year, the school was rated "A" by the Texas Education Agency.

== Athletics ==
The Hughes Springs Mustangs compete in the following sports:

- American football
- Baseball
- Basketball
- Cross country
- Golf
- Powerlifting
- Softball
- Tennis
- Track and field
- Volleyball

=== State Titles ===
- Boys' basketball
  - 1971 (2A)
- Girls' basketball
  - 1999 (2A)

==== State Finalists ====
- Softball
  - 2018 (3A)
