= Darryl Lewis =

American football player (born 1961)

No. 88
- Position: Tight end

Personal information
- Born: April 16, 1961 (age 65); Mount Pleasant, Texas, U.S.
- Listed height: 6 ft 6 in (1.98 m)
- Listed weight: 232 lb (105 kg)

Career information
- High school: Daingerfield (Daingerfield, Texas)
- College: Texas–Arlington
- NFL draft: 1983: 5th round, 128th overall pick

Career history
- New England Patriots (1983)*; Cleveland Browns (1984)
- * Offseason or practice squad member only
- Stats at Pro Football Reference

Darryl Gerard Lewis (born April 16, 1961) is an American former professional football tight end who played one season with the Cleveland Browns of the National Football League (NFL). He was selected 128th overall by the New England Patriots in the fifth round of the 1983 NFL draft. He played college football at the University of Texas at Arlington and attended Daingerfield High School in Daingerfield, Texas. Lewis's brother, Gary, also played in the NFL.
