= Morris County, Texas =

County in Texas, United States

- County
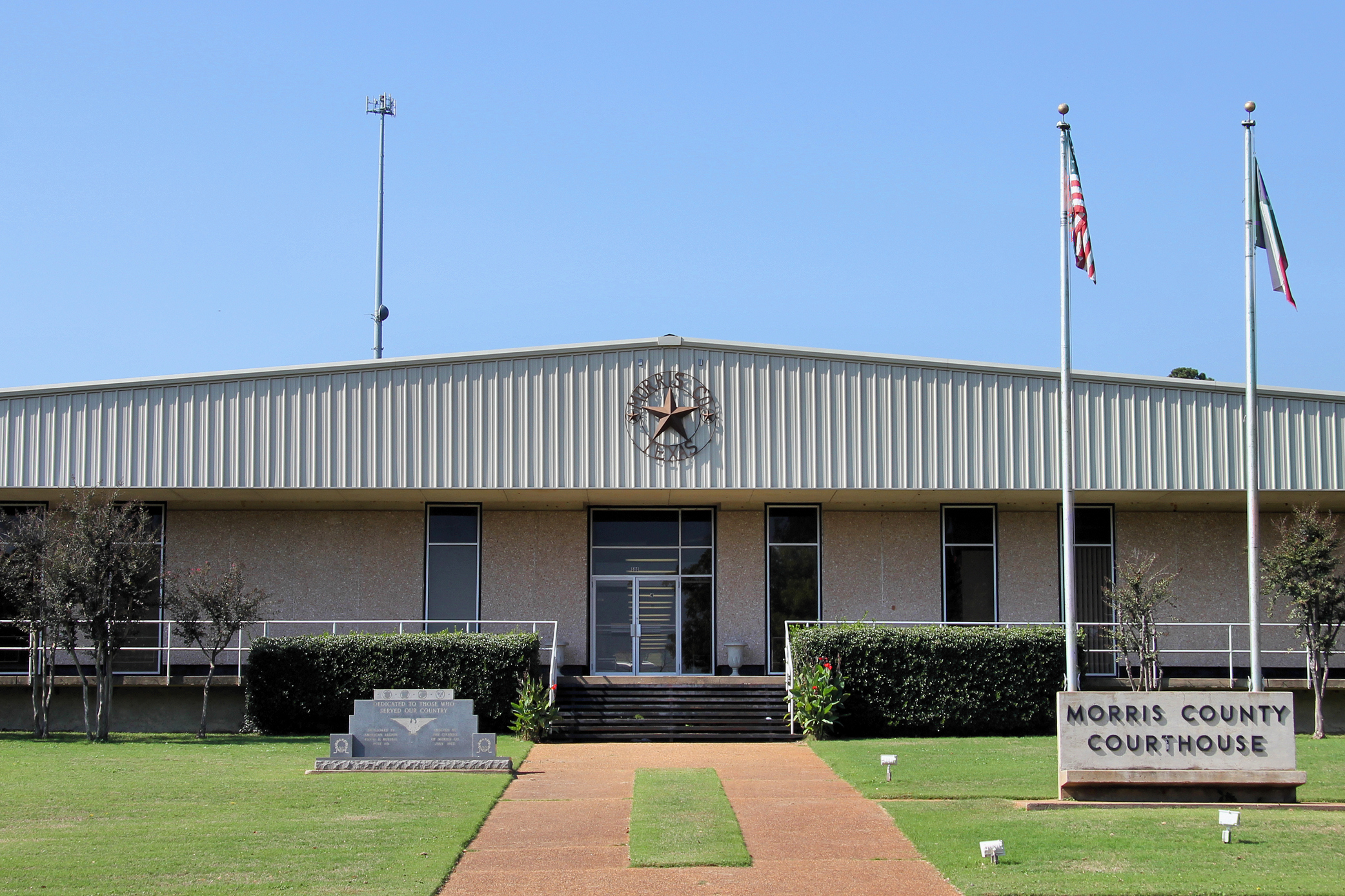
- The Morris County Courthouse in Daingerfield

- Location within the U.S. state of Texas
- Coordinates: 33°07′N 94°44′W
- Country: United States
- State: Texas
- Founded: 1875
- Seat: Daingerfield
- Largest city: Daingerfield

Area
  - Total: 259 sq mi (670 km^{2})
  - Land: 252 sq mi (650 km^{2})
  - Water: 6.7 sq mi (17 km^{2}) 2.6%

Population (2020)
  - Total: 11,973
  - Estimate (2025): 12,133 ▲
  - Density: 47.5/sq mi (18.3/km^{2})
- Time zone: UTC−6 (Central)
  - Summer (DST): UTC−5 (CDT)
- Congressional district: 1st
- Website: www.co.morris.tx.us

Morris County is a county located near the eastern border of the U.S. state of Texas. As of the 2020 census, its population was 11,973. Its county seat is Daingerfield. Morris County is probably named for William Wright Morris, an early judge and planter from Henderson, also in northeast Texas. As of 2016, Morris County is no longer one of six entirely dry, prohibition counties in the state of Texas. Morris County is "partially wet."

== Geography ==
According to the U.S. Census Bureau, the county has a total area of 259 square miles (670 km^{2}), of which 6.7 square miles (17 km^{2}), 2.6%, are covered by water. It is the fifth-smallest county in Texas by land area and fourth-smallest by total area.

=== Major highways ===
- I-30
- US 67
- US 259
- SH 11
- SH 49
- SH 77
- SH 338
- Loop 284
- FM 130
- FM 144
- FM 161
- FM 250

=== Adjacent counties ===
- Bowie County (north)
- Cass County (east)
- Marion County (southeast)
- Upshur County (south)
- Camp County (southwest)
- Titus County (west)
- Red River County (northwest)

== Communities ==
=== Cities ===
- Daingerfield (county seat)
- Hughes Springs (mostly in Cass County)
- Lone Star
- Omaha

=== Town ===
- Naples

=== Unincorporated community ===
- Cason
- Jenkins

== Government ==
A single room was first used as a courthouse. In 1882, a new courthouse was built for $5,500. On July 19, 1971, a groundbreaking occurred for a replacement courthouse, scheduled to open in 1972.

== Demographics ==
Historical population
Census	Pop.	Note	%±
1880	5,032		—
1890	6,580		30.8%
1900	8,220		24.9%
1910	10,439		27.0%
1920	10,289		−1.4%
1930	10,028		−2.5%
1940	9,810		−2.2%
1950	9,433		−3.8%
1960	12,576		33.3%
1970	12,310		−2.1%
1980	14,629		18.8%
1990	13,200		−9.8%
2000	13,048		−1.2%
2010	12,934		−0.9%
2020	11,973		−7.4%
2025 (est.)	12,133	▲	1.3%
U.S. Decennial Census; 1850–2010 2010–2020

=== Racial and ethnic composition ===
Morris County, Texas – Racial and ethnic composition Note: the US Census treats Hispanic/Latino as an ethnic category. This table excludes Latinos from the racial categories and assigns them to a separate category. Hispanics/Latinos may be of any race.
Race / Ethnicity (NH = Non-Hispanic)	Pop 1980	Pop 1990	Pop 2000	Pop 2010	Pop 2020	% 1980	% 1990	% 2000	% 2010	% 2020
White alone (NH)	11,154	9,660	9,217	8,636	7,716	76.25%	73.18%	70.64%	66.77%	64.45%
Black or African American alone (NH)	3,143	3,220	3,137	2,952	2,448	21.48%	24.39%	24.04%	22.82%	20.45%
Native American or Alaska Native alone (NH)	54	69	62	82	70	0.37%	0.52%	0.48%	0.63%	0.58%
Asian alone (NH)	18	11	23	43	35	0.12%	0.08%	0.18%	0.33%	0.29%
Native Hawaiian or Pacific Islander alone (NH)	x	x	8	3	9	x	x	0.06%	0.02%	0.08%
Other race alone (NH)	13	1	6	7	30	0.09%	0.01%	0.05%	0.05%	0.25%
Multiracial (NH)	x	x	118	208	483	x	x	0.90%	1.61%	4.03%
Hispanic or Latino (any race)	247	239	477	1,003	1,182	1.69%	1.81%	3.66%	7.75%	9.87%
Total	14,629	13,200	13,048	12,934	11,973	100.00%	100.00%	100.00%	100.00%	100.00%

=== 2020 census ===
As of the 2020 census, the county had a population of 11,973. The median age was 44.7 years; 22.3% of the residents were under 18 and 22.6% were 65 or older. The female/male ratio wa 1:0.931 overall ans 1:0.895 for 18 and over.

The racial makeup of the county was 67.2% White, 20.6% Black or African American, 0.7% American Indian and Alaska Native, 0.4% Asian, 0.1% Native Hawaiian and Pacific Islander, 3.8% from some other race, and 7.2% from two or more races. Hispanic or Latino residents of any race comprised 9.9% of the population.

Less than 0.1% of residents lived in urban areas, while almost 100.0% lived in rural areas.

Of the 4,963 households in the county, 28.1% had children under 18 living in them, 45.0% were married-couple households, 18.5% were households with a male householder and no spouse or partner present, and 31.6% were households with a female householder and no spouse or partner present. About 30.0% of all households were made up of individuals, and 15.2% had someone living alone who was 65 or older.

The county had 5,789 housing units, of which 14.3% were vacant. Among occupied housing units, 71.4% were owner-occupied and 28.6% were renter-occupied. The homeowner vacancy rate was 1.8% and the rental vacancy rate was 11.3%.

=== 2000 census ===
As of the 2000 census, 13,048 people, 5,215 households, and 3,749 families were residing in the county. The population density was 51 people per square mile (20 people/km^{2}). The 6,017 housing units had an average density of 24 units per square mile (9.3/km^{2}). In 2000, the racial makeup of the county was 71.71% White, 24.13% African American, 0.53% Native American, 0.18% Asian, 0.06% Pacific Islander, 2.28% from other races, and 1.12% from two or more races; 3.66% of the population were Hispanics or Latinos of any race.

Of the 5,215 households, 29.5% had children under 18 living with them, 53.9% were married couples living together, 14.1% had a female householder with no husband present, and 28.1% were not families. About 25.8% of all households were made up of individuals, and 13.2% had someone living alone who was 65 or older. The average household size was 2.47, and the average family size was 2.95.

In the county, the age distribution was 25.2% under 18, 7.8% from 18 to 24, 24.3% from 25 to 44, 24.5% from 45 to 64, and 18.3% who were 65 or older. The median age was 40 years. The female/male ratio was 1:0.927 overall and 1:0.874 for 18 and over.

The median income in the county for a household was $29,011 and for a family was $35,326. Males had a median income of $30,917 versus $20,270 for females. The per capita income for the county was $15,612. About 14.9% of families and 18.3% of the population were below the poverty line, including 25.4% of those under 18 and 12.9% of those 65 or over.

== Education ==
These school districts serve Morris County:

- Daingerfield-Lone Star ISD (small portion in Titus County)
- Hughes Springs ISD (mostly in Cass County)
- Pewitt CISD (small portions in Titus and Cass counties)

Morris County is also served by the Northeast Texas Community College, whose main campus is in southeastern Titus County, but it has a small satellite campus in Naples.

== Politics ==
Morris County was a longtime Democratic stronghold, like many rural Southern counties were in the Jim Crow and immediate post-Jim Crow eras. (It only voted for a Republican in 1972.) The 2000 election was the last time the county voted in favor of a Democratic presidential nominee.

Morris County is located within District 1 of the Texas House of Representatives. Morris County is located within District 1 of the Texas Senate.

United States presidential election results for Morris County, Texas
Year	Republican		Democratic		Third party(ies)	
Year	No.	%	No.	%	No.	%
1912	89	25.72%	191	55.20%	66	19.08%
1916	163	15.28%	689	64.57%	215	20.15%
1920	164	18.06%	669	73.68%	75	8.26%
1928	287	26.90%	780	73.10%	0	0.00%
1932	38	2.94%	1,253	97.06%	0	0.00%
1936	52	4.09%	1,220	95.91%	0	0.00%
1940	82	4.47%	1,752	95.53%	0	0.00%
1944	122	8.27%	1,269	85.98%	85	5.76%
1948	143	9.19%	1,164	74.81%	249	16.00%
1952	890	34.06%	1,722	65.90%	1	0.04%
1956	1,463	47.58%	1,592	51.77%	20	0.65%
1960	1,569	44.27%	1,952	55.08%	23	0.65%
1964	1,218	33.89%	2,366	65.83%	10	0.28%
1968	1,064	26.03%	1,701	41.61%	1,323	32.36%
1972	2,699	69.47%	1,162	29.91%	24	0.62%
1976	1,843	37.38%	3,071	62.28%	17	0.34%
1980	2,133	40.40%	3,105	58.81%	42	0.80%
1984	2,778	48.51%	2,925	51.07%	24	0.42%
1988	2,104	37.37%	3,522	62.56%	4	0.07%
1992	1,400	25.14%	3,028	54.37%	1,141	20.49%
1996	1,449	30.01%	2,973	61.58%	406	8.41%
2000	2,381	48.70%	2,455	50.21%	53	1.08%
2004	2,818	53.39%	2,437	46.17%	23	0.44%
2008	3,158	60.18%	2,055	39.16%	35	0.67%
2012	3,232	62.89%	1,858	36.15%	49	0.95%
2016	3,446	69.29%	1,425	28.65%	102	2.05%
2020	3,872	69.30%	1,669	29.87%	46	0.82%
2024	4,092	75.30%	1,312	24.14%	30	0.55%

United States Senate election results for Morris County, Texas1
Year	Republican		Democratic		Third party(ies)	
Year	No.	%	No.	%	No.	%
2024	3,958	73.42%	1,353	25.10%	80	1.48%

United States Senate election results for Morris County, Texas2
Year	Republican		Democratic		Third party(ies)	
Year	No.	%	No.	%	No.	%
2020	3,753	68.47%	1,639	29.90%	89	1.62%

Texas Gubernatorial election results for Morris County
Year	Republican		Democratic		Third party(ies)	
Year	No.	%	No.	%	No.	%
2022	3,041	76.10%	921	23.05%	34	0.85%

== See also ==
- Dry counties
- National Register of Historic Places listings in Morris County, Texas
- Recorded Texas Historic Landmarks in Morris County
