= Daingerfield-Lone Star Independent School District =

School district in Texas

Location
- Daingerfield, TX ESC Region 8 Daingerfield, Morris County, Texas, 75638; USA

District information
- Type: Public
- Motto: Preparing Students For Life
- Grades: Pre-K through 12
- Superintendent: Sandra Quarles

Students and staff
- Athletic conference: UIL Class AAA

Other information
- Mascot: Bengal Tiger
- Website: Daingerfield-Lone Star ISD

Daingerfield-Lone Star Independent School District (DLSISD) is a public school district based in Daingerfield, Texas (USA).

Located in Morris County, where it includes Daingerfield and most of Lone Star, a small portion of the district extends into Titus County.

This small district obtains its name from the two towns which, at one time, held at least one school. Lone Star Elementary was a small addition to the remaining four schools that now make up the entire district.

The building in Lone Star was shut down in 2010, forcing all of the students to attend either West or South Elementary.

In 2009, the school district was rated "academically acceptable" by the Texas Education Agency.

== History ==
Daingerfield ISD took over areas of the Sycamore Common School District, which closed in 1951; these areas had the entirety of the white student body of the Sycamore CSD, and some of the black students.

In 1961 it had over 1,500 students. At the time the football stadium had a recent renovation.

In 1968, the district took a portion of the Cason Independent School District which had the remainder of the white students of that district.

Circa 1970, the vast majority of the students were non-Hispanic White.

In 1971 a school bond program was enacted, worth exceeding $1,350,000. In January 1972 the Marshall News Messenger reported that the building projects were "mostly completed".

In 1986 enrollment was 2,115. More than half were given lunches that were priced at a lower or at no cost, a mark of poverty.

In 2010, Lone Star Elementary shut down and all students went to West and South Elementary. Any teachers who worked at Lone Star Elementary were offered jobs to work at Daingerfield ISD.

== Schools ==
The district has four schools, all located in Daingerfield:

- Daingerfield High School (Daingerfield; Grades 9–12)
- Daingerfield Junior High (Daingerfield; Grades 6–8)
- South Elementary (Daingerfield; Grades 3–5)
- West Elementary (Daingerfield; Grades PK-2)

The district formerly operated Lone Star Elementary (Grades PK-5) in Lone Star, until 2010; however, due to declining enrollment the school was closed. The district considered donating the school property to the Lone Star municipal government.
