= Daingerfield, Texas =

- City
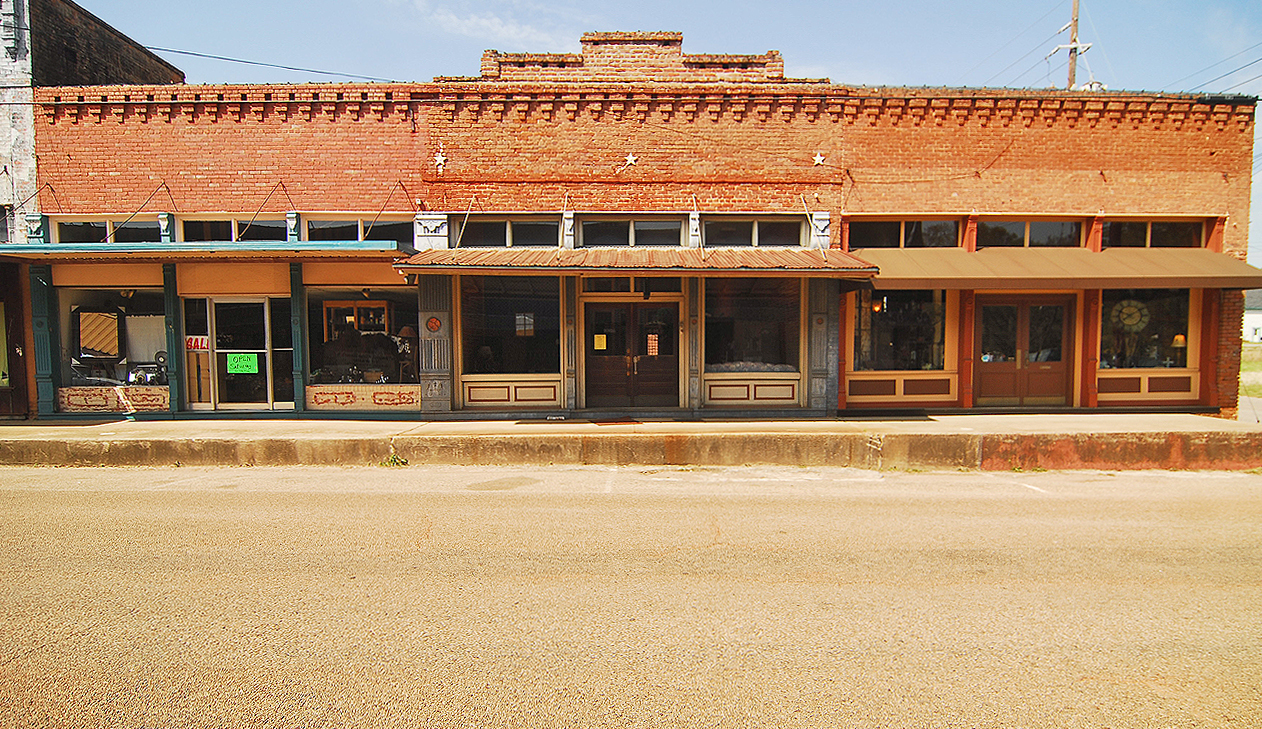
- Part of the historic downtown

- Location in Morris County and the state of Texas.
- Coordinates: 33°01′50″N 94°43′30″W
- Country: United States
- State: Texas
- County: Morris

Area
  - Total: 2.46 sq mi (6.37 km^{2})
  - Land: 2.46 sq mi (6.36 km^{2})
  - Water: 0.0039 sq mi (0.01 km^{2})
- Elevation: 394 ft (120 m)

Population (2020)
  - Total: 2,522
  - Density: 1,030/sq mi (397/km^{2})
- Time zone: UTC-6 (Central (CST))
  - Summer (DST): UTC-5 (CDT)
- ZIP code: 75638
- Area codes: 903, 430
- FIPS code: 48-18464
- GNIS feature ID: 2410284
- Website: www.cityofdaingerfield.com

Daingerfield is a city in and the county seat of Morris County, Texas, United States. As of the 2020 census, Daingerfield had a population of 2,522.

The bluegrass instrumental tune Old Dangerfield by Bill Monroe was named after the town of Daingerfield.

== Geography ==
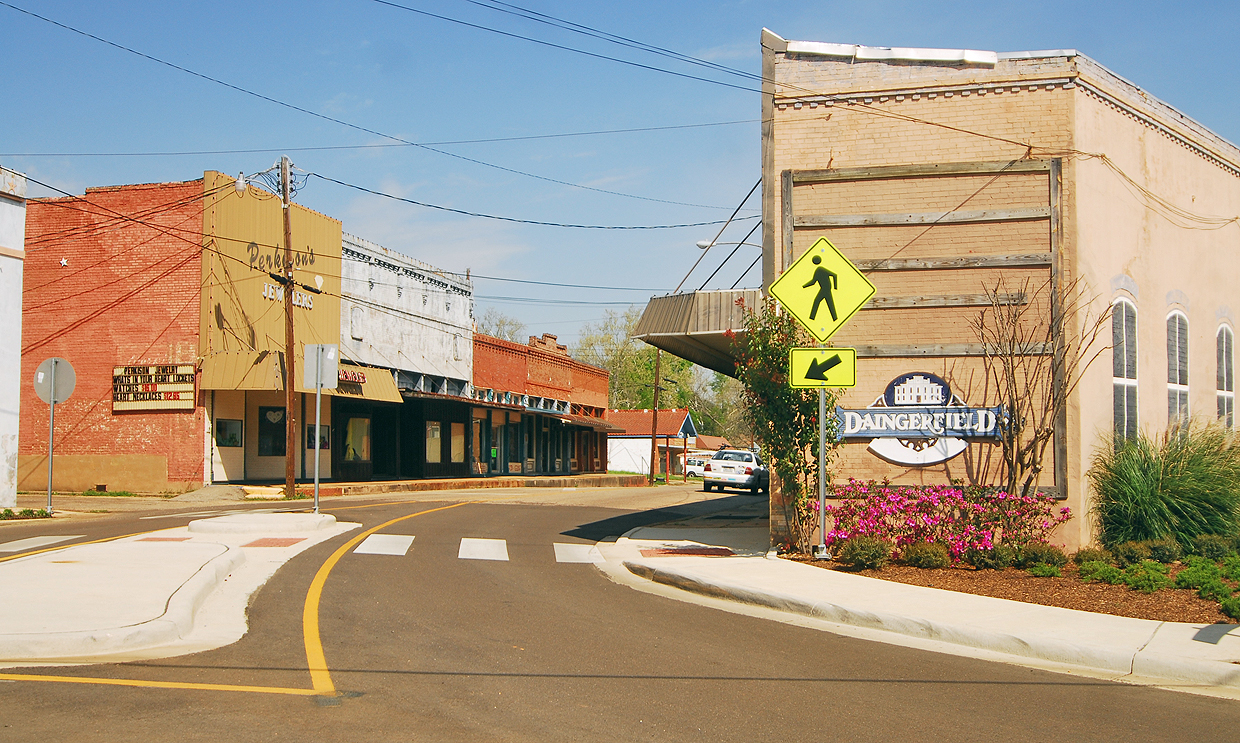
Historic downtown Daingerfield

According to the United States Census Bureau, the town has a total area of 2.4 square miles (6.2 km^{2}), all land.

== Demographics ==
Historical population
Census	Pop.	Note	%±
1870	272		—
1880	395		45.2%
1890	553		40.0%
1920	843		—
1930	818		−3.0%
1940	1,032		26.2%
1950	1,668		61.6%
1960	3,133		87.8%
1970	2,630		−16.1%
1980	3,030		15.2%
1990	2,572		−15.1%
2000	2,517		−2.1%
2010	2,560		1.7%
2020	2,522		−1.5%
U.S. Decennial Census

=== 2020 census ===
As of the 2020 census, Daingerfield had a population of 2,522. The median age was 36.6 years, with 27.6% of residents under the age of 18 and 16.9% of residents 65 years of age or older. For every 100 females there were 86.1 males, and for every 100 females age 18 and over there were 83.0 males.

0.0% of residents lived in urban areas, while 100.0% lived in rural areas.

There were 949 households in Daingerfield, of which 35.9% had children under the age of 18 living in them. Of all households, 37.2% were married-couple households, 17.4% were households with a male householder and no spouse or partner present, and 40.1% were households with a female householder and no spouse or partner present. About 28.2% of all households were made up of individuals and 11.7% had someone living alone who was 65 years of age or older.

There were 1,081 housing units, of which 12.2% were vacant. The homeowner vacancy rate was 2.5% and the rental vacancy rate was 12.4%.

Racial composition as of the 2020 census
Race	Number	Percent
White	1,347	53.4%
Black or African American	798	31.6%
American Indian and Alaska Native	20	0.8%
Asian	6	0.2%
Native Hawaiian and Other Pacific Islander	1	0.0%
Some other race	115	4.6%
Two or more races	235	9.3%
Hispanic or Latino (of any race)	374	14.8%

== Education ==
Daingerfield-Lone Star Independent School District is a school district based in Daingerfield. Located in Morris County, a small portion of the district extends into Titus County. The district has four schools in Daingerfield, including Daingerfield High School.

The school district was rated "Academically Acceptable" in 2009 by the Texas Education Agency.

== See also ==
- First Baptist Church mass murder (1980)
