= Politics of Texas =

For about a hundred years, from after Reconstruction until the 1990s, the Democratic Party dominated Texas politics, making it part of the Solid South. In a reversal of alignments, since the late 1960s, the Republican Party has grown more prominent. By the 1990s, it became the state's dominant political party and remained so for decades, as Democrats did not win a statewide race since Bob Bullock won the 1994 Lieutenant gubernatorial election until Gina Hinojosa won the 2026 gubernatorial election and James Talarico was elected a US Senator in the 2026 elections.

Texas is a majority Republican state with Republicans controlling every statewide office. Texas Republicans have majorities in the State House and Senate, an entirely Republican Texas Supreme Court, control of both Senate seats in the US Congress. Texas is America's most-populous Republican state. A number of political commentators had suggested that Texas is trending Democratic since 2016, however, Republicans have continued to win every statewide office through 2025. Despite continued victories, the margin of victory for Republicans in statewide races has continued to shrink. Greg Abbott's gubernatorial win in 2014 was by more than 20 points, shrinking to 13 in 2018, and to just under 11 points in 2022. In 2020, Donald Trump won the state by less than 6 points, the narrowest margin of victory for a Republican since 1996. Notably, Texas Attorney General Ken Paxton, a Republican, said Donald Trump would have lost in Texas in the 2020 election if he had not successfully blocked counties from mailing out applications for mail-in ballots to all registered voters. Despite the narrowing margins, in 2024, Trump won Texas by double digit margins once again, proving Texas remained a solidly red state.

The 19th-century culture of the state was heavily influenced by the plantation culture of the Old South, dependent on African-American slaves, as well as the patron system once prevalent (and still somewhat present) in northern Mexico and South Texas. In these societies, the government's primary role was seen as being the preservation of social order. Solving individual problems in society was seen as a local problem with the expectation that the individual with wealth should resolve their own issues. These influences continue to affect Texas today. In their book, Texas Politics Today 2009-2010, authors Maxwell, Crain, and Santos attribute Texas' traditionally low voter turnout among whites to these influences. But beginning in the early 20th century, voter turnout was dramatically reduced by the state legislature's disenfranchisement of most blacks, and many poor whites and Latinos.

== History of the Republican Party in Texas ==
As a response to the Congressional Reconstruction Act, which was passed in 1867, Texans banded together to what is now called the "Republican Party". Those called "radical republicans" disagreed with President Andrew Johnson's proposal for lenient Reconstruction policies. These republicans believed in the liberation of African Americans and that they deserved to have the same rights as everyone else. The Reconstruction Act of 1867, which designated the actions necessary for the former Confederate states to rejoin the Union was mostly crafted by these Radical Republicans. In order for the rebel states to rejoin the Union, they had to craft a new constitution, which could only be approved through majority consent of residents including African Americans, divide into five military districts (not including Tennessee), and ratify the 14th amendment of the Constitution. After abiding to these stipulations, these states would regain full representation in Congress. These endeavors resulted in the official establishment of the Republican Party. A majority of these party members were freed African Americans, immigrants, and Texas Unionists. The party gained more popularity after demanding that any government official involved in the Rebellion was removed from office. The party continued to grow as it rallied for risky plans that ultimately made the economy boom.

=== Democratic dominance: 1845–mid-1990s ===
From 1848 until Dwight D. Eisenhower's victory in 1952, Texas voted for the Democratic candidate for president in every election except 1928, when it did not support Catholic Al Smith. The Democrats were pro-slavery pre-Civil War, as Abraham Lincoln was a Republican in the North. Most Republicans were Abolitionists. In the mid-20th century 1952 and 1956 elections, the state voters joined the landslide for Dwight D. Eisenhower. (Texas did not vote in 1864 and 1868 due to the Civil War and Reconstruction).

In the post-Civil War era, two of the most important Republican figures in Texas were African Americans George T. Ruby and Norris Wright Cuney. Ruby was a black community organizer, director in the federal Freedmen's Bureau, and leader of the Galveston Union League. His protégé Cuney was a person of mixed-race descent whose wealthy, white planter father freed him and his siblings before the Civil War and arranged for his education in Pennsylvania. Cuney returned and settled in Galveston, where he became active in the Union League and the Republican party; he rose to the leadership of the party. He became influential in Galveston and Texas politics, and is widely regarded as one of the most influential black leaders in the South during the 19th century.

From 1902 through 1965, Texas had virtually disenfranchised most Black, many Latino, and poor White people through the imposition of the poll tax and white primaries. Across the South, Democrats controlled congressional apportionment based on total population, although they had disenfranchised the black population. The Solid South exercised tremendous power in Congress, and Democrats gained important committee chairmanships by seniority. They gained federal funding for infrastructure projects in their states and the region, as well as support for numerous military bases, as two examples of how they brought federal investment to the state and region.

In the post-Reconstruction era, by the late 19th and early 20th centuries, the Republican Party became non-competitive in the South, due to Democrat-dominated legislatures' disenfranchisement of blacks and many poor whites and Latinos. In Texas, the Democrat-dominated legislature excluded them through passage of a poll tax and white primary. Voter turnout in Texas declined dramatically following these disenfranchisement measures, and Southern voting turnout was far below the national average.

Although black people made up 20 percent of the state population at the turn of the century, they were essentially excluded from formal politics. Republican support in Texas had been based almost exclusively in the free black communities, particularly in Galveston, and in the German counties of the rural Texas Hill Country inhabited by German immigrants and their descendants, who had opposed slavery in the antebellum period. The German counties continued to run Republican candidates. Harry M. Wurzbach was elected from the 14th district from 1920 to 1926, contesting and finally winning the election of 1928, and being re-elected in 1930.

Some of the most important American political figures of the 20th century, such as President Lyndon B. Johnson, Vice President John Nance Garner, Speaker of the House Sam Rayburn, and Senator Ralph Yarborough were Texas Democrats. But, the Texas Democrats were rarely united, being divided into conservative, moderate and liberal factions that vied with one another for power.

=== Increasing Republican strength: 1960–1990 ===
Summary of statewide election results for presidential, senatorial, and gubernatorial elections between 1968 and 1990. Won by the Democrats 19+ elections Won by the Democrats in 13–18 elections Won by each party in 10–12 elections Won by the Republicans in 13–18 elections Won by the Republicans in 19+ elections

Beginning in the late 1960s, Republican strength increased in Texas, particularly among residents of the expanding "country club suburbs" around Dallas and Houston. The election, to Congress, of Republicans such as John Tower, (who had switched from the Democratic Party) and George H. W. Bush in 1961 and 1966, respectively, reflected this trend. Nationally, outside of the South, Democrats supported the civil rights movement and achieved important passage of federal legislation in the mid-1960s. In the South, however, Democratic leaders had opposed changes to bring about black voting or desegregated schools and public facilities and in many places exercised resistance. Following the passage of the Civil Rights Act of 1964, southern white voters began to align with the Republican Party, a movement accelerated after the next year, when Congress passed the Voting Rights Act of 1965, providing for federal enforcement of minorities' constitutional right to vote. Voter registration and turnout increased among blacks and Latinos in Texas and other states.

Unlike the rest of the South, however, Texas voters were never especially supportive of the various third-party candidacies of Southern Democrats. It was the only state in the former Confederacy to back Democrat Hubert Humphrey in the 1968 presidential election. During the 1980s, a number of conservative Democrats defected to the GOP, including Senator Phil Gramm, Congressman Kent Hance, and GOP Governor Rick Perry, who was a Democrat during his time as a state lawmaker.

John Tower's 1961 election to the U.S. Senate made him the first statewide GOP officeholder since Reconstruction and the disenfranchisement of black Republicans. Republican Governor Bill Clements and Senator Phil Gramm (also a former Democrat) were elected after him. Republicans became increasingly dominant in national elections in white-majority Texas. The last Democratic presidential candidate to win the state was Jimmy Carter in 1976. In the 1992 election, Bill Clinton became the first Democrat to win the Oval Office while losing Texas electoral votes. This result significantly reduced the power of Texas Democrats at the national level, as party leaders believed the state had become unwinnable.

=== Republican dominance: mid-1990s–present ===
View source data.

United States presidential election results for Texas
Year	Republican / Whig		Democratic		Third party(ies)	
Year	No.	%	No.	%	No.	%
1848	4,509	29.71%	10,668	70.29%	0	0.00%
1852	4,995	26.93%	13,552	73.07%	0	0.00%
1856	0	0.00%	31,169	66.59%	15,639	33.41%
1860	0	0.00%	0	0.00%	62,986	100.00%
1872	47,468	40.71%	66,546	57.07%	2,580	2.21%
1876	44,800	29.96%	104,755	70.04%	0	0.00%
1880	57,893	23.95%	156,428	64.71%	27,405	11.34%
1884	93,141	28.63%	225,309	69.26%	6,855	2.11%
1888	88,422	24.73%	234,883	65.70%	34,208	9.57%
1892	81,144	19.22%	239,148	56.65%	101,853	24.13%
1896	167,520	30.75%	370,434	68.00%	6,832	1.25%
1900	130,641	30.83%	267,432	63.12%	25,633	6.05%
1904	51,242	21.90%	167,200	71.45%	15,566	6.65%
1908	65,666	22.35%	217,302	73.97%	10,789	3.67%
1912	28,530	9.45%	219,489	72.73%	53,769	17.82%
1916	64,999	17.45%	286,514	76.92%	20,948	5.62%
1920	114,538	23.54%	288,767	59.34%	83,336	17.12%
1924	130,023	19.78%	484,605	73.70%	42,881	6.52%
1928	367,036	51.77%	341,032	48.10%	931	0.13%
1932	97,959	11.35%	760,348	88.06%	5,119	0.59%
1936	104,661	12.32%	739,952	87.08%	5,123	0.60%
1940	212,692	18.91%	909,974	80.92%	1,865	0.17%
1944	191,425	16.64%	821,605	71.42%	137,301	11.94%
1948	303,467	24.29%	824,235	65.97%	121,730	9.74%
1952	1,102,878	53.13%	969,228	46.69%	3,840	0.18%
1956	1,080,619	55.26%	859,958	43.98%	14,968	0.77%
1960	1,121,310	48.52%	1,167,567	50.52%	22,207	0.96%
1964	958,566	36.49%	1,663,185	63.32%	5,060	0.19%
1968	1,227,844	39.87%	1,266,804	41.14%	584,758	18.99%
1972	2,298,896	66.20%	1,154,291	33.24%	19,527	0.56%
1976	1,953,300	47.97%	2,082,319	51.14%	36,265	0.89%
1980	2,510,705	55.28%	1,881,147	41.42%	149,785	3.30%
1984	3,433,428	63.61%	1,949,276	36.11%	14,867	0.28%
1988	3,036,829	55.95%	2,352,748	43.35%	37,833	0.70%
1992	2,496,071	40.56%	2,281,815	37.08%	1,376,132	22.36%
1996	2,736,167	48.76%	2,459,683	43.83%	415,794	7.41%
2000	3,799,639	59.30%	2,433,746	37.98%	174,252	2.72%
2004	4,526,917	61.09%	2,832,704	38.22%	51,144	0.69%
2008	4,479,328	55.38%	3,528,633	43.63%	79,830	0.99%
2012	4,569,843	57.13%	3,308,124	41.35%	121,690	1.52%
2016	4,685,047	52.09%	3,877,868	43.12%	430,940	4.79%
2020	5,890,347	52.00%	5,259,126	46.43%	177,813	1.57%
2024	6,393,597	56.14%	4,835,250	42.46%	159,827	1.40%

Despite increasing Republican strength in national elections, after the 1990 census, Texas Democrats still controlled both houses of the State Legislature and most statewide offices. As a result, they directed the redistricting process after the decennial census. Although Congressional Texas Democrats received an average of 45 percent of the votes, Democrats consistently had a majority in the state delegation, as they had in every election since at least the end of Reconstruction.

In 1994, in the midst of the Republican Revolution, Democratic Governor Ann Richards lost her bid for re-election against Republican George W. Bush, ending an era in which Democrats controlled the governorship for all but eight of 120 years. Republicans have won the governorship ever since. In 1998, Bush won re-election in a landslide victory, with Republicans sweeping to victory in all the statewide races. Republicans won the Texas Senate for the first time since Reconstruction in 1996.

After the 2000 census, the Republican-controlled state Senate sought to draw a congressional district map that would guarantee a Republican majority in the state's delegation. The Democrat-controlled state House desired to retain a plan similar to the existing lines. There was an impasse. With the Legislature unable to reach a compromise, the matter was settled by a panel of federal court judges, who ruled in favor of a district map that largely retained the status quo. Republicans controlled the Legislative Redistricting Board, which defines the state legislative districts, by a majority of four to one. They used their voting strength to adopt maps for the state legislature that strongly favored them, as Democrats had done before.

In 2002, Republicans gained control of the Texas House of Representatives for the first time since Reconstruction. The newly elected Republican legislature engaged in an unprecedented mid-decade redistricting plan. Democrats said that the redistricting was a blatant partisan gerrymander, while Republicans argued that it was a much-needed correction of the partisan lines drawn after the 1990 census. The plan was based on the 2000 census, not taking into account the effects of nearly one million new citizens in the state. In the first elections following the redistricting, the Republicans enjoyed a gain of six seats in the 2004, giving them a majority of the state's delegation for the first time since Reconstruction.

In December 2005, the US Supreme Court agreed to hear an appeal that challenged the legality of this redistricting plan. While largely upholding the map, it ruled the El Paso-to-San Antonio 23rd District, which had been a protected majority-Latino district until the 2003 redistricting, was unconstitutionally drawn. The ruling forced nearly every district in the El Paso-San Antonio corridor to be reconfigured. Partly due to this, Democrats picked up two seats in the state in the 2006 elections.

In 2018, Democratic Congressman Beto O'Rourke lost his Senate bid to the incumbent Ted Cruz by 2.6%, the best result for a Democratic Senate candidate since Lloyd Bentsen won in 1988. O'Rourke's performance in 2018 led analysts to predict greater gains for the Democrats going into the 2020s. In the 2020 elections, Texas voted for the Republican nominee for president Donald Trump by a narrower margin than in 2016, and re-elected the Republican incumbent senator, John Cornyn. In the 2022 governor race, the Republican governor Greg Abbott easily won reelection against Beto O'Rourke.

Texas remained a strongly Republican state through the first half of the 2020s. In 2024, Trump expanded his win margin to almost 14 percentage points, the first Republican victory by double digits since 2012, while Ted Cruz won reelection with an eight-percent margin. Until the 2026 United States elections, both Texas U.S. senators were Republican, as were all statewide elected officials, making Texas Republican dominance continued unabated.

The 2026 midterm elections, however, saw the Republican Party lose the governorship, the lieutenancy, the office of the attorney general, four seats in the Texas Supreme Court, and its Class II senator, among other statewide positions, in a Democratic "blue wave". Florida is now the largest state with Republican dominance. Democrats additionally flipped the Texas House of Representatives, while Republicans retain a slight majority in the Texas State Senate.

== Issues ==
=== Capital punishment ===
Texas has a reputation for strict "law and order" sentencing. Texas leads the nation in executions in raw numbers, with 578 executions from 1976 to 2022. The second-highest ranking state is Oklahoma at 119. A 2002 Houston Chronicle poll of Texans found that when asked "Do you support the death penalty?" 69.1% responded that they did, 21.9% did not support and 9.1% were not sure or gave no answer. The Death Penalty Information Center article "Why is Texas #1 Executions?", explains that the three main reasons that Texas' capital punishment cases progress so quickly are that the judges are harsh because that's how they get reelected, Texas doesn't supply a public defender to defendants in need of one, and that Texas didn't allow evidence significance to be lightened while weighing sentencing extents. Historians and death penalty enthusiasts speculate that Texas' natural gravitation towards the death penalty is due to its history of having very traditional values.

=== Secessionist sentiment ===
Texas has a long history with secession. It was originally a Spanish province, which in 1821 seceded from Spain and helped form the First Mexican Empire. In 1824 Texas became a state in the new Mexican republic. In 1835 Antonio López de Santa Anna assumed dictatorial control over that republic and several states openly rebelled against the changes: Coahuila y Tejas (the northern part of which would become the Republic of Texas), San Luis Potosí, Querétaro, Durango, Guanajuato, Michoacán, Yucatán, Jalisco, Nuevo León, Tamaulipas, and Zacatecas. Several of these states formed their own governments: the Republic of the Rio Grande, the Republic of Yucatan, and the Republic of Texas. Only the Texans defeated Santa Anna and retained their independence.

Some Texans believe that because it joined the United States as a country, the Texas state constitution includes the right to secede. However, neither the ordinance of The Texas Annexation of 1845 nor The Annexation of Texas Joint Resolution of Congress March 1, 1845 included provisions giving Texas the right to secede. Texas did originally retain the right to divide into as many as five independent States, and as part of the Compromise of 1850 continues to retain that right while ceding former claims westward and northward along the full length of the Rio Grande in exchange for $10 million from the federal government. See Texas divisionism.

The United States Supreme Court's primary ruling on the legality of secession involved a case brought by Texas involving a Civil War era bonds transfer. In deciding the 1869 Texas v. White case, the Supreme Court first addressed the issue of whether Texas had in fact seceded when it joined the Confederacy. In a 5–3 vote the Court "held that as a matter of constitutional law, no state could leave the Union, explicitly repudiating the position of the Confederate States that the United States was a voluntary compact between sovereign states." In writing the majority opinion Chief Justice Salmon Chase opined that:

When, therefore, Texas became one of the United States, she entered into an indissoluble relation. All the obligations of perpetual union, and all the guaranties of republican government in the Union, attached at once to the State. The act which consummated her admission into the Union was something more than a compact; it was the incorporation of a new member into the political body. And it was final. The union between Texas and the other States was as complete, as perpetual, and as indissoluble as the union between the original States. There was no place for reconsideration or revocation, except through revolution or through consent of the States.

However, as the issue of secession per se was not the one before the court, it has been debated as to whether this reasoning is merely dicta or a binding ruling on the question. It is also worth noting that Salmon Chase was nominated by Abraham Lincoln and was a staunch anti-secessionist. It is unlikely that he or his Republican appointed court would have approved of the Confederacy and Texas' choice to join it.

The state's organized secessionist movement is growing, with a notable minority of Texans holding secessionist sentiments. A 2009 poll found that 31% of Texans believe that Texas has the legal right to secede and form an independent country and 18% believe it should do so. The Texas Nationalist Movement has been working towards Texas independence for 15 years. In January 2021, State Representative Kyle Biedermann filed HB 1359, which would bring a vote for Texas independence to the citizens of Texas in November 2021.

=== Budget ===
Until 2010, Texas had weathered the Great Recession fairly well, buffered by its vast oil and gas industries. It avoided the housing industry meltdown and its unemployment rate continues to be below the national level. It benefited from having a two-year budget cycle, allowing officials create budget plans with more time to focus on issues of importance. However, Texas was impacted by the economic downturn just like many other states, and by 2011 was suffering from tens of billions of dollars in budget deficits. In order to deal with this deficit, a supermajority of Republicans led to a massive cost cutting spree. In order to draw new businesses to the state, Texas has developed a program of tax incentives to corporations willing to move there. These efforts, along with Texas focusing on developing their natural energy resources, has led to a surplus as Texas begins its next two year budget cycle.

Major revenue sources

For FY 2011, the top Texas revenue sources by category were approximately: Federal Income: $42,159,665,863.56 Sales Tax: $21,523,984,733.17 Investments: $10,406,151,499.48 Other Revenue: $8,569,805,443.66 Licenses, Fees, Fines and Penalties: $7,741,880,095.57

As of 2008, Texas residents paid a total of $88,794 million in income taxes. This does not include Federal taxes paid by Texas businesses.

Besides sales tax, other taxes include franchise, insurance, natural gas, alcohol, cigarette and tobacco taxes. Texas has no personal state income tax.

Major spending categories

For FY 2011, the top Texas State Agency spending categories were approximately: Public Assistance Payments: $26,501,123,478.54 Intergovernmental Payments: $21,014,819,852.52 Interfund Transfers/Other: $12,319,487,032.40 Salaries and Wages: $8,595,912,992.82 Employee Benefits: $5,743,905,057.61

== Current state political parties ==
- Republican Party of Texas (State Affiliate of Republican Party)
- Texas Democratic Party (State Affiliate of Democratic Party)
- Libertarian Party of Texas (State Affiliate of Libertarian Party)
- Constitution Party of Texas (State Affiliate of Constitution Party)
- Texas Independence Party (State Affiliate of Independence Party of America)
- Green Party of Texas (State Affiliate of Green Party of the United States)
- Reform Party of Texas (State Affiliate of Reform Party of the United States of America)
- Socialist Party of Texas (State Affiliate of Socialist Party USA)
- Communist Party of Texas (State Affiliate of Communist Party of the United States of America)
- Southern Independence Party (State Specific)
- Confederate Party of Texas (state Specific)

== Federal representation ==
Texas currently has 38 House districts. In the 119th Congress, 13 of Texas's seats are held by Democrats and 25 are held by Republicans:

- Texas's 1st congressional district represented by Nathaniel Moran (R)
- Texas's 2nd congressional district represented by Dan Crenshaw (R)
- Texas's 3rd congressional district represented by Keith Self (R)
- Texas's 4th congressional district represented by Pat Fallon (R)
- Texas's 5th congressional district represented by Lance Gooden (R)
- Texas's 6th congressional district represented by Jake Ellzey (R)
- Texas's 7th congressional district represented by Lizzie Fletcher (D)
- Texas's 8th congressional district represented by Morgan Luttrell (R)
- Texas's 9th congressional district represented by Al Green (D)
- Texas's 10th congressional district represented by Michael McCaul (R)
- Texas's 11th congressional district represented by August Pfluger (R)
- Texas's 12th congressional district represented by Craig Goldman (R)
- Texas's 13th congressional district represented by Ronny Jackson (R)
- Texas's 14th congressional district represented by Randy Weber (R)
- Texas's 15th congressional district represented by Monica De La Cruz (R)
- Texas's 16th congressional district represented by Veronica Escobar (D)
- Texas's 17th congressional district represented by Pete Sessions (R)
- Texas's 18th congressional district represented by Sylvester Turner (D)
- Texas's 19th congressional district represented by Jodey Arrington (R)
- Texas's 20th congressional district represented by Joaquin Castro (D)
- Texas's 21st congressional district represented by Chip Roy (R)
- Texas's 22nd congressional district represented by Troy Nehls (R)
- Texas's 23rd congressional district represented by Tony Gonzales (R)
- Texas's 24th congressional district represented by Beth Van Duyne (R)
- Texas's 25th congressional district represented by Roger Williams (R)
- Texas's 26th congressional district represented by Brandon Gill (R)
- Texas's 27th congressional district represented by Michael Cloud (R)
- Texas's 28th congressional district represented by Henry Cuellar (D)
- Texas's 29th congressional district represented by Sylvia Garcia (D)
- Texas's 30th congressional district represented by Jasmine Crockett (D)
- Texas's 31st congressional district represented by John Carter (R)
- Texas's 32nd congressional district represented by Julie Johnson (D)
- Texas's 33rd congressional district represented by Mark Veasey (D)
- Texas's 34th congressional district represented by Vicente Gonzalez (D)
- Texas's 35th congressional district represented by Greg Casar (D)
- Texas's 36th congressional district represented by Brian Babin (R)
- Texas's 37th congressional district represented by Lloyd Doggett (D)
- Texas's 38th congressional district represented by Wesley Hunt (R)

Texas's two United States senators are Republicans John Cornyn and Ted Cruz, serving since 2002 and 2013, respectively.

Texas is part of the United States District Court for the Western District of Texas, the United States District Court for the Southern District of Texas, the United States District Court for the Eastern District of Texas, and the United States District Court for the Northern District of Texas in the federal judiciary. The district's cases are appealed to the New Orleans–based United States Court of Appeals for the Fifth Circuit.

== Notable Texas political figures ==
- George H. W. Bush, 41st president of the United States (1989-1993) and 43rd vice present of the United States (1981–1989)
- George W. Bush, 43rd president of the United States (2001-2009) and 46th governor of Texas (1995–2000)
- Rick Perry, 47th governor of Texas (2000–2015)
- Greg Abbott, 48th governor of Texas (2015–present)
- Ted Cruz, United States senator from Texas (2013–present)
- John Cornyn, United States senator from Texas (2002–present)
- George R. Brown, supporter of Lyndon B. Johnson who played a key role in his success
- James Talarico, current U.S. Senator-Elect for the State of Texas
- Gina Hinojosa, current Governor-Elect of Texas
George W. Bush

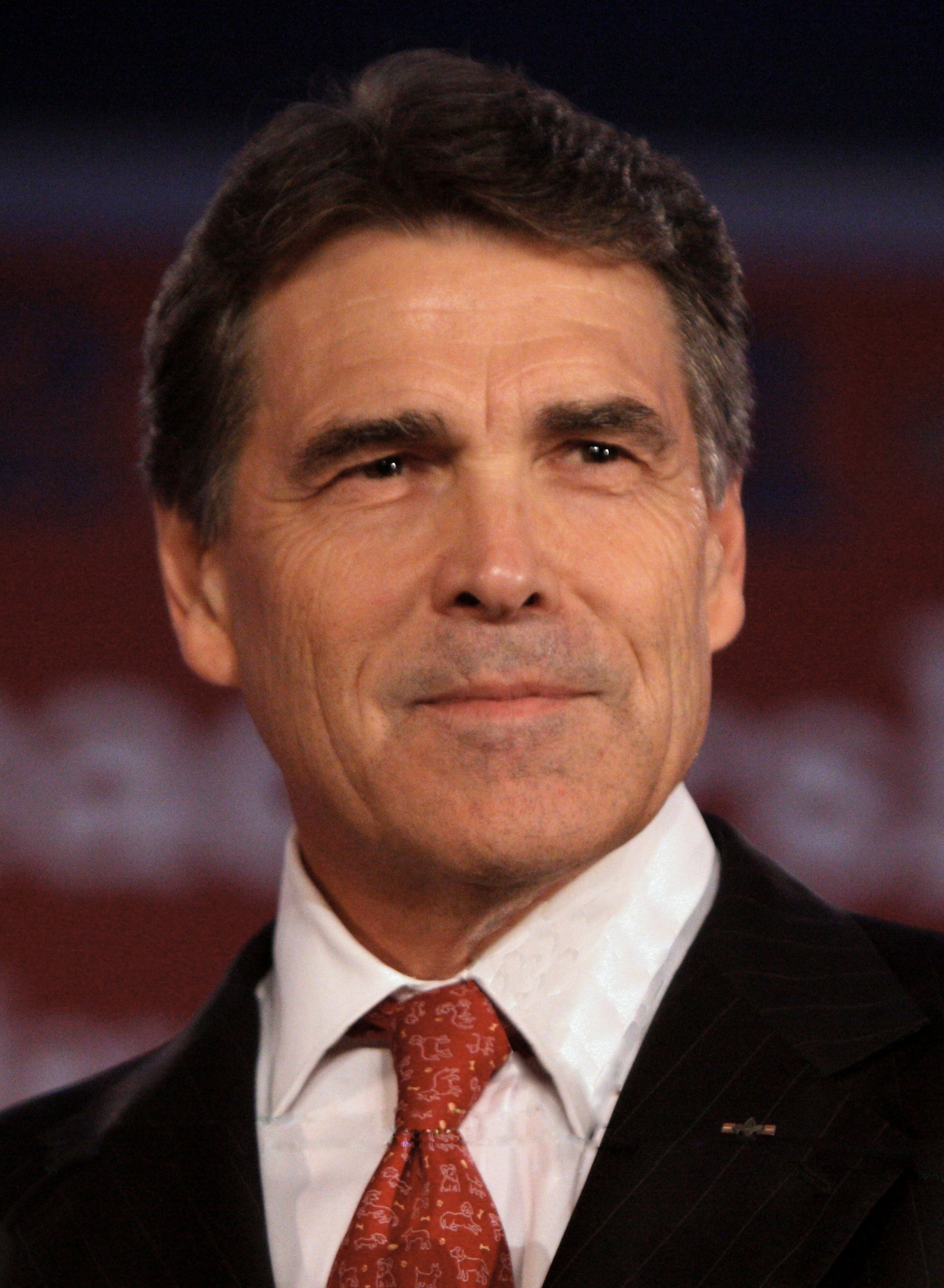
Rick Perry

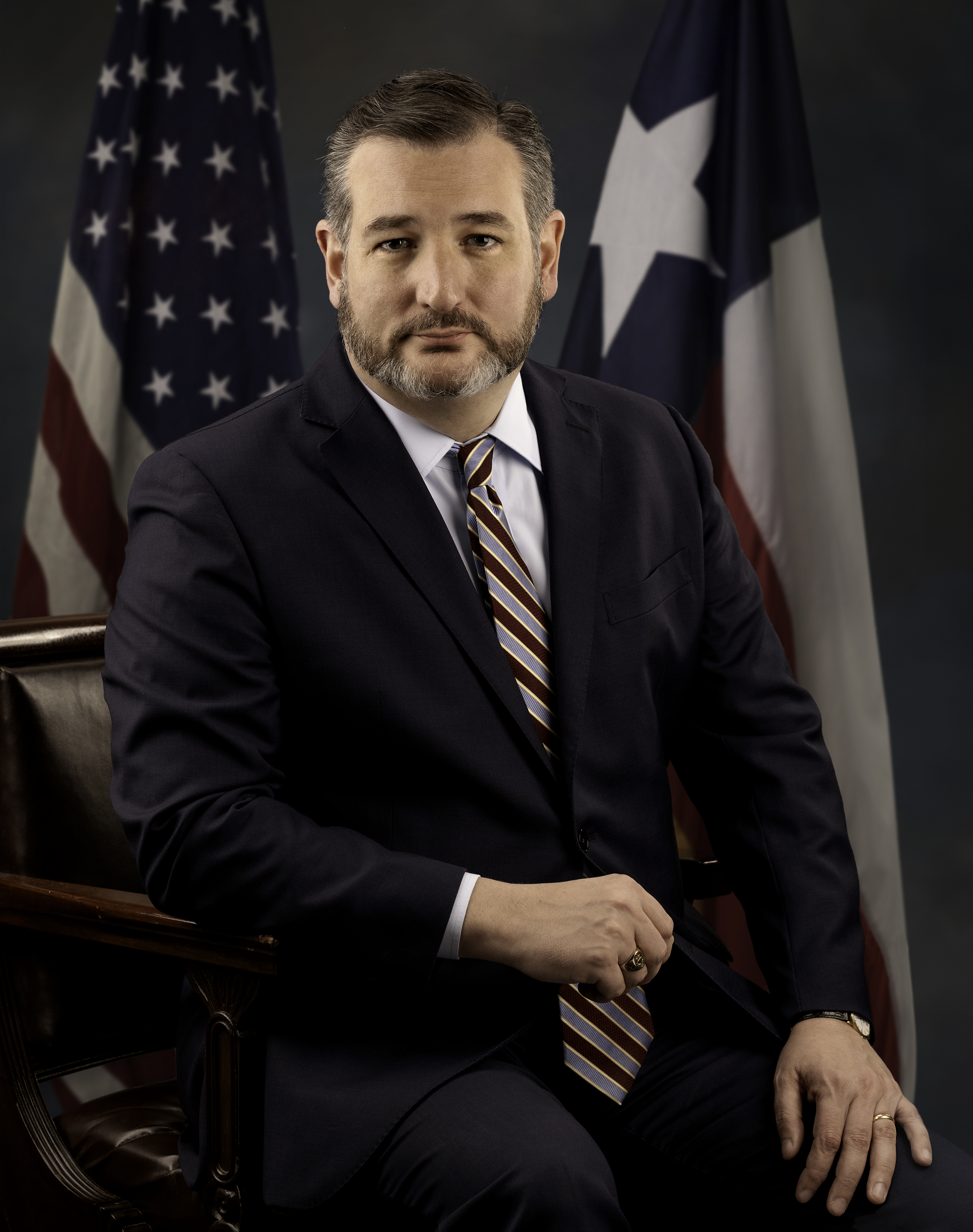
Ted Cruz

== See also ==
- Elections in Texas
- Government of Texas
- Political party strength in Texas
