= 2012 United States presidential election in Michigan =

- November 6, 2012
- Turnout: 63% ▼

Nominee	Barack Obama	Mitt Romney
Party	Democratic	Republican
Home state	Illinois	Massachusetts
Running mate	Joe Biden	Paul Ryan
Electoral vote	16	0
Popular vote	2,564,569	2,115,256
Percentage	54.21%	44.71%

Obama
40–50%
50–60%
60–70%
70–80%
80–90%
90–100%
Romney
40–50%
50–60%
60–70%
70–80%
80–90%
Tie

The 2012 United States presidential election in Michigan took place on November 6, 2012, as part of the 2012 United States presidential election in which all 50 states plus the District of Columbia participated. Voters chose 16 electors to represent them in the Electoral College via a popular vote pitting incumbent Democratic President Barack Obama and his running mate, Vice President Joe Biden, against Republican challenger and former Massachusetts Governor Mitt Romney and his running mate, Congressman Paul Ryan. Michigan is also Romney's birth state despite identifying his home state as Massachusetts.

Michigan was won by Democrat Barack Obama with 54.21% of the vote to Romney's 44.71%, a victory margin of 9.50%. It was the sixth presidential election in a row where Michigan voted in favor of the Democratic candidate, with Republicans last carrying the state in 1988. Obama's margin of victory was significantly decreased from 2008 when he carried the state by 16.44%, and he lost 26 counties that had voted for him four years prior. Many of those counties had gone Democratic for the first time in decades, such as Berrien County, which had not voted for a Democrat since Lyndon B. Johnson in 1964.

As of the 2024 presidential election, this is the last time that Wayne County, the state's most populous county and home to Detroit, was the most Democratic county in Michigan; and the last time that Bay County, Calhoun County, Eaton County, Gogebic County, Isabella County, Lake County, Macomb County, Manistee County, Monroe County, Shiawassee County, and Van Buren County voted for the Democratic candidate. It is also the last time either party carried Michigan by more than 3%.

== Primary elections ==
=== Democratic primary ===
2012 Michigan Democratic presidential caucuses
- May 5, 2012

203 delegates to the Democratic National Convention The number of pledged delegates won is determined by the popular vote

Candidate	Barack Obama	Uncommitted
Home state	Illinois	N/A
Delegate count	203	0
Popular vote	174,054	20,833
Percentage	89.3%	10.7%
- County winner Barack Obama

The Democratic Party used a caucus system to determine the proportion of delegates awarded to Democratic candidates. The caucuses took place May 5; as the only Democratic candidate, President Obama won all 183 pledged delegates in the caucus. They, along with the other 20 unpledged delegates, voted for Obama at the 2012 Democratic National Convention in Charlotte, North Carolina.

2012 Michigan Democratic presidential caucuses
Candidate	Votes	Percentage	Projected delegate count		
Candidate	Votes	Percentage	AP	CNN	GP
Barack Obama (incumbent)	174,054	89.31%	203	203	203
Uncommitted	20,833	10.69%	0	0	0
Total:	194,887	100.00%	203	203	203

=== Republican primary ===
2012 Michigan Republican presidential primary
- February 28, 2012

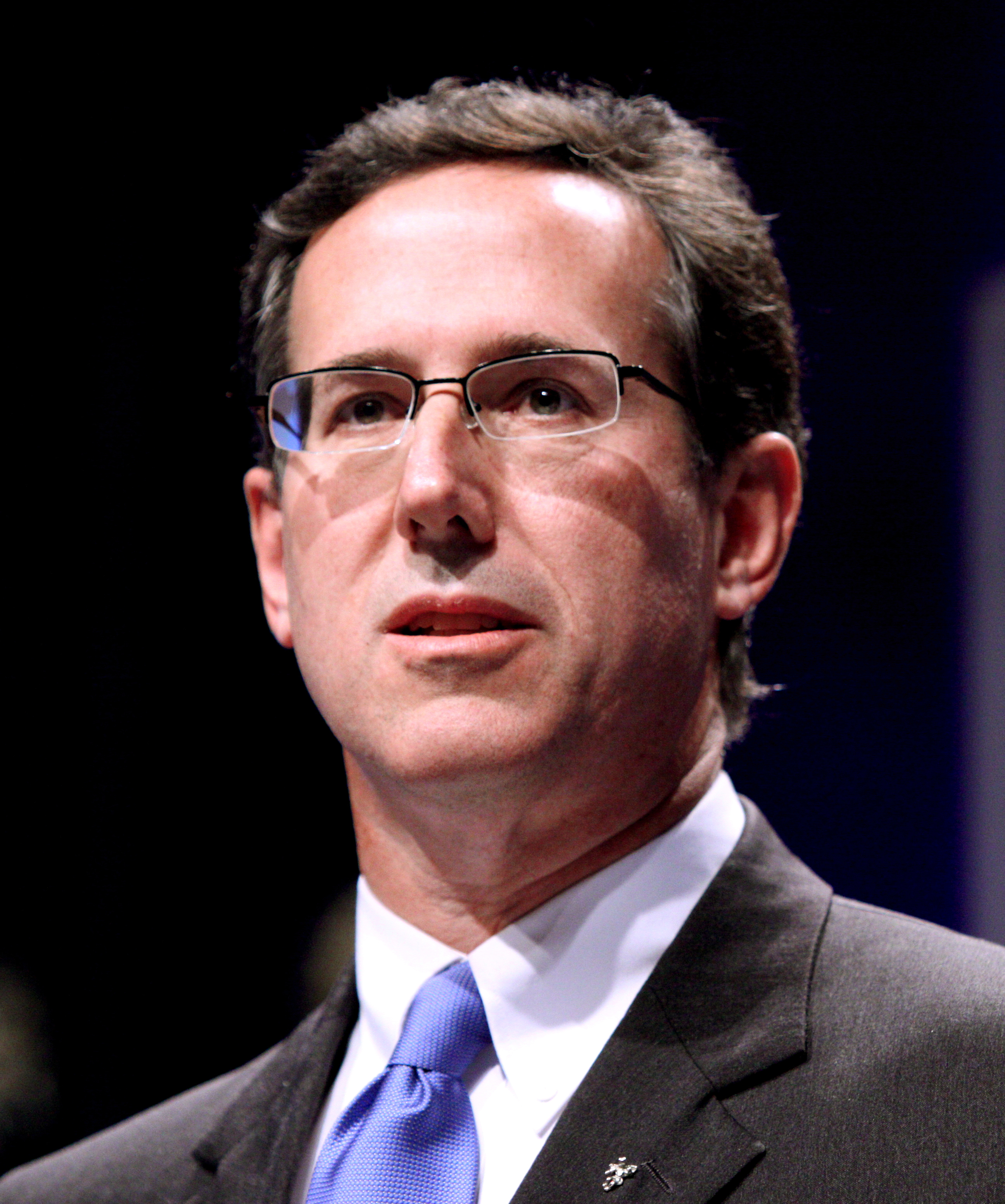

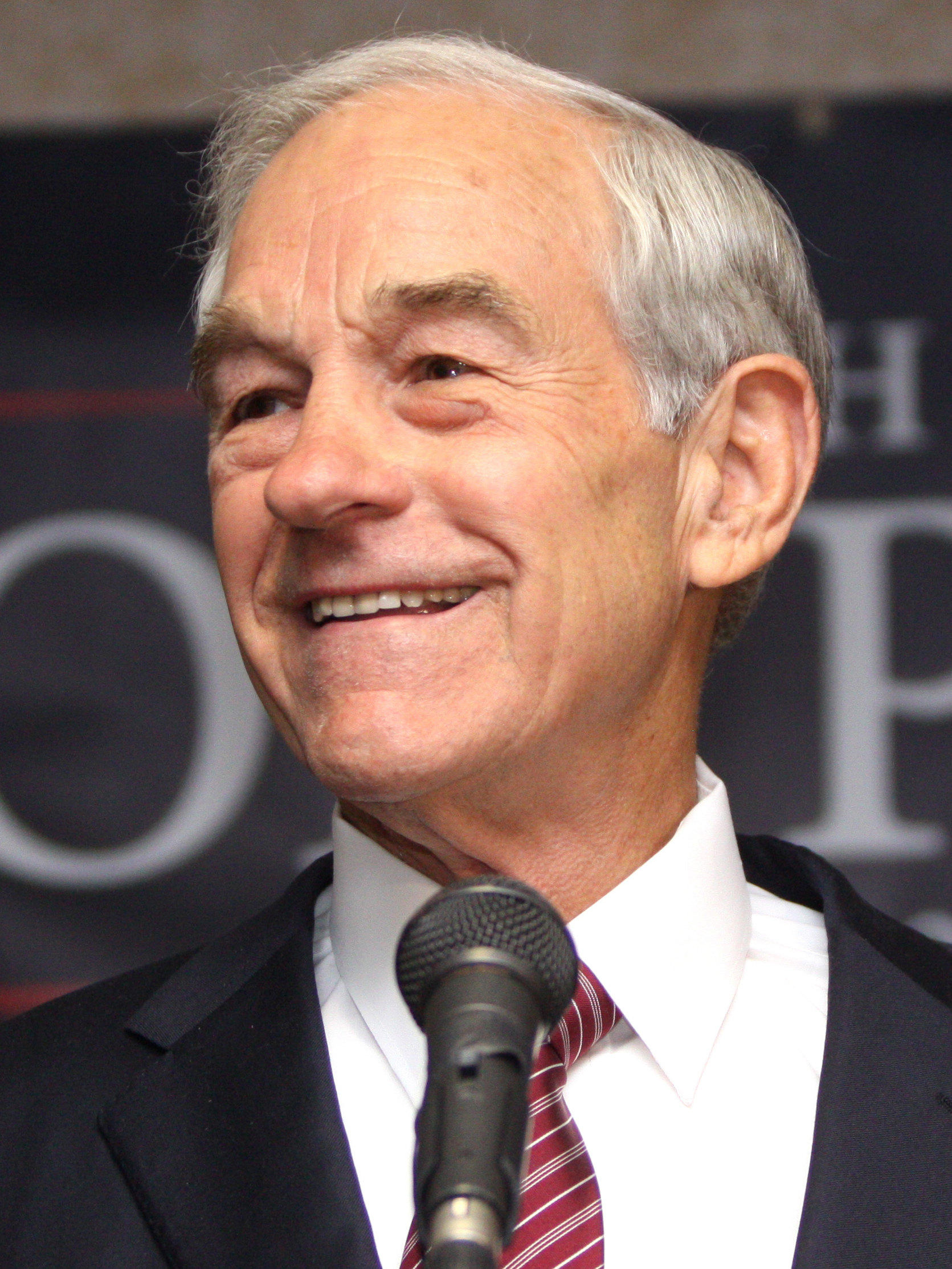

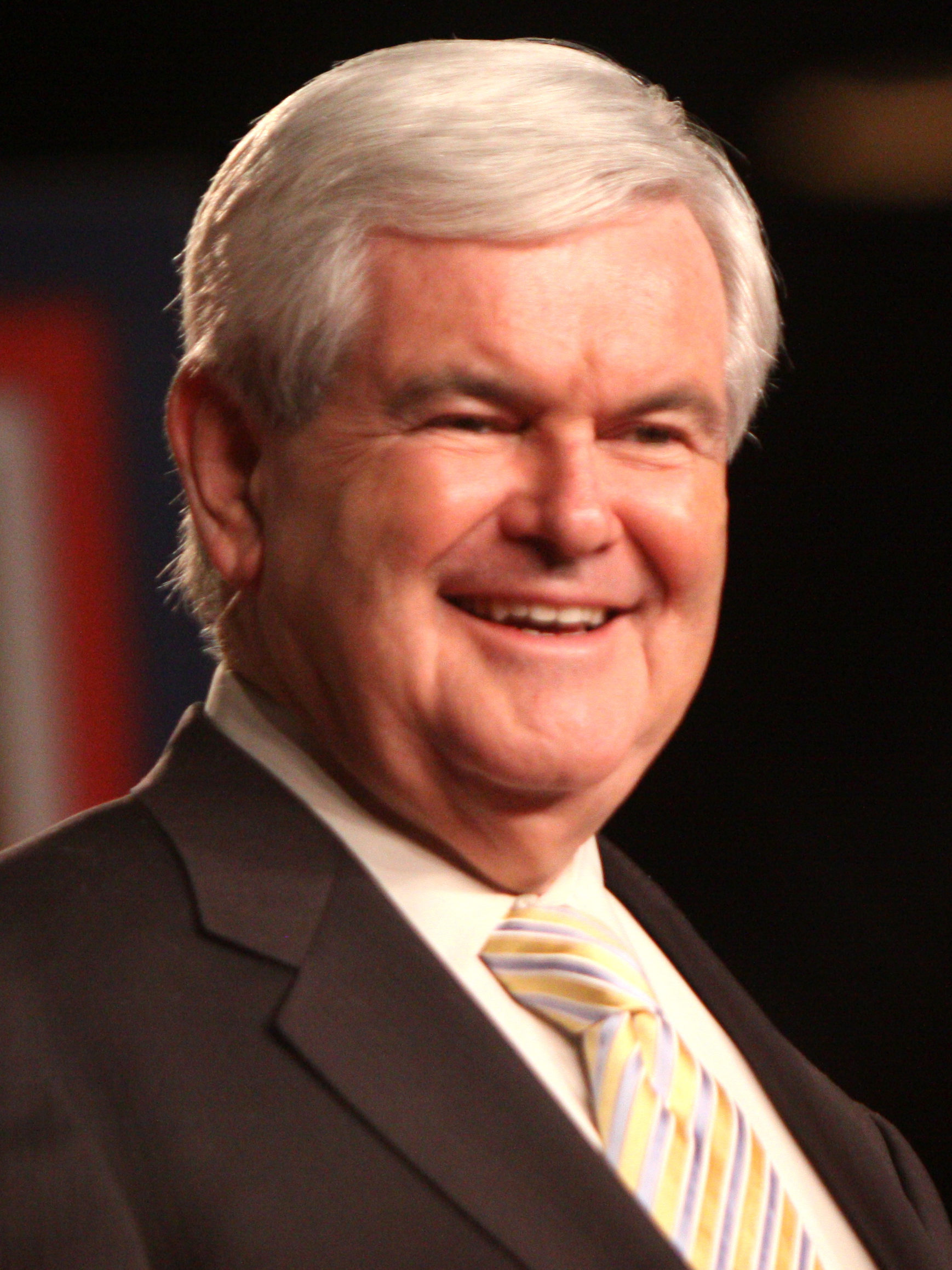
Candidate	Mitt Romney	Rick Santorum
Home state	Massachusetts	Pennsylvania
Delegate count	16	14
Popular vote	409,522	377,372
Percentage	41.10%	37.87%
Candidate	Ron Paul	Newt Gingrich
Home state	Texas	Georgia
Delegate count	0	0
Popular vote	115,911	65,027
Percentage	11.63%	6.53%
- Michigan results by county Mitt Romney Rick Santorum

The Republican primary took place on February 28, 2012, the same day as the Arizona Republican primary. Former Massachusetts Governor Mitt Romney won both of these elections.

This Michigan election used a semi-open primary system (which the state referred to as "closed") in which each voter made a public declaration at their election site and received the ballot for the appropriate party, rather than the fully open system used in the past. The state had 7,286,556 registered voters as of February 15, and delegates were awarded proportionately.

Michigan was given 59 delegates to the Republican (GOP) national convention, but that number was reduced to 30 as a penalty for bringing the election date forward before March 6 as the GOP rules set. The candidate with the greatest number of votes in each of the 14 congressional districts will receive that district's two delegates. Two additional delegates for Michigan were announced by the media to be given proportionally before the election but after the election the Michigan GOP announced there had been an error in the memo published and that the two delegates will be given to the winner, which sparked accusations of Mitt Romney rigging the results from Rick Santorum's team.

==== Campaign ====
While Romney has close ties to Michigan, where he was born and grew up and his father George W. Romney was the Governor, Santorum, who once trailed Romney badly in the state, had a clear lead over him in mid February after Santorum won Colorado, Minnesota, and Missouri caucuses and primary on February 7. And the competition became a statistical tie between these two candidates before the primary.

Since Michigan allows primary voters to declare their affiliation at the time they vote, Santorum campaign paid for robo-calls inviting Democrats to cross over and vote for him. Romney called this tactic "outrageous" and "disgusting" but Santorum defended himself as not doing anything wrong but getting people to vote in an open primary.

Some Democrats also urged their supporters to vote for Santorum in the Republican primary, in hopes of forcing the Republican candidates to use more resources and help make it easier for Barack Obama to win the general election. This is similar to Rush Limbaugh's "Operation Chaos", where Limbaugh urged voters in the 2008 Democratic Presidential primaries to vote for Hillary Clinton, whom he saw as being a weaker candidate than Obama. Michigan has a long history of such crossover voting; in 2000, strong Democratic crossover votes helped Senator John McCain win the Michigan Republican primary. In 1972, Republican crossover votes propelled Governor George Wallace to victory in the Democratic primary.

==== Results ====
Polls closed at 8 PM local time on election day. While most of the state is in the Eastern time zone (UTC −5), four counties in the Upper Peninsula are on Central time (UTC −6), so the final closures came at 9 PM Eastern time. As of 2/28, results showed Romney winning 7 congressional districts and Santorum winning 7.

2012 Michigan Republican presidential primary
Candidate	Votes	Percentage	Projected delegate count		
Candidate	Votes	Percentage	AP	CNN	GP
Mitt Romney	409,522	41.10%	16	16	16
Rick Santorum	377,372	37.87%	14	14	14
Ron Paul	115,911	11.63%	0	0	0
Newt Gingrich	65,027	6.53%	0	0	0
Rick Perry (withdrawn)	1,816	0.18%	0	0	0
Buddy Roemer (withdrawn)	1,784	0.18%	0	0	0
Michele Bachmann (withdrawn)	1,735	0.17%	0	0	0
Jon Huntsman (withdrawn)	1,674	0.17%	0	0	0
Herman Cain (withdrawn)	1,211	0.12%	0	0	0
Fred Karger	1,180	0.12%	0	0	0
Gary Johnson (withdrawn)	458	0.05%	0	0	0
Uncommitted	18,809	1.89%	0	0	0
Unprojected delegates:			2	0	0
Total:	996,499	100.00%	30	30	30

At the Republican state convention in May, it was reported that of the 30 voting delegates for the national convention in Tampa, 6 were Paul supporters, and 24 were Romney supporters. Paul organizers disputed these numbers, stating that they had actually taken 8 (instead of 6) of the voting delegates, plus several non-voting slots.

==== Delegate allocation controversy ====
A controversy arose over the delegate allocation in Michigan, where 28 congressional district delegates and two at-large delegates were awarded. The Republican Party of Michigan rules stated that the two at-large delegates would be awarded proportionally, meaning that Santorum and Romney would get one delegate each for a 15–15 tie. But the following day the party's credentials committee allocated both at-large delegates to Romney, saying it had changed the rules a few weeks prior to award the delegates to the statewide winner but "in error" sent a memo to the candidates saying they would be awarded proportionately. Santorum's campaign protested, saying the committee's six members were mostly Romney supporters, and filed a protest with the Republican National Committee. Santorum's general counsel wrote in a letter to the RNC, "It is our understanding that several public supporters and Michigan surrogates of an opposing campaign voted in favor of the delegate allocation change which assisted their chosen candidate. This request is not about the allocation of a single delegate; it is about ensuring a transparent process, avoiding unscrupulous tactics and backroom deals by establishment figures and campaigns who have not received the result they hoped for at the ballot box." Committee member and former state attorney general Mike Cox endorsed Romney, but said the delegates should have been awarded 15-15: "I have this crazy idea that you follow the rules. I'd love to give the at-large delegates to Mitt Romney, but our rules provide for strict apportionment."

== General election ==
=== Predictions ===
Source	Ranking	As of
Huffington Post	Lean D	November 6, 2012
CNN	Lean D	November 6, 2012
New York Times	Lean D	November 6, 2012
Washington Post	Lean D	November 6, 2012
RealClearPolitics	Tossup	November 6, 2012
Sabato's Crystal Ball	Likely D	November 5, 2012
FiveThirtyEight	Solid D	November 6, 2012

=== Candidate ballot access ===
- Mitt Romney/Paul Ryan, Republican
- Barack Obama/Joseph Biden, Democratic
- Virgil Goode/Jim Clymer, US Taxpayers
- Jill Stein/Cheri Honkala, Green
- Rocky Anderson/Luis J. Rodriguez, Natural Law

Write-in candidate access:

- Gary Johnson/James P. Gray, Libertarian

=== Results ===
2012 United States presidential election in Michigan
Party	Candidate	Running mate	Votes	Percentage	Electoral votes
Democratic	Barack Obama (incumbent)	Joe Biden (incumbent)	2,564,569	54.04%	16
Republican	Mitt Romney	Paul Ryan	2,115,256	44.58%	0
Green	Jill Stein	Cheri Honkala	21,897	0.46%	0
Constitution	Virgil Goode	Jim Clymer	16,119	0.34%	0
Libertarian (Write-in)	Gary Johnson	Jim Gray	7,774	0.16%	0
Natural Law	Rocky Anderson	Luis J. Rodriguez	5,147	0.11%	0
Socialist (Write-in)	Stewart Alexander	Alex Mendoza	89	0.00%	0
Socialist Equality (Write-in)	Jerry White	Phyllis Scherrer	68	0.00%	0
America's (Write-in)	Tom Hoefling	J.D. Ellis	42	0.00%	0
Totals			4,730,961	100.00%	16
Voter turnout (registered voters)					63.46%

==== By county ====
County	Barack Obama Democratic		Mitt Romney Republican		Various candidates Other parties		Margin		Total votes cast
County	#	%	#	%	#	%	#	%	Total votes cast
Alcona	2,472	40.50%	3,571	58.50%	61	1.00%	-1,099	-18.00%	6,104
Alger	2,212	47.90%	2,330	50.45%	76	1.65%	-118	-2.55%	4,618
Allegan	20,806	39.42%	31,123	58.97%	846	1.61%	-10,317	-19.55%	52,775
Alpena	6,549	46.48%	7,298	51.79%	244	1.73%	-749	-5.31%	14,091
Antrim	5,107	38.70%	7,917	60.00%	171	1.30%	-2,810	-21.30%	13,195
Arenac	3,669	46.79%	4,057	51.74%	115	1.47%	-388	-4.95%	7,841
Baraga	1,574	45.10%	1,866	53.47%	50	1.43%	-292	-8.37%	3,490
Barry	11,491	40.15%	16,655	58.20%	471	1.65%	-5,164	-18.05%	28,617
Bay	27,877	52.02%	24,911	46.49%	798	1.49%	2,966	5.53%	53,586
Benzie	4,685	47.32%	5,075	51.26%	141	1.42%	-390	-3.94%	9,901
Berrien	33,465	45.99%	38,209	52.51%	1,088	1.50%	-4,744	-6.52%	72,762
Branch	6,913	40.32%	10,035	58.52%	199	1.16%	-3,122	-18.20%	17,147
Calhoun	29,267	50.18%	28,333	48.58%	727	1.24%	934	1.60%	58,327
Cass	9,591	42.65%	12,659	56.29%	240	1.06%	-3,068	-13.64%	22,490
Charlevoix	5,939	42.05%	8,000	56.64%	186	1.31%	-2,061	-14.59%	14,125
Cheboygan	5,831	43.68%	7,286	54.58%	233	1.74%	-1,455	-10.90%	13,350
Chippewa	7,100	45.34%	8,278	52.86%	282	1.80%	-1,178	-7.52%	15,660
Clare	6,338	46.83%	6,988	51.63%	209	1.54%	-650	-4.80%	13,535
Clinton	18,191	46.36%	20,650	52.63%	394	1.01%	-2,459	-6.27%	39,235
Crawford	2,994	43.94%	3,744	54.95%	76	1.11%	-750	-11.01%	6,814
Delta	8,330	45.95%	9,534	52.59%	266	1.46%	-1,204	-6.64%	18,130
Dickinson	4,952	38.53%	7,688	59.82%	211	1.65%	-2,736	-21.29%	12,851
Eaton	27,913	50.95%	26,197	47.82%	678	1.23%	1,716	3.13%	54,788
Emmet	7,225	40.67%	10,253	57.71%	287	1.62%	-3,028	-17.04%	17,765
Genesee	128,978	63.30%	71,808	35.24%	2,956	1.46%	57,170	28.06%	203,742
Gladwin	5,760	45.78%	6,661	52.94%	162	1.28%	-901	-7.16%	12,583
Gogebic	4,058	53.30%	3,444	45.24%	111	1.46%	614	8.06%	7,613
Grand Traverse	20,875	43.31%	26,534	55.05%	788	1.64%	-5,659	-11.74%	48,197
Gratiot	7,610	47.46%	8,241	51.39%	184	1.15%	-631	-3.93%	16,035
Hillsdale	7,106	37.20%	11,727	61.40%	267	1.40%	-4,621	-24.20%	19,100
Houghton	6,801	44.27%	8,196	53.36%	364	2.37%	-1,395	-9.09%	15,361
Huron	6,518	42.10%	8,806	56.87%	160	1.03%	-2,288	-14.77%	15,484
Ingham	80,847	63.01%	45,306	35.31%	2,157	1.68%	35,541	27.70%	128,310
Ionia	11,018	42.61%	14,315	55.36%	523	2.03%	-3,297	-12.75%	25,856
Iosco	6,242	46.63%	6,909	51.62%	234	1.75%	-667	-4.99%	13,385
Iron	2,687	44.69%	3,224	53.63%	101	1.68%	-537	-8.94%	6,012
Isabella	13,038	53.74%	10,800	44.52%	422	1.74%	2,238	9.22%	24,260
Jackson	32,301	46.35%	36,298	52.09%	1,086	1.56%	-3,997	-5.74%	69,685
Kalamazoo	69,051	55.83%	52,662	42.58%	1,977	1.59%	16,389	13.25%	123,690
Kalkaska	3,272	39.43%	4,901	59.06%	126	1.51%	-1,629	-19.63%	8,299
Kent	133,408	45.35%	155,925	53.00%	4,873	1.65%	-22,517	-7.65%	294,206
Keweenaw	582	41.81%	774	55.60%	36	2.59%	-192	-13.79%	1,392
Lake	2,752	51.83%	2,487	46.84%	71	1.33%	265	4.99%	5,310
Lapeer	18,796	43.60%	23,734	55.05%	585	1.35%	-4,938	-11.45%	43,115
Leelanau	6,576	46.25%	7,483	52.63%	160	1.12%	-907	-6.38%	14,219
Lenawee	21,776	48.47%	22,351	49.75%	801	1.78%	-575	-1.28%	44,928
Livingston	37,216	37.73%	60,083	60.91%	1,341	1.36%	-22,867	-23.18%	98,640
Luce	991	38.17%	1,580	60.86%	25	0.97%	-589	-22.69%	2,596
Mackinac	2,652	43.35%	3,397	55.53%	68	1.12%	-745	-12.18%	6,117
Macomb	208,016	51.30%	191,913	47.33%	5,586	1.37%	16,103	3.97%	405,515
Manistee	6,473	52.19%	5,737	46.26%	192	1.55%	736	5.93%	12,402
Marquette	18,115	56.00%	13,606	42.06%	625	1.94%	4,509	13.94%	32,346
Mason	6,856	46.75%	7,580	51.69%	229	1.56%	-724	-4.94%	14,665
Mecosta	7,515	44.26%	9,176	54.04%	289	1.70%	-1,661	-9.78%	16,980
Menominee	5,242	47.80%	5,564	50.73%	161	1.47%	-322	-2.93%	10,967
Midland	17,450	41.57%	23,919	56.98%	610	1.45%	-6,469	-15.41%	41,979
Missaukee	2,274	32.36%	4,665	66.39%	88	1.25%	-2,391	-34.03%	7,027
Monroe	36,310	49.68%	35,593	48.69%	1,192	1.63%	717	0.99%	73,095
Montcalm	11,430	44.74%	13,621	53.32%	497	1.94%	-2,191	-8.58%	25,548
Montmorency	2,049	40.57%	2,928	57.97%	74	1.46%	-879	-17.40%	5,051
Muskegon	44,436	58.16%	30,884	40.43%	1,077	1.41%	13,552	17.73%	76,397
Newaygo	8,728	40.64%	12,457	58.00%	293	1.36%	-3,729	-17.36%	21,478
Oakland	349,002	53.40%	296,514	45.37%	8,055	1.23%	52,488	8.03%	653,571
Oceana	5,063	44.22%	6,239	54.49%	148	1.29%	-1,176	-10.27%	11,450
Ogemaw	4,791	46.09%	5,437	52.31%	166	1.60%	-646	-6.22%	10,394
Ontonagon	1,586	44.81%	1,906	53.86%	47	1.33%	-320	-9.05%	3,539
Osceola	3,981	38.73%	6,141	59.75%	156	1.52%	-2,160	-21.02%	10,278
Oscoda	1,657	40.88%	2,308	56.95%	88	2.17%	-651	-16.07%	4,053
Otsego	4,681	39.37%	7,011	58.96%	199	1.67%	-2,330	-19.59%	11,891
Ottawa	42,737	32.19%	88,166	66.41%	1,854	1.40%	-45,429	-34.22%	132,757
Presque Isle	3,192	44.97%	3,794	53.45%	112	1.58%	-602	-8.48%	7,098
Roscommon	6,198	47.40%	6,701	51.24%	178	1.36%	-503	-3.84%	13,077
Saginaw	54,381	55.33%	42,720	43.46%	1,191	1.21%	11,661	11.87%	98,292
St. Clair	33,983	45.81%	39,271	52.94%	927	1.25%	-5,288	-7.13%	74,181
St. Joseph	10,112	43.13%	12,978	55.36%	355	1.51%	-2,866	-12.23%	23,445
Sanilac	7,212	39.09%	10,963	59.42%	275	1.49%	-3,751	-20.33%	18,450
Schoolcraft	1,865	45.92%	2,142	52.75%	54	1.33%	-277	-6.83%	4,061
Shiawassee	17,197	51.06%	15,962	47.39%	520	1.55%	1,235	3.67%	33,679
Tuscola	11,425	43.76%	14,240	54.54%	445	1.70%	-2,815	-10.78%	26,110
Van Buren	16,290	49.61%	16,141	49.15%	406	1.24%	149	0.46%	32,837
Washtenaw	120,890	67.04%	56,412	31.28%	2,965	1.68%	64,478	35.76%	180,337
Wayne	595,846	72.83%	213,814	26.13%	8,476	1.04%	382,032	46.70%	818,136
Wexford	6,184	41.51%	8,450	56.72%	264	1.77%	-2,266	-15.21%	14,898
Totals	2,564,569	54.04%	2,115,256	44.58%	65,491	1.38%	449,313	9.46%	4,745,316

===== Counties that flipped from Democratic to Republican =====
- Alger (largest city: Munising)
- Alpena (largest city: Alpena)
- Arenac (largest city: Standish)
- Benzie (largest city: Frankfort)
- Berrien (largest city: Niles)
- Cass (largest city: Dowagiac)
- Clare (largest city: Clare)
- Clinton (largest city: St. Johns)
- Delta (largest city: Escanaba)
- Gladwin (largest city: Gladwin)
- Gratiot (largest city: Alma)
- Iosco (largest city: East Tawas)
- Iron (largest city: Iron River)
- Jackson (largest city: Jackson)
- Kent (largest city: Grand Rapids)
- Leelanau (largest settlement: Greilickville)
- Lenawee (largest city: Adrian)
- Mason (largest city: Ludington)
- Menominee (largest city: Menominee)
- Oceana (largest city: Hart)
- Ogemaw (largest city: West Branch)
- Ontonagon (largest village: Ontonagon)
- Presque Isle (largest city: Rogers City)
- Roscommon (largest settlement: Houghton Lake)
- Schoolcraft (largest city: Manistique)
- St. Clair (largest city: Port Huron)

==== By congressional district ====
Despite losing the state, Romney won nine of 14 congressional districts.

District	Obama	Romney	Representative
1st	45%	53%	Dan Benishek
2nd	43%	56%	Bill Huizenga
3rd	46%	53%	Justin Amash
4th	46%	54%	Dave Camp
5th	61%	38%	Dan Kildee
6th	49%	50%	Fred Upton
7th	48%	51%	Tim Walberg
8th	48%	51%	Mike Rogers
9th	57%	42%	Sander Levin
10th	44%	55%	Candice Miller
11th	47%	52%	Kerry Bentivolio
12th	66%	33%	John Dingell
13th	85%	14%	John Conyers
14th	81%	18%	Gary Peters

== Analysis ==
All of the local polling firms had predicted a close election here, some even giving an advantage to native Michigander Romney over Obama; however, statistician Nate Silver pointed out several problems with the local pollsters' methodology and sampling errors, instead giving more credence to the national pollsters who posited a clear victory for Obama (by a mean of 7.3 points and a median of 7.0 over Romney).

In the end, Silver and the National pollsters were correct: Obama defeated Romney by over 9 points in the November 2012 election. Obama dominated the population centers that had traditionally anchored Democratic strength in the state—Detroit, Lansing, Ann Arbor, and Flint—but he also retained two populous counties that had been Republican strongholds in the 1970s and 1980s, the Detroit-area suburban counties of Oakland and Macomb. Even in Kent County, which flipped back to the Republican column, Romney substantially underperformed what Bush had done in 2000 and 2004. Arenac County voted Republican for the first time since 1984. While Romney did better in more rural areas, without better strength in some of the state's population centers, Romney was unable to flip the state.

== See also ==
- United States presidential elections in Michigan
- 2012 Republican Party presidential primaries
- Timeline of the 2012 United States presidential election
- 2012 Republican Party presidential debates and forums
- Results of the 2012 Republican Party presidential primaries
- Michigan Republican Party
