= 2012 United States presidential election in Indiana =

- November 6, 2012
- Turnout: 58.46%

Nominee	Mitt Romney	Barack Obama
Party	Republican	Democratic
Home state	Massachusetts	Illinois
Running mate	Paul Ryan	Joe Biden
Electoral vote	11	0
Popular vote	1,420,543	1,152,887
Percentage	54.13%	43.93%

Romney
50–60%
60–70%
70–80%
Obama
40–50%
50–60%
60–70%
President before election
Barack Obama
Democratic
Elected President
Barack Obama
Democratic

A presidential election was held in Indiana on November 6, 2012, as part of the 2012 United States presidential election, in which all 50 states plus the District of Columbia participated. Indiana voters chose 11 electors to represent them in the Electoral College via a popular vote pitting incumbent Democratic President Barack Obama and his running mate, Vice President Joe Biden, against Republican challenger and former Governor of Massachusetts Mitt Romney and his running mate, Wisconsin Congressman Paul Ryan. Romney and Ryan carried Indiana with 54.13% of the popular vote to the Democratic ticket's 43.93%, thus winning the state's 11 electoral votes.

Indiana and North Carolina were the only two states Obama won in 2008 that flipped to the Republican column in 2012. Although Indiana normally leans Republican, in 2008 Obama had been the first Democrat to win Indiana since 1964, albeit by a narrow 1.03% margin. Unlike North Carolina, Indiana was not seriously contested again by the Obama campaign in 2012; consequently, Romney was able to carry it by a 10.2% margin and win 6 counties Obama won in 2008.

Obama carried Vigo County, home to Terre Haute, and at the time a noted bellwether; before 2020, it had voted for the winner of every presidential election all but twice since 1892. After 2012, political realignment and shift of white working-class voters to Trump, exodus of young people to cities and the rightward turn of exurban areas accelerated by the Trump era have made Vigo County generally uncompetitive to the present day. As of the 2024 presidential election, this is the last time that Delaware, LaPorte, Perry, Porter, and Vigo counties have voted for a Democratic presidential candidate. Obama won nine counties compared to 83 for Romney, who won most rural areas of the state. Romney also performed well in the Indianapolis suburbs; Allen County, home of Fort Wayne; and Vanderburgh County, home of Evansville. As expected, Obama did better in urban, densely populated areas. Obama trounced Romney in Marion County, home of Indianapolis, as well as Lake County, home of Gary and East Chicago. Obama also for the most part did well in counties that contained major colleges, such as Monroe County, home of Indiana University Bloomington; St. Joseph County, home of the University of Notre Dame in South Bend; and Porter County, home of Valparaiso University. This was also the last election in which Indiana was considered a swing state by some outlets.

== Primary elections ==
=== Democratic primary ===
Incumbent President Barack Obama ran unopposed, securing 221,466 votes.

=== Republican primary ===
The Republican primary took place on May 8, 2012.

Indiana Republican primary, 2012
Candidate	Votes	Percentage	Projected delegate count		
Candidate	Votes	Percentage	AP	CNN	FOX
Mitt Romney	410,635	64.61%	28	27	
Ron Paul	98,487	15.50%			
Rick Santorum (withdrawn)	85,332	13.43%			
Newt Gingrich (withdrawn)	41,135	6.47%			
Unprojected delegates:			18	19	46
Total:	635,589	100.00%	46	46	46

== General election ==
=== Campaign ===
Incumbent Obama did not visit Indiana, although First Lady Michelle Obama, Vice President Joe Biden and former President Bill Clinton stumped in the state. Meanwhile, Romney visited Indiana several times.

=== Polling ===
Republican Nominee Mitt Romney won every pre-election poll conducted in the state by at least 5%, and often by double digits. The average of the final three polls had Romney leading Obama 51% to 43%.

=== Predictions ===
Source	Ranking	As of
Huffington Post	Safe R (flip)	November 6, 2012
CNN	Safe R (flip)	November 6, 2012
New York Times	Lean R (flip)	November 6, 2012
Washington Post	Safe R (flip)	November 6, 2012
RealClearPolitics	Lean R (flip)	November 6, 2012
Sabato's Crystal Ball	Solid R (flip)	November 5, 2012
FiveThirtyEight	Solid R (flip)	November 6, 2012

=== Results ===
2012 United States presidential election in Indiana
Party	Candidate	Votes	%	±%
Republican	Mitt Romney Paul Ryan	1,420,543	54.13	▲5.22
Democratic	Barack Obama Joe Biden	1,152,887	43.93	▼6.02
Libertarian	Gary Johnson Jim Gray	50,111	1.91	▲0.85
Green	Jill Stein (write-in) N/A (Note: Stein had no registered running mate in Indiana.)	625	0.02	▲0.02
Constitution	Virgil Goode (write-in) N/A (Note: Goode had no registered running mate in Indiana.)	290	0.01	▼0.03
Independent	Tom Hoefling (write-in) (Note: Hoefling and Ellis were the national candidates of America's Party.) Jonathan Ellis (write-in)	35	0.00	▲0.00
Socialist	Stewart Alexander (write-in) Alejandro Mendoza (write-in)	17	0.00	Steady
Independent	Jill Reed (write-in) N/A (Note: Reed had no registered running mate in Indiana.)	8	0.00	▲0.00
Independent	Randall Terry (write-in) N/A (Note: Terry had no registered running mate in Indiana.)	8	0.00	▲0.00
Independent Democrat	Dennis Knill (write-in) N/A (Note: Knill had no registered running mate in Indiana.)	7	0.00	▲0.00
Independent Republican	John A. Dummett, Jr. (write-in) N/A (Note: Dummett had no registered running mate in Indiana.)	2	0.00	Steady
Freedom Socialist	Christina Lopez (write-in) (Note: Lopez was the national vice-presidential candidate of the Freedom Socialist Party.) N/A (Note: Lopez had no registered running mate in Indiana)	1	0.00	▲0.00
Total votes		2,624,534	100.00	

Following Romney's win in Indiana, The Indianapolis Star said that "Voters painted Indiana bright red on Tuesday- with a splash or so of blue" and that "voters also proved that while this state is conservative, it doesn't like to stray too far from the middle".

==== By county ====
County	Mitt Romney Republican		Barack Obama Democratic		Various candidates Other parties		Margin		Total
County	#	%	#	%	#	%	#	%	Total
Adams	8,937	68.58%	3,806	29.21%	289	2.21%	5,131	39.37%	13,032
Allen	84,613	57.46%	60,036	40.77%	2,597	1.77%	24,577	16.69%	147,246
Bartholomew	18,083	61.52%	10,625	36.15%	684	2.33%	7,458	25.37%	29,392
Benton	2,329	65.09%	1,159	32.39%	90	2.52%	1,170	32.70%	3,578
Blackford	2,711	56.95%	1,927	40.48%	122	2.57%	784	16.47%	4,760
Boone	18,808	67.70%	8,328	29.98%	646	2.32%	10,480	37.72%	27,782
Brown	4,332	56.75%	3,060	40.08%	242	3.17%	1,272	16.67%	7,634
Carroll	4,999	64.01%	2,635	33.74%	176	2.25%	2,364	30.27%	7,810
Cass	8,443	59.62%	5,371	37.93%	347	2.45%	3,072	21.69%	14,161
Clark	25,450	53.83%	20,807	44.01%	1,021	2.16%	4,643	9.82%	47,278
Clay	7,096	65.67%	3,460	32.02%	249	2.31%	3,636	33.65%	10,805
Clinton	6,338	64.13%	3,308	33.47%	237	2.40%	3,030	30.66%	9,883
Crawford	2,421	52.75%	2,041	44.47%	128	2.78%	380	8.28%	4,590
Daviess	7,638	74.42%	2,437	23.74%	189	1.84%	5,201	50.68%	10,264
Dearborn	15,394	68.86%	6,528	29.20%	434	1.94%	8,866	39.66%	22,356
Decatur	7,119	68.94%	2,941	28.48%	267	2.58%	4,178	40.46%	10,327
DeKalb	10,587	64.71%	5,419	33.12%	354	2.17%	5,168	31.59%	16,360
Delaware	21,251	47.15%	22,654	50.26%	1,169	2.59%	-1,403	-3.11%	45,074
Dubois	11,654	62.75%	6,522	35.12%	395	2.13%	5,132	27.63%	18,571
Elkhart	42,378	62.29%	24,399	35.87%	1,252	1.84%	17,979	26.42%	68,029
Fayette	5,045	57.09%	3,555	40.23%	237	2.68%	1,490	16.86%	8,837
Floyd	19,878	56.17%	14,812	41.85%	702	1.98%	5,066	14.32%	35,392
Fountain	4,664	65.59%	2,237	31.46%	210	2.95%	2,427	34.13%	7,111
Franklin	7,424	70.17%	2,909	27.50%	247	2.33%	4,515	42.67%	10,580
Fulton	5,317	65.43%	2,621	32.25%	188	2.32%	2,696	33.18%	8,126
Gibson	9,487	64.45%	4,928	33.48%	306	2.07%	4,559	30.97%	14,721
Grant	15,151	59.82%	9,589	37.86%	589	2.32%	5,562	21.96%	25,329
Greene	8,457	64.36%	4,350	33.10%	334	2.21%	4,107	31.26%	13,141
Hamilton	90,747	66.20%	43,796	31.95%	2,546	1.85%	46,951	34.25%	137,089
Hancock	22,796	69.41%	9,319	28.37%	728	2.22%	13,477	41.04%	32,843
Harrison	10,640	60.21%	6,607	37.39%	424	2.40%	4,033	22.82%	17,671
Hendricks	44,312	66.37%	21,112	31.62%	1,337	2.01%	23,200	34.75%	66,761
Henry	10,838	57.02%	7,613	40.05%	556	2.93%	3,225	16.97%	19,007
Howard	20,327	56.01%	15,135	41.70%	829	2.29%	5,192	14.31%	36,291
Huntington	10,862	68.76%	4,596	29.09%	339	2.15%	6,266	39.67%	15,797
Jackson	10,419	62.34%	5,838	34.93%	455	2.73%	4,581	27.41%	16,712
Jasper	7,955	61.57%	4,672	36.16%	293	2.27%	3,283	25.41%	12,920
Jay	4,645	58.79%	3,063	38.77%	193	2.44%	1,582	20.02%	7,901
Jefferson	7,096	53.94%	5,728	43.54%	332	2.52%	1,368	10.40%	13,156
Jennings	6,120	59.71%	3,821	37.28%	309	3.01%	2,299	22.43%	10,250
Johnson	39,513	68.02%	17,260	29.71%	1,319	2.27%	22,253	38.31%	58,092
Knox	9,612	63.47%	5,228	34.52%	305	2.01%	4,384	28.95%	15,145
Kosciusko	22,558	74.84%	6,862	22.77%	720	2.39%	15,696	52.07%	30,140
LaGrange	6,231	66.88%	2,898	31.11%	187	2.01%	3,333	35.77%	9,316
Lake	68,431	33.85%	130,897	64.75%	2,819	1.40%	-62,466	-30.90%	202,147
LaPorte	18,615	42.62%	24,107	55.19%	959	2.19%	-5,492	-12.57%	43,681
Lawrence	11,622	65.04%	5,779	32.34%	469	2.62%	5,843	32.70%	17,870
Madison	26,769	50.98%	24,407	46.48%	1,334	2.54%	2,362	4.50%	52,510
Marion	136,509	37.92%	216,336	60.10%	7,127	1.98%	-79,827	-22.18%	359,972
Marshall	11,260	63.25%	6,137	34.48%	404	2.27%	5,123	28.77%	17,801
Martin	3,262	68.78%	1,351	28.48%	130	2.74%	1,911	40.30%	4,743
Miami	8,174	63.79%	4,222	32.95%	417	3.26%	3,952	30.84%	12,813
Monroe	22,481	39.29%	33,436	58.43%	1,306	2.28%	-10,955	-19.14%	57,223
Montgomery	9,824	68.03%	4,271	29.58%	345	2.39%	5,553	38.45%	14,440
Morgan	19,591	69.17%	7,969	28.13%	765	2.70%	11,622	41.04%	28,325
Newton	3,291	58.02%	2,212	39.00%	169	2.98%	1,079	19.02%	5,672
Noble	10,680	65.63%	5,229	32.13%	364	2.24%	5,451	33.50%	16,273
Ohio	1,759	62.40%	994	35.26%	66	2.34%	765	27.14%	2,819
Orange	4,617	59.38%	2,939	37.80%	220	2.82%	1,678	21.58%	7,776
Owen	5,062	62.39%	2,823	34.80%	228	2.81%	2,239	27.59%	8,113
Parke	4,234	64.85%	2,110	32.32%	185	2.83%	2,124	32.53%	6,529
Perry	3,403	43.21%	4,316	54.81%	156	1.98%	-913	-11.60%	7,875
Pike	3,627	61.20%	2,125	35.86%	174	2.94%	1,502	25.34%	5,926
Porter	34,406	46.94%	37,252	50.82%	1,645	2.24%	-2,846	-3.88%	73,303
Posey	7,430	60.77%	4,533	37.08%	263	2.15%	2,897	23.69%	12,226
Pulaski	3,366	62.34%	1,899	35.17%	134	2.49%	1,467	27.17%	5,399
Putnam	9,005	65.12%	4,507	32.59%	317	2.29%	4,498	32.53%	13,829
Randolph	6,218	60.95%	3,769	36.94%	215	2.11%	2,449	24.01%	10,202
Ripley	7,484	67.94%	3,241	29.42%	290	2.64%	4,243	38.52%	11,015
Rush	4,633	65.94%	2,221	31.61%	172	2.45%	2,412	34.33%	7,026
Scott	4,539	52.05%	3,998	45.85%	183	2.10%	541	6.20%	8,720
Shelby	10,978	65.50%	5,359	31.97%	423	2.53%	5,619	33.53%	16,760
Spencer	5,515	56.60%	4,026	41.32%	203	2.08%	1,489	15.28%	9,744
St. Joseph	52,578	47.36%	56,460	50.86%	1,971	1.78%	-3,882	-3.50%	111,009
Starke	4,738	54.03%	3,809	43.44%	222	2.53%	929	10.59%	8,769
Steuben	8,547	62.41%	4,853	35.44%	295	2.15%	3,694	26.97%	13,695
Sullivan	4,902	59.13%	3,191	38.49%	197	2.38%	1,711	20.64%	8,290
Switzerland	1,872	55.11%	1,437	42.30%	88	2.59%	435	12.81%	3,397
Tippecanoe	28,757	50.40%	26,711	46.81%	1,595	2.79%	2,046	3.59%	57,063
Tipton	4,773	64.74%	2,432	32.99%	168	2.27%	2,341	31.75%	7,373
Union	2,022	65.14%	1,018	32.80%	64	2.06%	1,004	32.34%	3,104
Vanderburgh	39,389	54.26%	31,725	43.71%	1,474	2.03%	7,664	10.55%	72,588
Vermillion	3,426	51.89%	2,979	45.12%	198	2.99%	447	6.77%	6,603
Vigo	19,369	48.42%	19,712	49.27%	924	2.31%	-343	-0.85%	40,005
Wabash	8,644	67.03%	3,973	30.81%	278	2.16%	4,671	36.22%	12,895
Warren	2,377	62.55%	1,324	34.84%	99	2.61%	1,053	27.71%	3,800
Warrick	17,680	62.19%	10,181	35.81%	566	2.00%	7,499	26.38%	28,427
Washington	6,533	60.85%	3,909	36.41%	295	2.74%	2,624	24.44%	10,737
Wayne	14,321	56.21%	10,591	41.57%	565	2.22%	3,730	14.64%	25,477
Wells	9,256	71.46%	3,436	26.53%	260	2.01%	5,820	44.93%	12,952
White	5,970	60.09%	3,637	36.61%	328	3.30%	2,333	23.48%	9,935
Whitley	10,258	68.24%	4,420	29.40%	354	2.36%	5,838	38.84%	15,032
Totals	1,422,872	54.04%	1,154,275	43.84%	55,996	2.13%	268,597	10.20%	2,633,143

Counties that flipped from Democratic to Republican

- Madison (largest city: Anderson)
- Spencer (largest city: Santa Claus)
- Starke (largest city: Knox)
- Tippecanoe (largest city: Lafayette)
- Vanderburgh (largest city: Evansville)
- Vermillion (largest city: Clinton)

==== By congressional district ====
Romney won seven of nine congressional districts.

District	Romney	Obama	Representative
1st	37.39%	61.19%	Pete Visclosky
2nd	56.1%	42.14%	Jackie Walorski
3rd	62.54%	35.7%	Marlin Stutzman
4th	60.88%	36.87%	Todd Rokita
5th	57.5%	40.7%	Susan Brooks
6th	60.43%	37.28%	Luke Messer
7th	35.35%	62.9%	André Carson
8th	58.37%	39.61%	Larry Bucshon
9th	57.17%	40.7%	Todd Young

== See also ==
- United States presidential elections in Indiana
- 2012 Republican Party presidential debates and forums
- 2012 Republican Party presidential primaries
- Results of the 2012 Republican Party presidential primaries

== Sources ==
- "2012 presidential elector candidates (as of September 7, 2012)" (PDF). Secretary of State of Indiana. Archived from the original (PDF) on March 28, 2013.
