= 1908 United States presidential election in Texas =

- November 3, 1908
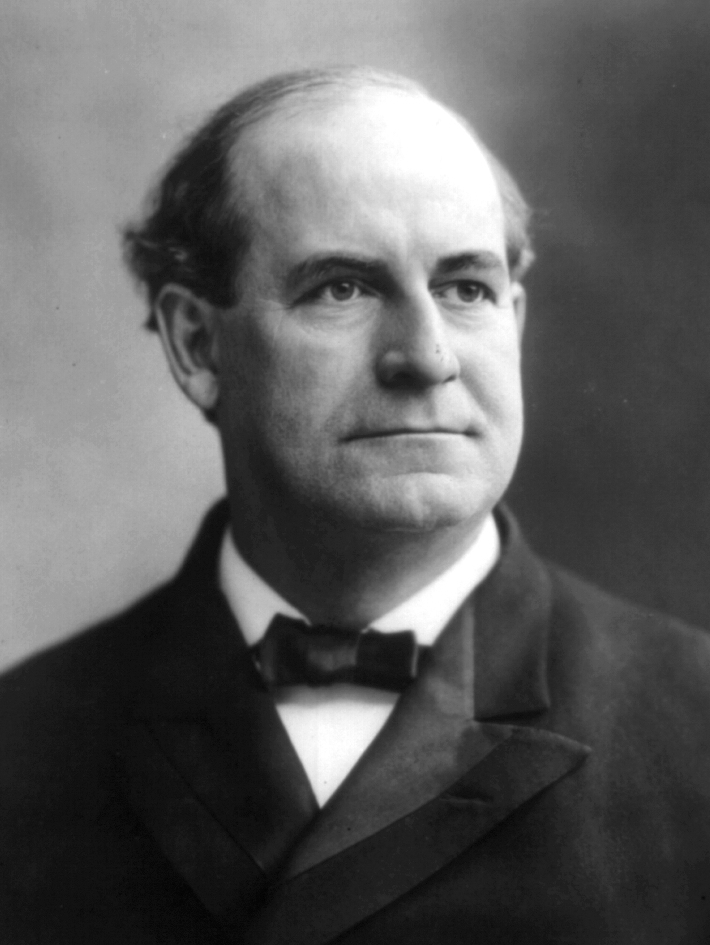

| Nominee | William Jennings Bryan | William Howard Taft |
| Party | Democratic | Republican |
| Home state | Nebraska | Ohio |
| Running mate | John W. Kern | James S. Sherman |
| Electoral vote | 18 | 0 |
| Popular vote | 217,302 | 65,666 |
| Percentage | 73.97% | 22.35% |
County results
Bryan
50–60%
60–70%
70–80%
80–90%
90–100%
Taft
40–50%
50–60%
60–70%
70–80%
80–90%
90–100%
President before election
Theodore Roosevelt
Republican
Elected President
William Howard Taft
Republican

The 1908 United States presidential election in Texas took place on November 3, 1908. Voters chose 18 representatives, or electors to the Electoral College, who voted for president and vice president.

Texas overwhelmingly voted for the Democratic nominee, former U.S. Representative William Jennings Bryan, over the Republican nominee, Secretary of War William Howard Taft. Bryan won Texas by a landslide margin of 51.62%.

Bryan had previously won Texas against William McKinley in both 1896 and 1900. With 73.97% of the popular vote, Texas would also prove to be Bryan's fourth strongest victory in terms of percentage in the popular vote only after South Carolina, Mississippi and Louisiana.

== Results ==
1908 United States presidential election in Texas
| Party | Candidate | Running mate | Popular vote | | Electoral vote | |
| Party | Candidate | Running mate | Count | % | Count | % |
|---|---|---|---|---|---|---|
| Democratic | William Jennings Bryan of Nebraska | John Worth Kern of Indiana | 217,302 | 73.97% | 18 | 100.00% |
| Republican | William Howard Taft of Ohio | James Schoolcraft Sherman of New York | 65,666 | 22.35% | 0 | 0.00% |
| Socialist | Eugene Victor Debs of Indiana | Benjamin Hanford of New York | 7,870 | 2.68% | 0 | 0.00% |
| Prohibition | Eugene Wilder Chafin of Illinois | Aaron Sherman Watkins of Ohio | 1,634 | 0.56% | 0 | 0.00% |
| Populist | Thomas Edward Watson of Georgia | Samuel Wardell Williams of Indiana | 994 | 0.34% | 0 | 0.00% |
| Socialist Labor | August Gillhaus of New York | Donald L. Munro of Virginia | 176 | 0.06% | 0 | 0.00% |
| Independence | Thomas Louis Hisgen of Massachusetts | John Temple Graves of Georgia | 115 | 0.04% | 0 | 0.00% |
| Total | | | 293,757 | 100.00% | 18 | 100.00% |

== See also ==
- United States presidential elections in Texas
