= 1900 United States presidential election in Texas =

- November 6, 1900

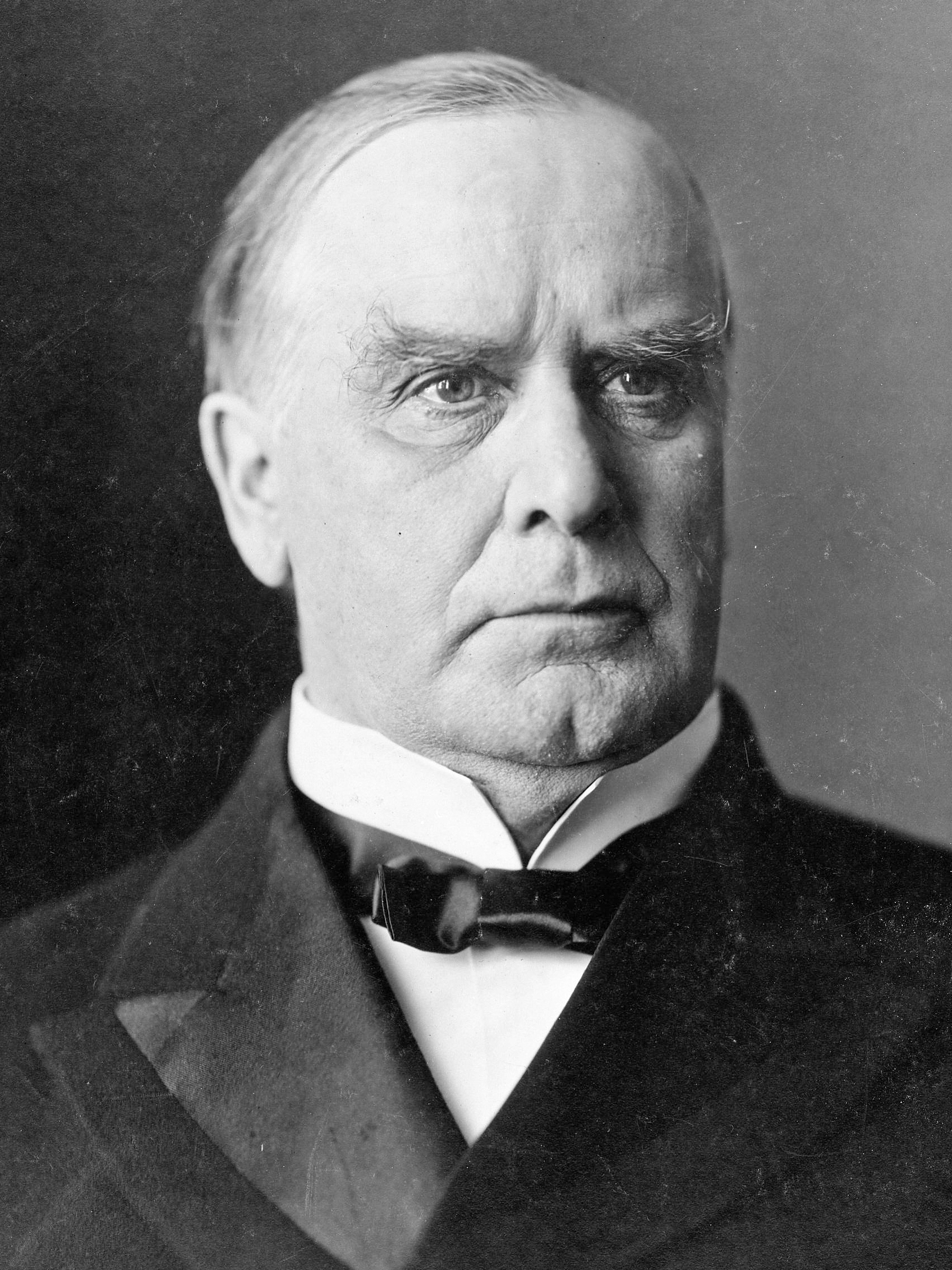
Nominee	William Jennings Bryan	William McKinley
Party	Democratic	Republican
Home state	Nebraska	Ohio
Running mate	Adlai Stevenson I	Theodore Roosevelt
Electoral vote	15	0
Popular vote	267,432	130,641
Percentage	63.12%	30.83%
County results
Bryan
40–50%
50–60%
60–70%
70–80%
80–90%
90–100%
McKinley
40–50%
50–60%
60–70%
70–80%
80–90%
President before election
William McKinley
Republican
Elected President
William McKinley
Republican

The 1900 United States presidential election in Texas took place on November 6, 1900. All contemporary 45 states were part of the 1900 United States presidential election. State voters chose 15 electors to the Electoral College, which selected the president and vice president.

Texas was won by the Democratic nominees, former U.S. Representative William Jennings Bryan of Nebraska and his running mate Adlai Stevenson I of Illinois. They defeated incumbent President William McKinley and his running mate Theodore Roosevelt of New York. Bryan won Texas by a margin of 32.39%.

Bryan had previously won Texas against McKinley in four years earlier and would later win the state again against William Howard Taft in 1908.

== Results ==
1900 United States presidential election in Texas
Party	Candidate	Votes	Percentage	Electoral votes
Democratic	William Jennings Bryan	267,432	63.12%	15
Republican	William McKinley (incumbent)	130,641	30.83%	0
Populist	Wharton Barker	20,981	4.95%	0
Prohibition	John G. Woolley	2,644	0.62%	0
Social Democratic	Eugene V. Debs	1,846	0.44%	0
Socialist Labor	Joseph F. Malloney	162	0.04%	0
Totals		423,706	100.00%	15
Voter turnout				—

== See also ==
- United States presidential elections in Texas
