= Socialist Party of Texas =

Democratic socialist political party in the U.S. state of Texas

- Senate leader: None
- House leader: None
- Founded: 1906 (SPA); 1973 (SPUSA)
- Headquarters: West Warren St. Pharr, TX
- Ideology: Democratic socialism
- National affiliation: Socialist Party USA
- Colors: Red
- Seats in the Upper House: 0 / 31
- Seats in the Lower House: 0 / 150

The Socialist Party of Texas (SPTX) is a democratic socialist political party in the U.S. state of Texas. It is the state chapter of the Socialist Party USA. It was founded in 1906 as an affiliate of the Socialist Party of America.

In 1912, the SPTX effectively tied the Republican and Progressive Parties in votes. In 1914 and 1916, the Socialist Party surpassed the Republican Party in the state.

The Socialist Party of America voted 73-34 to change its name to Social Democrats, USA in December 1972. SPUSA was founded in 1973, after which the SPTX was founded.

The party has local chapters in the Rio Grande Valley and the Dallas-Fort Worth Metroplex.

== Notable members ==
- Alejandro Mendoza, Fort Worth businessperson and SPUSA vice-presidential nominee in 2012
