= Communist Party of Texas =

- Founded: 1919
- Headquarters: Houston
- Youth wing: Young Communist League
- Ideology: Communism; Marxism–Leninism
- Political position: Far-left
- National affiliation: Communist Party USA
- Colors: Red
- Texas Senate: 0 / 31
- Texas House of Representatives: 0 / 150

The Communist Party of Texas is a political party in the U.S. state of Texas. It is a member of the Communist Party USA and operates as a state district. The party is headquartered in Houston.

The Communist Party's aim is the abolition of private ownership and control of capital and the construction of a classless, moneyless, and stateless society thereafter. Its most recent state conference was held in January 2018. The party has city clubs in Austin, Dallas, Houston, Lufkin, and San Antonio.

According to the Texas law, passed in 1954, it is illegal for any public official (elected or otherwise) to be a communist, which makes it difficult for the party to participate in elections. However, the narrow definition of "communist", added in 1993 as Section 557.021, as "a person who commits an act reasonably calculated to further the overthrow of the government, by force or violence or by unlawful or unconstitutional means and replace it with a communist government" at least opened the window for a non-violent, non-criminal communist to run.
