= Alejandro Mendoza =

American politician

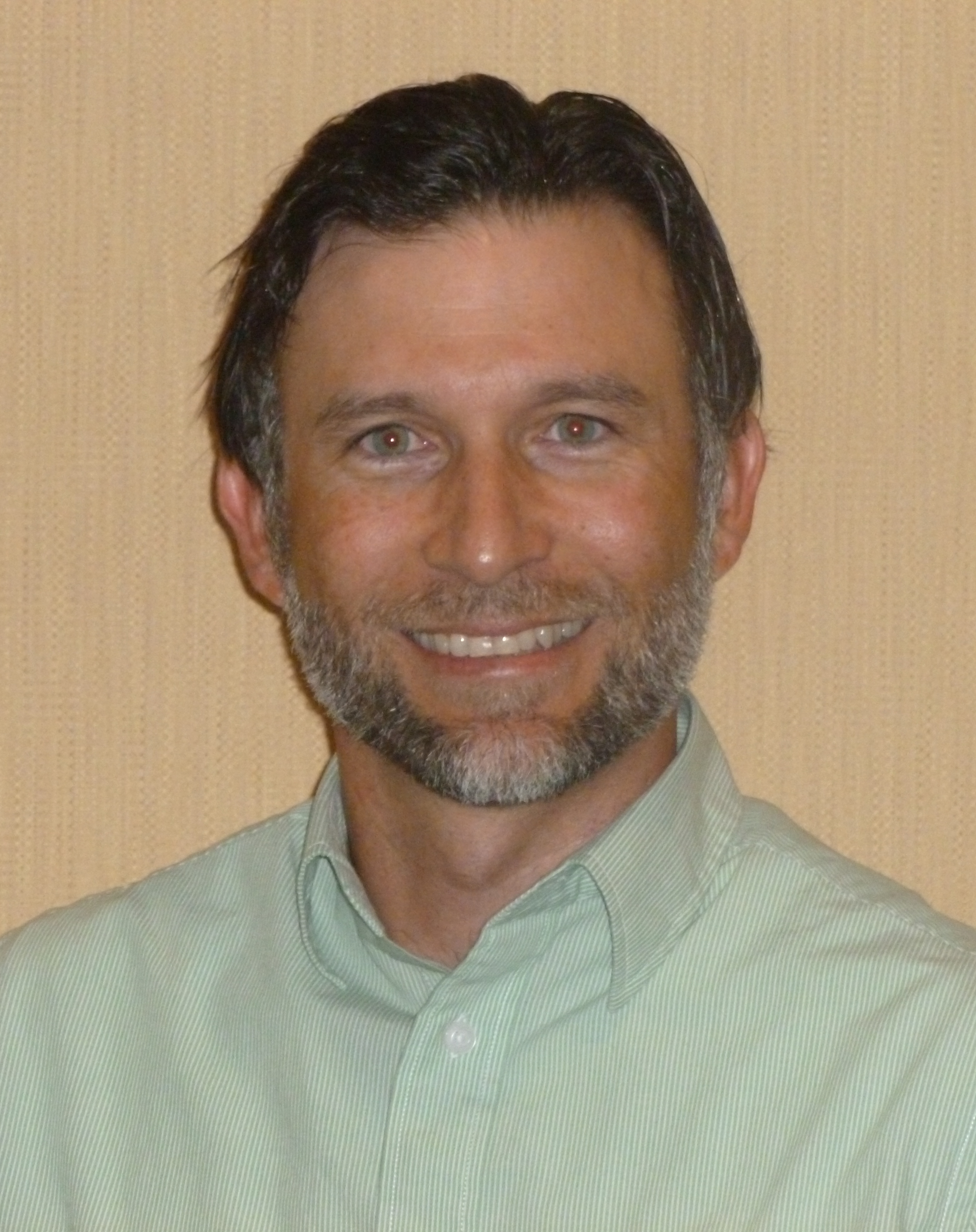
- Mendoza in Los Angeles, California, on October 16, 2011, the day after his nomination for Vice President of the United States

Personal details
- Born: April 25, 1977 (age 49) Riverside, California, United States
- Party: Socialist
- Education: Dallas County Community College, University of North Texas

Alejandro "Alex" Mendoza (born April 25, 1977) is an American former Marine, owner of a lawn care business and democratic socialist politician from Dallas, Texas, who was the vice presidential nominee of Socialist Party USA in the 2012 elections. Mendoza, of Texas, ran with Stewart Alexander of California for president. Mendoza is the State Chair for the Socialist Party of Texas.

Mendoza was born in Riverside, California to parents who emigrated from Mexicali, Baja California, Mexico. Mendoza graduated from Palm Springs High School in 1995. Shortly after graduation, Mendoza joined the United States Marine Corps, and served with the 5th Marine Regiment for four years. Mendoza moved to Texas shortly after leaving the corps. Mendoza has spent the previous years working in the Information Technology field and has worked all over the world (Mexico, Colombia, Brazil, England, and Argentina). Mendoza now owns a local sustainable lawn care business.

Party political offices
Preceded by Stewart Alexander	Socialist Party Vice presidential candidate 2012	Succeeded by Angela Nicole Walker
