= Stewart Alexander =

American politician (born 1951)

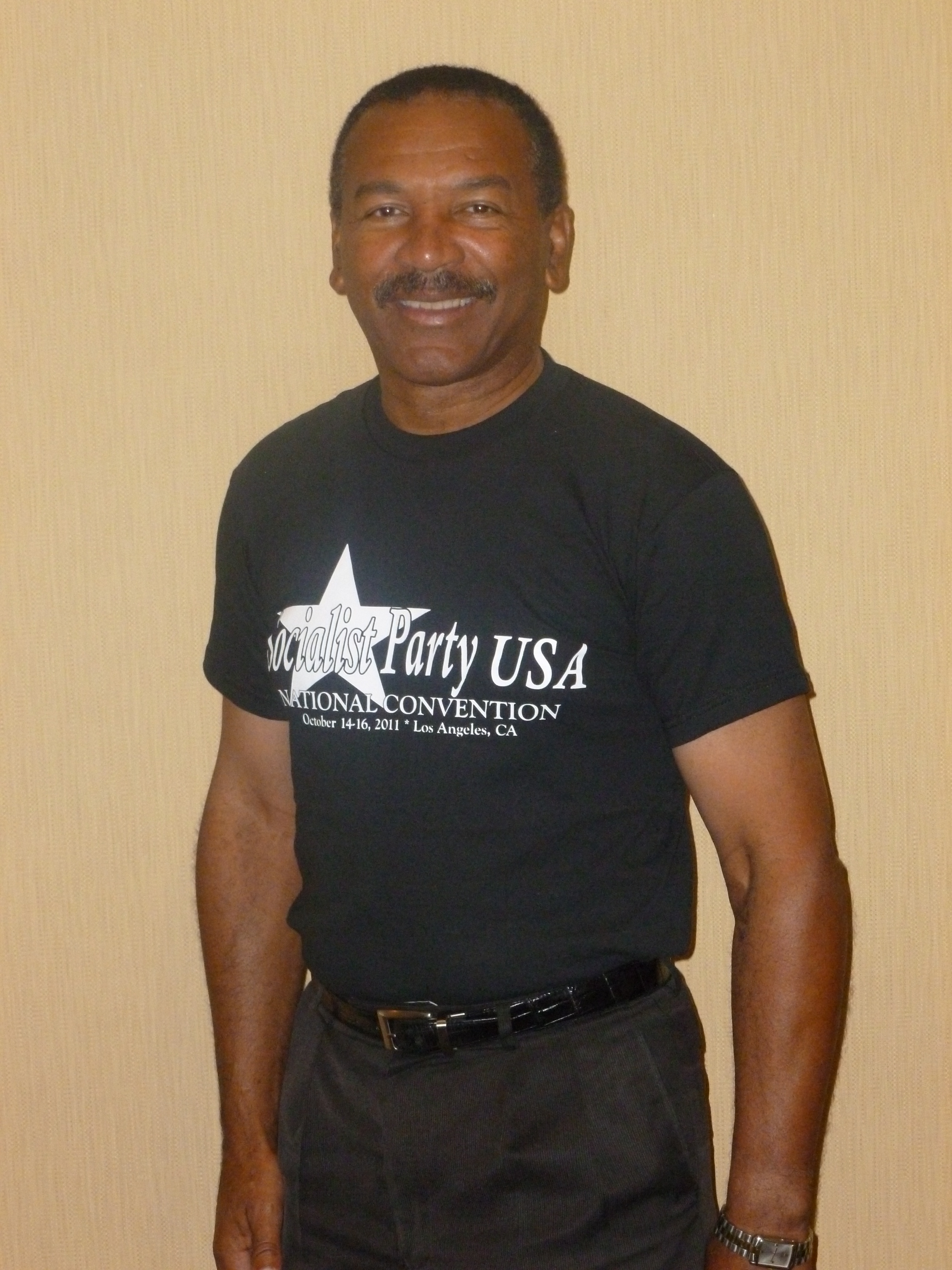
- Alexander in Los Angeles, 2011

Personal details
- Born: October 1, 1951 (age 74) Newport News, Virginia, U.S.
- Party: Socialist
- Other political affiliations: Liberty Union (affiliated non-member); Peace and Freedom (1998–2012); Green (2010–2011)
- Children: 2
- Education: California State University, Dominguez Hills
- Occupation: Political writer, activist, automobile salesperson

Stewart Alexis Alexander (born October 1, 1951) is an American democratic socialist politician, presidential nominee for the Socialist Party USA in the 2012 election, and former SPUSA nominee for Vice President of the United States in the 2008 election.

A resident of California, Alexander was the Peace and Freedom Party candidate for lieutenant governor in 2006. He received 43,319 votes, 0.5% of the total. In August 2010, Alexander declared his candidacy for the President of the United States with the Socialist Party and Green Party. In January 2011, Alexander also declared his candidacy for the presidential nomination of the Peace and Freedom Party.

== Early life ==
Stewart Alexis Alexander was born to Stewart Alexander, a brick mason and minister, and Ann E. McClenney, a nurse and housewife, in the Mary Immaculate Hospital on the banks of the James River, near the Newport News Ship Building and Dry Dock Company, in Newport News, Virginia. Because the facility was then a segregated hospital, young Stewart and his mother were quickly relocated to a basement room.

While in the Air Force Reserve, Alexander worked as a full-time retail clerk at Safeway Stores and then began attending college at California State University, Dominguez Hills. Stewart began working overtime as a stocking clerk with Safeway to support himself through school. During this period he was married to Freda Alexander, his first wife. They had one son.

He was honorably discharged in October 1976 and married for the second time. He left Safeway in 1978 and for a brief period worked as a licensed general contractor. In 1980, he went to work for Lockheed Aircraft but quit the following year.

Returning to Los Angeles, he became involved in several civic organizations, including most notably the NAACP (he became the Labor and Industry Chairman for the Inglewood South Bay Branch of the NAACP).

In 1986 he moved back to Los Angeles and hosted a weekly talk show on KTYM Radio until 1989. The show dealt with social issues affecting Los Angeles such as gangs, drugs, and redevelopment, interviewing government officials from all levels of government and community leaders throughout California. He also worked with Delores Daniels of the NAACP on the radio and in the street.

== Los Angeles mayoral election of 1989 ==
In 1987 he met Norton Halper, a community activist, who convinced him to run for mayor of Los Angeles.

Alexander launched his campaign for mayor of Los Angeles in 1988, personally visiting over 14,000 doors to get the necessary 1,000 signatures to appear on the ballot. Many of his ideas for the campaign came from a hearing of over 200 community activists in Los Angeles, about the city's problems, which he moderated.

His campaign focused on the issue of redevelopment. Stewart felt that the billions of tax dollars spent on redevelopment were wasted on helping wealthy contractors and corporations earn more profits at the expense of the residents who he felt were in need of social programs and employment. Furthermore, his campaign dealt with the issues of crime prevention and the aforementioned social programs. Stewart believes that these social conditions led to the Los Angeles riots of 1992.

Tom Bradley won the election against major opponent Nate Holden. Alexander finished seventh with 2,691 votes (0.84%).

== Later campaigns ==
Alexander became an automobile sales consultant and began looking at other political groups outside of the Democratic and Republican parties. He saw the popularity of independent H. Ross Perot in 1992 and 1996 as proof that America was interested in more as well.

He was the Peace and Freedom party candidate for lieutenant governor in California in 2006, receiving 0.5% of the vote.

In 2008 he was nominated for Vice President of the United States by the Socialist Party USA.

On October 15, 2011, he was nominated for President of the United States by the Socialist Party USA at the party's convention in Los Angeles.

He also unsuccessfully ran for the Peace and Freedom Party nomination for governor in the California gubernatorial election, 2010.

== Presidential campaign ==
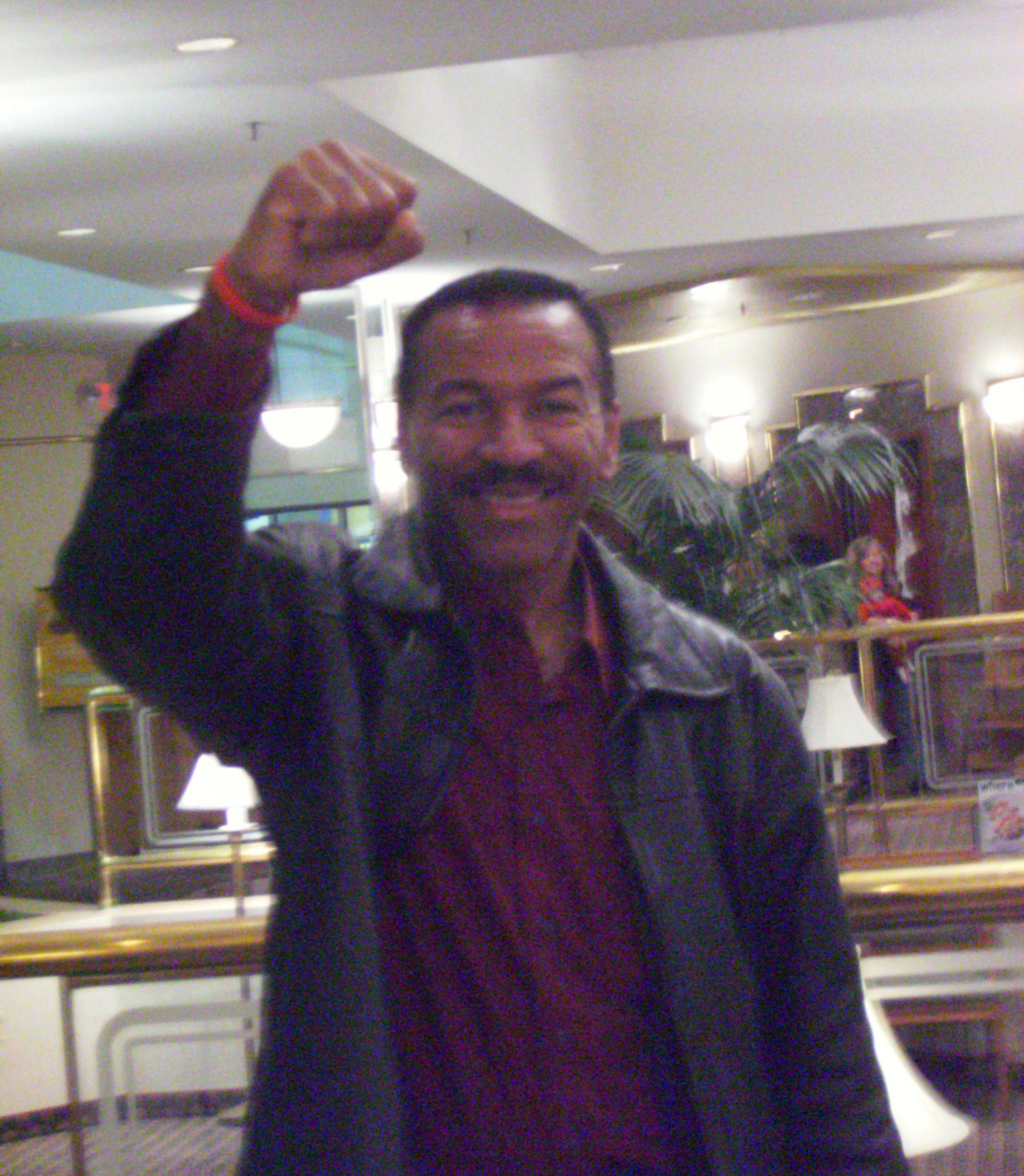
Alexander shortly after his nomination for Vice President of the United States of America at the Socialist Party USA National Convention in St. Louis, MO, October 20, 2007.

At the 2011 Socialist Party USA national convention in Los Angeles, California, Alexander was elected as the party's nominee for President of the United States. He won the nomination in the first round of voting, against former SPUSA co-chair Jerry Levy. Alexander's running-mate for Vice President of the United States was Alejandro Mendoza of Texas.

In August 2012, Alexander sought the nomination of the Peace and Freedom Party, a ballot qualified socialist party in California. Alexander/Mendoza lost the nomination to a ticket of comedian Roseanne Barr and anti-war activist Cindy Sheehan. Shortly thereafter, Alexander resigned from the Steering Committee of the Peace and Freedom Party, citing a lack of support for socialist candidates by the PFP.

== See also ==
- Brian Moore, the Socialist Party's nominee for president in the 2008 election

== Sources ==
- Ballot-Access.org. www.ballot-access.org. Richard Winger.
- Brian Moore Official Campaign Website. www.votebrianmoore.com.
- StewartAlexanderCares.com. www.stewartalexandercares.com. Stewart Alexander.
- Tash, Stephen. "Socialist Party USA Picks its Presidential Ticket for 2008". The Michigan Socialist. End of Year Issue 2007. Accessed March 8, 2008.
- Political profile of Steward Alexander. Accessed November 20, 2011.

Party political offices
Preceded by Mal Herbert	Socialist Party Vice Presidential candidate 2008 (lost)	Succeeded by Alejandro Mendoza
Preceded by Brian Moore	Socialist Party Presidential candidate 2012	Succeeded by Mimi Soltysik
