= 1896 United States presidential election in Texas =

- November 3, 1896

Nominee	William Jennings Bryan	William McKinley
Party	Democratic	Republican
Alliance	Populist
Home state	Nebraska	Ohio
Running mate	Arthur Sewall	Garret Hobart
Electoral vote	15	0
Popular vote	370,434	167,520
Percentage	68.00%	30.75%
County results
Bryan
50–60%
60–70%
70–80%
80–90%
90–100%
McKinley
40–50%
50–60%
60–70%
70–80%
90–100%
President before election
Grover Cleveland
Democratic
Elected President
William McKinley
Republican

The 1896 United States presidential election in Texas took place on November 3, 1896. State voters chose 15 electors to the Electoral College, which selected the president and vice president. Texas was won by the Democratic nominees, former U.S. Representative William Jennings Bryan of Nebraska and his running mate Arthur Sewall of Maine.

== Results ==
1896 United States presidential election in Texas
Party	Candidate	Votes	Percentage	Electoral votes
Democratic	William Jennings Bryan	370,434	68.00%	15
Republican	William McKinley	167,520	30.75%	0
National Democratic	John M. Palmer	5,046	0.93%	0
Prohibition	Joshua Levering	1,786	0.33%	0
Totals		544,786	100.00%	15
Voter turnout				—

== See also ==
- United States presidential elections in Texas
