= Ranch to Market Road 187 =

State road in Texas, United States

Ranch to Market Road 187
- RM 187 highlighted in red

Route information
- Maintained by TxDOT
- Length: 81.93 mi (131.85 km)
- Existed: June 11, 1945–present

Major junctions
- South end: US 57 near Batesville
- US 90 in Sabinal; SH 127 in Sabinal
- North end: SH 39 near Ingram

Location
- Country: United States
- State: Texas
- Counties: Zavala, Uvalde, Bandera, Kerr

Highway system
- Highways in Texas; Interstate; US; State; Former; Toll; Loops; Spurs; FM/RM; Park; Rec
← SH 186	→ SH 188

Ranch to Market Road 187 (RM 187) is an 81.9-mile (131.8 km) Ranch to Market Road located in Zavala, Uvalde, Bandera, and Kerr counties in the US state of Texas. The route passes through the cities of Sabinal, Utopia, and Vanderpool. The road helps connect several small south Texas ranches to major highways. RM 187 was first designated in 1945, and was extended three times during the 1940s. As of 2012, it is the longest Ranch to Market Road in the state of Texas.

== Route description ==
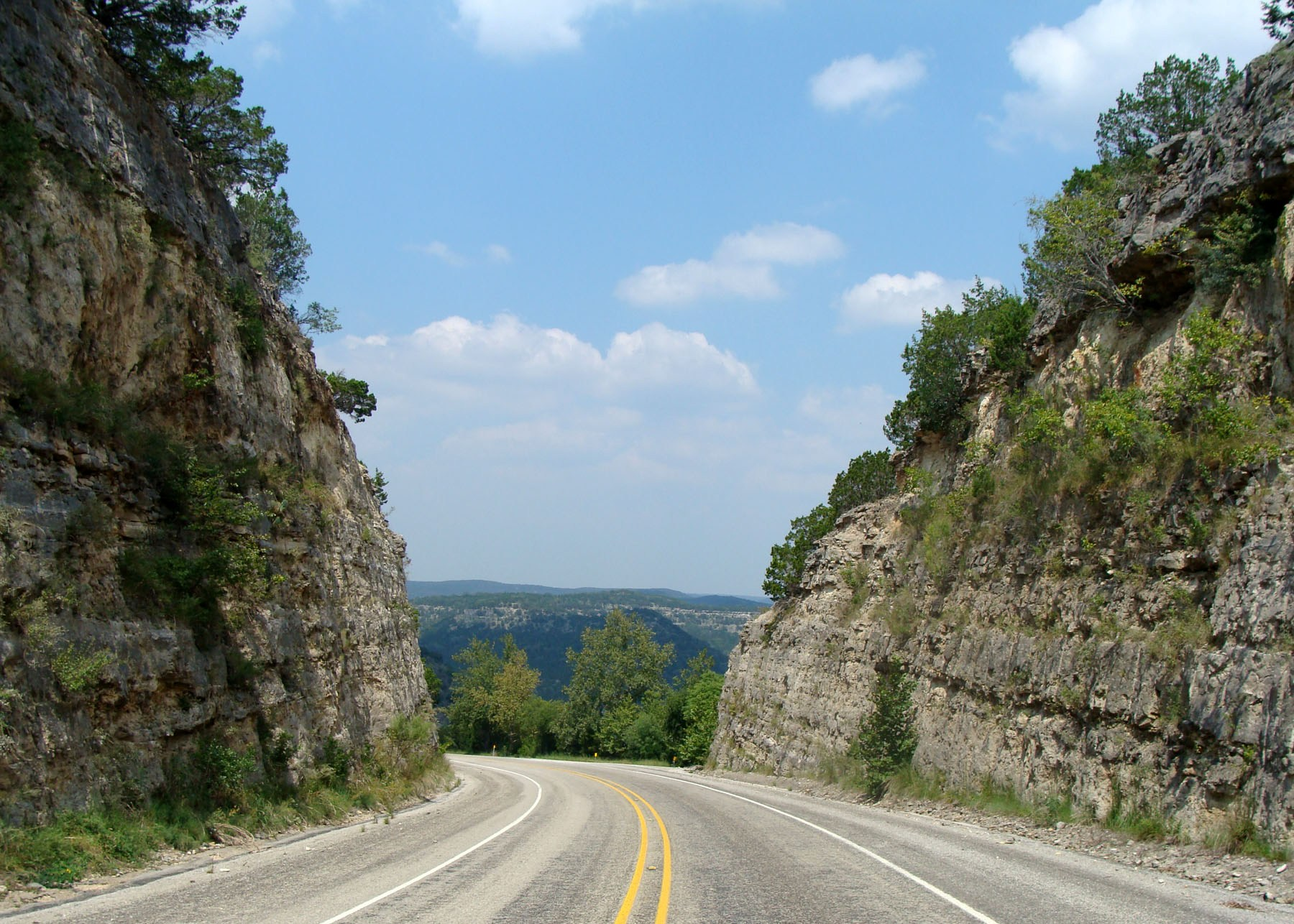
Northbound RM 187, August 2008

RM 187 begins at its southern terminus with US Highway 57 (US 57), near Batesville, as a paved, two-lane, asphalt road. RM 187 winds through several miles of Southern Texas grassland. The highway passes several large ranches and farms along this course and intersects with several county routes and private roads. For this stretch of the route, RM 187 is heading in a northeast direction. The highway turns north about two miles (3 km) south of an intersection with FM 140. The two highways run concurrently for nearly one mile (1.6 km) before FM 140 turns westward. RM 187 continues north through rolling grasslands for almost 3.5 miles (5.6 km) before turning in a northeast direction. The route continues in this direction for about two miles before returning to a northerly direction. After about 15 miles (24 km), RM 187 intersects with US 90 and State Highway 127 (SH 127) in the small town of Sabinal. The highway continues through more hilly, rolling grasslands. A few miles later, the highway crosses the Sabinal River and proceeds past the Waresville cemetery, the Links of Utopia Golf Course, and the Utopia on the River Airport before passing through the "downtown" area of the village of Utopia.

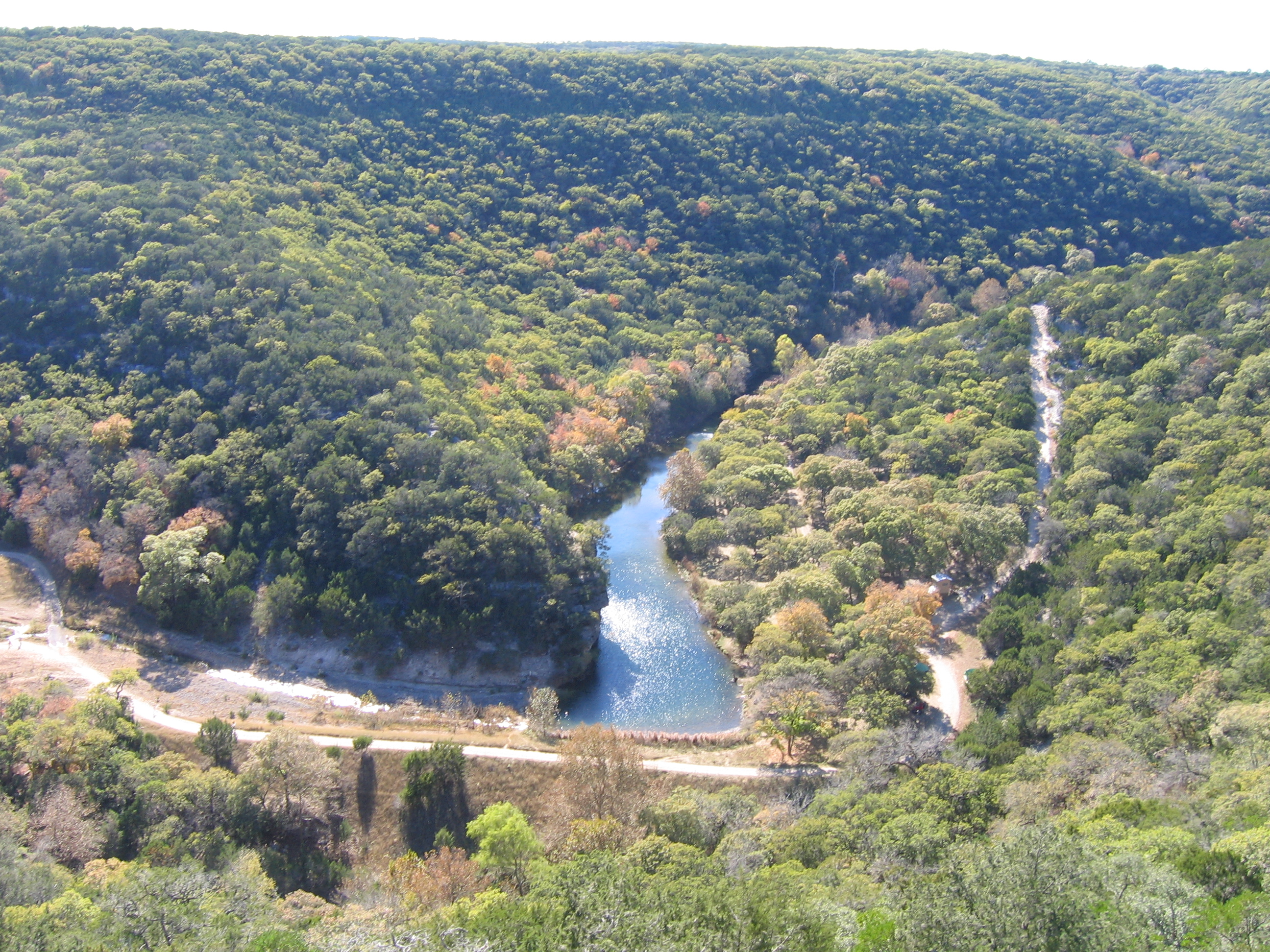
Lost Maples State Natural Area, located off RM 187

RM 187 winds through nearly seven miles (11 km) of brushland, passing several large ranches and farms alongside the Sabinal River. The highway heads through the unincorporated community of Vanderpool and runs concurrently with RM 337 for a length of 1.1 miles (1.8 km). Separating and running northward, RM 187 continues along the southwestern edge of the Lost Maples State Natural Area. The highway turns northeasterly through a long stretch of brushland before reaching its northern terminus at SH 39.

== History ==
RM 187 was designated as Farm to Market Road 187 (FM 187) in Uvalde County on June 11, 1945, from Sabinal to the Bandera County line. On June 25 of that year, it was extended from the Uvalde County line to Vanderpool. The highway was extended from an intersection with US 90 to Garner Field on April 1, 1948, adding approximately 1.8 miles (2.9 km). On November 23, 1948, it was extended to a point 4.3 miles (6.9 km) south of Sabinal, while the previous extension was cancelled and redesignated FM 1023. The route was lengthened southward by 6.7 miles (10.8 km) to a dead end on July 15, 1949. The road was changed to RM 187 in 1953, but was reverted when the road again extended south on March 24, 1954, to an intersection with FM 140, adding approximately 6 miles (9.7 km). On May 2, 1962, FM 187 was extended 4.5 miles (7.2 km) northward, and it was extended to its present northern terminus at SH 39 on June 26, 1963, which added about 12.9 miles (20.8 km) and resulted in the road being changed back to RM 187. On June 21, 1967, FM 2557 was redesignated as part of RM 187, adding approximately 13.5 miles (22 km) and extending it to its current southern terminus at US 57, although this did not take effect until construction on the 8.5-mile (13.7 km) segment from FM 140 to FM 2557 was completed.

== Major junctions ==
County	Location	mi	km	Destinations	Notes
Zavala		0.0	0.0	US 57 – La Pryor, Batesville	Southern terminus
Zavala		12.6	20.3	FM 140 east – Pearsall	South end of FM 140 concurrency
Zavala		13.5	21.7	FM 140 west – Uvalde	North end of FM 140 concurrency
Uvalde	Sabinal	32.9	52.9	US 90 / SH 127 – Uvalde, Hondo	South end of concurrency with SH 127
Uvalde		34.1	54.9	SH 127 north – Concan, Garner State Park	North end of concurrency with SH 127
Uvalde		42.8	68.9	FM 1796 east – D'Hanis	Western terminus of FM 1796
Uvalde	Utopia	54.4	87.5	RM 1050 west – Leakey, Garner State Park	Eastern terminus of RM 1050
Uvalde		56.8	91.4	FM 470 east – Bandera	Western terminus of FM 470
Bandera	Vanderpool	65.0	104.6	RM 337 east – Medina	Southern end of RM 337 concurrency
Bandera		66.1	106.4	RM 337 west – Leakey	Northern end of RM 337 concurrency
Kerr		81.9	131.8	SH 39 to US 83 – Hunt	Northern terminus
1.000 mi = 1.609 km; 1.000 km = 0.621 mi: Concurrency terminus

== See also ==
- List of Farm to Market Roads in Texas
