= Texas State Highway 127 =

State highway in Texas

State Highway 127
- SH 127, highlighted in red

Route information
- Maintained by TxDOT
- Length: 21.217 mi (34.145 km)
- Existed: before 1939–present

Major junctions
- South end: US 90 in Sabinal
- North end: US 83 in Concan

Location
- Country: United States
- State: Texas
- Counties: Uvalde

Highway system
- Highways in Texas; Interstate; US; State; Former; Toll; Loops; Spurs; FM/RM; Park; Rec
← SH 126	→ SH 128

State Highway 127 (SH 127) is a state highway in Uvalde County in the U.S. state of Texas that connects Sabinal and Concan in south Texas.

== Route description ==
SH 127 begins in Sabinal at an intersection with US 90 and RM 187. The highway travels north through Sabinal along Center Street, concurrent with RM 187, before separating from that route and turning toward the northwest. After crossing the Sabinal River, the highway travels through unincorporated Uvalde County, intersecting FM 30, FM 1049, and RM 2690. The route crosses the Frio River at Concan before ending at a junction with US 83.

== History ==

The original SH 127 was designated on October 10, 1927 as a proposed route from Cotulla eastward through Tilden to Oakville. It was officially numbered SH 127 on November 15, 1927. On August 6, 1929, it was extended northwest to SH 85. This route was cancelled on October 22, 1930, because La Salle county could not join the state to construct SH 2, so it was cancelled. This route was mostly restored starting on January 9, 1934, as SH 202. The current route of SH 127 was then designated on June 11, 1932.

== Major intersections ==
The entire route is in Uvalde County.

Location	mi	km	Destinations	Notes
Sabinal	0.0	0.0	US 90 / RM 187 south – Uvalde, Hondo	Southern terminus; south end of RM 187 concurrency
	1.2	1.9	RM 187 north – Utopia	North end of RM 187 concurrency
	3.1	5.0	FM 30	
	12.4	20.0	FM 1049 – Knippa	
	16.0	25.7	RM 2690	
Concan	21.2	34.1	US 83 – Uvalde, Leakey	Northern terminus
1.000 mi = 1.609 km; 1.000 km = 0.621 mi
