= Ranch to Market Road 337 =

State road in Real and Bandera counties in Texas, United States

Ranch to Market Road 337

Route information
- Maintained by TxDOT
- Length: 56.101 mi (90.286 km)
- Existed: 1945–present
- History: 1945: Established as FM 337; 1956: Redesignated as RM 337; 1975: Former FM 1336 added

Major junctions
- West end: SH 55 in Camp Wood
- US 83 in Leakey
- East end: SH 16 in Medina

Location
- Country: United States
- State: Texas
- Counties: Real, Bandera

Highway system
- Highways in Texas; Interstate; US; State; Former; Toll; Loops; Spurs; FM/RM; Park; Rec
← RM 336	→ FM 338

Ranch to Market Road 337 (RM 337) is a ranch-to-market road in Real and Bandera counties in Texas, United States, that connects Texas State Highway 55 (SH 55) in Camp Wood with Texas State Highway 16 (SH 16) in Medina. Passing through the canyonland of the Texas Hill Country northwest of San Antonio, the route is noted for its scenery. RM 337 was designated in 1945 between Camp Wood and Leakey in Real County. It was extended eastward several times in the 1950s and 1960s, reaching its present length in 1975.

== Route description ==
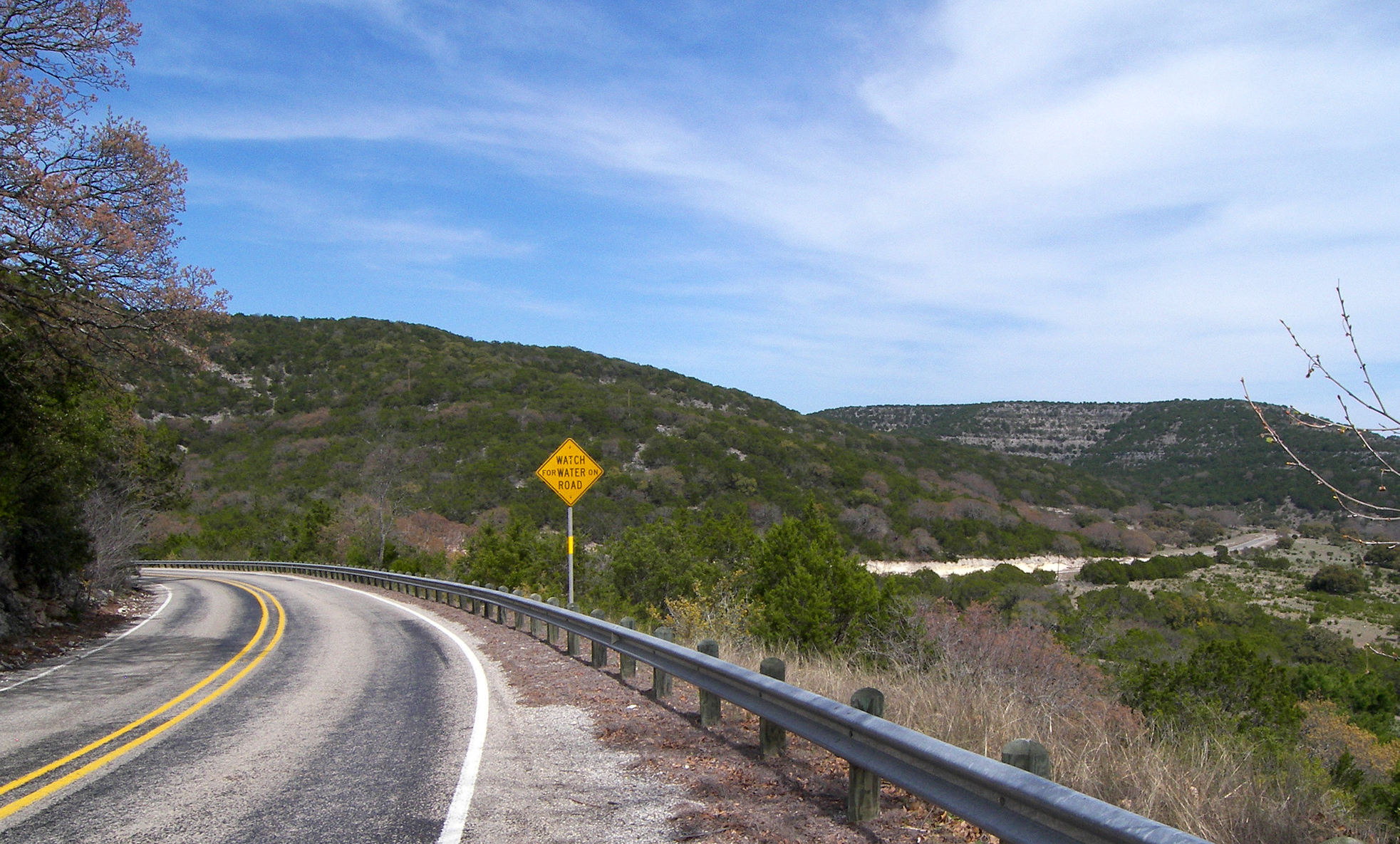
East on RM 337 about 4 miles (6.4 km) west of Leakey, March 2010

RM 337 begins at SH 55 in Camp Wood. The highway travels as a two-lane road along East 4th Street for a few blocks before leaving the city; leaving Camp Wood, the highway's route becomes rural and passes by many ranches and small subdivisions. RM 337 crosses Camp Wood Creek twice with the route traversing through hilly areas after the second crossing. The next several miles of the highway feature sharp curves as the roadway travels up and down steep hills. RM 337 straightens out near John Buchanan Road and travels through a more flat area then enters the Leakey city limits near an intersection with Patterson Creek Road.

In Leakey, the highway travels along 6th Street and intersects US 83, leaving the city limits near a crossing with the Frio River. East of Leakey, RM 337 continues to travel through hilly areas for several miles before meeting RM 187 near the Lost Maples State Natural Area. The two highways share an overlap for about a mile before RM 337 leaves the overlap at Vanderpool. RM 337 crosses the Sabinal River just east of RM 187 then travels through rural areas of Bandera County, passing by several ranches. The highway starts to parallel the West Prong Medina River at the Wheeler Road intersection and continues to run parallel to the river for about the next 12 miles (19 km). RM 337 crosses the North Prong Medina River then enters the community of Medina, ending at an intersection with SH 16.

RM 337 is known for its hairpin switchbacks and natural environment; it has been called one of the most scenic drives in Texas. Texas Monthly magazine named the road no. 18 on its list of "75 Things We Love About Texas" in its April 2006 issue. Ranch to Market Road 337 together with Ranch to Market Road 336 and Ranch to Market Road 335 form a scenic loop nicknamed the "Twisted Sisters".

== History ==
The route was first designated on June 11, 1945, as Farm to Market Road 337 (FM 337), traveling from Camp Wood to Leakey. It was redesignated RM 337 on October 1, 1956. On October 31, 1957, it was extended 6.5 miles (10.5 km) eastward, and on September 27, 1960, the route was extended another 3 miles (4.8 km) eastward. On October 1, 1968, the highway was extended eastward 8 miles (13 km) to RM 187. On December 25, 1975, the former FM 1336 from SH 16 to RM 187 was redesignated as part of RM 337, adding 19.5 miles (31.4 km) to the route.

== Junction list ==
County	Location	mi	km	Destinations	Notes
Real	Camp Wood	0.000	0.000	West Fourth Street	Continuation west from western terminus
Real	Camp Wood	0.000	0.000	SH 55 north (Nueces Street) – Barksdale, Rocksprings SH 55 south (Nueces Street) – Montell, Uvalde	Western terminus
Real	Leakey	21.314	34.302	US 83 north (Market Street) – Junction, Menard US 83 south (Market Street) – Uvalde, Crystal City	
Bandera		36.517	58.768	RM 187 north – Lost Maples State Natural Area, SH 39	Northern end of RM 187 concurrency
Bandera	Vanderpool	37.716	60.698	RM 187 south – Utopia, Sabinal	Southern end of RM 187 concurrency
Bandera	Medina	56.101	90.286	SH 16 north (Broadway Street) – Kerrville SH 16 south (Broadway Street) – Bandera, San Antonio	Eastern terminus; T intersection
1.000 mi = 1.609 km; 1.000 km = 0.621 mi: Concurrency terminus

== See also ==
- List of state highways in Texas
