= National Register of Historic Places listings in Real County, Texas =

Location of Real County in Texas

This is a list of the National Register of Historic Places listings in Real County, Texas.

This is intended to be a complete list of properties and districts listed on the National Register of Historic Places in Real County, Texas. There is one property listed on the National Register in the county.

This National Park Service list is complete through NPS recent listings posted March 21, 2025.

== Current listings ==
The locations of National Register properties may be seen in a mapping service provided.

| | Name on the Register | Image | Date listed | Location | City or town | Description |
|---|---|---|---|---|---|---|
| 1 | Mission San Lorenzo de la Santa Cruz | Mission San Lorenzo de la Santa Cruz | July 14, 1971 (#71000958) | Off State Hwy 55 north of Camp Wood; 29°40′37″N 100°00′54″W | Camp Wood | |

== See also ==
- National Register of Historic Places listings in Texas
- Recorded Texas Historic Landmarks in Real County
