= Aldine, Uvalde County, Texas =

Ghost town in Texas, US

- Ghost town
- Location within Texas
- Coordinates: 29.50605400°N 99.78429900°W
- Country: United States
- State: Texas
- County: Uvalde

Aldine is a ghost town in Uvalde County, Texas, United States. Situated on Farm to Market Road 1051 and the Frio River, it was settled c. 1880, and a post office operated there from 1885 to 1891. A school operated by 1900 and until 1971, with the community being abandoned by 1988.
