= Leakey Independent School District =

School district in Texas, United States

The Leakey Independent School District is a public school district based in Leakey, Texas, US.

The district is located primarily in Real County with a small portion extending into north central Uvalde County. The unincorporated community of Rio Frio also lies within the boundaries of Leakey ISD.

Students in grades Kindergarten through twelve are housed on a single campus, Leakey School, which is located along U.S. Highway 83 (Market Street) in the city of Leakey.

In 2009, the school district was rated "academically acceptable" by the Texas Education Agency.

== History ==
The history of education in Leakey dates back to the 1880s. Prior to this period, most area children were home schooled. In 1883, John and Nancy Leakey deeded land to John I. Avant, W.B. Burditt, and J.B. Johnson, who went on to establish the Floral Academy near the present-day city of Leakey. By 1887, the school had a total enrollment of 22. That same year, the property was transferred to Edwards County officials for use as the Leakey School. A second school building was completed in 1890. Leakey School continued to grow and by 1902, enrollment had risen to 102. In 1913, Real County was created with Leakey as the county seat.

Real County Judge Ed Kelly established the Leakey Independent School District in 1919. Land for a new school building was donated by A.G. Weston and it opened in 1922. A larger campus was constructed in 1930. Soon after, a number of smaller schools consolidated with Leakey, including West Frio, Cypress Creek, Rio Frio, Exile, Stanford, Dry Frio, and Harper. A twelve-grade system was instituted in 1941.

== Athletics ==
Leakey High School won the 1975 state eight-man football championship, the last year that this version of football was played in Texas. It switched to eleven-man football the following year; there were few teams playing six-man football near Leakey, so it chose the higher classification even though it could have played six-man football. As a result, the school's team struggled; from 1998 to 2018 it won one season, and it had not scored many other season wins since 1975. In fall 2018 the Leakey ISD board of education voted to make the football team six-man due to the poor athletic performance of the eleven-man team and because nearby Medina High School and Nueces Canyon High School now had six-man teams.

== Student demographics ==
As of the 2007-2008 school year, the Leakey Independent School District had a total enrollment of 245 students.

- By Ethnicity
  - Whites: 175 (71.43%)
  - Hispanics: 66 (26.94%)
  - African Americans: 3 (1.22%)
  - Native American: 1 (0.41%)
- Socio-Economic Groups
  - Economic Disadvantaged: 127 (51.84%)
  - Limited English Proficient: 10 (4.08%)
  - Students w/Disciplinary Placements (2006–07): 2 (0.82%)
  - "At-Risk": 76 (31.02%)

== See also ==
- List of school districts in Texas
