= Vanderpool, Texas =

- Unincorporated community
- Location within Texas Location within the United States
- Coordinates: 29°44′43″N 99°33′18″W
- Country: United States
- State: Texas
- County: Bandera
- Elevation: 1,578 ft (481 m)
- Time zone: UTC-6 (Central (CST))
  - Summer (DST): UTC-5 (CDT)
- Area code: 830
- GNIS feature ID: 1379206

Vanderpool is a small unincorporated community in Bandera County in the Texas Hill Country, United States, which is part of the Edwards Plateau. Although it is unincorporated, Vanderpool has a post office, with the ZIP code of 78885. According to the Handbook of Texas, Vanderpool had a population of 22 in 1990. Hunting, ranching and tourism are prime contributors to the regional economy.

== Geography ==
Vanderpool is located along the Sabinal River in the Sabinal Canyon. It is in western Bandera County at the intersection of Texas State Highway 187 and Ranch to Market Road 337.

=== Climate ===
The climate in this area is characterized by hot, humid summers and generally mild to cool winters. According to the Köppen Climate Classification system, Vanderpool has a humid subtropical climate, abbreviated "Cfa" on climate maps.

== Education ==
The Utopia Independent School District serves students in the area.

== Attractions ==
Vanderpool is home to the Lone Star Motorcycle Museum, which features over 50 classic motorcycles from 1910 to the modern era. Lost Maples State Park is located a few miles north of town. Garner State Park, in which the Green kingfisher can be spotted, is about a 30-minute drive to the southwest. It is a popular birdwatching destination for American and foreign tourists.
