= Rio Frio, Texas =

Unincorporated community in Texas, United States

Rio Frio
- Unincorporated community
- Location within the state of Texas Rio Frio (the United States)
- Coordinates: 29°38′10″N 99°44′12″W
- Country: United States
- State: Texas
- County: Real
- Elevation: 1,483 ft (452 m)
- Time zone: UTC-6 (Central (CST))
  - Summer (DST): UTC-5 (CDT)
- ZIP codes: 78879
- GNIS feature ID: 1345243

Rio Frio is an unincorporated community in southeastern Real County, Texas, United States. It lies just off U.S. Route 83, south of the city of Leakey, the county seat of Real County. It has a post office, with the ZIP code 78879. The town is named after the Frio River, on which it is situated.
