= Texas State Highway 55 =

State highway in Texas

State Highway 55

Route information
- Maintained by TxDOT
- Length: 99.4 mi (160.0 km)
- Existed: 1923–present

Major junctions
- Northwest end: US 277
- US 377 at Rocksprings
- Southeast end: US 83 at Uvalde

Location
- Country: United States
- State: Texas

Highway system
- Highways in Texas; Interstate; US; State; Former; Toll; Loops; Spurs; FM/RM; Park; Rec
← SH 54	→ SH 56

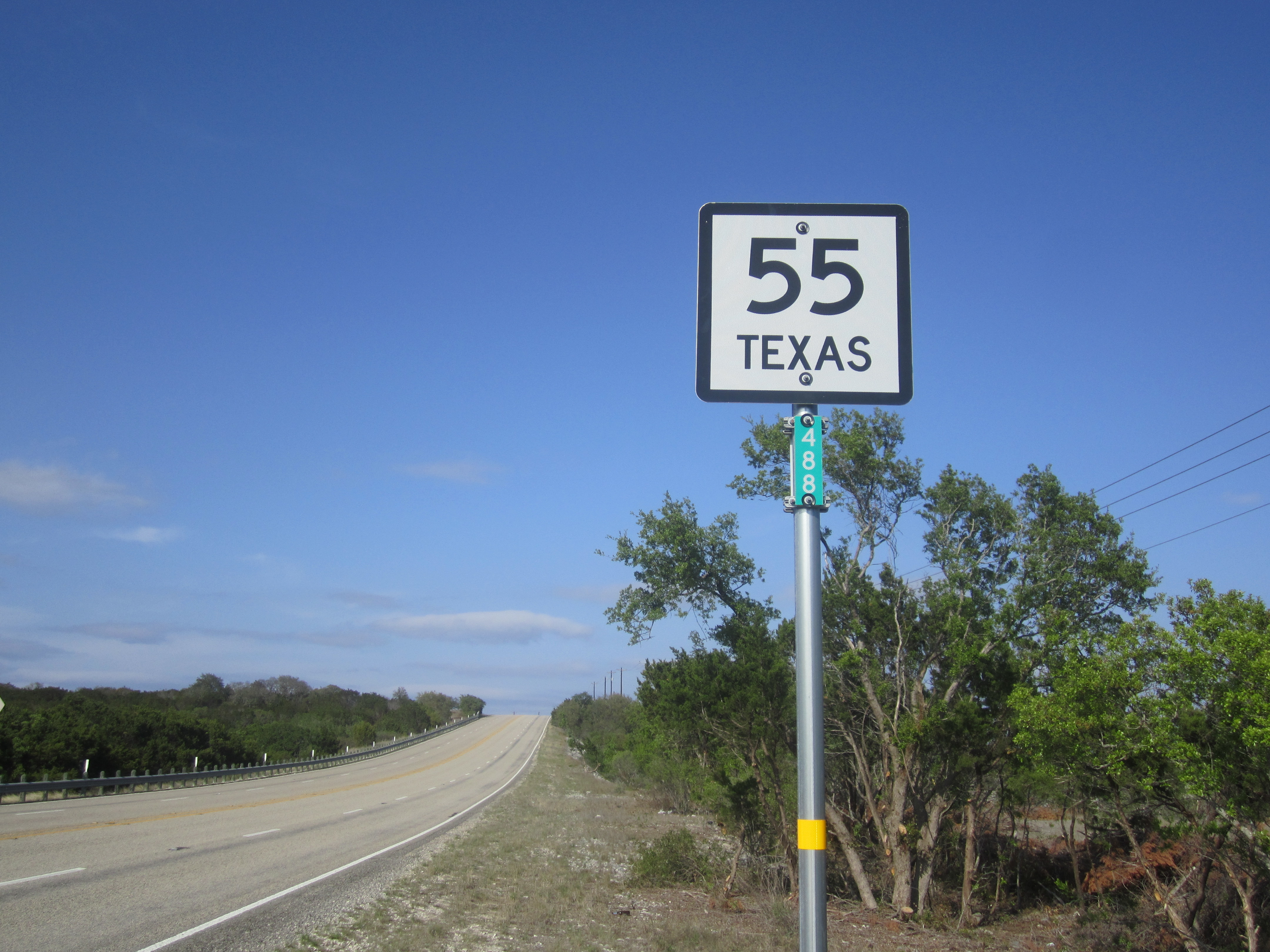
State Highway 55 in the Texas Hill Country

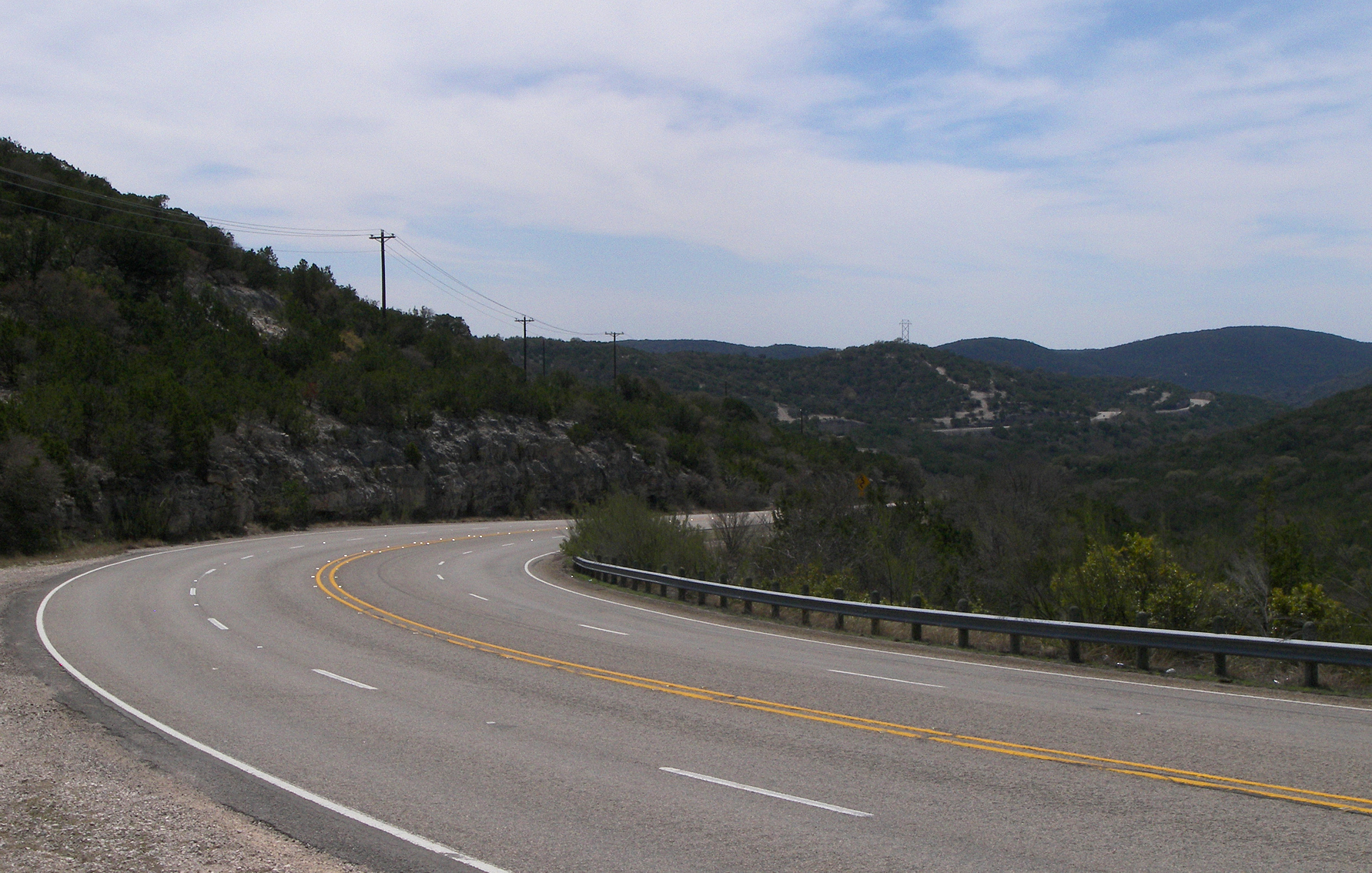
Highway 55 winding through the Hill Country about twelve miles southeast of Rocksprings

State Highway 55 (SH 55) is a state highway in the U.S. state of Texas. It runs from Uvalde northwestward through the western Hill Country onto the Edwards Plateau, ending south of Sonora.

== History ==
Historic SH 55

SH 55 was designated from Uvalde to La Pryor on August 21, 1923, replacing SH 3E. On March 16, 1925, it was extended south to SH 2 near Cactus. On October 26, 1925, it was extended north to Rocksprings. On October 26, 1926, it was rerouted to Bart. On October 10, 1927, it was extended south through Catarina and then east to Artesia Wells. On August 6, 1929 (effective on September 1), SH 55 was truncated to Uvalde, with everything south of there being transferred to SH 4, and the section from Catarina to Artesia Wells was cancelled in exchange for the extension of SH 4. On October 25, 1932, SH 55 extended north to its current terminus. On November 30, 1932, SH 55 was extended south through Batesville and Dilley to San Diego. On July 15, 1935, SH 55 was shortened to a route from Rocksprings to Uvalde as the route to SH 30 (now US 277) had not yet been built. On January 18, 1937, SH 55 extended to Dilley again. On February 11, 1937, SH 55 extended back north to SH 30. The portion from Uvalde to 4.8 miles southeast of Batesville and from Divot to Dilley were to be constructed starting on March 26, 1942, but upon completion, these sections of SH 55 were to be cancelled and changed to Farm to Market Roads. The section south of Uvalde was cancelled on January 11, 1945, and the portion from Uvalde to 4.8 miles south of Batesville was transferred to FM 117. The section from Dilley to Divot was still under construction, but changed to FM 471 (now FM 117) on July 9, 1945.

== Junction list ==
County	Location	mi	km	Destinations	Notes
Uvalde	Uvalde			US 83	
Uvalde				RM 334 west	Eastern terminus of RM 334
Real	Camp Wood			RM 337 east	Western terminus of RM 337
Edwards	Barksdale			RM 335 north	Southern terminus of RM 335
Edwards	Rocksprings			US 377 north	Eastern end of US 377 concurrency
Edwards	Rocksprings			US 377 south	Western end of US 377 concurrency
Edwards				US 277	
1.000 mi = 1.609 km; 1.000 km = 0.621 mi: Concurrency terminus
