= Sabinal Independent School District =

School district in Texas

Address
- 409 West Cullins Avenue Sabinal, Texas, 78881; United States

District information
- Type: Public
- Grades: PK–12
- Schools: 2
- NCES District ID: 4838430

Students and staff
- Students: 462 (2025–2026)
- Teachers: 38.77 (on an FTE basis) (2025–2026)
- Staff: 58.21 (on an FTE basis) (2025–2026)
- Student–teacher ratio: 11.92 (2025–2026)

Other information
- Website: www.sabinalisd.net

Sabinal Independent School District is a public school district based in Sabinal, Texas (United States).

The district has three campuses - Sabinal High (Grades 9-12), Sabinal Junior High (Grades 6-8), and Sabinal Elementary (Grades PK-5).

In 2009 the school district was rated "academically acceptable" by the Texas Education Agency.

== Controversy ==
In July 2024, the ACLU of Texas sent Sabinal Independent School District a letter, alleging that the district's 2023-2024 dress and grooming code appeared to violate the Texas CROWN Act, a state law which prohibits racial discrimination based on hair texture or styles, and asking the district to revise its policies for the 2024-2025 school year.
