= Blanco Creek =

Stream in Texas, USA

Blanco Creek Tributary to Frio River
- Map

Location
- Country: United States
- State: Texas
- County: Uvalde

Physical characteristics
- Source: Bear Creek divide
  - location: about 5 miles southwest of Utopia, Texas
  - coordinates: 29°35′11.82″N 099°36′42.18″W
  - elevation: 2,040 ft (620 m)
- Mouth: Frio River
  - location: about 20 miles southeast of Uvalde, Texas
  - coordinates: 29°06′16.87″N 099°27′19.17″W
  - elevation: 659 ft (201 m)
- Length: 48.98 mi (78.83 km)
- Basin size: 145.32 square miles (376.4 km^{2})
- Discharge
  - location: Frio River
  - average: 29.78 cu ft/s (0.843 m^{3}/s) at mouth with Frio River

Basin features
- Progression: Frio River → Nueces River → Nueces Bay → Corpus Christi Bay → Gulf of Mexico
- River system: Frio River
- Tributaries
  - left: Bailey Creek; Hackberry Creek; Dinner Creek
  - right: Little Blanco Creek
- Bridges: County Road 336 (x15), TX 127, County Road 339A, unnamed road, County Road 342 (x2), unnamed road, County Road 341, US 90, County Road 301, unnamed road

Blanco Creek is a 48.98 mi (78.83 km) long fifth-order tributary to the Frio River in Uvalde County, Texas.

== Variant names ==
According to the Geographic Names Information System, it has also been known historically as:

- Big Blanco Creek
- Blanco River

== Course ==
Blanco Creek rises about 5 miles southwest of Utopia, Texas in Uvalde County, Texas and then flows south-southeast to join the Frio River about 20 miles southwest of Uvalde, Texas.

== Watershed ==
Blanco Creek drains 145.32 square miles (376.4 km^{2}) of area, receives about 28.7 in/year of precipitation, and is about 13.18% forested.

== See also ==
- List of rivers of Texas
