= Real County, Texas =

County in Texas, United States

- County
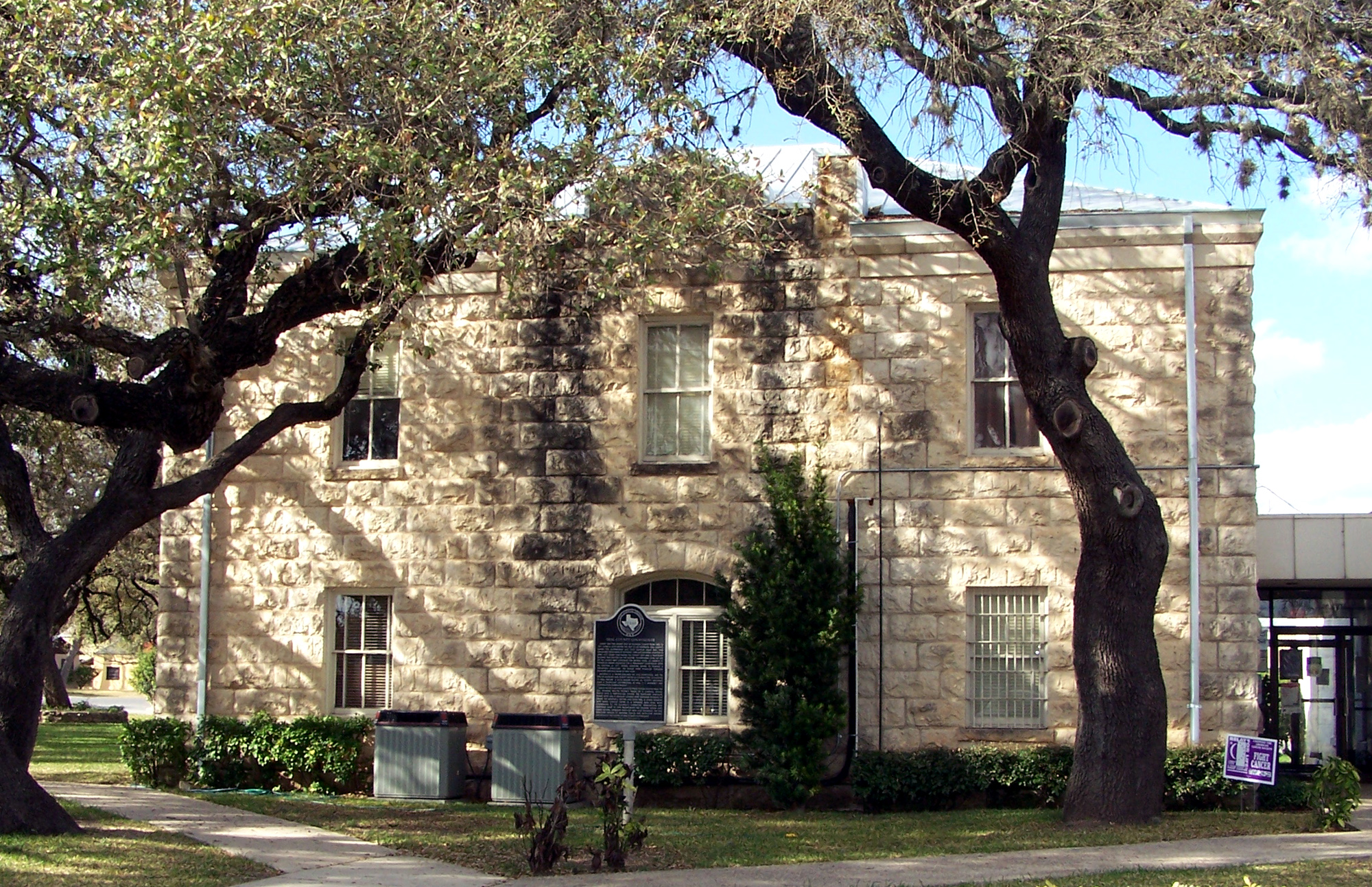
- The Real County Courthouse in Leakey, built in 1918 from local limestone, and renovated in 1978

- Location within the U.S. state of Texas
- Coordinates: 29°50′N 99°49′W
- Country: United States
- State: Texas
- Founded: 1913
- Named for: Julius Real
- Seat: Leakey
- Largest city: Camp Wood

Area
  - Total: 700 sq mi (1,813 km^{2})
  - Land: 699 sq mi (1,810 km^{2})
  - Water: 0.9 sq mi (2.3 km^{2})

Population (2020)
  - Total: 2,758
  - Estimate (2025): 2,745 ▼
  - Density: 3.940/sq mi (1.521/km^{2})
- Time zone: UTC−6 (Central)
  - Summer (DST): UTC−5 (CDT)
- Congressional district: 21st
- Website: www.co.real.tx.us

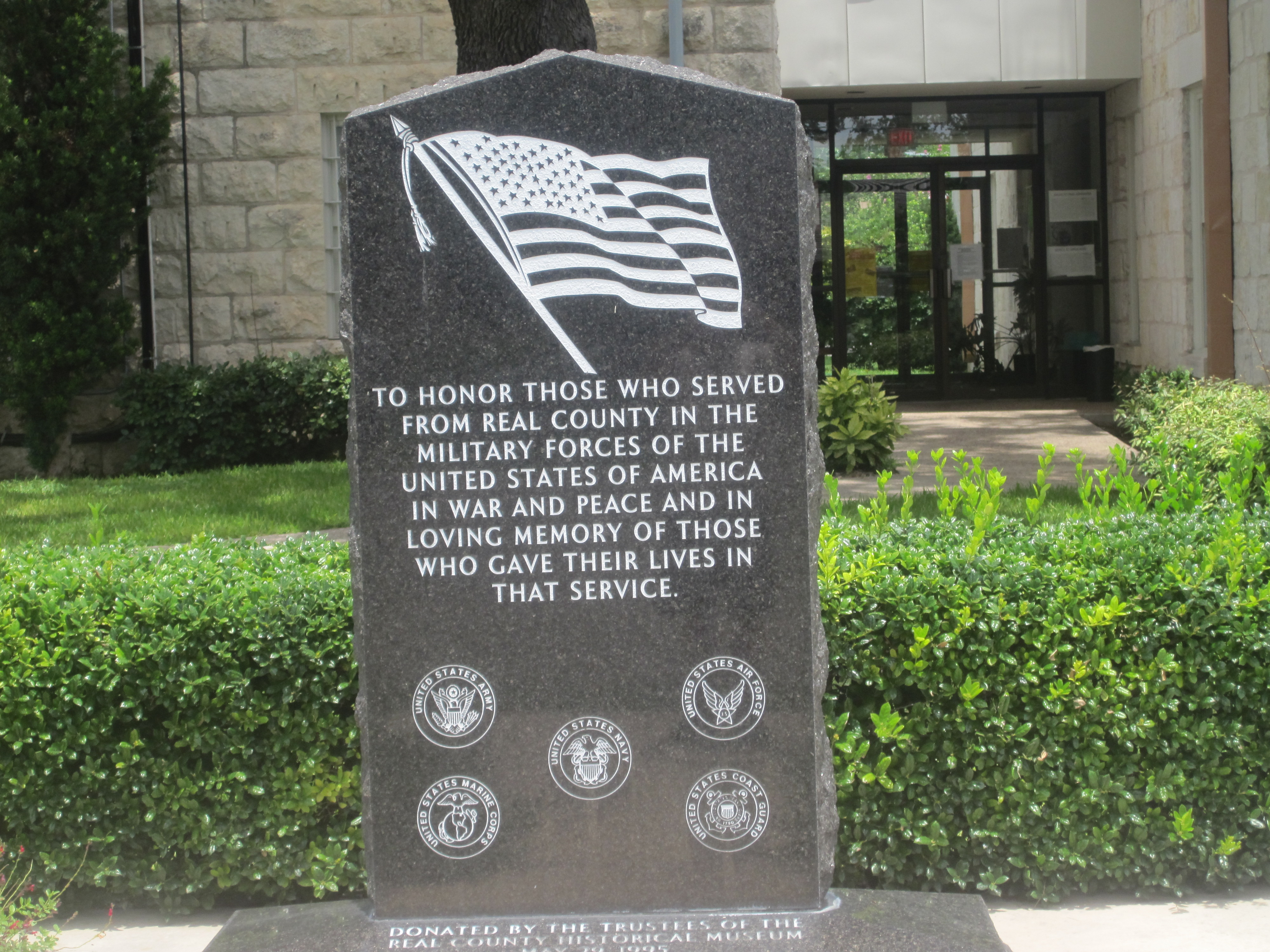
Veterans Memorial at Real County courthouse

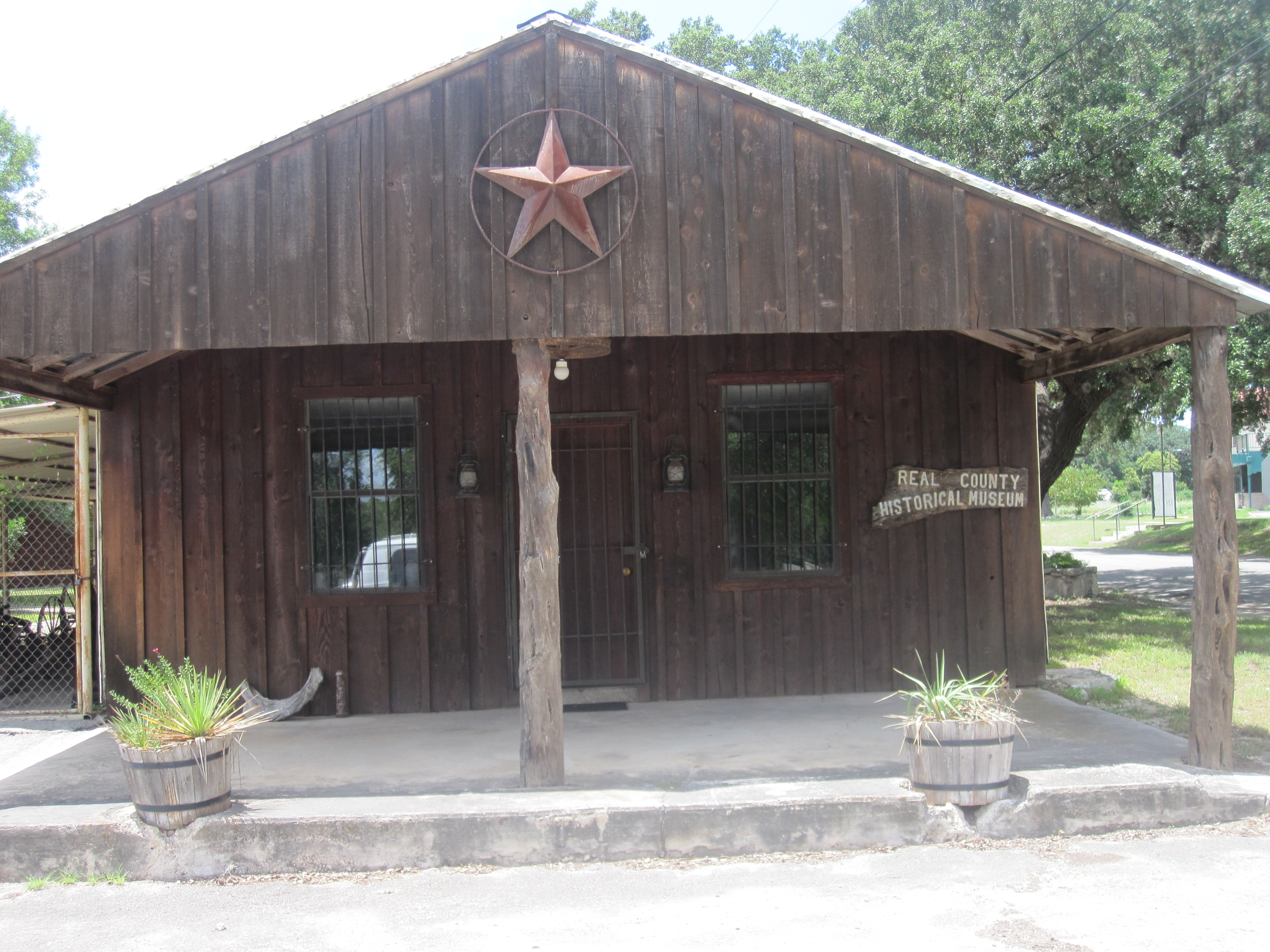
The Real County Historical Museum is located in a rustic building in Leakey.

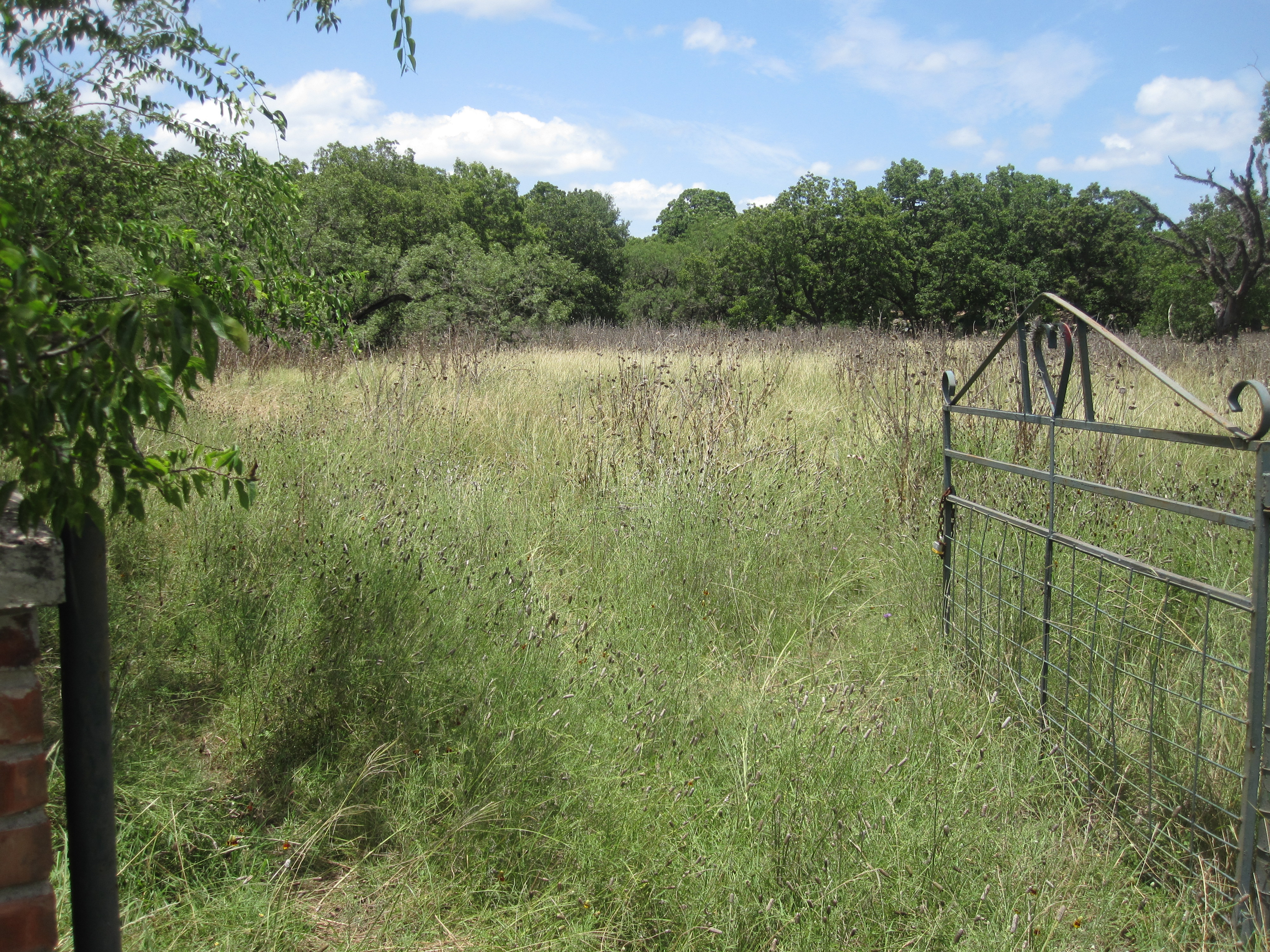
Open gate to a grassy field in Real County

Real County (locally ɹiːˈæɫ ree-AL) is a county located on the Edwards Plateau in the U.S. state of Texas. As of the 2020 census, its population was 2,758. The county seat is Leakey. The county is named for Julius Real (1860–1944), a former member of the Texas State Senate. The Alto Frio Baptist Encampment is located in an isolated area of Real County southeast of Leakey.

== History ==
- 1762–1771: Looking for protection from Comanches, Lipan Apache chief El Gran Cabezón persuades Franciscans and the Spanish military to establish San Lorenzo de la Santa Cruz Mission on the Nueces River. The mission was abandoned in 1771
- 1856: John and Nancy Leakey settle in Frio Canyon.
- 1857: The original Camp Wood is established on the Nueces River near the site of the former San Lorenzo mission.
- 1864: Lipan Apaches attack the family of George Schwander in the abandoned ruins of the San Lorenzo mission.
- 1868: Theophilus Watkins, F. Smith and Newman Patterson construct a gravity flow irrigation canal from the Frio River that operates for a century.
- 1879: Indians attack and kill Jennie Coalson, wife of Nic Coalson, and two children at Half Moon Prairie.
- 1881: Lipan Apaches strike the McLauren home at Buzzard's Roost in the Frio Canyon. Last Indian raid in southwest Texas.
- 1910: Crop farming declines in the county, livestock ranching gains prominence, in particular angora goats.
- 1913: On April 3, the Texas state legislature establishes Real County from parts of Edwards, Bandera, and Kerr counties. Leakey is the county seat.
- 1920: Camp Wood township is founded and becomes a railroad terminus to transport heart cedar.
- 1924: Charles A. Lindbergh lands in Real County.
- 1948: Farm to Market Road 337 is completed.

== Geography ==
According to the U.S. Census Bureau, the county has a total area of 700.1 square miles (1,813 km^{2}), of which 699 square miles (1,810 km^{2}) is land and 0.9 square miles (2.3 km^{2}) (0.1%) is water.

=== Major highways ===
- U.S. Highway 83
- State Highway 41
- State Highway 55
- Ranch to Market Road 337

=== Adjacent counties ===
- Edwards County (west)
- Kerr County (northeast)
- Bandera County (east)
- Uvalde County (south)

== Demographics ==
Historical population
Census	Pop.	Note	%±
1920	1,461		—
1930	2,197		50.4%
1940	2,420		10.2%
1950	2,479		2.4%
1960	2,079		−16.1%
1970	2,013		−3.2%
1980	2,469		22.7%
1990	2,412		−2.3%
2000	3,047		26.3%
2010	3,309		8.6%
2020	2,758		−16.7%
2025 (est.)	2,745	▼	−0.5%
U.S. Decennial Census; 1850–2010 2010 2020

=== 2020 census ===
As of the 2020 census, the county had a population of 2,758. The median age was 56.3 years, with 17.3% of residents under the age of 18 and 34.3% of residents 65 years of age or older. For every 100 females there were 103.2 males, and for every 100 females age 18 and over there were 99.0 males age 18 and over.

The racial makeup of the county was 80.2% White, 1.0% Black or African American, 0.7% American Indian and Alaska Native, 0.5% Asian, 0.1% Native Hawaiian and Pacific Islander, 5.6% from some other race, and 11.8% from two or more races. Hispanic or Latino residents of any race comprised 25.1% of the population.

<0.1% of residents lived in urban areas, while 100.0% lived in rural areas.

There were 1,164 households in the county, of which 21.8% had children under the age of 18 living in them. Of all households, 50.8% were married-couple households, 18.7% were households with a male householder and no spouse or partner present, and 25.3% were households with a female householder and no spouse or partner present. About 28.2% of all households were made up of individuals and 16.2% had someone living alone who was 65 years of age or older.

There were 1,656 housing units, of which 29.7% were vacant. Among occupied housing units, 80.7% were owner-occupied and 19.3% were renter-occupied. The homeowner vacancy rate was 2.1% and the rental vacancy rate was 8.8%.

=== Racial and ethnic composition ===
Real County, Texas – Racial and ethnic composition Note: the US Census treats Hispanic/Latino as an ethnic category. This table excludes Latinos from the racial categories and assigns them to a separate category. Hispanics/Latinos may be of any race.
Race / Ethnicity (NH = Non-Hispanic)	Pop 1980	Pop 1990	Pop 2000	Pop 2010	Pop 2020	% 1980	% 1990	% 2000	% 2010	% 2020
White alone (NH)	1,901	1,814	2,306	2,398	1,940	76.99%	75.21%	75.68%	72.47%	70.34%
Black or African American alone (NH)	1	0	5	20	22	0.04%	0.00%	0.16%	0.60%	0.80%
Native American or Alaska Native alone (NH)	13	23	12	23	8	0.53%	0.95%	0.39%	0.70%	0.29%
Asian alone (NH)	1	0	6	2	12	0.04%	0.00%	0.20%	0.06%	0.44%
Native Hawaiian or Pacific Islander alone (NH)	x	x	1	12	3	x	x	0.03%	0.36%	0.11%
Other race alone (NH)	1	1	0	1	2	0.04%	0.04%	0.00%	0.03%	0.07%
Mixed race or Multiracial (NH)	x	x	29	39	79	x	x	0.95%	1.18%	2.86%
Hispanic or Latino (any race)	552	574	688	814	692	22.36%	23.80%	22.58%	24.60%	25.09%
Total	2,469	2,412	3,047	3,309	2,758	100.00%	100.00%	100.00%	100.00%	100.00%

=== 2000 census ===
As of the 2000 census, 3,047 people, 1,245 households, and 869 families resided in the county. The population density was 4/mi^{2} (1.5/km^{2}). The 2,007 housing units averaged 3/mi^{2} (1.2/km^{2}). The racial makeup of the county was 91.40% White, 0.20% Black or African American, 0.62% Native American, 0.20% Asian, 0.03% Pacific Islander, 6.01% from other races, and 1.54% from two or more races. Hispanics or Latinos of any race were about 22.58% of the population.

Of the 1,245 households, 26.50% had children under the age of 18 living with them, 58.40% were married couples living together, 7.60% had a female householder with no husband present, and 30.20% were not families. About 28.20% of all households were made up of individuals, and 14.80% had someone living alone who was 65 years of age or older. The average household size was 2.38 and the average family size was 2.88.

In the county, the population was distributed as 23.40% under the age of 18, 5.40% from 18 to 24, 21.50% from 25 to 44, 28.80% from 45 to 64, and 20.80% who were 65 years of age or older. The median age was 45 years. For every 100 females, there were 97.90 males. For every 100 females age 18 and over, there were 95.70 males.

The median income for a household in the county was $25,118, and for a family was $29,839. Males had a median income of $21,076 versus $18,352 for females. The per capita income for the county was $14,321. About 17.40% of families and 21.20% of the population were below the poverty line, including 30.60% of those under age 18 and 15.00% of those age 65 or over.

== Communities ==
=== Cities ===
- Camp Wood
- Leakey (county seat)

=== Unincorporated community ===
- Rio Frio

== Politics ==
United States presidential election results for Real County, Texas
Year	Republican		Democratic		Third party(ies)	
Year	No.	%	No.	%	No.	%
1916	14	4.93%	242	85.21%	28	9.86%
1920	111	35.92%	177	57.28%	21	6.80%
1924	300	60.24%	188	37.75%	10	2.01%
1928	479	83.02%	98	16.98%	0	0.00%
1932	89	20.99%	335	79.01%	0	0.00%
1936	55	20.75%	210	79.25%	0	0.00%
1940	126	21.76%	453	78.24%	0	0.00%
1944	163	29.69%	326	59.38%	60	10.93%
1948	156	25.32%	446	72.40%	14	2.27%
1952	450	59.76%	303	40.24%	0	0.00%
1956	350	64.70%	191	35.30%	0	0.00%
1960	377	57.73%	273	41.81%	3	0.46%
1964	255	34.32%	487	65.55%	1	0.13%
1968	290	41.25%	277	39.40%	136	19.35%
1972	483	75.23%	150	23.36%	9	1.40%
1976	448	46.23%	510	52.63%	11	1.14%
1980	832	57.26%	603	41.50%	18	1.24%
1984	1,004	73.34%	360	26.30%	5	0.37%
1988	795	61.58%	483	37.41%	13	1.01%
1992	787	47.99%	463	28.23%	390	23.78%
1996	845	58.40%	414	28.61%	188	12.99%
2000	1,146	76.91%	316	21.21%	28	1.88%
2004	1,314	79.88%	325	19.76%	6	0.36%
2008	1,238	76.04%	375	23.03%	15	0.92%
2012	1,236	80.52%	277	18.05%	22	1.43%
2016	1,382	82.21%	262	15.59%	37	2.20%
2020	1,643	82.90%	320	16.15%	19	0.96%
2024	1,625	82.99%	315	16.09%	18	0.92%

United States Senate election results for Real County, Texas1
Year	Republican		Democratic		Third party(ies)	
Year	No.	%	No.	%	No.	%
2024	1,574	80.76%	336	17.24%	39	2.00%

United States Senate election results for Real County, Texas2
Year	Republican		Democratic		Third party(ies)	
Year	No.	%	No.	%	No.	%
2020	1,626	83.86%	286	14.75%	27	1.39%

Texas Gubernatorial election results for Real County
Year	Republican		Democratic		Third party(ies)	
Year	No.	%	No.	%	No.	%
2022	1,337	85.21%	218	13.89%	14	0.89%

== Education ==
School districts include:

- Leakey Independent School District
- Nueces Canyon Consolidated Independent School District
- Utopia Independent School District
- Uvalde Consolidated Independent School District

The designated community college is Southwest Texas Junior College.

== See also ==
- List of museums in Central Texas
- National Register of Historic Places listings in Real County, Texas
- Recorded Texas Historic Landmarks in Real County
