= Cactus, Webb County, Texas =

Cactus
- Unincorporated community
- Interactive map of Cactus
- Location within Texas Cactus (the United States)
- Coordinates: 27°54′25″N 99°23′38″W
- Country: United States
- State: Texas
- County: Webb County

Cactus is an unincorporated area located along Interstate 35 in Webb County, Texas, United States.

== History ==
The community began in 1881 and was initially utilized as a shipping point along the International-Great Northern Railroad. A post office was erected in 1884, which was then discontinued in 1916. The community was reported to have 25 by the 1940s. Several amenities among the community such as a gas station and grocery combination, residences, and a cemetery remained by the 1980s.
