= Sabinal River =

River in Texas, USA

Sabinal River Arroyo de la Soledad

Physical characteristics
- Source: Sabinal Canyon
  - location: Uvalde County, Texas
  - coordinates: 29°51′45.23″N 99°35′25.61″W
- Mouth: On the Frio River
  - location: Uvalde County, Texas
  - coordinates: 29°6′12.87″N 99°26′35.16″W
- Length: 58 mi (93 km)

The Sabinal River, formerly Arroyo de la Soledad, is a stream in Uvalde and Bandera counties of the U.S. state of Texas. The upper part of the river runs through the Lost Maples State Natural Area, being fed by Hale, Hollow, and Can Creeks. The Mill, Little, Onion, Rancheros, Nolton, and East Elm Creeks feed in the lower region, where it runs underground in some places. The Sabinal exits into the Frio River about 16 miles south of the city of Sabinal.

== See also ==
- List of rivers of Texas
