= Camp Wood, Texas =

- City
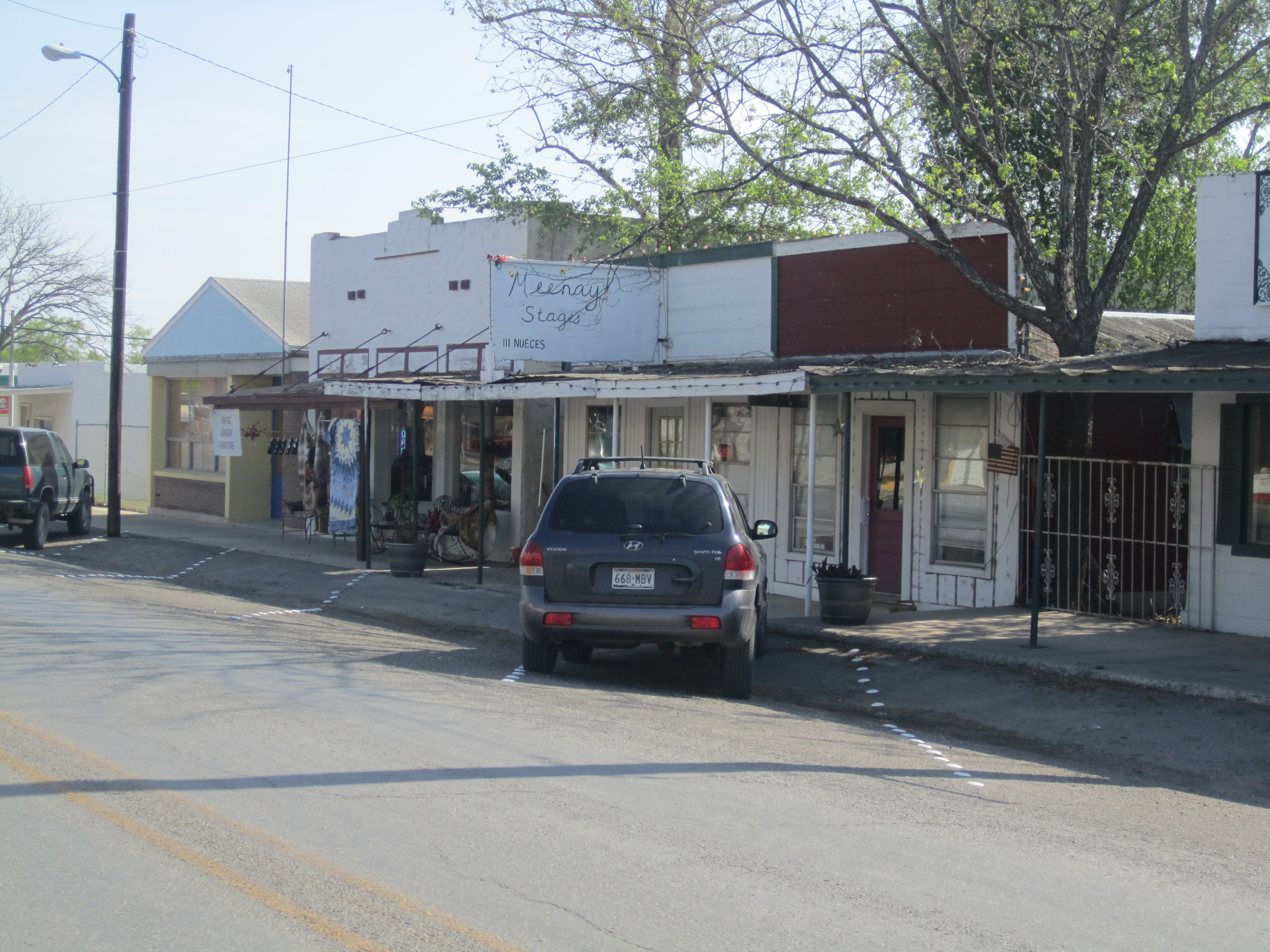
- A glimpse of along Nueces Street (Texas State Highway 55) in Camp Wood, March 2011

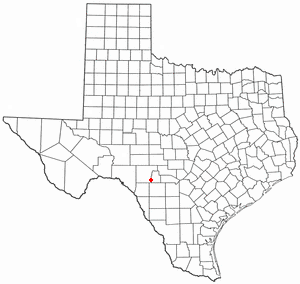
- Location of Camp Wood, Texas

- Coordinates: 29°40′09″N 100°00′39″W
- Country: United States
- State: Texas
- County: Real

Area
  - Total: 0.50 sq mi (1.30 km^{2})
  - Land: 0.50 sq mi (1.30 km^{2})
  - Water: 0 sq mi (0.00 km^{2})
- Elevation: 1,463 ft (446 m)

Population (2020)
  - Total: 517
  - Estimate (2019): 731
  - Density: 1,451.7/sq mi (560.52/km^{2})
- Time zone: UTC-6 (Central (CST))
  - Summer (DST): UTC-5 (CDT)
- ZIP code: 78833
- Area code: 830
- FIPS code: 48-12388
- GNIS feature ID: 2409970
- Website: cityofcampwood.com

Camp Wood is a city in Real County, Texas, United States, in the Texas Hill Country, which is part of the Edwards Plateau. The population was 517 at the 2020 census.

== History ==
The town was established in 1920.

== Geography ==
According to the United States Census Bureau, the city has a total area of 0.5 square miles (1.3 km^{2}), all land.

=== Climate ===
The climate in this area is characterized by hot, humid summers and generally mild to cool winters. Camp Wood has a humid subtropical climate, Cfa on climate maps according to the Köppen climate classification system.

== Demographics ==
=== 2020 census ===
As of the 2020 census, Camp Wood had a population of 517, along with 183 households and 179 families residing in the city.

The median age was 50.6 years. 20.9% of residents were under the age of 18 and 28.0% were 65 years of age or older. For every 100 females there were 107.6 males, and for every 100 females age 18 and over there were 103.5 males age 18 and over.

0% of residents lived in urban areas, while 100.0% lived in rural areas.

There were 183 households in Camp Wood, of which 31.7% had children under the age of 18 living in them. Of all households, 41.5% were married-couple households, 16.4% were households with a male householder and no spouse or partner present, and 36.6% were households with a female householder and no spouse or partner present. About 32.2% of all households were made up of individuals and 15.8% had someone living alone who was 65 years of age or older.

There were 215 housing units, of which 14.9% were vacant. Among occupied housing units, 81.4% were owner-occupied and 18.6% were renter-occupied. The homeowner vacancy rate was 1.9% and the rental vacancy rate was 15.0%.

Racial composition as of the 2020 census
Race	Percent
White	73.9%
Black or African American	0.8%
American Indian and Alaska Native	0.4%
Asian	0.4%
Native Hawaiian and Other Pacific Islander	0.2%
Some other race	7.2%
Two or more races	17.2%
Hispanic or Latino (of any race)	39.1%

=== 2000 census ===
Historical population
Census	Pop.	Note	%±
1940	778		—
1950	785		0.9%
1960	879		12.0%
1970	660		−24.9%
1980	728		10.3%
1990	595		−18.3%
2000	734		23.4%
2010	706		−3.8%
2020	517		−26.8%
2019 (est.)	731		3.5%
U.S. Decennial Census

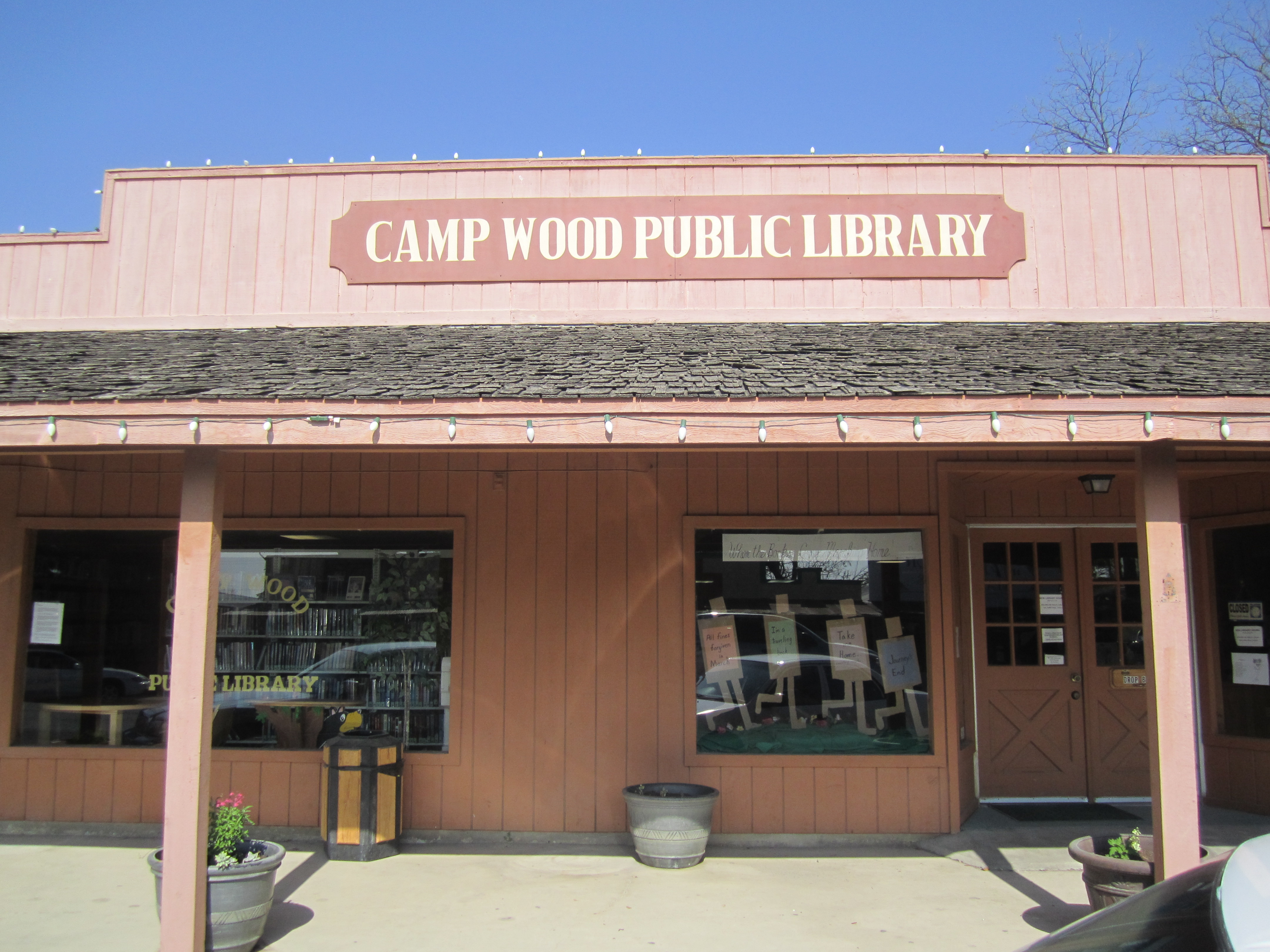
Camp Wood Public Library, March 2011

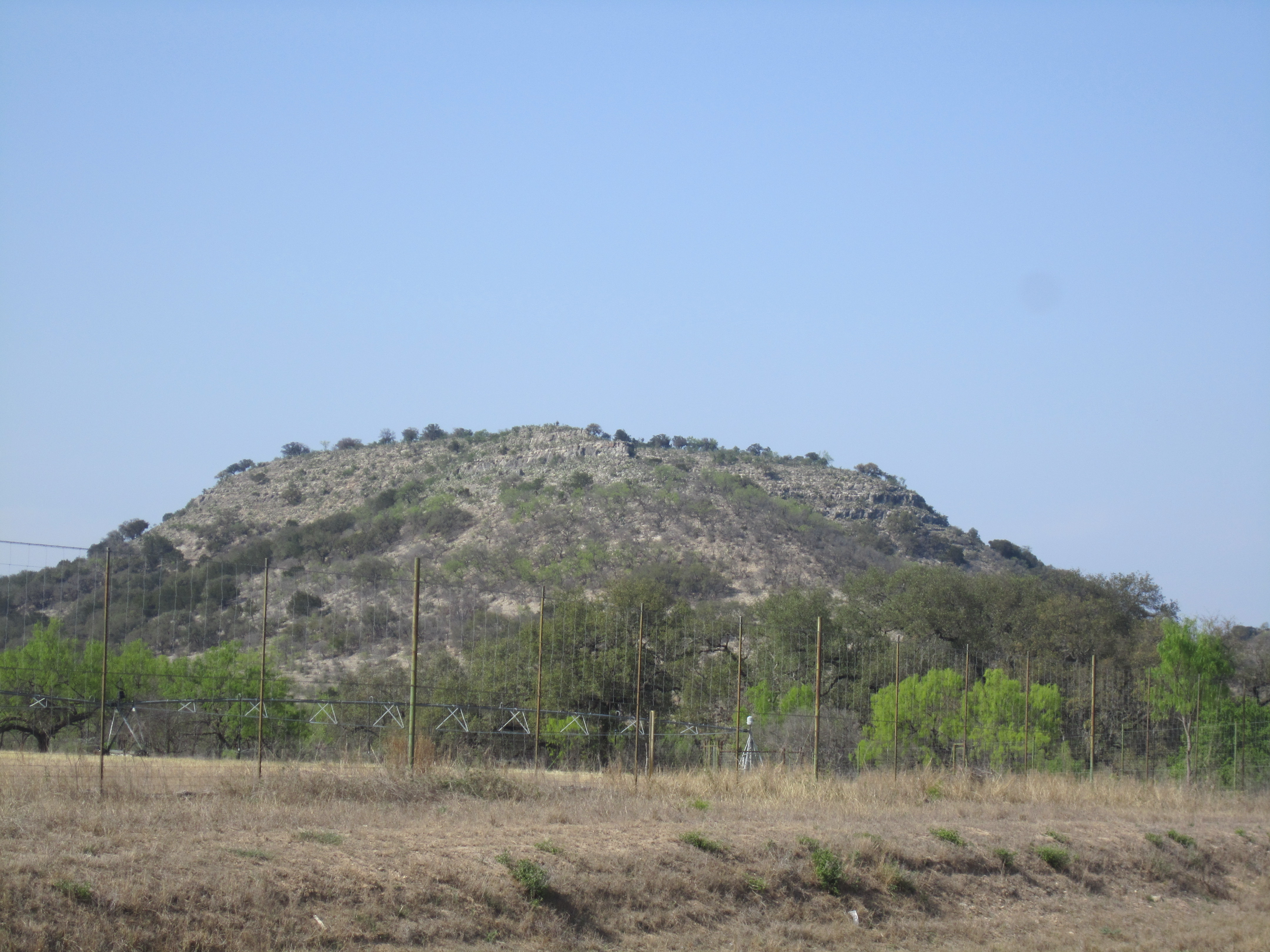
Scenic view from Texas State Highway 55 south of Camp Wood, March 2011

As of the census of 2000, 822 people, 281 households, and 198 families resided in the city. The population density averaged 1,629.8/mi^{2} (634.8/km^{2}). The 352 housing units averaged 697.9/mi^{2} (271.8/km^{2}). The racial makeup of the city was 90.27% White, 0.12% African American, 0.97% Native American, 0.36% Asian, 6.69% from other races, and 1.58% from two or more races. Hispanics or Latinos of any race were 39.66% of the population.

Of the 281 households, 34.5% had children under the age of 18 living with them, 51.6% were married couples living together, 13.5% had a female householder with no husband present, and 29.2% were not families. About 27.0% of all households were made up of individuals, and 13.5% had someone living alone who was 65 years of age or older. The average household size was 2.67 and the average family size was 3.19.

In the city, the population was distributed as 28.2% under the age of 18, 5.2% from 18 to 24, 22.7% from 25 to 44, 24.1% from 45 to 64, and 19.7% who were 65 years of age or older. The median age was 40 years. For every 100 females, there were 103.0 males. For every 100 females age 18 and over, there were 95.4 males.

The median income for a household in the city was $19,792, and for a family was $21,648. Males had a median income of $17,500 versus $13,182 for females. The per capita income for the city was $11,170. About 32.2% of families and 33.6% of the population were below the poverty line, including 40.0% of those under age 18 and 36.6% of those age 65 or over.

== Education ==
The City of Camp Wood is served by the Nueces Canyon Consolidated Independent School District.

== See also ==
- List of municipalities in Texas
