= Concan, Texas =

Unincorporated community in Uvalde County, Texas, United States

- unincorporated community
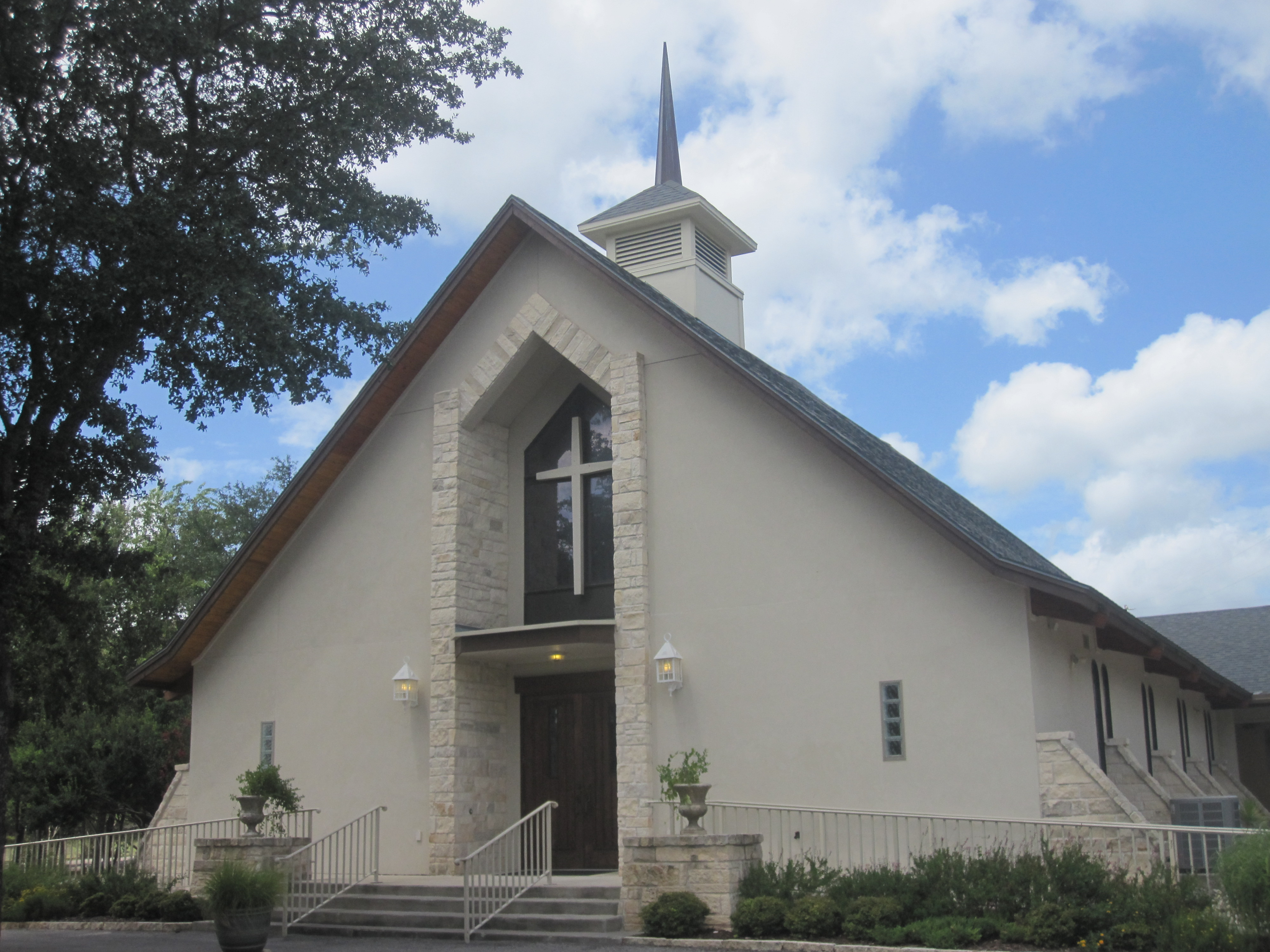
- Concan Baptist Temple, July 2010

- Location of Concan within the state of Texas
- Country: United States
- State: Texas
- County: Uvalde
- Elevation: 1,253 ft (382 m)
- ZIP code: 78838
- Area code: 830
- GNIS feature ID: 1333196

Concan is a small unincorporated community in Uvalde County, Texas, United States.

== Description ==
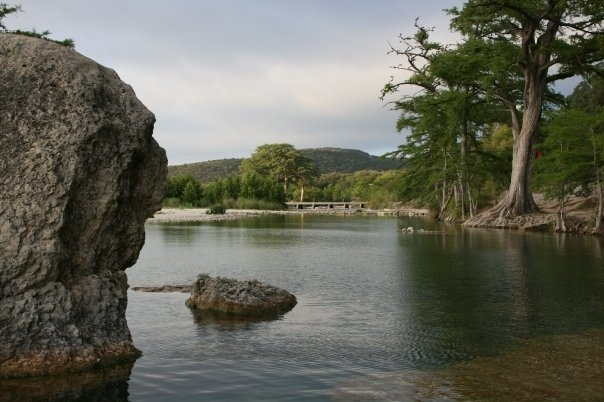
Frio River in Concan, June 2009

The community sits along the Frio River, close to Garner State Park and is a popular destination for summer vacationers. It is known for excellent birdwatching in the spring. A Roy Bechtol-designed 18-hole golf course called Concan Country Club or the Golf Club at Concan is open to the public. The area is dominated by large cattle, sheep, and goat ranches, some of which date back to when German immigrants settled this area.

Several outfitters in the area haul swimmers and tubers up the Frio River to designated drop-off points, then pick them up downstream.

The name "Concan" may have originated from the card game Conquian.
