= Leakey, Texas =

- City
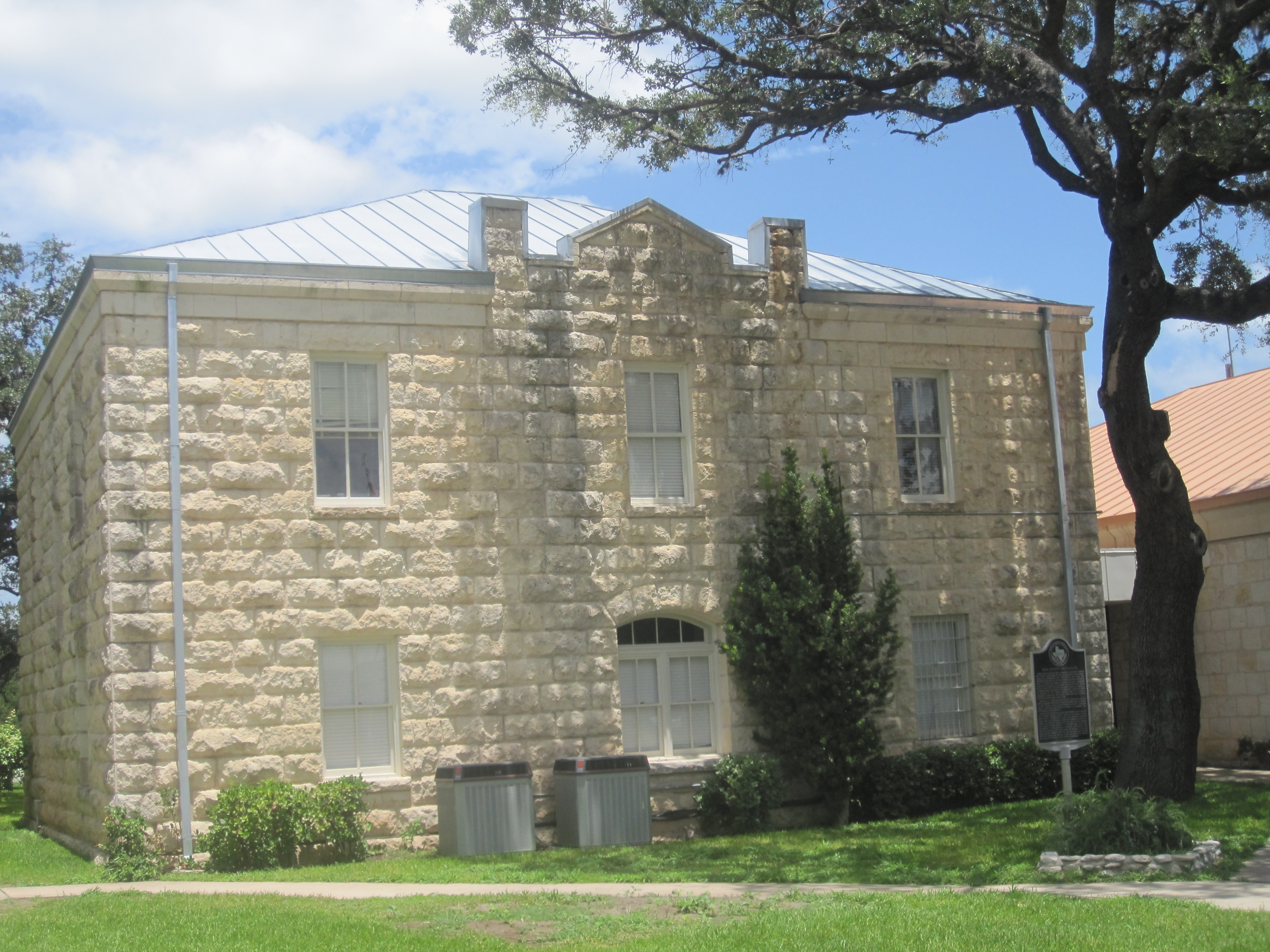
- Real County Courthouse in Leakey

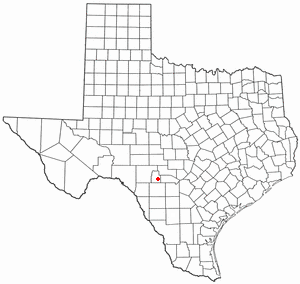
- Location of Leakey, Texas

- Coordinates: 29°43′31″N 99°45′41″W
- Country: United States
- State: Texas
- County: Real

Area
  - Total: 0.56 sq mi (1.45 km^{2})
  - Land: 0.56 sq mi (1.45 km^{2})
  - Water: 0 sq mi (0.00 km^{2})
- Elevation: 1,604 ft (489 m)

Population (2020)
  - Total: 315
  - Estimate (2019): 438
  - Density: 780.8/sq mi (301.46/km^{2})
- Time zone: UTC-6 (Central (CST))
  - Summer (DST): UTC-5 (CDT)
- ZIP code: 78873
- Area code: 830
- FIPS code: 48-42004
- GNIS feature ID: 2411643

Leakey (/ˈleɪki/ LAY-kee) is a city in and the county seat of Real County, Texas, United States. The population was 315 at the 2020 census. The city is named for John H. Leakey (1824–1900), a pioneer from Tennessee.

== History ==
Archaeological excavations in the Frio Canyon region revealed Paleo-American, Archaic, and Neo-American occupations. Later, several Native American tribes, including Lipan Apache, Comanche, and Tonkawa inhabited or traversed the area.

Anglo-American settlement of the area began in 1856 when John Leakey, his wife Nancy, and a few others settled near a spring along the banks of the Frio River. Shingles and lumber were produced from the abundant cypress and cedar trees. In its first few years, the community was a lonely outpost that was subject to frequent Indian raids, which continued until 1882. Growth accelerated after the Civil War as new families arrived. In 1883, A.G. Vogel moved a post office from the community of Floral to Leakey. That same year, the Texas State Legislature created Edwards County and designated Leakey as the county seat less than a year later. 1883 was also the year that the area's first school was established on land donated by the Leakeys. A new school building was completed in 1890. In 1891, the Edwards County seat was moved from Leakey to Rocksprings. During the early 1900s, ranching superseded lumber, cotton cultivation, and corn production in importance to the local economy. The raising of Angora goats was a major component of the ranching industry. In 1902, the school in Leakey had a total enrollment of 102 students. The town's population was estimated to be 318 in 1904.

Real County was created from parts of Edwards, Bandera, and Kerr Counties in the spring of 1913, with Leakey as the county seat. In 1919, Real County Judge Ed Kelly established the Leakey Independent School District. By the mid-1920s, the population had declined to around 120. A larger school building was completed in 1930. Soon after, several nearby schools, including West Frio, Cypress Creek, Rio Frio, Exile, Stanford, Dry Frio, and Harper were consolidated with Leakey schools.

Leakey was formally incorporated on June 11, 1951. The population fluctuated during the latter half of the 20th century. Leakey was home to 450 people in 1960, 393 in 1970, 468 in 1980, and 399 in 1990. By 2000, there were 387 residents living in Leakey, representing a 3.01% decrease in population since the last census was conducted in 1990.

On March 29, 2017, thirteen senior citizens from the First Baptist Church of New Braunfels in Comal County who had completed a retreat at Alto Frio were killed when Jack D. Young, the 20-year-old driver of a pickup, crashed into the church minivan on U.S. Highway 83 inside Uvalde County near the state park. One person survived the crash in critical condition. The accident was one of the deadliest in memory in the Leakey area. Young told a witness, "I'm sorry. I'm sorry" and said that he had been on his cell phone at the time of the accident. Jody Kuchler, a welder from Leakey who saw the accident, said that the driver of the church vehicle moved over to try to avoid Young's incoming pickup but was blocked by the guard rail.

Leaky and the surrounding region received attention in June 2026 after Gracie, a reticulated giraffe, escaped from a Leaky-based exotic animal breeder. While Gracie was spotted on various cameras, she was always gone by the time others investigated. Social media in the region took interest in speculating on Gracie's location, tracking real images of her, and creating imaginary images of her visiting locations and socializing with residents. After around two weeks spent in the wild, Gracie was recovered on June 26 after being spotted by helicopter.

== Geography ==
Leakey is situated at the intersection of U.S. Highway 83, RM 336, RM 337, and FM 1120 in southeastern Real County, approximately 35 miles north of Uvalde and 90 miles northwest of San Antonio.

According to the United States Census Bureau, the city has a total area of 0.6 square miles (1.6 km^{2}), all land.

The community is in proximity to the Garner State Park, located north of Uvalde.

=== Climate ===
The climate in this area is characterized by hot, humid summers and generally mild to cool winters. Leakey has a humid subtropical climate, Cfa on climate maps according to the Köppen climate classification system.

== Demographics ==
Historical population
Census	Pop.	Note	%±
1960	587		—
1970	393		−33.0%
1980	468		19.1%
1990	399		−14.7%
2000	387		−3.0%
2010	425		9.8%
2020	315		−25.9%
U.S. Decennial Census

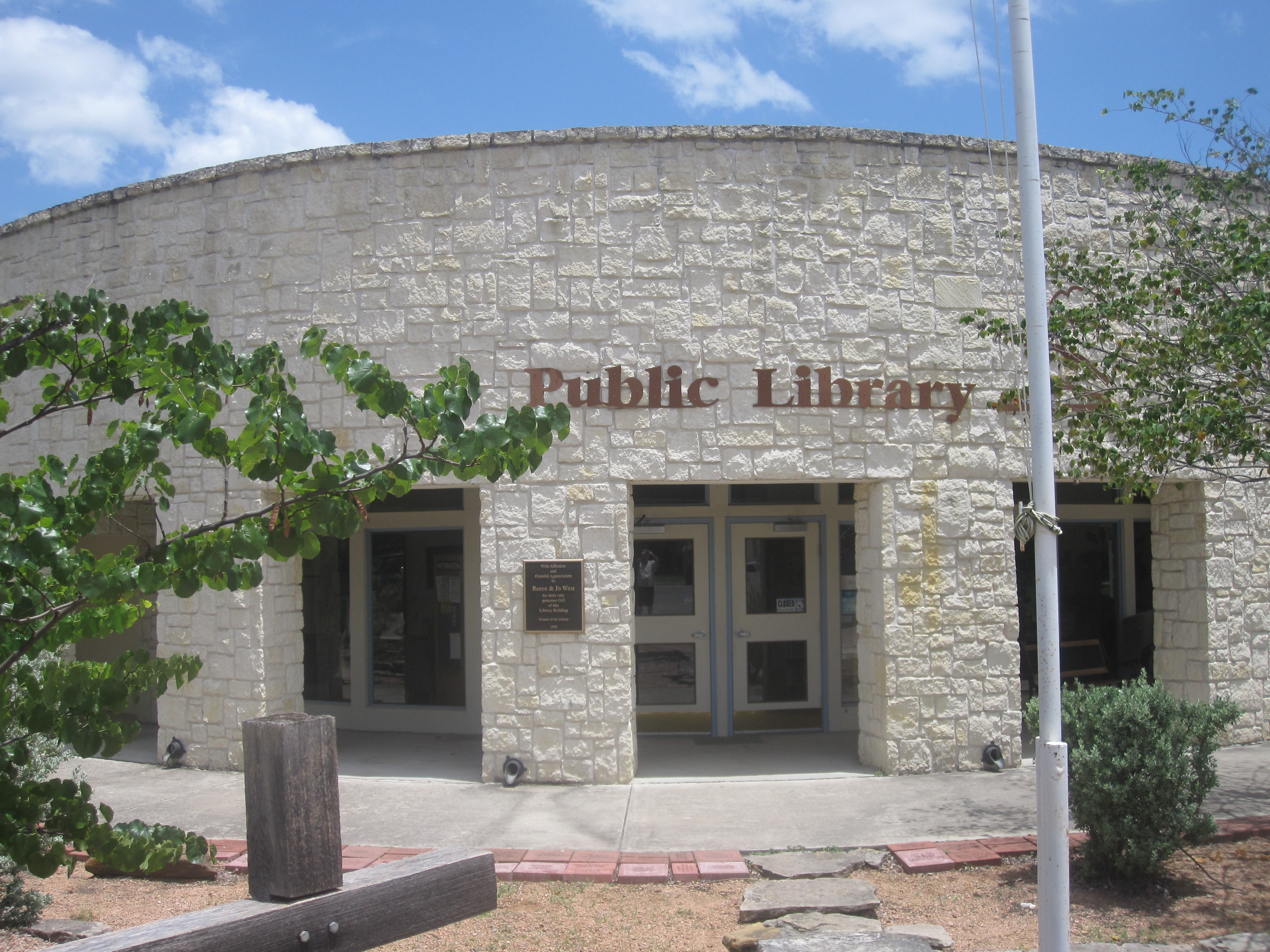
Leakey Public Library

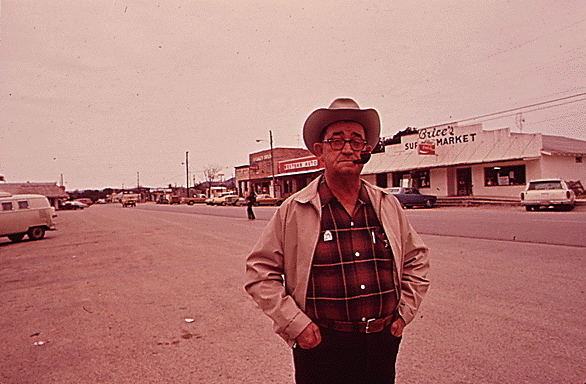
Main Street in Leakey (1972), Photograph by Marc St. Gil

=== 2020 census ===
As of the 2020 census, Leakey had a population of 315 and a median age of 48.5 years. 22.5% of residents were under the age of 18 and 26.7% of residents were 65 years of age or older. For every 100 females there were 107.2 males, and for every 100 females age 18 and over there were 101.7 males.

There were 129 households in Leakey, of which 24.0% had children under the age of 18 living in them. Of all households, 39.5% were married-couple households, 27.1% were households with a male householder and no spouse or partner present, and 27.1% were households with a female householder and no spouse or partner present. About 30.3% of all households were made up of individuals and 11.7% had someone living alone who was 65 years of age or older.

There were 176 housing units, of which 26.7% were vacant. The homeowner vacancy rate was 4.2% and the rental vacancy rate was 21.6%.

0.0% of residents lived in urban areas, while 100.0% lived in rural areas.

Racial composition as of the 2020 census
Race	Number	Percent
White	242	76.8%
Black or African American	6	1.9%
American Indian and Alaska Native	4	1.3%
Asian	3	1.0%
Native Hawaiian and Other Pacific Islander	0	0.0%
Some other race	16	5.1%
Two or more races	44	14.0%
Hispanic or Latino (of any race)	96	30.5%

=== 2010 census ===
As of the 2010 census, 425 people, 174 households, and 115 families resided in the city. The population density was 708.3 inhabitants per square mile (273.5/km^{2}). The 237 housing units averaged 395/mi^{2} (148.1/km^{2}). The racial makeup of the city was 91.5% White, 0.5% African American, 2.1% Native American, 3.8% from other races. Hispanics or Latinos of any race were 26.4% of the population.

Of the 174 households, 28.1% had children under the age of 18 living with them, 54% were married couples living together, 8.6% had a female householder with no husband present, and 33.9% were not families. About 30.5% of all households were made up of individuals, and 10.3% had someone living alone who was 65 years of age or older. The average household size was 2.44 and the average family size was 2.97.

In the city, the population was distributed as 27.2% under the age of 20, 4.7% from 20 to 24, 23.6% from 25 to 44, 26.6% from 45 to 64, and 17.9% who were 65 years of age or older. The median age was 41.1 years. For every 100 females, there were 84.3 males. For every 100 females age 18 and over, there were 83.4 males.

The median income for a household in the city was $23,125, and for a family was $24,531.

== Economy ==
As of the 1970s, much of Leakey's income derived from deer hunters traveling there in the fall and from tourists in the summer.

== Education ==
Public education in the city of Leakey is provided by the Leakey Independent School District.

Children also have the option of attending Ed Brune Charter School.
