= Sabinal, Texas =

- City
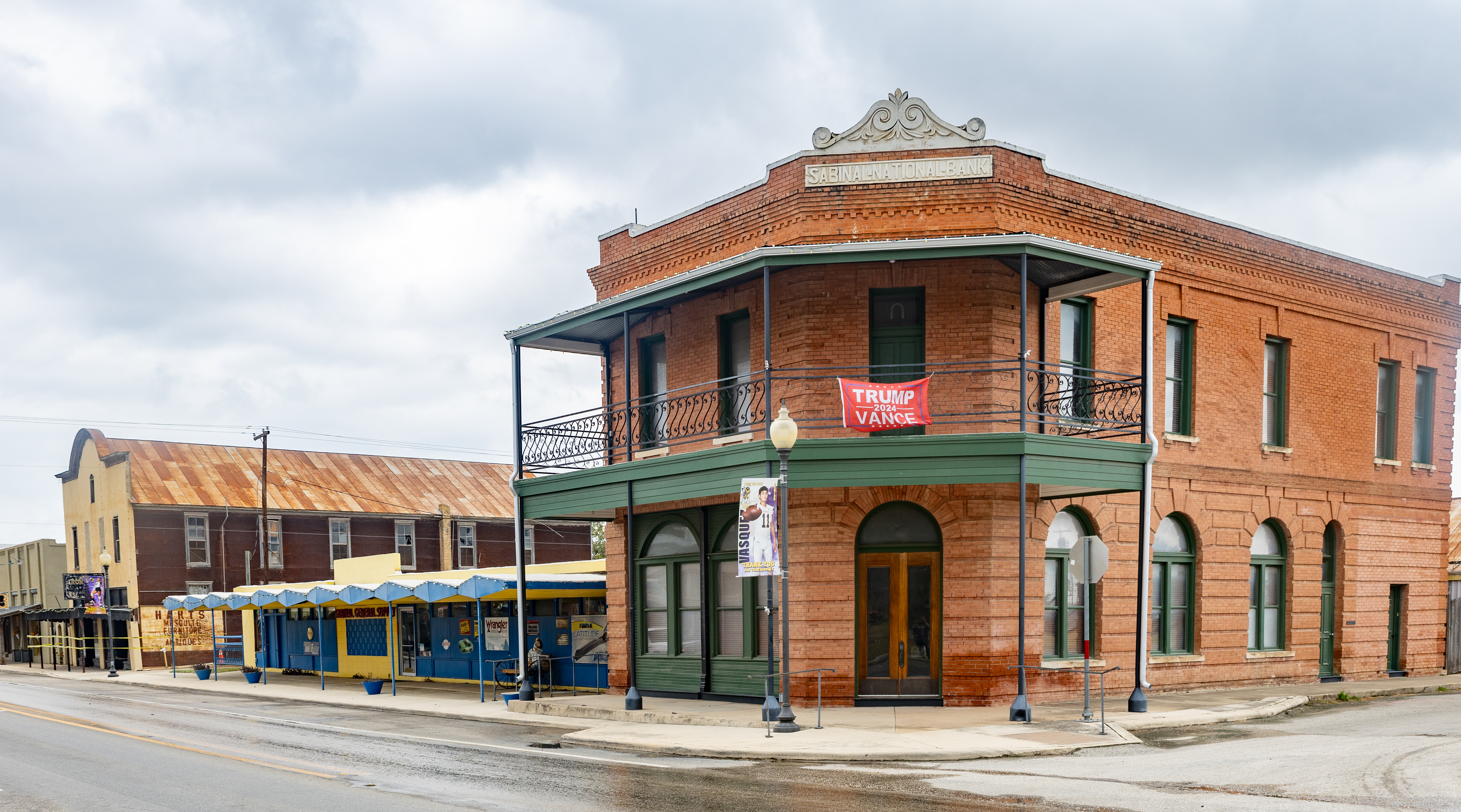
- Downtown Sabinal

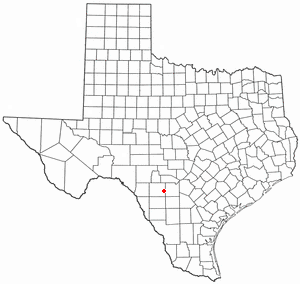
- Location of Sabinal, Texas

- Mayor: Charles D. Story
- Coordinates: 29°19′17″N 99°28′10″W
- Country: United States
- State: Texas
- County: Uvalde

Area
  - Total: 1.19 sq mi (3.08 km^{2})
  - Land: 1.19 sq mi (3.08 km^{2})
  - Water: 0 sq mi (0.00 km^{2})
- Elevation: 955 ft (291 m)

Population (2020)
  - Total: 1,364
  - Density: 1,150/sq mi (443/km^{2})
- Time zone: UTC-6 (Central (CST))
  - Summer (DST): UTC-5 (CDT)
- ZIP code: 78881
- Area code: 830
- FIPS code: 48-64004
- GNIS feature ID: 2411018
- Website: https://www.cityofsabinal.org

Sabinal is a city in Uvalde County, Texas, United States. The population was 1,364 at the 2020 census, down from 1,695 in 2010. It is part of the Uvalde, Texas Micropolitan Statistical Area.

== Geography ==
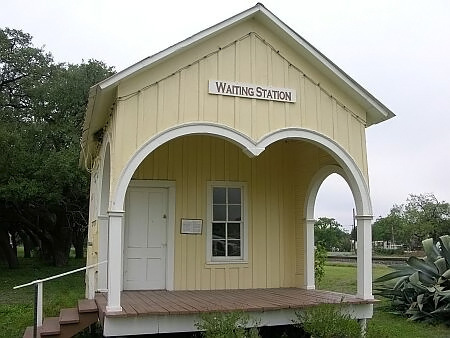
The "Waiting Station", a historic building in Sabinal

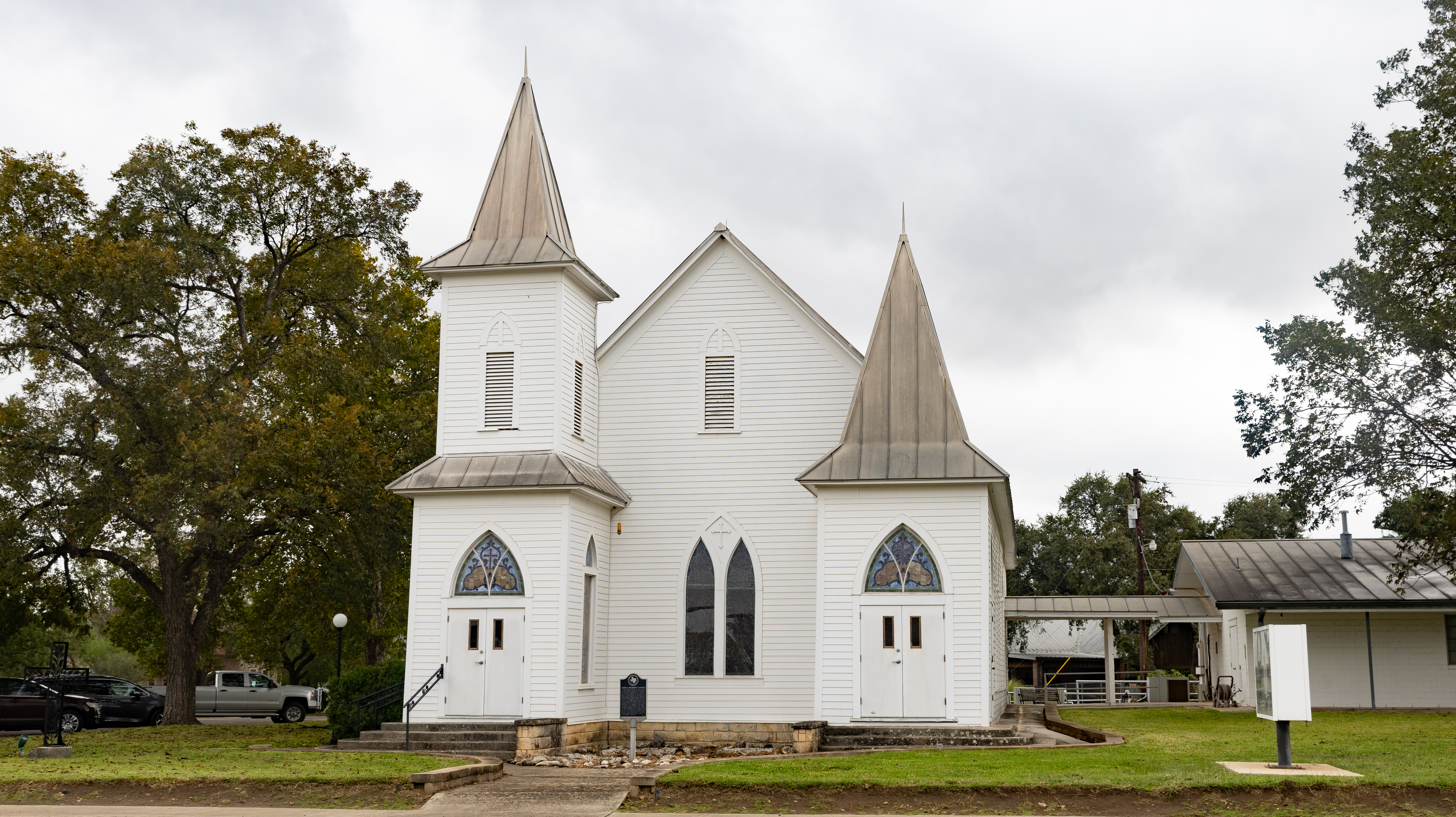
Sabinal Methodist Church

According to the United States Census Bureau, the city has a total area of 1.2 square miles (3.1 km^{2}), all land.

=== Transportation ===
U.S. Route 90 runs east-west through the center of Sabinal as Fisher Avenue, leading east 20 miles (32 km) to Hondo and west 22 miles (35 km) to Uvalde. Texas State Highway 127 runs northeast, initially following Center Street, 21 miles (34 km) to intersect U.S. Route 83 in Concan. The closest airport with commercial airline service is San Antonio International Airport, on the north side of San Antonio 66 miles (106 km) to the east.

=== Climate ===
The climate in this area is characterized by hot, humid summers and generally mild to cool winters. According to the Köppen Climate Classification system, Sabinal has a humid subtropical climate, abbreviated "Cfa" on climate maps.

== Demographics ==
Historical population
Census	Pop.	Note	%±
1910	1,640		—
1920	1,458		−11.1%
1930	1,586		8.8%
1940	1,768		11.5%
1950	1,974		11.7%
1960	1,747		−11.5%
1970	1,554		−11.0%
1980	1,827		17.6%
1990	1,584		−13.3%
2000	1,586		0.1%
2010	1,695		6.9%
2020	1,364		−19.5%
U.S. Decennial Census; Texas Almanac: 1850–2000; 1850–1900 1910; 1920 1930 1940; 1950 1960 1970; 1980 1990 2000; 2010 2020

=== Racial and ethnic composition ===
Sabinal city, Texas – Racial and ethnic composition Note: the US Census treats Hispanic/Latino as an ethnic category. This table excludes Latinos from the racial categories and assigns them to a separate category. Hispanics/Latinos may be of any race.
Race / Ethnicity (NH = Non-Hispanic)	Pop 2000	Pop 2010	Pop 2020	% 2000	% 2010	% 2020
White alone (NH)	561	535	364	35.37%	31.56%	26.69%
Black or African American alone (NH)	1	6	3	0.06%	0.35%	0.22%
Native American or Alaska Native alone (NH)	0	2	1	0.00%	0.12%	0.07%
Asian alone (NH)	1	1	0	0.06%	0.06%	0.00%
Native Hawaiian or Pacific Islander alone (NH)	0	0	1	0.00%	0.00%	0.07%
Other race alone (NH)	0	10	0	0.00%	0.59%	0.00%
Mixed race or Multiracial (NH)	7	13	18	0.44%	0.77%	1.32%
Hispanic or Latino (any race)	1,016	1,128	977	64.06%	66.55%	71.63%
Total	1,586	1,695	1,364	100.00%	100.00%	100.00%

=== 2020 census ===
As of the 2020 census, Sabinal had a population of 1,364, 512 households, and 234 families. There were 606 housing units, of which 15.5% were vacant; the homeowner vacancy rate was 0.8% and the rental vacancy rate was 11.2%.

The median age was 39.1 years. 23.8% of residents were under the age of 18 and 20.1% of residents were 65 years of age or older.

For every 100 females there were 98.0 males, and for every 100 females age 18 and over there were 95.7 males age 18 and over.

Of the 512 households, 38.3% had children under the age of 18 living in them. Of all households, 45.9% were married-couple households, 19.3% were households with a male householder and no spouse or partner present, and 30.7% were households with a female householder and no spouse or partner present. About 23.1% of all households were made up of individuals and 11.5% had someone living alone who was 65 years of age or older.

0.0% of residents lived in urban areas, while 100.0% lived in rural areas.

Racial composition as of the 2020 census
Race	Number	Percent
White	706	51.8%
Black or African American	3	0.2%
American Indian and Alaska Native	6	0.4%
Asian	0	0.0%
Native Hawaiian and Other Pacific Islander	1	0.1%
Some other race	278	20.4%
Two or more races	370	27.1%
Hispanic or Latino (of any race)	977	71.6%

=== 2000 Census ===
As of the census of 2000, there were 1,586 people, 560 households, and 417 families residing in the city. The population density was 1,336.3 inhabitants per square mile (515.9/km^{2}). There were 655 housing units at an average density of 551.9 per square mile (213.1/km^{2}). The racial makeup of the city was 79.51% White, 0.06% African American, 0.19% Native American, 0.06% Asian, 0.06% Pacific Islander, 16.46% from other races, and 3.66% from two or more races. Hispanic or Latino of any race were 64.06% of the population.

There were 560 households, out of which 38.6% had children under the age of 18 living with them, 58.2% were married couples living together, 12.7% had a female householder with no husband present, and 25.5% were non-families. 23.6% of all households were made up of individuals, and 12.9% had someone living alone who was 65 years of age or older. The average household size was 2.83 and the average family size was 3.39.

In the city, the population was spread out, with 30.1% under the age of 18, 7.9% from 18 to 24, 25.9% from 25 to 44, 20.9% from 45 to 64, and 15.3% who were 65 years of age or older. The median age was 35 years. For every 100 females, there were 94.8 males. For every 100 females age 18 and over, there were 90.2 males.

The median income for a household in the city was $26,429, and the median income for a family was $31,776. Males had a median income of $25,169 versus $16,250 for females. The per capita income for the city was $12,393. About 17.2% of families and 21.6% of the population were below the poverty line, including 26.9% of those under age 18 and 19.8% of those age 65 or over.

== Education ==
The city is served by the Sabinal Independent School District.

== Notable people ==
- Mariette Rheiner Garner, second lady of the United States from 1933 to 1941
- Johnny Rodriguez, country singer
