= Garner State Park =

State park in Texas, United States

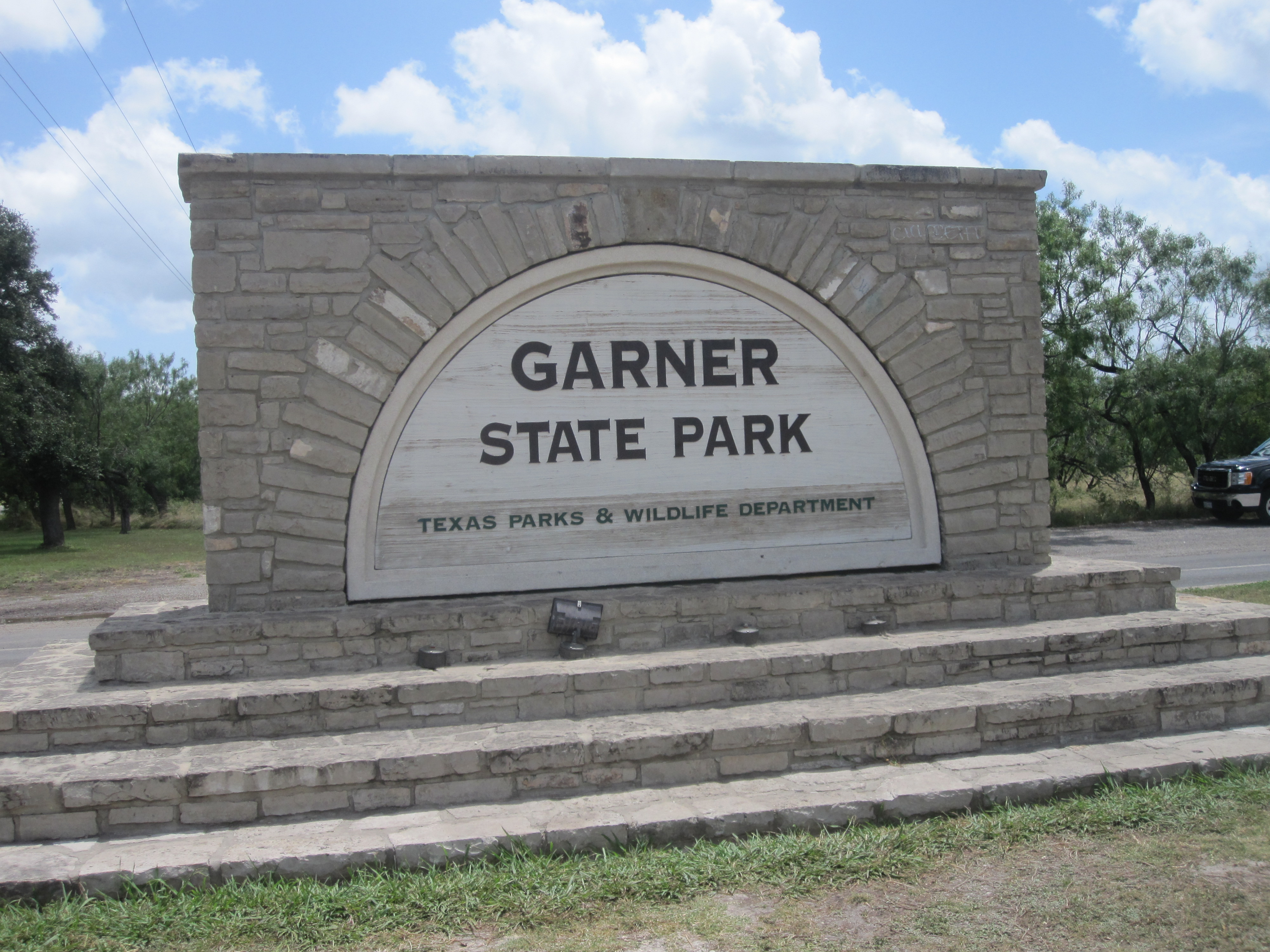
- Location: Uvalde County, Texas
- Nearest city: Concan
- Coordinates: 29°35′00″N 99°44′20″W
- Area: 1,774 acres (7.18 km^{2})
- Established: 1941
- Visitors: 455,606 (in 2025)
- Governing body: Texas Parks and Wildlife Department
- Website: Official website

Garner State Park is a 1,774-acre (718 ha) state park on the Frio River near the community of Concan, in Uvalde County, Texas, United States. The park opened in 1941 and is managed by the Texas Parks and Wildlife Department.

== History ==
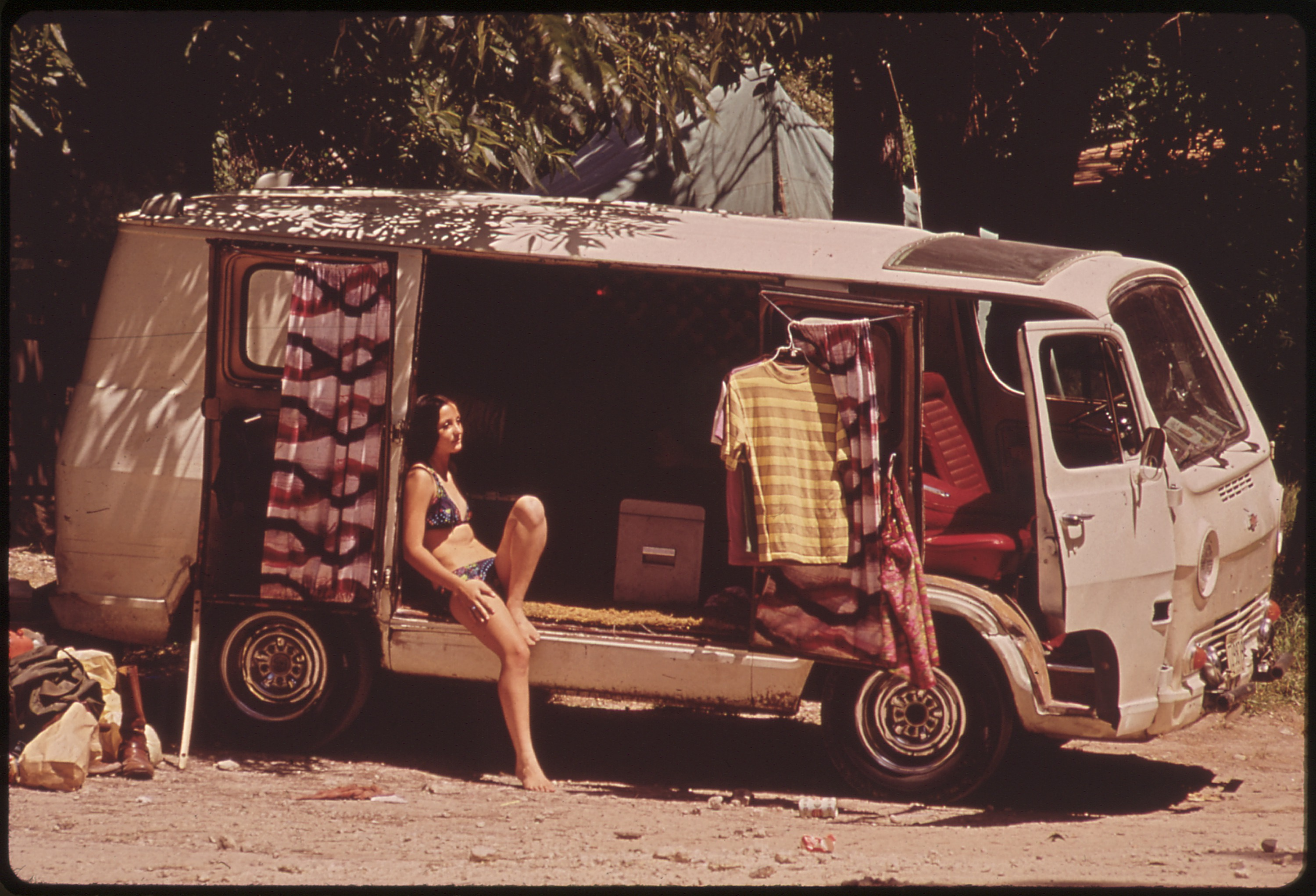
Campers, 1972

In the early 1930s the park was built to save a portion of the hill country for the public, and to provide work for unemployed men during the economic depression. The land for Garner State Park was acquired in 1934 through 1936. In 1934, the Texas State Parks Board approved the location for a future state park, and the Texas Legislature provided funding for state parks. The Civilian Conservation Corps built the park’s original improvements, which included a large pavilion and a concessions building. The property was conveyed to the State Parks Board in 1936, and it opened as Garner State Park in 1941. The park was named for John Nance Garner, former Vice-President of the United States who lived and practiced law in the Concan area. The park's size more than doubled when 790 acres (320 ha) were added in 1976.

Another park named Garner State Park, later known as Stephenville State Park, began construction in 1932 in Erath County, Texas, though the name was soon transferred to the Uvalde location. The city of Stephenville, which operated the park, returned the land to the state in the 1940s. The property was returned to the local Collier family in 1953 and, after being sold in 1982, is now known as Garner Park Ranch.

== Geology ==
The area came about in the Cretaceous age when the Edwards Plateau was formed when a section of land was lifted 2000 feet along a curving fault. It is now located on the southwestern edge of the plateau in the sub-region Balcones Canyonlands. Today high mesas, limestone cliffs, deep canyons and clear streams fill the terrain.

=== Mount Old Baldy ===
Garner State Park is home to Mount Old Baldy, which overlooks the Frio River. At its peak, the hill sits at 1,849 feet above sea level.

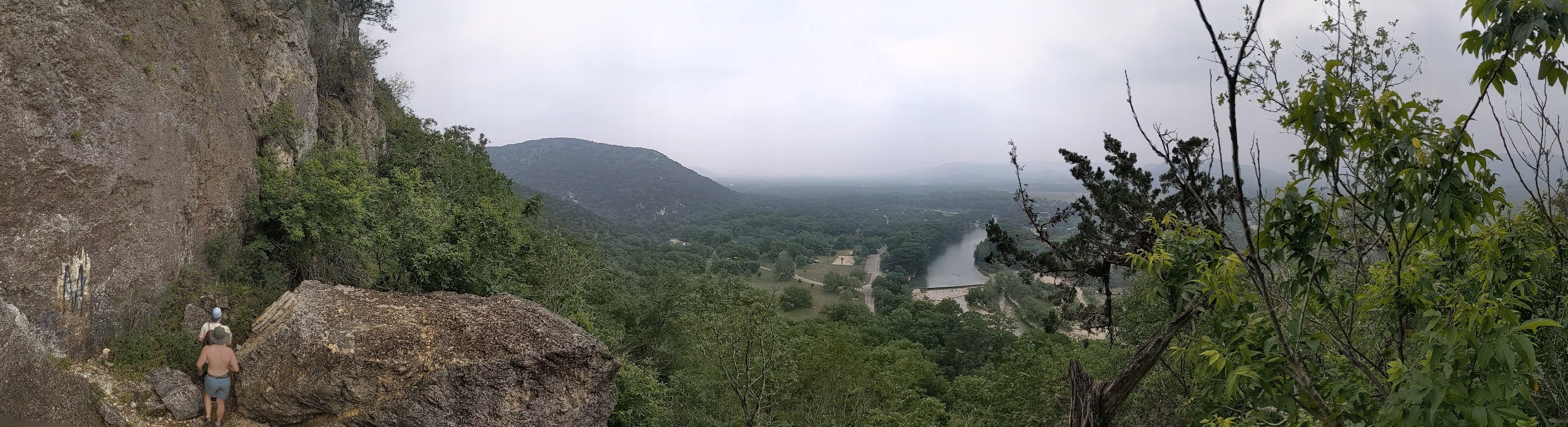
Panoramic outlook from the north side of Mount Ol' Baldy, overlooking the Frio River.

== Nature ==
=== Plants ===
The area has rich vegetation due to the canyons angles from southeast to southwest as well as prevailing winds which cool and moisten the area. Pecan and American sycamore are found along the river. Ashe juniper, Texas live oak, escarpment black cherry, Texas mountain laurel and Texas persimmon abound on the hillsides.

==== Bald cypress ====
Bald cypress trees line the Frio River, can grow to 120 feet, and live up to 600 years. Their name is derived from the length of time that they are leafless, since they shed leaves in the fall and don’t bloom until late spring. The bald cypress help the Frio River by slowing floodwaters, trapping sediment and pollutants. They also provide nesting sites, food and shelter for wildlife.

==== Texas madrone ====
The Texas madrone is a rare slow-growing, drought-tolerant tree that grows to about 20 to 30 feet. The trunk has red inner bark and peels in thin sheets of orange and brown. White bell-shaped flowers bloom in spring and produce red and orange berries. It is found on the rocky, shaded slopes of the hills in Garner State Park.

=== Animals ===
There is much wildlife in the park such as white-tailed deer, eastern fox squirrel, raccoon, wild turkey, striped skunk and other animals.

==== Golden-cheeked warbler ====
The golden-cheeked warbler are birds that nest only in the mixed Ashe juniper and oak woodlands of Central Texas from March to July. They feed on insects and spiders from trees and use spider webs in building their nests. They are endangered due to loss of nesting habitat.

==== Black-capped vireo ====
The black-capped vireo are small birds that nest in Texas in the spring but from April to July. They make their nests in low shrubs.

== Housing and facilities ==
=== Campsites ===
Visitors require a reservation made in advance due to the popularity of the park. Visitors may choose between a tent/RV site, a screened shelter or a cabin. Some cabins have fireplaces, all have kitchen facilities and indoor plumbing. If a campsite or screened shelter is chosen, there are public restrooms and showers available to all park guests.

=== Garner Grill ===
During the day, the Garner Grill adjacent to the big pavilion is open. There is even a new souvenir cup style every season that can be collected. The Grill is open daily during the summer but is closed during the off-season, typically October through February.

=== Gift shop ===
At the gift shop one can purchase souvenirs like jewelry, boots, toys and other items. Customized apparel featuring the park's name is available. There is also an online gift shop, updated regularly, providing merchandise as well.

== Recreation ==
Activities at the park include hiking, nature study, picnicking, canoeing, fishing, paddle boat and kayak rentals (spring and summer), bicycling and miniature golf.

=== Day Use Visitors ===
Garner State Park is the most sought after park in the Texas State Parks system. Due to high demand, a Day Use reservation is highly recommended during the off-season months of October to February. During the high demand on-season months of March to September, Day Use reservations are required before visiting the park to guarantee entry.

=== Ranger programs ===
To learn more about the park, there are ranger instructional programs. In these programs, park rangers teach students about the nature, history, and traditions of the park and let campers participate in geology programs and can be led on nature hikes.

=== Volunteer opportunities ===
Volunteers can help by keeping the park clean by maintaining trails, renewing habitats, becoming a park host or leading educational programs.

== See also ==
- List of Texas state parks

== Gallery ==
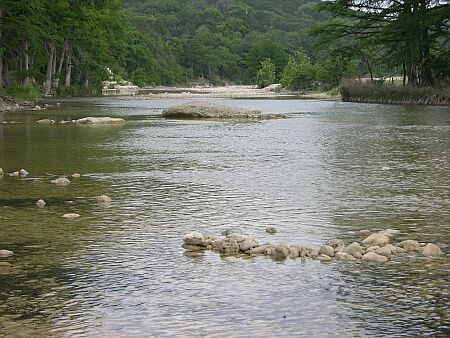
The Frio River flowing through the Garner State Park

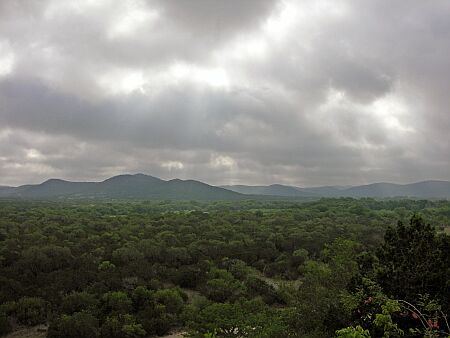
The view of the Texas Hill Country from Garner State Park

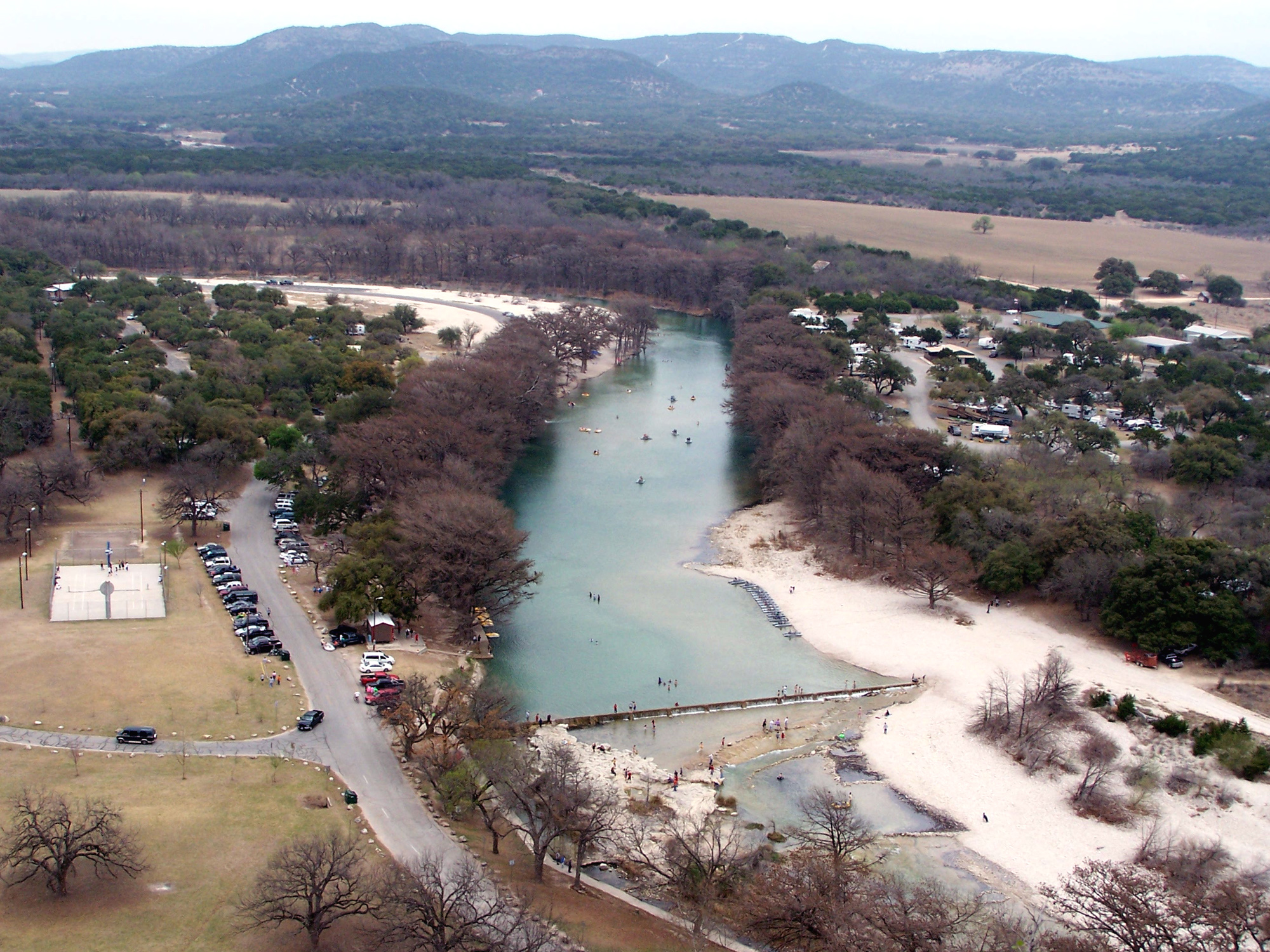
The Frio River winds southward on east edge of Garner State Park (on the left)

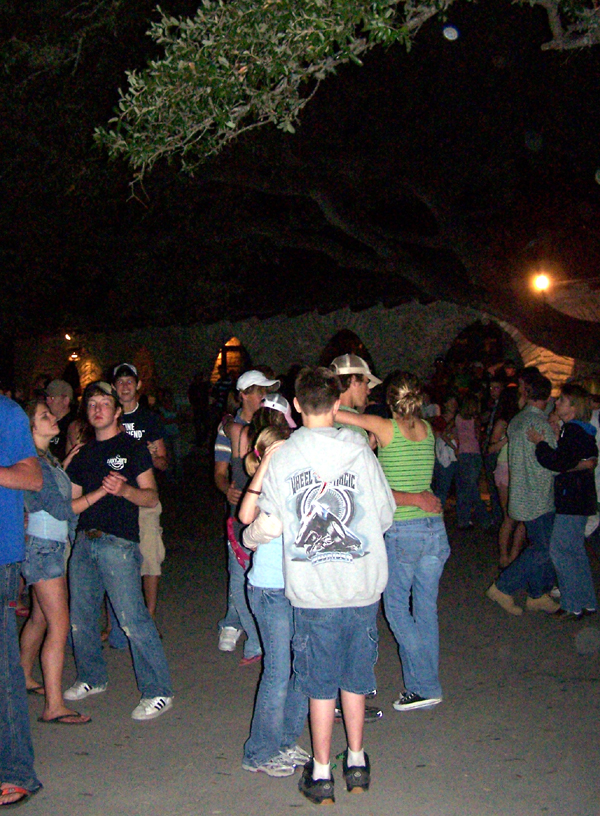
Dancing under the stars at the park's pavilion

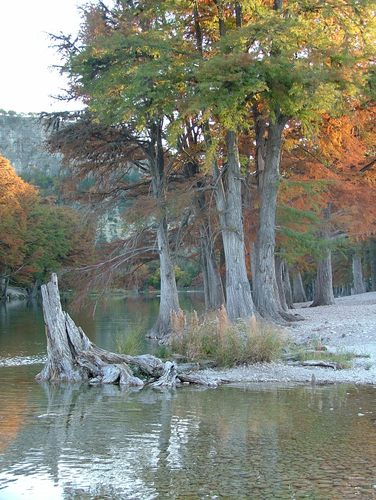
Bald cypress trees along the Frio River in Garner State Park
