= Frio River =

River in Texas, United States

Frio River Tributary to Nueces River
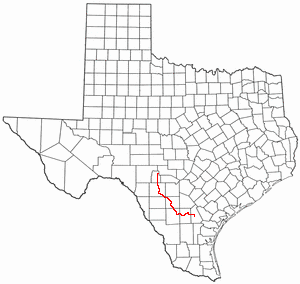
- Location of the Frio River, Texas

- Location of Frio River mouth Frio River (the United States)

Location
- Country: United States
- State: Texas
- Counties: Live Oak; McMullen; La Salle; Frio; Medina; Uvalde; Real
- City: Tilden

Physical characteristics
- Source: confluence of West Frio River and East Frio River
  - location: about 1 mile northeast of Leakey, Texas
  - coordinates: 29°44′23.86″N 099°45′1.21″W
  - elevation: 1,590 ft (480 m)
- Mouth: Nueces River
  - location: about 1 mile south of Three Rivers, Texas
  - coordinates: 29°26′14.98″N 099°11′19.03″W
  - elevation: 121 ft (37 m)
- Length: 234.36 mi (377.17 km)
- Basin size: 6,912.86 square miles (17,904.2 km^{2})
- Discharge
  - location: Nueces River
  - average: 372.78 cu ft/s (10.556 m^{3}/s) at mouth with Nueces River

Basin features
- Progression: Nueces River → Nueces Bay → Corpus Christi Bay → Gulf of Mexico
- River system: Nueces River
- Tributaries
  - left: East Frio River, Little Dry Frio Creek, Cherry Creek, Bear Creek, Brushy Creek, Spring Branch, Blanco Creek, Sabinal River, Hondo Creek, Buck Creek, Lockhardt Creek, Ruiz Creek, Cayman Slough, Esperanza Creek, Rockaway Creek, Salt Branch, Cottonwood Creek, San Miquel Creek, Elm Creek, Opossum Creek, Atascosa River, Hackberry Creek
  - right: West Frio River, Flat Creek, Pecan Creek, Sycamore Creek, Dry Frio River, Salt Creek, Elm Creek, Big Slough, Live Oak Creek, Leona River, Martin Branch, Cibolo Creek, Galinda Creek, Big Slough, Salt Creek
- Waterbodies: Choke Canyon Reservoir
- Bridges: Camino Bajo, TX 337, Flat Rock Cir, Ranch Road 1120, River Place Road, Ranch Road 1120, Texas Hill Country Trail, Country Road 350, Country Road 348, Comanche Creek Road, County Road 348, TX 127, unnamed road, County Road 2690, County Road 101, US 90, Garner Field Road, Ranch Road 187, unnamed road, US 57, W FM 140, County Road 1581, County Road 4425, I-35, TX 85, unnamed road (x3), Natus Road, TX 97, Findley Road, TX 16, FM 99, TX 72

The Frio River is a river in the U.S. state of Texas. The word frío is Spanish for cold, a clear reference to the spring-fed coolness of the river.

== Variant names ==
According to the Geographic Names Information System, it has also been known historically as:

- Rio Frio
- Arroyo Hondo
- Rio Hondo
- Rio Sarco

== Geography ==
The Frio River has three primary tributaries; the East, West, and Dry Frio Rivers. The West Frio River rises from springs in northeastern Real County and joins with the East Frio River near the town of Leakey; the Dry Frio River joins northeast of Uvalde. The river flows generally southeast for 200 miles until it empties into the Nueces River south of the town of Three Rivers. Along the way, the Frio River provides water to the Choke Canyon Reservoir in McMullen and Live Oak Counties.

== Recreation ==
The cool and consistent flow of the Frio River has made it a popular summertime destination. Garner State Park, on the river about 10 miles (16 km) south of Leakey and 75 miles (121 km) west of San Antonio, provides camping, fishing and other activities. Numerous other privately owned campgrounds are also found along the river.

== Miscellaneous ==
- Frio County, Texas is named for the river.
- Frio River is popularly considered navigable from well above Leakey to about 5 mi (8.0 km) downstream of Concan. From that latter place, the Frio River's water volume in summer months is insufficient to surmount the natural percolation down into limestone subsurface water courses; therefore, the river bed appears dry intermittently, and the river is no longer efficiently navigable continuously year-round from that place to its confluence with the Nueces River. Applicable laws concerning navigability include statutes written in Spanish that are still in force in Texas. The river may only be accessed from public access points, and all river banks are private property. Accessing the riverbanks is only legal in the event of portaging canoes or scouting for obstructions. As stated by the Texas Parks and Wildlife Department, which manages navigable rivers in Texas: "Senate Bill (S.B.) 155 strikes a balance between the navigation right and private property interests by providing that portaging or scouting obstructions do not create a prescriptive easement over any private property so used. Thus, under S.B. 155, if private riverside property is used to portage or scout obstructions, the landowner does not bear any risk of permanent loss of a property interest. Should it become unnecessary to use that particular riverside property to portage or scout obstructions (for example, because the river changes course), the public right of use disappears."

== Gallery ==
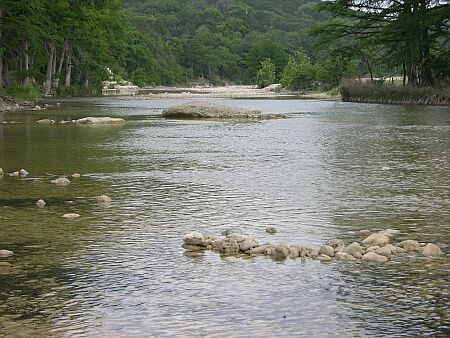
The Frio River flows through Garner State Park in Uvalde County, Texas.

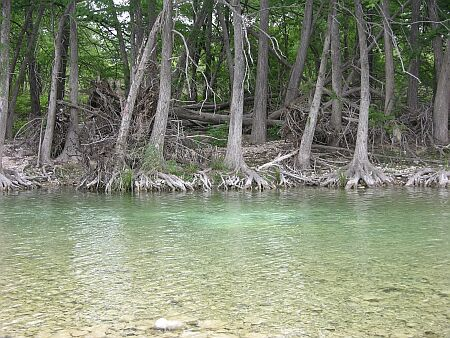
Cypress trees line the waters of the Frio River, located in the Texas Hill Country.

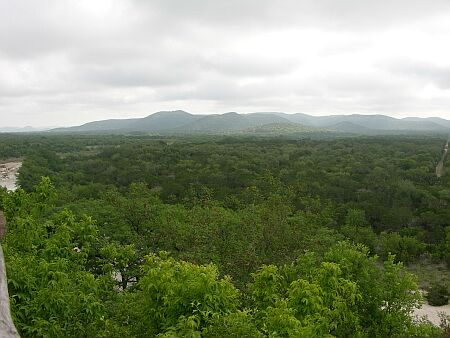
The Frio River snakes through Garner State Park, located in Uvalde County, Texas, in the heart of the Texas Hill Country.

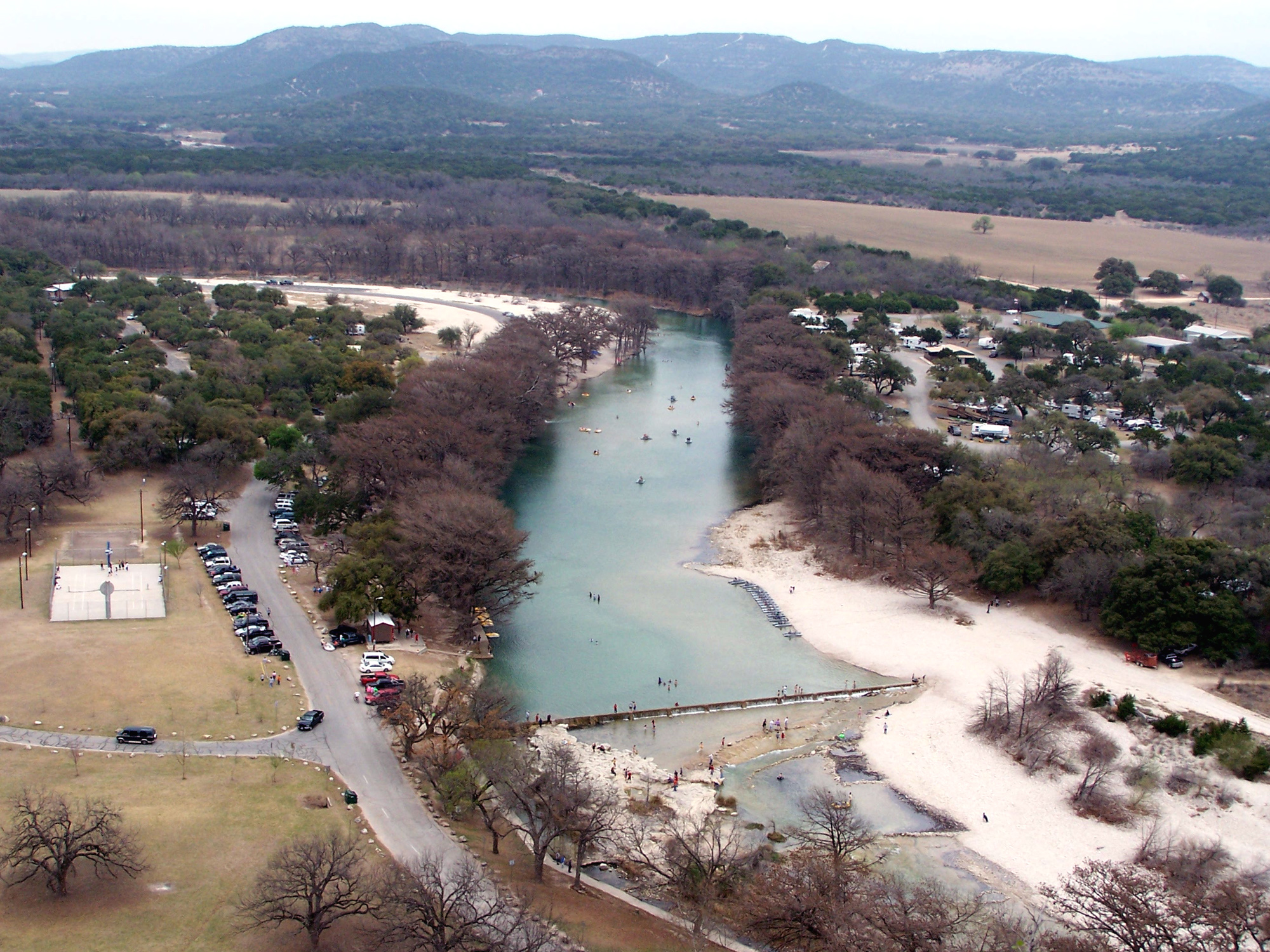
The Frio River winds along the east side of Garner State Park (on the left, showing a dam that forms a swimming area).

== See also ==
- List of rivers of Texas
