= Uvalde =

Uvalde may refer to:

== Places ==
- Uvalde County, Texas, United States
  - Uvalde, Texas
  - Uvalde Estates, Texas
  - Uvalde Consolidated Independent School District
    - Uvalde school shooting, a 2022 mass shooting
- Uvalda, Georgia, United States

== Other uses ==
- Juan de Uvalde (1729–1816), Spanish general and governor of Coahuila, Mexico, New Spain
- USS Uvalde (AKA-88), an American Andromeda-class attack cargo ship

== See also ==
- Ugalde, Basque surname
