= Ugalde =

Ugalde is a Basque surname, the word meaning water-side or river. Notable people with the surname include:

- Antonio Ugalde (born 1976), Spanish handball player who competed in the 2000 Summer Olympics
- Juan de Ugalde (1729–1816), commanding general of Texas, Coahuila, Nuevo León, and Nuevo Santander; also known as "Juan de Uvalde"
- Luis Carlos Ugalde (born 1966), Mexican scholar who served as president of the Federal Electoral Institute from 2003 to 2007
- Unax Ugalde (born 1978), Spanish actor born in Vitoria-Gasteiz, Álava, Spain, in the Basque country
- Ana Bárbara (born Altagracia Ugalde Mota in 1971), Mexican singer-songwriter

Ugalde was also the surname of French singers

- Delphine Ugalde (1829–1910)
- Marguerite Ugalde (1862–1940)

== See also ==
- Estadio Carlos Ugalde Álvarez, multi-use stadium in Ciudad Quesada, Costa Rica
- Thompson/Center Ugalde, a series of wildcat firearm cartridges
- Uvalda, Georgia, a city in the U.S. state of Georgia
- Uvalde, Texas, a city in the U.S. state of Texas
- Uvalde County, Texas, a county in the U.S. state of Texas
- Uvalde (disambiguation)
