= UISD =

UISD may refer to:

- United Independent School District
- Utopia Independent School District
