= Mount Old Baldy =

Mountain in Texas

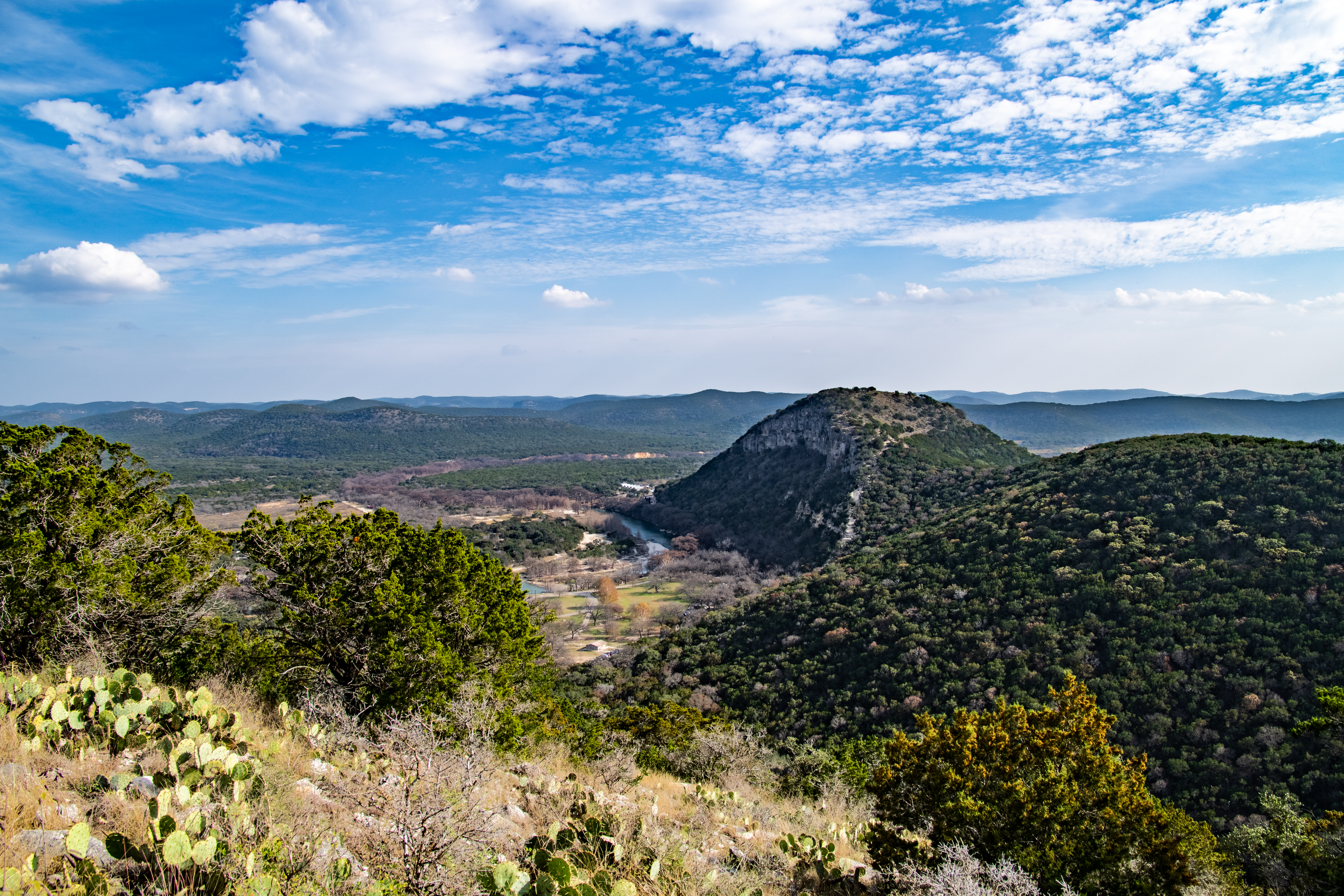
- Old Baldy in Garner State Park, and the Frio River below.

Highest point
- Elevation: 1,849 ft (564 m)
- Coordinates: 29°34′31.8″N 99°43′47.6″W

Geography
- Location within Texas
- Location: Garner State Park, Concan, Uvalde County, Texas
- Country: United States

Mount Ol' Baldy is a hill located in Garner State Park, near the community of Concan, in Uvalde County, Texas, United States. The main trail up the hill is the most popular trail in Garner State Park and clibs nearly 500 feet in elevation above the Frio River. The climb is generally considered to be difficult, due to its steep and rocky terrain.

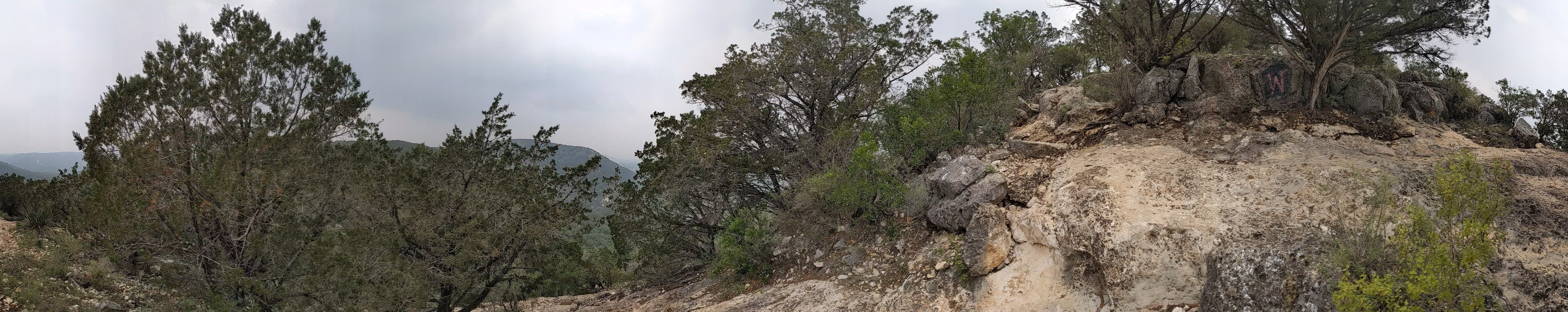
Panoramic outlook near the peak of Mount Old Baldy. The contrast of barren, rocky ground against the foliage alongside its peak represents the "bald head" which serves as the mountain's namesake.

The mountain overlooks a portion of the Frio River, which spans 250 miles of Central Texas.
