= Utopia High School =

Public school in Texas, United States

Location
- 258 School Street; Utopia, Texas 78884-0880; United States; 29.618869°N 99.528334°W

Information
- School type: Public high school
- School district: Utopia Independent School District
- Principal: Kenneth Mueller
- Teaching staff: 18.81 (FTE)
- Grades: PK-12
- Enrollment: 201 (2023–2024)
- Student to teacher ratio: 10.69
- Colors: Maroon & Gold
- Athletics conference: UIL Class A
- Mascot: Buffalo
- Website: Utopia High School

Utopia High School or Utopia School is a public high school located in Utopia, Texas, US, and classified as a 1A school by the University Interscholastic League. It is part of the Utopia Independent School District located in extreme northeast Uvalde County. In 2015, the school was rated "Met Standard" by the Texas Education Agency.

== Athletics ==
The Utopia Buffalos compete in the following sports:

- Basketball
- Cross Country
- Golf
- Tennis
- Track and field
- Volleyball

=== State Titles ===
- Boys' Cross Country
  - 1992 (1A)
- Girls' Cross Country
  - 2014 (1A)
- Girls' Golf
  - 2026 (1A)
- Girls' Track
  - 1974 (B)
- Boys' Track – High Jump
  - 2015 (1A)
- Girls' Doubles Tennis
  - 2016 (1A)
