= Fort Inge =

- Fort Inge Archeological Site
- U.S. National Register of Historic Places
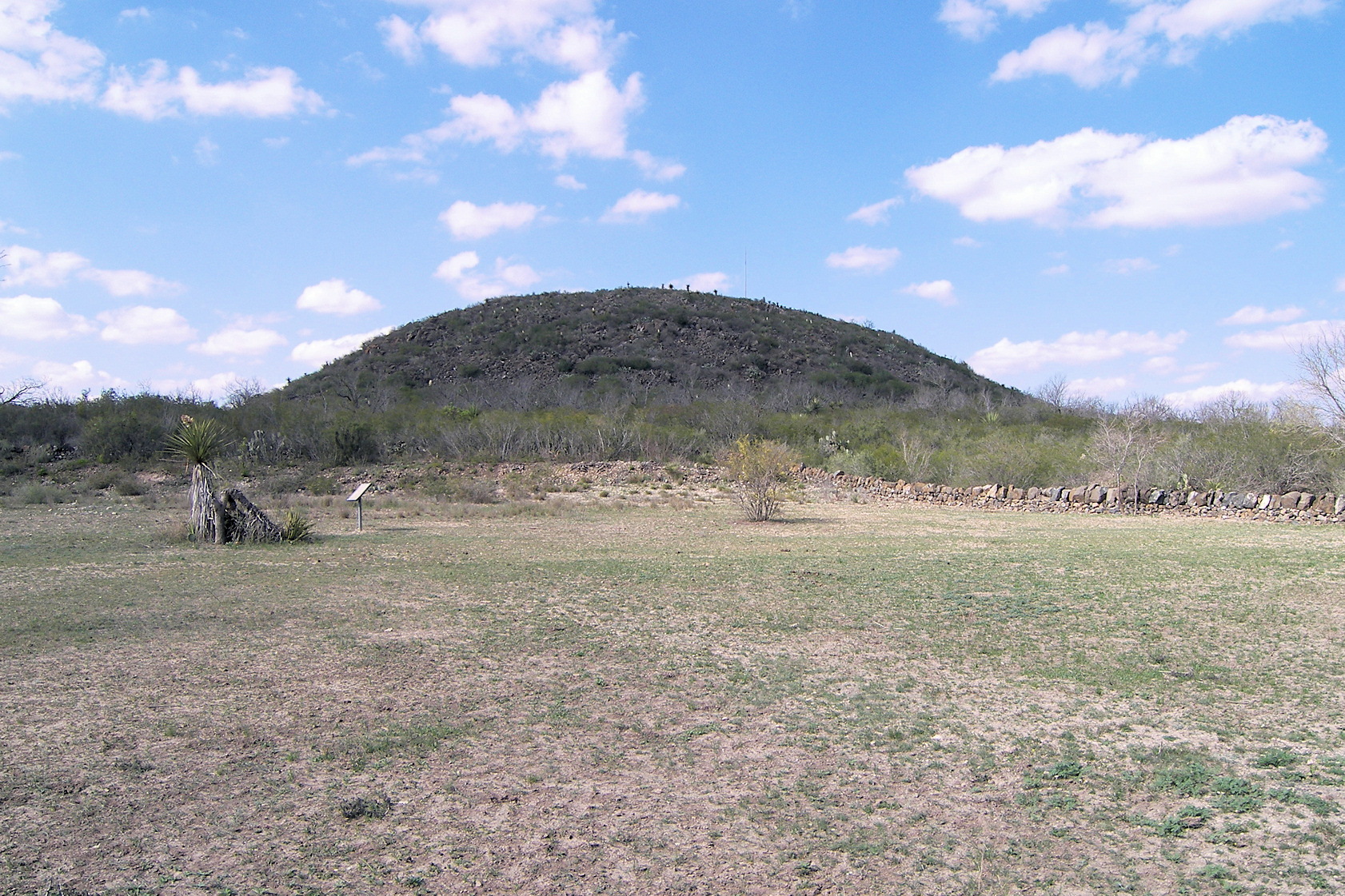
- The site of Fort Inge archeological site with Mount Inge in the background

- Location within Texas Location within the United States
- Location: FM 140 SE of Uvalde, Texas
- Coordinates: 29°10′40″N 99°45′52″W
- Area: 39 acres (16 ha)
- Built: 1849
- NRHP reference No.: 85002298
- Added to NRHP: September 12, 1985

Fort Inge was a frontier fort in Uvalde County, Texas, United States.

== History ==
Established as Camp Leona on March 13, 1849, Fort Inge was garrisoned intermittently until March 19, 1869. The fort served as a base for United States Army troops assigned to protect the southern overland mail route along the San Antonio-El Paso Road from Indian raids. The camp was renamed Fort Inge in honor of Lieutenant Zebulon M. P. Inge, a West Point officer killed in the Mexican–American War. Other forts in the frontier fort system were Forts Griffin, Concho, Belknap, Chadbourne, Stockton, Davis, Bliss, Mason, McKavett, Clark, McIntosh, Richardson, and Phantom Hill in Texas, and Sill in Oklahoma. Also in the system were "subposts or intermediate stations", including Bothwick's Station on Salt Creek between Fort Richardson and Fort Belknap, Camp Wichita near Buffalo Springs between Fort Richardson and Red River Station, and Mountain Pass between Fort Concho and Fort Griffin.

Two wooden barracks with thatched roofs quartered the soldiers assigned to the fort. Also, a large limestone building served as commissary and later a hospital. The buildings at Ft. Inge were never sufficient for the troops stationed there, probably because this post was never determined by the Army to be a permanent post. It was started in 1849, but abandoned in the spring of 1851. It was reoccupied that same summer and occupied until 1855, when it was abandoned again. It was reoccupied a third time in 1856, but was abandoned in 1861 to Confederate States Army troops. It was again garrisoned briefly in 1865 by the 4th Wisconsin Cavalry.

The United States Army regarrisoned the fort until March 19, 1869, when the garrison was transferred to Fort McKavett. The army recovered materials from the site to use for additions to nearby Fort Clark. Fort Inge then was used as a camp by the Texas Rangers until 1884.

The fort was surrounded on three sides by a stacked stone wall added around the time of the Civil War. The wall was dismantled in 1874, and the stone was used to build a dam on the Leona River. The wall was relaid along its original lines in 1984.

Jerome Napoleon Bonaparte II was posted to Fort Inge in the early 1850s, and his letters from there are preserved by the Maryland Historical Society.

=== Major Neighbors ===
Robert Neighbors arrived at the fort on 7 April 1854, investigating Indian depredations, and found the raiding party consisted of 12 Tonkawas, two of whom were killed and nine turned over to the fort. Neighbors also freed the Lipan Chief Chiquito and his men from the guard house, and charged Indian Agent Howard with "dereliction of duty" for their false arrest and mismanagement of the Indian situation.

== Park ==
In 1961, the site became the Fort Inge Historical Site County Park. It was added to the National Register of Historic Places on September 12, 1985. The site is located on the Leona River, and is dominated by the 140-ft-high (43 m) remains of an extinct volcano named Mount Inge.

== Gallery ==
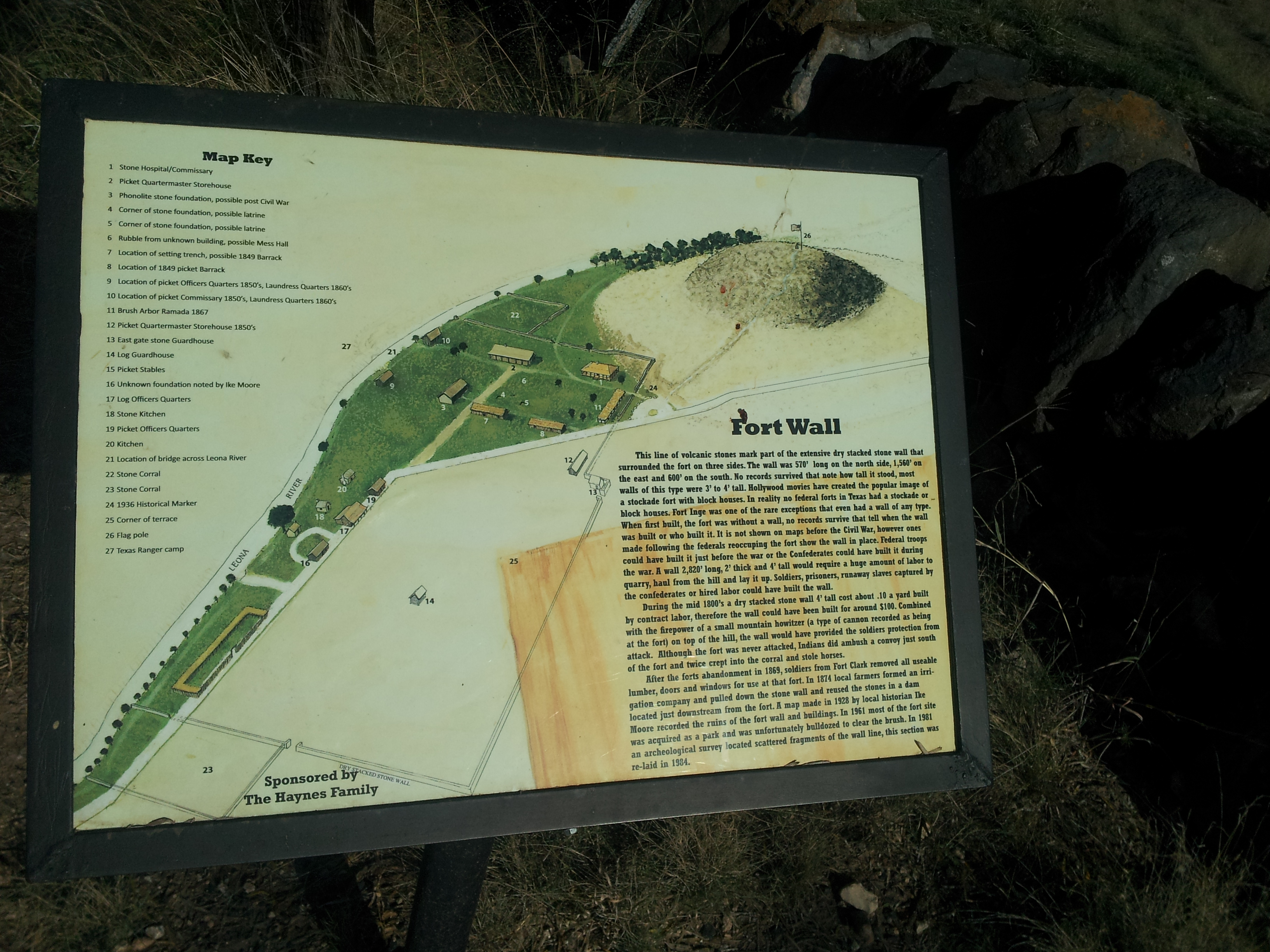
Fort Inge

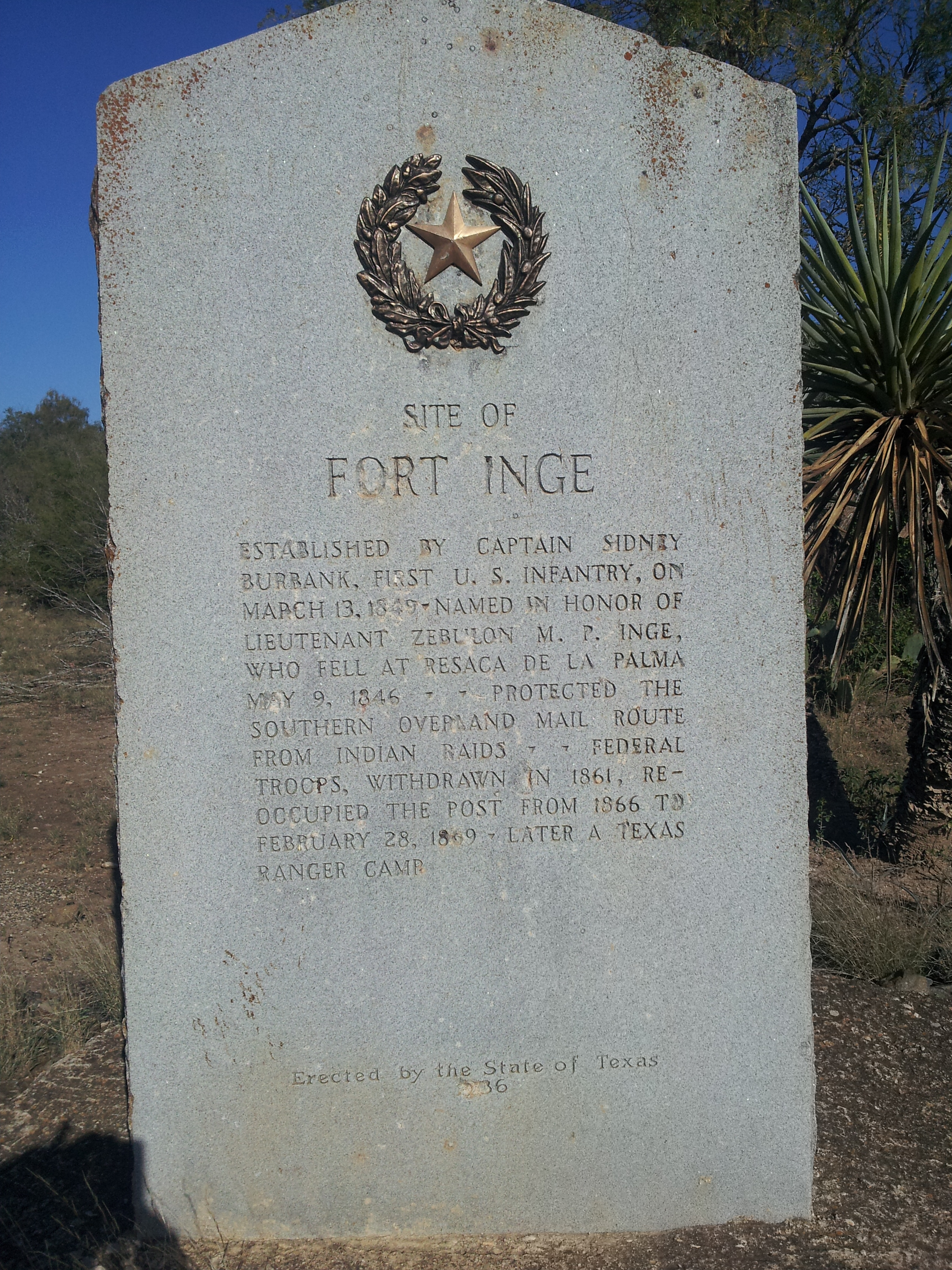
Fort Inge

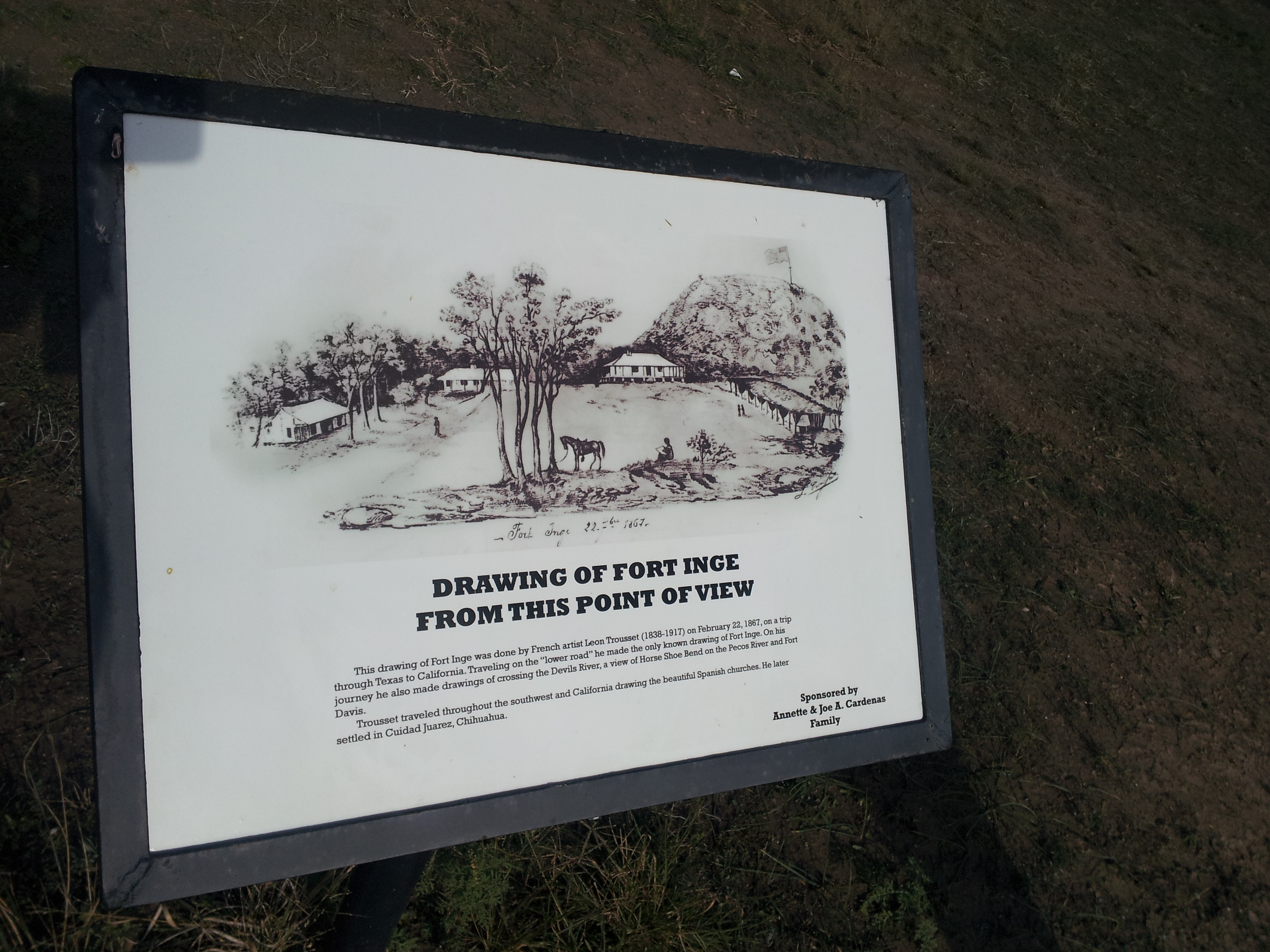
Trousset's 1867 drawing

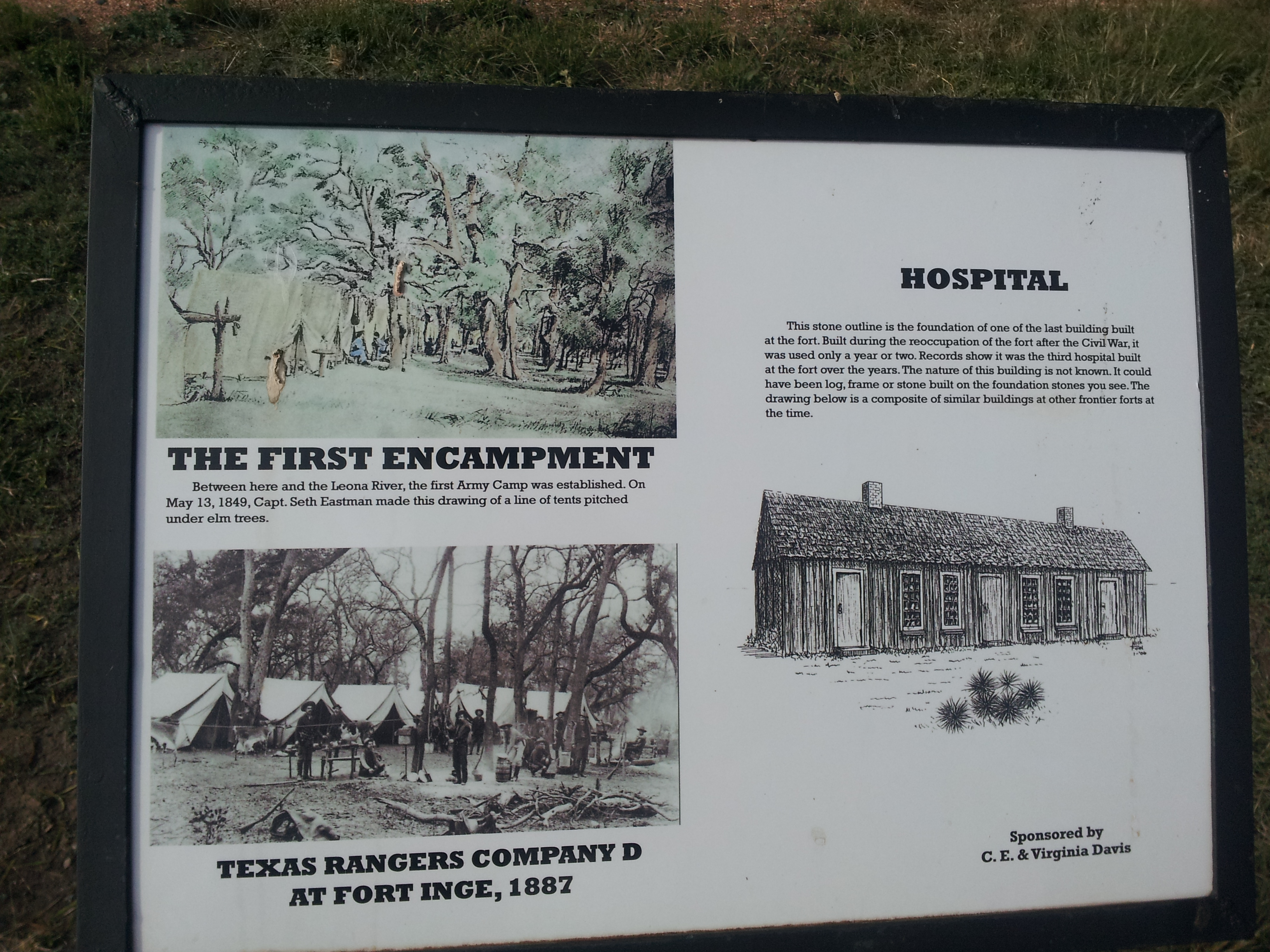
Eastman's 1849 drawing

== See also ==
- National Register of Historic Places listings in Uvalde County, Texas
- Forts of Texas
