= National Register of Historic Places listings in Uvalde County, Texas =

Location of Uvalde County in Texas

This is a list of the National Register of Historic Places listings in Uvalde County, Texas.

This is intended to be a complete list of properties listed on the National Register of Historic Places in Uvalde County, Texas. There is one historic district and ten properties listed on the National Register in the county including one National Historic Landmark (NHL). The NHL site is also a State Antiquities Landmark and a Recorded Texas Historic Landmark (RTHL) while two additional properties are also RTHLs.

This National Park Service list is complete through NPS recent listings posted March 21, 2025.

== Current listings ==
The publicly disclosed locations of National Register properties may be seen in a mapping service provided.

	Name on the Register	Image	Date listed	Location	City or town	Description
1	First National Bank	First National Bank	March 31, 2014 (#14000106)	100 S. East St. 29°12′35″N 99°47′07″W	Uvalde	
2	Fort Inge Archeological Site	Fort Inge Archeological Site	September 12, 1985 (#85002298)	Southeast of Uvalde off FM 140; 29°10′45″N 99°45′57″W	Uvalde	Remnants of a frontier fort established in 1849. Now a county park.
3	John Nance Garner House	John Nance Garner House	December 8, 1976 (#76002074)	333 N. Park St. 29°12′45″N 99°47′33″W	Uvalde	State Antiquities Landmark, Recorded Texas Historic Landmark; former home of John Nance Garner, 32nd Vice-President of the United States. Now a museum about his life and times.
4	Grand Opera House	Grand Opera House	May 22, 1978 (#78002996)	E. North and N. Getty Sts. 29°12′37″N 99°47′12″W	Uvalde	Recorded Texas Historic Landmark; built in 1891 for plays, musicals, and cultural performances. It still serves the same function today making it the oldest functioning theater in the state of Texas.
5	Leona River Archeological Site	Leona River Archeological Site	May 6, 1976 (#76002075)	Address restricted	Uvalde	
6	Nicolas Street School	Nicolas Street School	November 27, 2010 (#10000963)	332 Nicolas Street; 29°12′08″N 99°47′35″W	Uvalde	Recorded Texas Historic Landmark
7	State Highway 3 Bridge at the Nueces River	State Highway 3 Bridge at the Nueces River	October 10, 1996 (#96001108)	US 90, 13 mi (21 km). E of jct. with Kinney Cnty. 29°12′20″N 99°54′07″W	Uvalde	
8	Taylor Slough Archeological Site	Taylor Slough Archeological Site	May 4, 1976 (#76002076)	Address restricted	Uvalde	
9	Uvalde Downtown Historic District	Uvalde Downtown Historic District	May 31, 2019 (#100004009)	Centered around jct. of US 90 & US 83, roughly bounded by School Ln., Hornby Pl., 2nd Alley & High St. 29°12′35″N 99°47′12″W	Uvalde	
10	Uvalde Flint Quarry	Uvalde Flint Quarry	June 3, 1976 (#76002077)	Address restricted	Uvalde	
11	Willingham Site	Willingham Site	April 26, 1976 (#76002078)	Address restricted	Uvalde	

== See also ==
- National Register of Historic Places listings in Texas
- Recorded Texas Historic Landmarks in Uvalde County
