= Knippa, Texas =

- Census-designated place
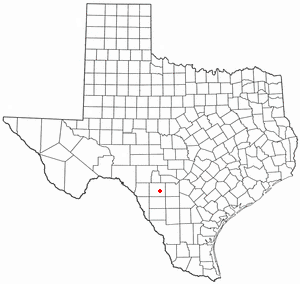
- Location of Knippa, Texas

- Coordinates: 29°18′28″N 99°37′50″W
- Country: United States
- State: Texas
- County: Uvalde

Area
  - Total: 5.2 sq mi (13.5 km^{2})
  - Land: 5.1 sq mi (13.2 km^{2})
  - Water: 0.077 sq mi (0.2 km^{2})
- Elevation: 994 ft (303 m)

Population (2020)
  - Total: 606
  - Density: 119/sq mi (45.9/km^{2})
- Time zone: UTC-6 (Central (CST))
  - Summer (DST): UTC-5 (CDT)
- ZIP code: 78870
- Area code: 830
- FIPS code: 48-39664
- GNIS feature ID: 2408497

Knippa (/kəˈnɪpə/ kə-NIP-ə) is a census-designated place (CDP) in Uvalde County, Texas, United States. Its population was 606 at the 2020 census, down from 689 in 2010. It is part of the Uvalde, Texas micropolitan statistical area.

== Geography ==
Knippa is accessible via U.S. Route 90 and Farm to Market Road 1049.

According to the United States Census Bureau, the CDP has a total area of 5.2 square miles (13.5 km^{2}), of which 0.08 square miles (0.2 km^{2}), or 1.82%, is covered by water.

== Demographics ==
Historical population
Census	Pop.	Note	%±
2000	739		—
2010	689		−6.8%
2020	606		−12.0%
U.S. Decennial Census; 1850–1900 1910; 1920 1930 1940; 1950 1960 1970; 1980 1990 2000; 2010 2020

Knippa first appeared as a CDP in the 2000 U.S. census.

=== 2020 census ===
Knippa CDP, Texas – Racial and ethnic composition Note: the US Census treats Hispanic/Latino as an ethnic category. This table excludes Latinos from the racial categories and assigns them to a separate category. Hispanics/Latinos may be of any race.
Race / Ethnicity (NH = Non-Hispanic)	Pop 2000	Pop 2010	Pop 2020	% 2000	% 2010	% 2020
White alone (NH)	318	265	217	43.03%	38.46%	35.81%
Black or African American alone (NH)	2	1	8	0.27%	0.15%	1.32%
Native American or Alaska Native alone (NH)	5	2	2	0.68%	0.29%	0.33%
Asian alone (NH)	0	0	1	0.00%	0.00%	0.17%
Native Hawaiian or Pacific Islander alone (NH)	0	0	0	0.00%	0.00%	0.00%
Other race alone (NH)	0	0	0	0.00%	0.00%	0.00%
Multiracial (NH)	5	1	20	0.68%	0.15%	3.30%
Hispanic or Latino (any race)	409	420	358	55.35%	60.96%	59.08%
Total	739	689	606	100.00%	100.00%	100.00%

As of the census of 2000, 739 people, 246 households, and 180 families resided in the CDP. The population density was 70.9 inhabitants per square mile (27.4/km^{2}). There were 280 housing units at an average density of 26.9 per square mile (10.4/km^{2}). The racial makeup of the CDP was 71.58% White, 0.27% African American, 0.81% Native American, 0.41% Pacific Islander, 20.57% from other races, and 6.36% from two or more races. Hispanic or Latino people of any race were 55.35% of the population.

Of the 246 households, 42.7% had children under 18 living with them, 60.6% were married couples living together, 10.2% had a female householder with no husband present, and 26.8% were not families. About 24.8% of all households were made up of individuals, and 9.3% had someone living alone who was 65 or older. The average household size was 3.00, and the average family size was 3.69.

In the CDP, the age distribution was 33.6% under 18, 10.3% from 18 to 24, 27.2% from 25 to 44, 19.8% from 45 to 64, and 9.2% who were 65 or older. The median age was 30 years. For every 100 females, there were 98.7 males. For every 100 females 18 and over, there were 97.2 males.

The median income for a household in the CDP was $29,375 and for a family was $31,667. Males had a median income of $20,741 versus $19,722 for females. The per capita income for the CDP was $9,790. About 15.5% of families and 20.0% of the population were below the poverty line, including 24.1% of those under 18 and 23.2% of those 65 or over.

== Education ==
Knippa is served by the Knippa Independent School District.

== Climate ==
The climate in this area is characterized by hot, humid summers and generally mild to cool winters. According to the Köppen climate classification, Knippa has a humid subtropical climate, Cfa on climate maps.
