= Garner Field =

Airport in Uvade County, Texas

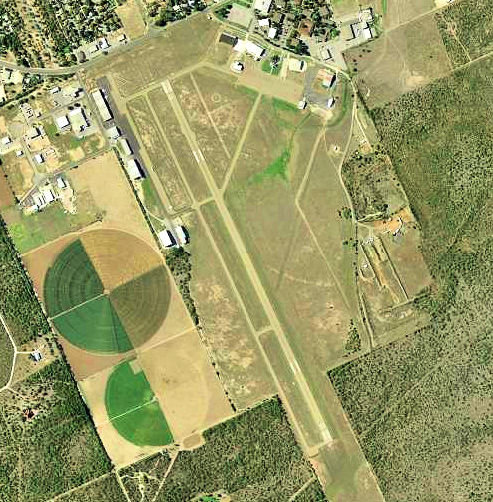
- 2006 USGS Photo
- IATA: UVA; ICAO: KUVA; FAA LID: UVA

Summary
- Airport type: Public
- Owner: City of Uvalde
- Serves: Uvalde, Texas
- Elevation AMSL: 942 ft (287 m)
- Coordinates: 29°12′41″N 099°44′37″W

Map
- Location within Texas

Runways
Direction	Length		Surface
Direction	ft	m	Surface
15/33	5,256	1,602	Asphalt

Statistics (2023)
- Aircraft operations (year ending 5/28/2023): 12,565
- Based aircraft: 45
- Source: Federal Aviation Administration

Garner Field (IATA: UVA, ICAO: KUVA, FAA LID: UVA) is an airport in Uvalde County, Texas, three miles east of the city of Uvalde, which owns it. It is named for John Nance Garner, 32nd Vice President of the United States.

== History ==
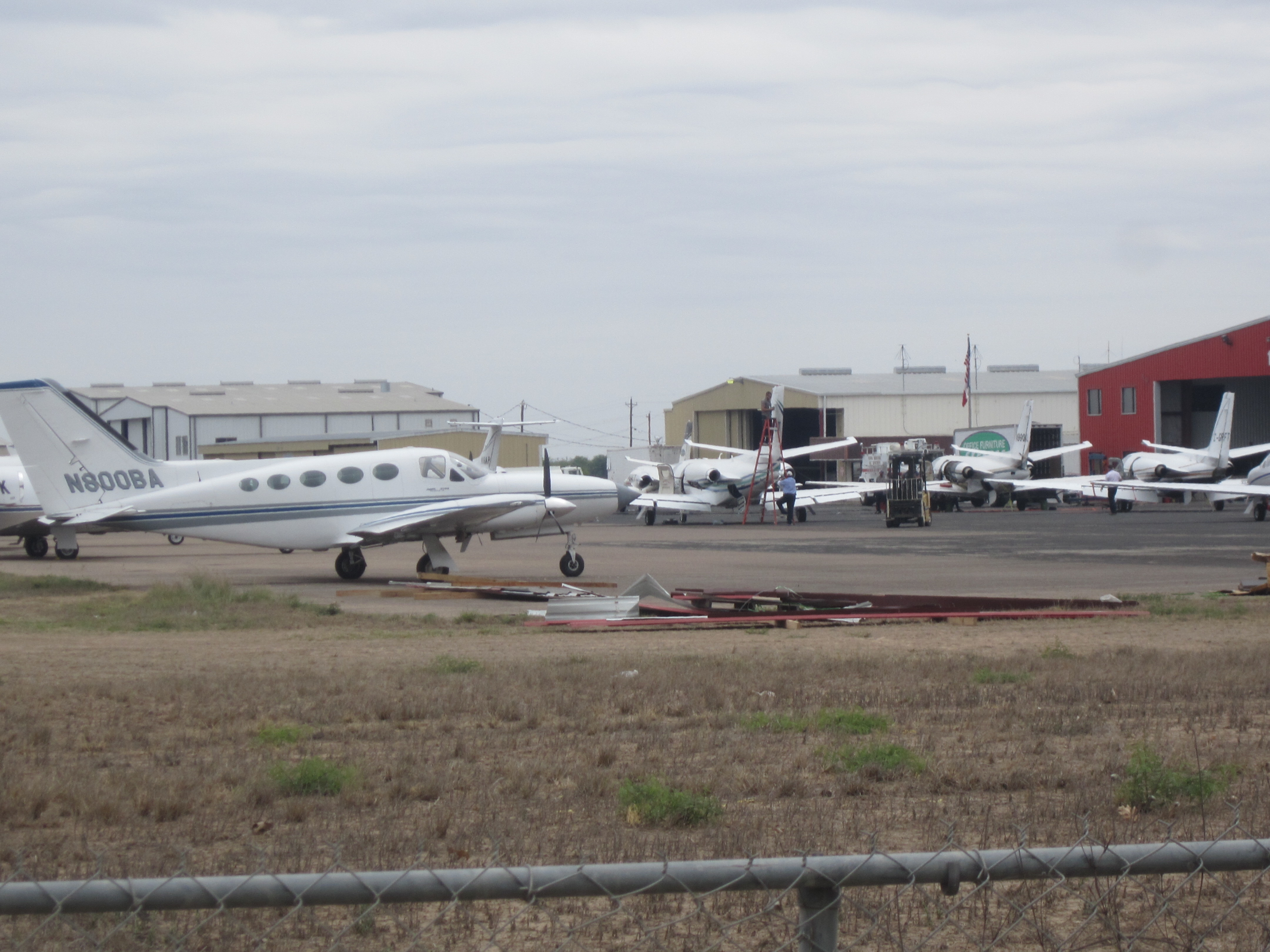
Garner Field

Opened in October 1941 with three 6,000 ft hard surfaced runways, (00/18; 04/27; 15/33). Began training United States Army Air Corps flying cadets under contract to Hangar Six Corp with 305th Flying Training Detachment (Contract Pilot School). Assigned to Gulf Coast Training Center (later Central Flying Training Command) as a primary (level 1) pilot training airfield. Hangar Six, Inc. conducted pilot training. Airfield had four local auxiliary airfields for emergency and overflow landings. Flying training used Fairchild PT-19s as the primary trainer. Also had several PT-17 Stearmans and a few P-40 Warhawks.

Inactivated on 30 June 1945 with the drawdown of AAFTC's pilot training program. Declared surplus and turned over to the Army Corps of Engineers on 30 September 1945. Eventually discharged to the War Assets Administration (WAA) and became a civil airport. Little of the wartime airfield still exists, as most of the airfield has been rebuilt as Southwest Texas Junior College.

== Airlines ==
- Trans-Texas Airways DC-3s landed at Uvalde from 1948 to 1954.
- Uvalde Aero Service ran, from 1965 until 1977, scheduled commuter services to other cities in Texas, and an air-mail route to San Antonio. The airline operated Lockheed L-12 Electra Junior, Piper Navajo and Piper Twin Comanche

== Facilities ==
Garner Field covers 356 acres (144 ha) at an elevation of 942 feet (287 m). Its one runway, 15/33, is 5,256 by 100 ft (1,602 x 30 m) asphalt.

In the year ending May 28, 2023, the airport had 12,565 aircraft operations, average 34 per day: 96% general aviation, 2% air taxi and 2% military. 45 aircraft were then based at the airport: 28 single-engine, 8 multi-engine, 6 jet, 1 helicopter and 2 glider.

== See also ==
- Texas World War II Army Airfields
- 31st Flying Training Wing (World War II)
- List of airports in Texas
