= Grand Opera House (Uvalde, Texas) =

- U.S. National Register of Historic Places
- Recorded Texas Historic Landmark
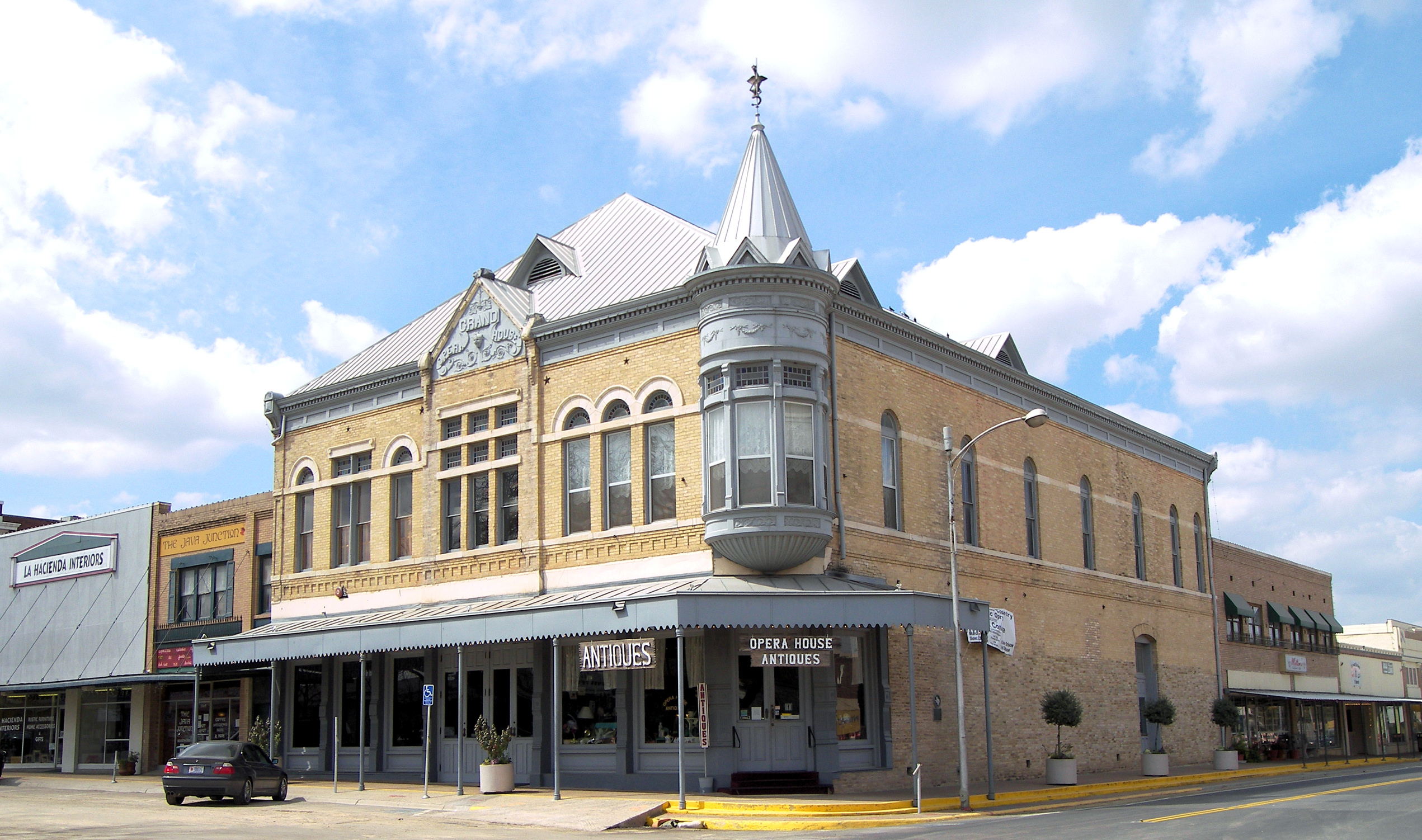
- The Janey Slaughter Briscoe Grand Opera House in 2007.

- Location within Texas Location within the United States
- Location: 104 W. North St. Uvalde, Texas
- Coordinates: 29°12′36″N 99°47′11″W
- Area: less than one acre
- Built: 1891
- Architect: B.F. Frester
- Architectural style: Romanesque
- NRHP reference No.: 78002996
- RTHL No.: 2249

Significant dates
- Added to NRHP: May 22, 1978
- Designated RTHL: 1967

The Grand Opera House, also known as the Janey Slaughter Briscoe Grand Opera House, is a historic theater in Uvalde, Texas. Built in 1891, it became a premier arts venue in Southwest Texas for plays, musicals, and cultural performances. The Opera House is the oldest functioning theater in the state of Texas and presents plays and concerts by local and touring companies. It was added to the National Register of Historic Places on May 22, 1978.

The Opera House was built by a partnership formed between local businessmen, merchants and ranchers called the Uvalde Real Estate and Building Company. The 2-story brick structure has Richardsonian Romanesque elements in its architecture. In typical Texas opera house style of the period, the building has the auditorium above commercial spaces on the first floor. There were also fashionable offices on the second floor. The Opera House was an immediate success and became the social center of Uvalde and quite well known throughout the region.

The building was sold to Fred Locke in 1900 and the John Nance Garner family in 1916. By the early 1940s, most of the office tenants had moved out, and the building went through a period of decline. In July, 1978, the dilapidated property, now owned by the descendants of Garner, was donated to the City of Uvalde. The city restored the Opera House to its 1890 condition.

== See also ==
- National Register of Historic Places listings in Uvalde County, Texas
- Recorded Texas Historic Landmarks in Uvalde County
