= Reading Wood Black =

American Texan politician (1830–1867)

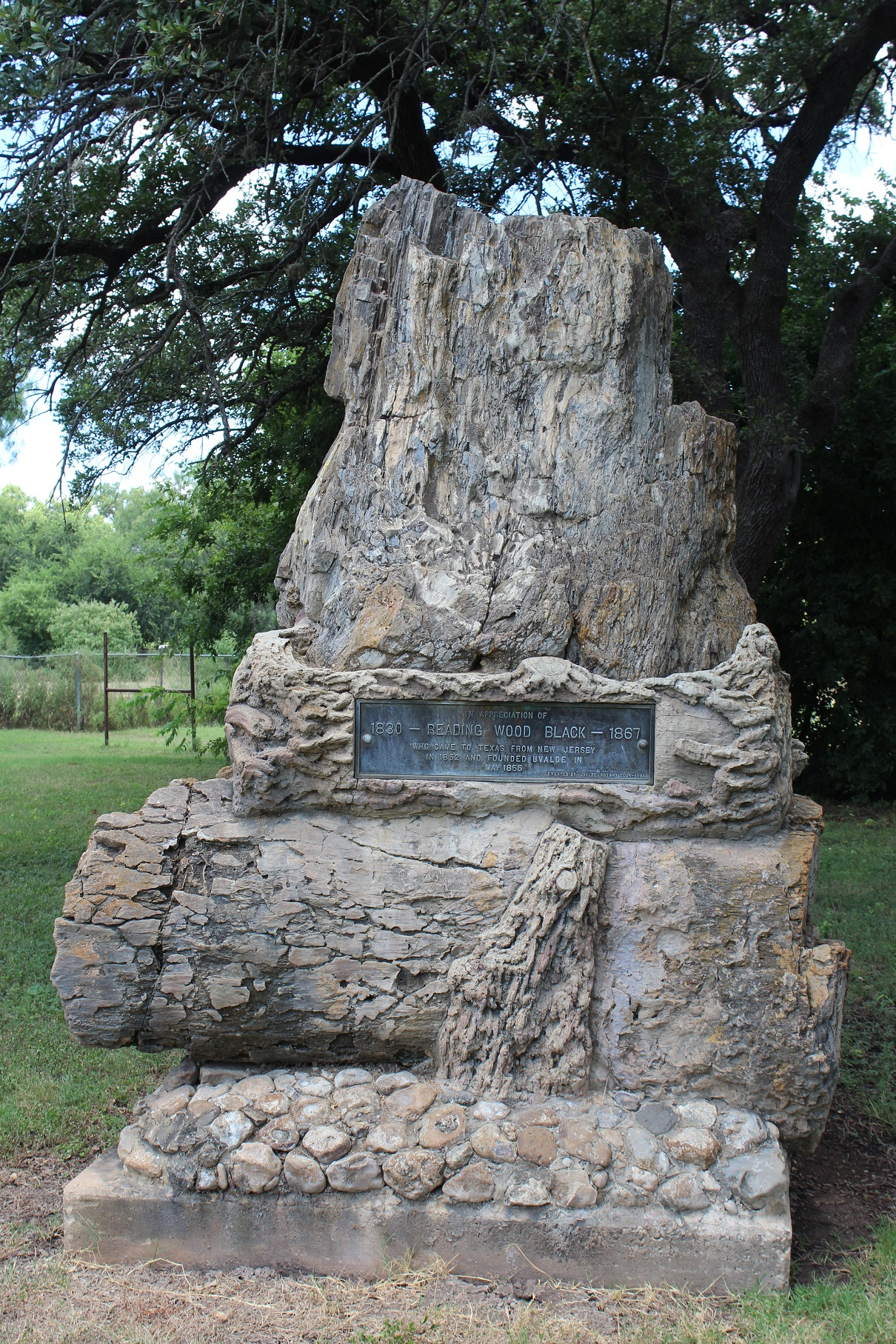
- Memorial stone to Black in Pioneer Park, Uvalde, Texas
- Born: September 23, 1830; Springfield Township, Burlington County, New Jersey, US
- Died: October 3, 1867 (aged 37); Uvalde, Texas, US
- Known for: Founder of Uvalde, Texas

Reading Wood Black (September 23, 1830 – October 3, 1867) was the father of Uvalde County, Texas and city of Uvalde, Texas, which he founded as the town of Encina. In 1979, Recorded Texas Historic Landmark 4209 was placed in the Hillcrest Cemetery to honor Reading Wood Black. In 1997, Recorded Texas Historic Landmark 4208 was placed at the intersection of East Street and U.S. 90, to mark the site of the former home and trading post of Reading Wood Black.

== Early life ==
He was born in Springfield Township, Burlington County, New Jersey, into a wealthy Quaker family. By age 17, he was owner and manager of the 144-acre (0.58 km^{2}) Clover Hill Farm in North Hampton Township.

Black's cousin William Reading Montgomery established Fort Gates in Coryell County and held sway over Black's decision to explore Texas. Black left for Texas in 1852, along with his friend Nathan L. Stratton.

== Founding and development of Uvalde ==
Black and Stratton purchased an undivided league and labor on the Leona River in 1853 at the future site of Uvalde. Black then began raising sheep. He opened a store, cleared a garden, and operated a limekiln and two rock quarries.

In 1854, he purchased 640 acres (2.6 km^{2}) more for town expansion and stock raising.

On May 2, 1855, Black hired San Antonio lithographer Wilhelm Carl August Thielepape, and laid out Encina, which would later be known as Uvalde. The town was divided into 464 lots, a schoolhouse square, a cemetery, a park, a garden and four town plazas. Black named the plazas the Market, the Post Office, Townhall and the Courthouse.

In September 1855 he established the first school in what was to be Uvalde County, and in November he successfully lobbied the state legislature to organize Uvalde County. On April 21, 1856, he was elected county commissioner. On May 12, he and his fellow commissioners completed formal organization. On June 14, Encina was named county seat.

Between January – December 1856, Black was a Captain of the Texas Rangers Minutemen of Uvalde County. During this period, his company helped defeat a Comanche war party some thirty miles south of Uvalde.

Black was re-elected county commissioner in 1858, and in that same year built a gristmill.

He was elected county judge in 1860. His wagon train enterprise of 1860 freighted between San Antonio and Piedras Negras, Coahuila.

On January 6, 1859, he married Permilia Jane McKinney.

== Mexico, return and death ==
Opposed to secession from the Union, Black was disgusted by the murder of several prisoners during the Nueces massacre by the Confederate home guards. Black moved to Coahuila, Mexico until the end of the war, by which time he had amassed property and $50,000.

In 1866, he was elected to the legislature from the 72nd district, where he strongly supported ratification of the Fourteenth Amendment, designed to protect the citizenship of recently freed slaves. He felt that failure to support the amendment would be interpreted as disloyalty to the Union. Black did not stand for re-election.

Black's attempt to form a strong local Union League has been debated as a factor in his murder by friend George Washington "Tom" Wall on October 3, 1867. Others offer the point of view that the murder was the result of a falling out between the two friends over money from a business deal.

In 1979, Recorded Texas Historic Landmark 4209 was placed in the Hillcrest Cemetery to honor Reading Wood Black. In 1997, Recorded Texas Historic Landmark 4208 was placed at the intersection of East Street and U.S. 90, to mark the site of the former home and trading post of Reading Wood Black.
