= Utopia, Texas =

- Census-designated place
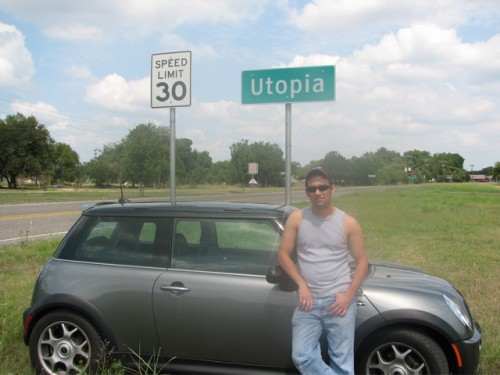
- Utopia in 2006
- Nickname: "An Ideally, Perfect Place"
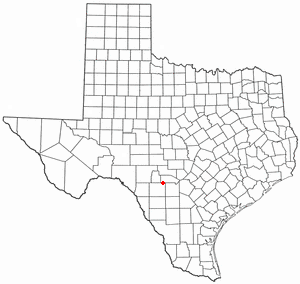
- Location of Utopia, Texas

- Coordinates: 29°37′15″N 99°30′45″W
- Country: United States
- State: Texas
- County: Uvalde

Area
  - Total: 2.9 sq mi (7.6 km^{2})
  - Land: 2.9 sq mi (7.6 km^{2})
  - Water: 0 sq mi (0.0 km^{2})
- Elevation: 1,371 ft (418 m)

Population (2020)
  - Total: 225
  - Density: 77/sq mi (30/km^{2})
- Time zone: UTC-6 (Central (CST))
  - Summer (DST): UTC-5 (CDT)
- ZIP code: 78884
- Area code: 830
- FIPS code: 48-74576
- GNIS feature ID: 2409383
- Website: www.utopiatexas.info

Utopia is a census-designated place (CDP) in Uvalde County, Texas, United States. The population was 225 at the 2020 census.

== History ==
After the failure of the La Réunion colony in Dallas, Texas, Victor Prosper Considerant purchased 47000 acres of land in Sabinal Canyon in Uvalde County with the hopes of founding another utopian socialist settlement. That settlement never materialized.

In 1884, a survey was platted for the town of Montana, Texas in Uvalde County; upon discovering that the name Montana was already taken, the name was changed to Utopia. Utopia replaced the previous community of Waresville as the local post office; to this day the cemetery is named for Waresville.

Tourism to the city boomed after the 1979 establishment of the Lost Maples State Natural Area nearby; Utopia is also near Garner State Park.

== Geography ==
According to the United States Census Bureau, the CDP has a total area of 3.0 square miles (7.6 km^{2}), all land.

=== Climate ===
According to the Köppen Climate Classification system, Utopia has a humid subtropical climate, abbreviated "Cfa" on climate maps.

== Demographics ==
Historical population
Census	Pop.	Note	%±
2000	241		—
2010	227		−5.8%
2020	225		−0.9%
U.S. Decennial Census; 1850–1900 1910; 1920 1930 1940; 1950 1960 1970; 1980 1990 2000; 2010 2020

Utopia first appeared as a census designated place in the 2000 U.S. census.

=== 2020 census ===
Utopia CDP, Texas – Racial and ethnic composition Note: the US Census treats Hispanic/Latino as an ethnic category. This table excludes Latinos from the racial categories and assigns them to a separate category. Hispanics/Latinos may be of any race.
Race / Ethnicity (NH = Non-Hispanic)	Pop 2000	Pop 2010	Pop 2020	% 2000	% 2010	% 2020
White alone (NH)	219	203	184	90.87%	89.43%	81.78%
Black or African American alone (NH)	0	0	0	0.00%	0.00%	0.00%
Native American or Alaska Native alone (NH)	1	0	0	0.41%	0.00%	0.00%
Asian alone (NH)	0	0	0	0.00%	0.00%	0.00%
Native Hawaiian or Pacific Islander alone (NH)	0	1	0	0.00%	0.44%	0.00%
Other race alone (NH)	0	1	2	0.00%	0.44%	0.89%
Mixed race or Multiracial (NH)	1	1	11	0.41%	0.44%	4.89%
Hispanic or Latino (any race)	20	21	28	8.30%	9.25%	12.44%
Total	241	227	225	100.00%	100.00%	100.00%

=== 2000 Census ===
As of the census of 2000, there were 241 people, 111 households, and 69 families residing in the CDP. The population density was 81.6 inhabitants per square mile (31.5/km^{2}). There were 127 housing units at an average density of 43.0 per square mile (16.6/km^{2}). The racial makeup of the CDP was 93.36% White, 0.41% Native American, 4.56% from other races, and 1.66% from two or more races. Hispanic or Latino of any race were 8.30% of the population.

There were 111 households, out of which 23.4% had children under the age of 18 living with them, 52.3% were married couples living together, 9.0% had a female householder with no husband present, and 37.8% were non-families. 35.1% of all households were made up of individuals, and 22.5% had someone living alone who was 65 years of age or older. The average household size was 2.17 and the average family size was 2.77.

In the CDP, the population was spread out, with 23.2% under the age of 18, 4.1% from 18 to 24, 21.6% from 25 to 44, 23.7% from 45 to 64, and 27.4% who were 65 years of age or older. The median age was 46 years. For every 100 females, there were 92.8 males. For every 100 females age 18 and over, there were 88.8 males.

The median income for a household in the CDP was $28,281, and the median income for a family was $35,893. Males had a median income of $25,714 versus $16,667 for females. The per capita income for the CDP was $18,608. About 15.5% of families and 19.6% of the population were below the poverty line, including 16.9% of those under the age of eighteen and 21.5% of those 65 or over.

== Education ==
Utopia is served by the Utopia Independent School District which operates Utopia High School.

== Utopia in popular culture ==
The 2011 movie Seven Days in Utopia is based on the book Golf's Sacred Journey: Seven Days at the Links of Utopia and was filmed primarily in Utopia.

On July 26th, 2023, in promotion for Travis Scott's 4th studio album, Utopia, Utopia totems were found in Utopia, Texas, playing a siren-like sound.
