= John Nance Garner House =

Historic house in Texas, United States

- U.S. National Register of Historic Places
- U.S. National Historic Landmark
- Texas State Antiquities Landmark
- Recorded Texas Historic Landmark
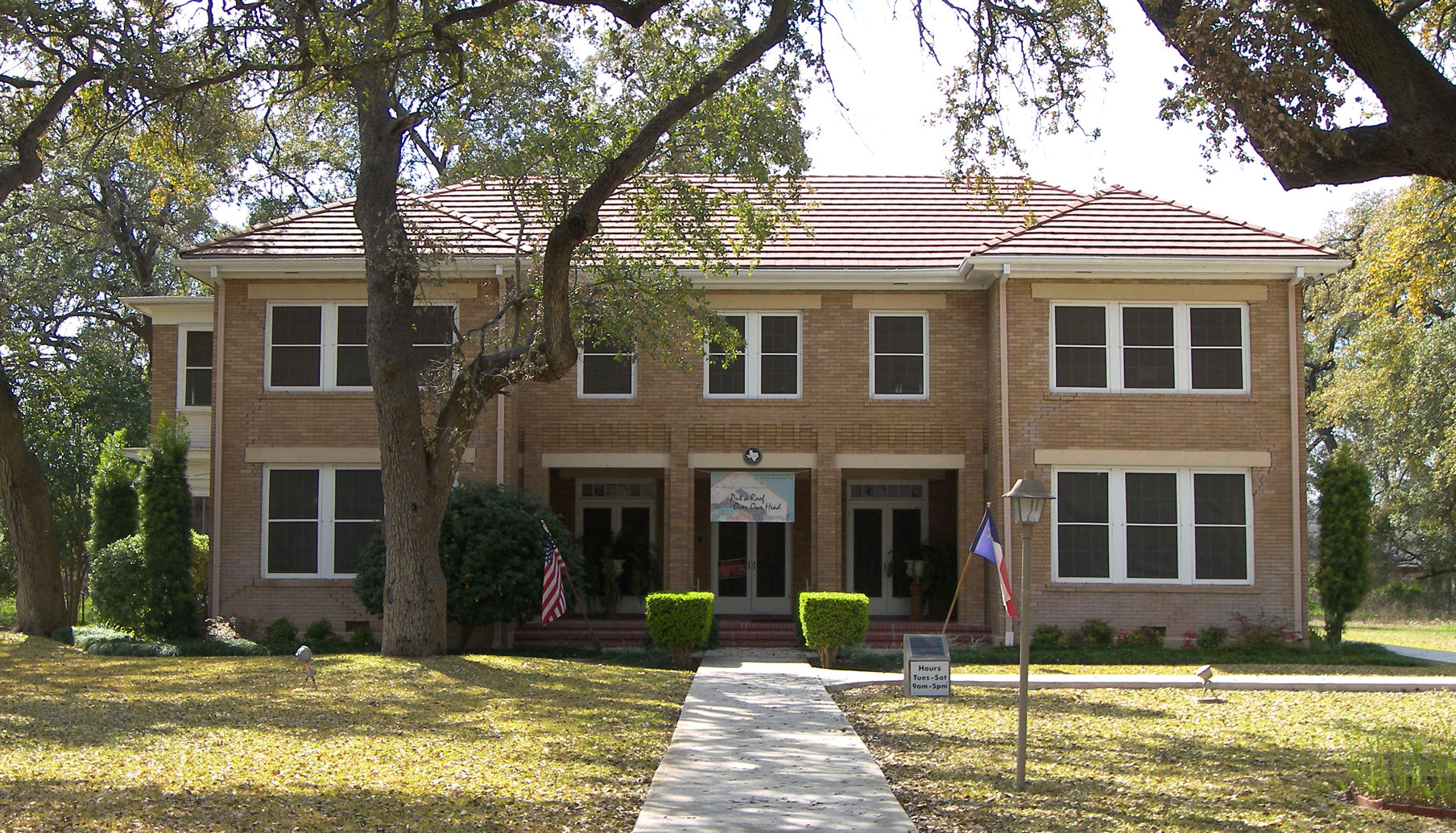
- The John Nance Garner House

- Location within Texas Location within the United States
- Interactive map showing the location of John Nance Garner House
- Location: 333 N. Park St., Uvalde, Texas
- Coordinates: 29°12′44″N 99°47′32″W
- Area: 3.5 acres (1.4 ha)
- Built: 1920
- Architect: Atlee B. Ayres
- NRHP reference No.: 76002074
- TSAL No.: 646
- RTHL No.: 2795

Significant dates
- Added to NRHP: December 8, 1976
- Designated NHL: December 8, 1976
- Designated TSAL: May 28, 1981
- Designated RTHL: 1962

The John Nance Garner House, located in Uvalde, Texas, United States, was the home of American Vice-President John Nance Garner and his wife Ettie from 1920 until Ettie's death in 1948. Garner, a native of Uvalde, lived there until 1952, when he moved to a small cottage on the property and donated the main house to the City of Uvalde as a memorial to Mrs. Garner. The house is now known as the Briscoe-Garner Museum, and also known as the Ettie R. Garner Memorial Building.

The structure is a two-story, H-shaped, hip-roofed, brick house with white trim around doors and windows, and brown shingles on the roof. It was built to plans by Atlee B. Ayres, at the time the most prominent architect in San Antonio, if not the state. The building housed the community library until about 1973. It then became a museum, using the first floor for displays documenting Garner's life and career.

The main house and cottage were designated a National Historic Landmark and listed on the National Register of Historic Places on December 8, 1976.

On November 20, 1999, the City of Uvalde transferred ownership of the Garner Home and Museum to the University of Texas at Austin, whereupon it became a division of the Dolph Briscoe Center for American History. In 2011, the University closed the house to the public for renovations. The displays were moved to the First State Bank of Uvalde main branch lobby. The first floor is still be devoted to Garner while the second floor features exhibits dedicated to Dolph Briscoe, the 41st Governor of Texas and also a Uvalde native.

== See also ==
- National Register of Historic Places listings in Uvalde County, Texas
- List of National Historic Landmarks in Texas
- Recorded Texas Historic Landmarks in Uvalde County
