= Wilhelm Thielepape =

American architect (1814–1904)

Wilhelm Carl August Thielepape
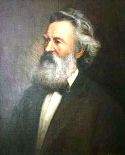

134th Mayor of San Antonio
- In office 1867–1872
- Preceded by: J. H. Lyons
- Succeeded by: S. G. Newton

Personal details
- Born: July 10, 1814 Wabern, Electorate of Hesse
- Died: August 7, 1904 (aged 90) Chicago, Illinois, U.S.
- Occupation: Lithographer; Photographer; Surveyor; Architect; Attorney
- Known for: 1867–1872 Mayor; San Antonio, Texas

Wilhelm Carl August Thielepape (July 10, 1814 – August 7, 1904), was an architect, engineer, teacher, photographer, and lithographer. He was mayor of San Antonio, Texas, during part of the Reconstruction era, and later an attorney in Chicago, Illinois.

== Early years ==
Wilhelm Thielepape was born July 10, 1814, in Wabern, Hesse, Germany, to Werner Philipp and Elisabeth (Thompson) Thielepape. He married Mathilde Gössling in 1841.

After graduation from a gymnasium in Kassel, he attended various universities during the 1840s.

== Texas ==
=== Arrival with Prince Carl of Solms-Braunfels ===
Thielepape arrived in Texas in 1844, with the first Adelsverein colony accompanying Prince Carl of Solms-Braunfels from Germany. After participating in a tour of the eastern and central United States in 1850, Thielepape settled in Carlshafen (Indianola), Texas, as a surveyor.

=== Uvalde County and Comal County ===
On May 2, 1855, Reading Wood Black hired Thielepape, to plat and lay out Encina, the town later known as Uvalde, Texas. For a short time, Thielepape lived in Comal County where he designed the 1860 courthouse.

=== San Antonio ===
Thielepape moved to San Antonio in 1854.

On April 2, 1858, he was among the organizers of the San Antonio's German-English School.

In 1857, Thielepape designed the Casino Club on Market Street, which opened in 1858. The club had its beginnings as a social gathering in 1854 in the home of Carl Hummel. When the club was chartered in 1857, its membership consisted of 106 German Texan men. The Market Street location hosted family entertainment, balls, social gatherings, music, activities, lectures and plays. Thielepape was a tenor who also founded the Beethoven Männerchor (men's choir) on February 23, 1867, to preserve German song, music, and language. He conducted the Beethoven Männerchor at the Casino.

Wilhelm Thielepape was among those who raised the Union flag over the Alamo on July 21, 1865, and who also passed out wine and songbooks in celebration of the Union victory. The four-month delay between the end of the Civil War in April and this celebration is not long in light of the 2 1/2 years between the Emancipation Proclamation and the news of it being delivered in Galveston, a date now denoted as the Juneteenth US national holiday.

Thielepape was appointed Reconstruction Mayor of San Antonio on November 8, 1867. In his tenure as mayor, Thielepape's administration built bridges, laid macadam streets, and strengthened the public schools. On March 12, 1872, Thielepape was removed from office and succeeded by Francois P. Giraud, but he remained active in the community.

In April 1874, Thielepape turned the Beethoven Männerchor over to Andreas Scheidemantel.

== Chicago and later years ==
Thielepape then moved to Chicago to participate in the building boom that followed the Great Chicago Fire. By 1887, he was an attorney with the Germania Life Insurance Company in Chicago. He died in Chicago on August 7, 1904.

== See also ==
- List of mayors of San Antonio
