= Knippa Independent School District =

School district in Texas, United States

Knippa Independent School District is a public school district based in the community of Knippa, Texas, United States.

The district has one school that serves students in prekindergarten through grade 12. The school mascot is a Rockcrusher.

In 2009, the school district was rated "recognized" by the Texas Education Agency.
