= Uvalde County, Texas =

County in Texas, United States

- County
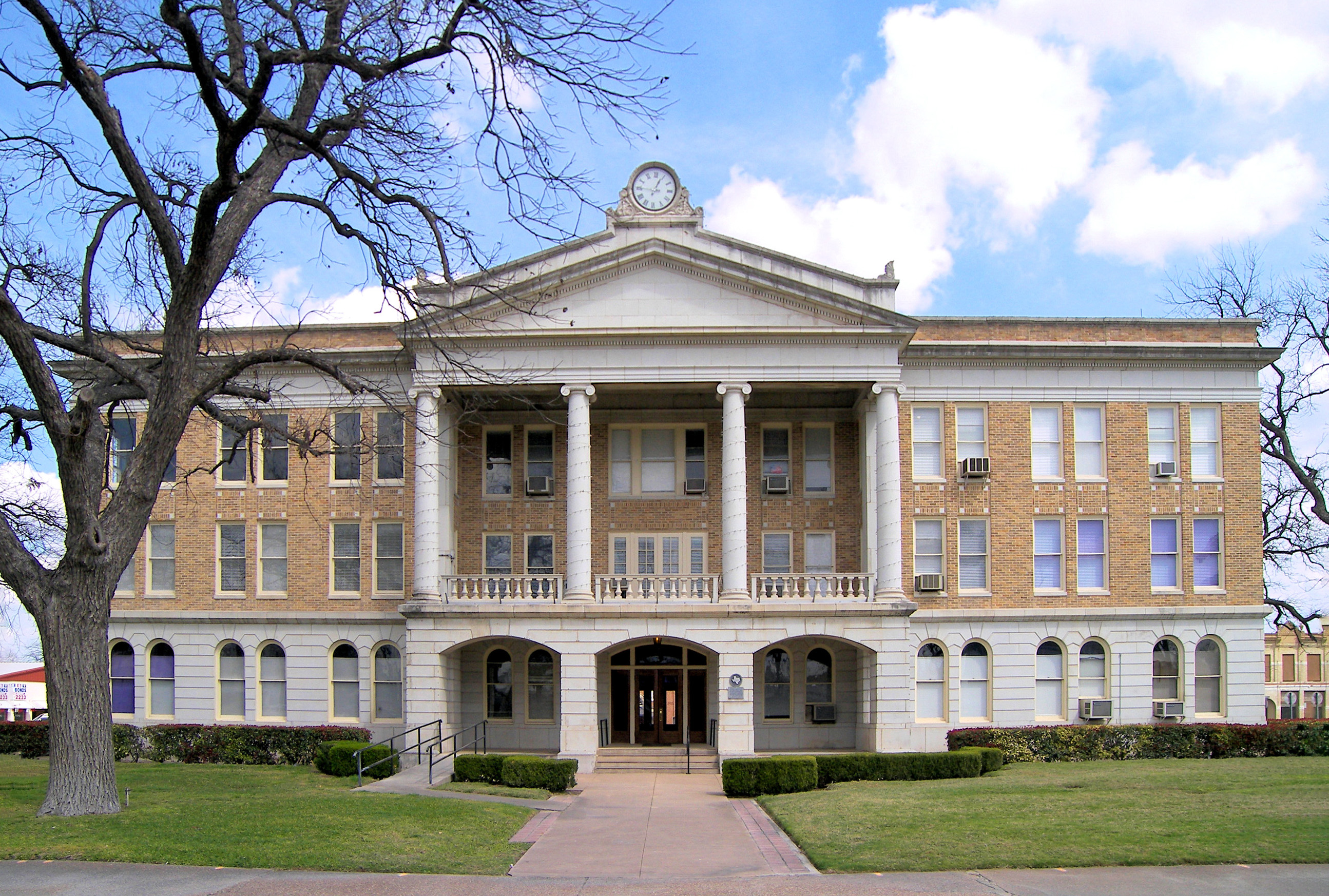
- The Uvalde County Courthouse was built in 1928 in neoclassical design. It is the fifth structure used as the county courthouse, having replaced the previous building constructed in 1890.

- Location within the U.S. state of Texas
- Coordinates: 29°21′N 99°46′W
- Country: United States
- State: Texas
- Founded: 1850 (created); 1856 (organized)
- Named for: Juan de Ugalde
- Seat: Uvalde
- Largest city: Uvalde

Area
  - Total: 1,559 sq mi (4,040 km^{2})
  - Land: 1,552 sq mi (4,020 km^{2})
  - Water: 6.7 sq mi (17 km^{2}) 0.4%

Population (2020)
  - Total: 24,564
  - Estimate (2025): 24,963 ▲
  - Density: 15.83/sq mi (6.111/km^{2})
- Time zone: UTC−6 (Central)
  - Summer (DST): UTC−5 (CDT)
- Congressional district: 23rd
- Website: www.uvaldecounty.gov

Uvalde County (/juːˈvældi/ yoo-VAL-dee; Spanish: Condado de Uvalde) is a county located in the U.S. state of Texas. As of the 2020 census, its population was 24,564. Its county seat is Uvalde. The county was created in 1850 and organized in 1856. It is named for Juan de Ugalde, the Spanish governor of Coahuila. Uvalde County was founded by Reading Wood Black, who also founded the city of Uvalde, Texas. Uvalde County comprises the Uvalde, Texas micropolitan statistical area.

== History ==
=== Native Americans ===
Artifacts establish human habitation dating back to 7000 BC. Evidence of a permanent Indian village on the Leona River at a place south of the Fort Inge site is indicated in the written accounts of Fernando del Bosque's exploration in 1675. Comanche, Tonkawa, Seminole, and Lipan Apache continued hunting and raiding settlers into the 19th century.

=== Early explorations ===
On January 9, 1790, Juan de Ugalde, governor of Coahuila and commandant of the Provincias Internas, led 600 men to a decisive victory over the Apaches near the site of modern Utopia at a place known then as Arroyo de la Soledad. In honor of his victory, the canyon area was thereafter called Cañon de Ugalde. French botanist Jean-Louis Berlandier visited the area in the late 1820s. James Bowie guided a group of silver prospectors into the area of north central Uvalde County in the 1830s. A trail used by General Adrián Woll's Mexican Army on its way to attack San Antonio in 1842 crossed the territory of Uvalde County and became the main highway to San Antonio.

=== Early settlements ===
Fort Inge was established in 1849 to repress Indian depredations on the international border with Mexico, and was served by the Overland Southern Mail.

One of the first settlers to the environs was William Washington Arnett, who arrived in the winter of 1852. The Canyon de Ugalde Land Company, formed by land speculators in San Antonio in 1837, began purchasing headright grants in Uvalde County in the late 1830s. Reading Wood Black, who with a partner, Nathan L. Stratton, purchased an undivided league and labor on the Leona River in 1853 at the future site of Uvalde. May 2, 1855, Black hired San Antonio lithographer Wilhelm Carl August Thielepape, and laid out Encina, the town later known as Uvalde. Waresville settlement by Capt. William Ware in the upper Sabinal Canyon and Patterson Settlement by George W. Patterson, John Leakey, and A. B. Dillard on the Sabinal River coincided with Reading Black's development of the Leona River at Encina.

=== County established and growth ===
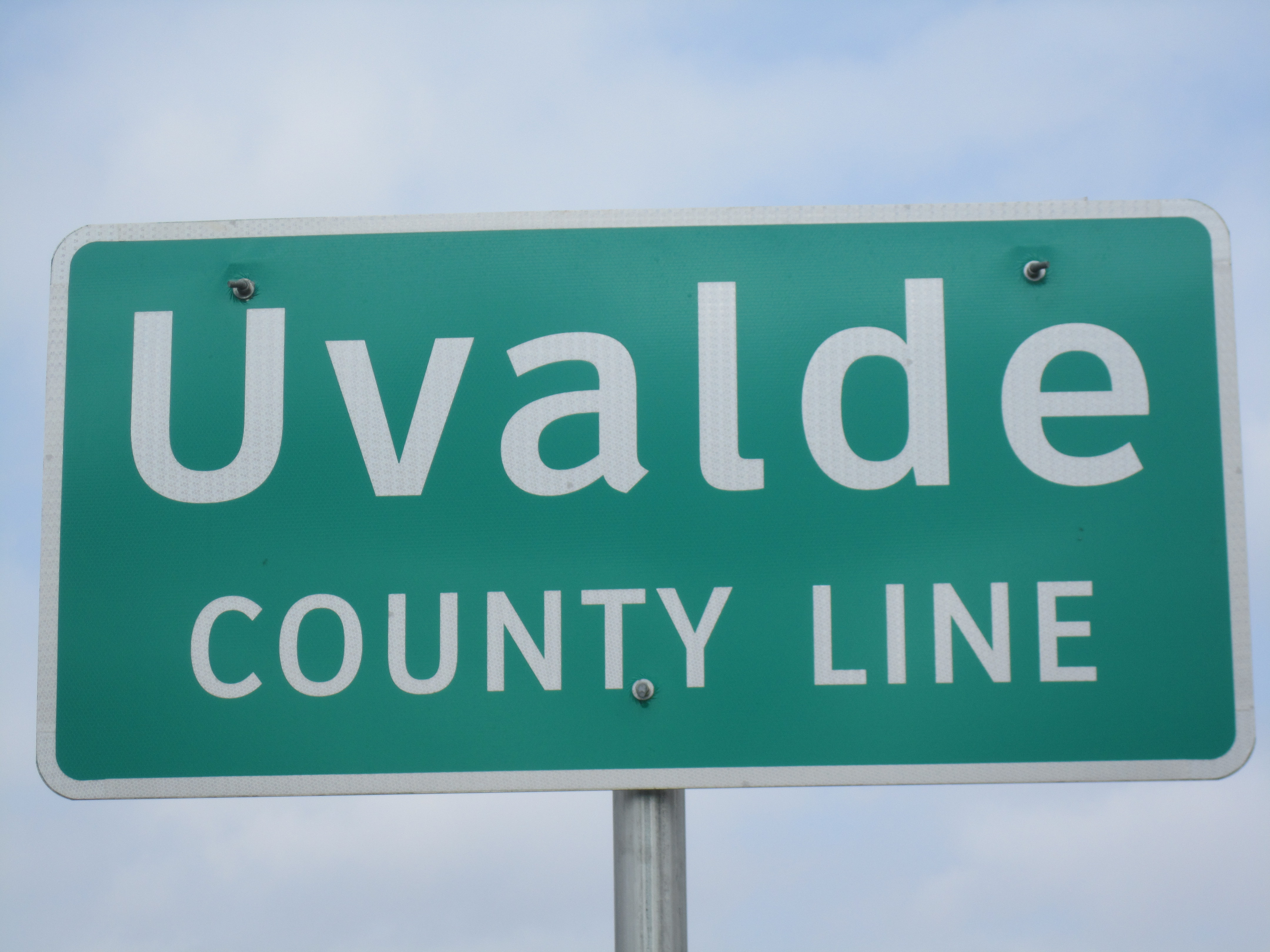
Uvalde County marker

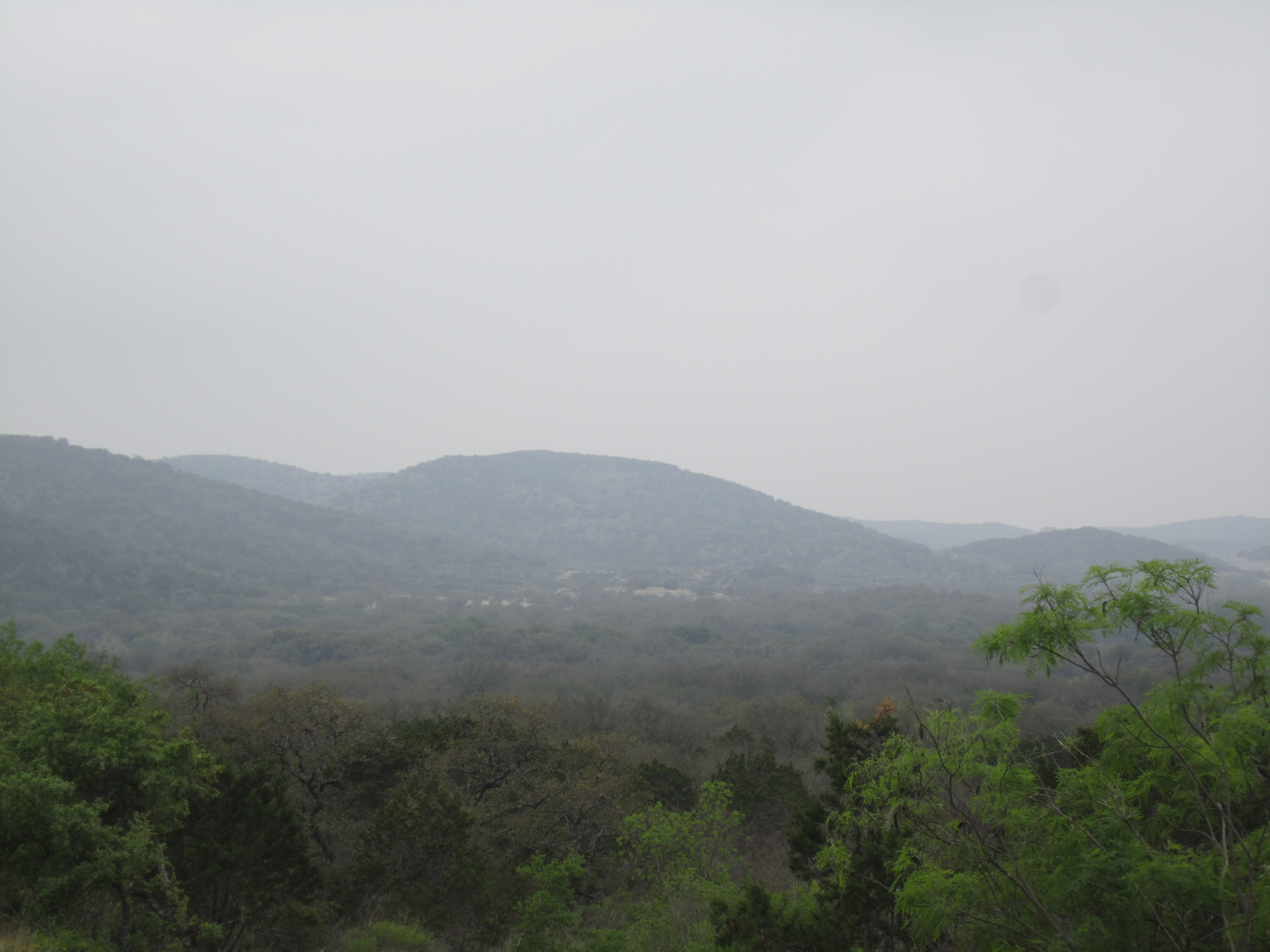
A scene of the Texas Hill Country in northern Uvalde County

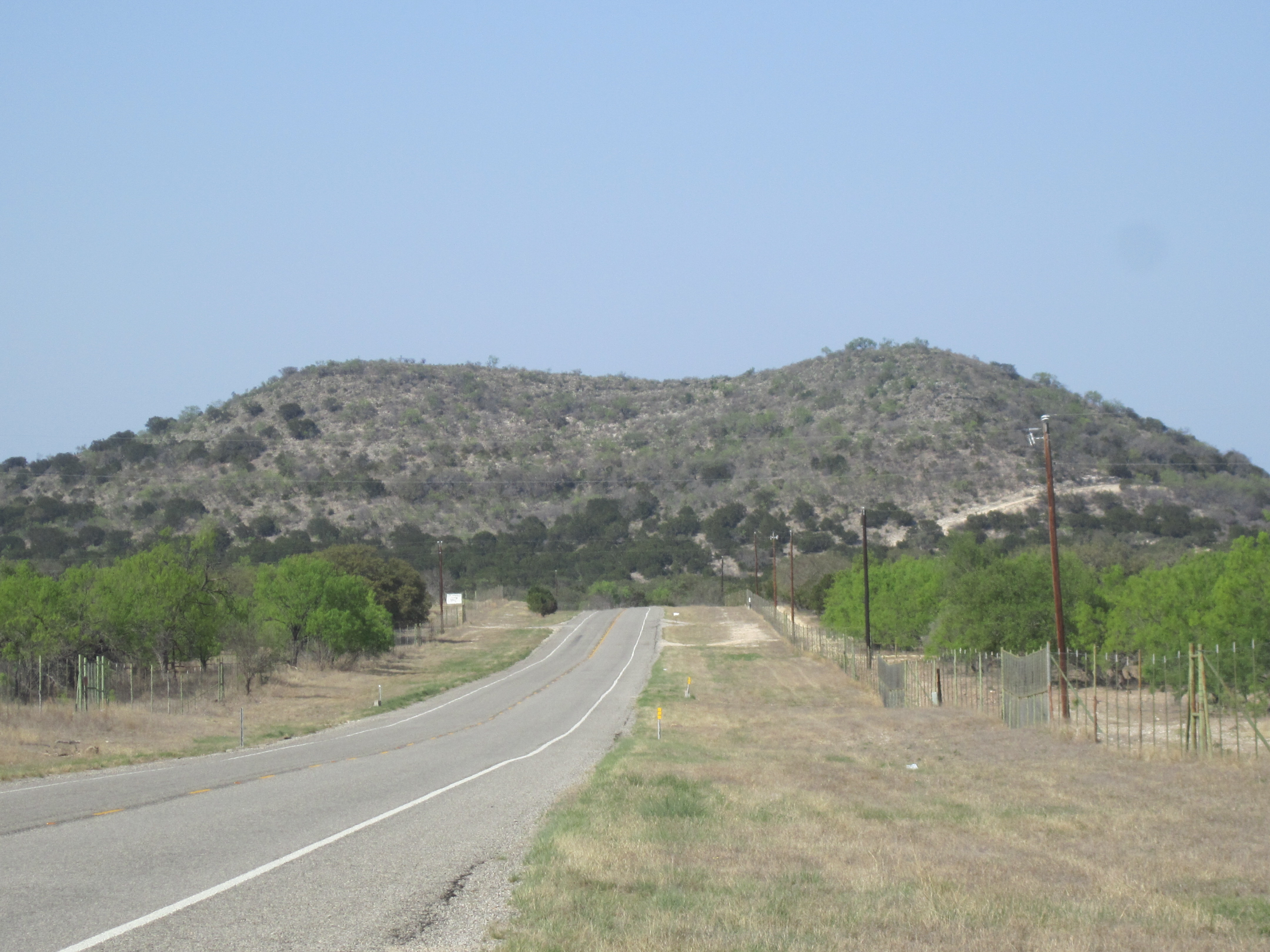
Texas State Highway 55 as it meanders through scenic northwestern Uvalde County near the Nueces River

In November 1855, Reading Wood Black successfully lobbied the Texas Legislature to organize Uvalde County. On May 12, the county was formally organized. On June 14, Encina was named county seat. The second floor of the courthouse was made into a school, and six school districts were organized for the county in 1858. The San Antonio-El Paso Mail route was extended along the county's main road with a stop at Fort Inge in 1857.

Conflict between Mexicans and Anglos during and after the Mexican War continued in Uvalde County, with the reported lynching of eleven Mexicans near the Nueces River in 1855. Laws passed in 1857 prohibited Mexicans from traveling through the county.

Residents of Uvalde County voted 76–16 against secession from the Union. The abandonment of Fort Inge immediately after secession was followed by renewed Indian attacks. Many men in Uvalde County fought for the Confederacy, while some Unionists fled to Mexico to avoid persecution.

Uvalde County endured three decades of unrelenting lawlessness after the Civil War. Violence, lawlessness, and Confederate-Union conflicts among citizens were so pervasive that armed guards were employed to assist the county tax assessor and collector, and the county had no sheriff for nearly two years. The years immediately following the Civil War were marked by conflicts between Confederates and Unionists returning to live in Uvalde County. Smugglers, cattle rustlers and horse rustlers, and numerous other desperadoes saturated the area, including notorious cattle rustler, J. King Fisher, who was appointed Uvalde sheriff in 1881. Willis Newton of the Newton Gang robbed his first train near Uvalde. Jess and Joe Newton retired to Uvalde.

The Uvalde Umpire began publication in 1878 and the Hesparian in 1879.

The Galveston, Harrisburg, and San Antonio Railway was built through the county, passing through Sabinal and Uvalde City, in 1881.

William M. Landrum introduced Angora goats to the area in the 1880s. By the turn of the century, goats outnumbered cattle.

Old West lawman Pat Garrett lived in the county from 1891 to 1900.

By 1905, the Southern Pacific Railroad had established railheads in Uvalde, Knippa, and Sabinal.

The local bee industry developed a product that received first place in the 1900 Paris World's Fair.

Garner State Park built by the Civilian Conservation Corps and opened in 1941. Garner Army Air Field the same year.

The National Fish Hatchery, established in 1935, originally focused on raising species such as catfish, largemouth bass, and sunfish.

In January 1989, Uvalde County withdrew from the Edwards Underground Water District.

In 1990, Uvalde County had a population of 23,340, with 60% identified as Hispanic.

=== Desegregation ===
From the Mexican Revolution in 1910, immigrant labor force cleared large tracts of land and dug ditches as irrigation spread throughout the county. The Uvalde and Northern Railway to Camp Wood, the Asphalt Beltway Railway in 1921, and the expansion of the asphalt mines in far southwestern Uvalde County at Blewett and Dabney were completed with the help of Mexican labor. By 1960, Mexican Americans made up one-half of Uvalde County's 16,015 population. Seasonal migrant workers continued to move to Uvalde and Sabinal during the 1960s.

The Alien Land Laws of 1891, 1892, and 1921 prohibited ownership of Texas land by noncitizen residents. The laws were repealed in 1965 by the Fifty-ninth Texas Legislature. These and other discriminatory deed restrictions had limited Tejanos in the purchase of town lots in the county.

Efforts to gain civil rights for Hispanics in Uvalde County began with the establishment of the Tomas Valle Post of the American Legion. County churches maintained segregated places of worship until an integrated Catholic church emerged in Uvalde in 1965.

The Mexican American Youth Organization formed in Uvalde City in 1968 and eventually led to a six-week walkout by more than 600 Mexican-American students an on April 14, 1970. The Texas Rangers and the Texas Department of Public Safety responded to requests by the school board to help control the volatile situation. Senator Walter F. Mondale, chairman of the United States Senate Committee on Equal Educational Opportunity, went to Uvalde on July 30, 1970, and criticized city officials in an interview published in the Uvalde Leader News.

A 1970 class-action lawsuit was filed by Genoveva Morales on behalf of her children against the Uvalde Consolidated Independent School District (CISD).

In 1975, the United States Court of Appeals for the Fifth Circuit found that Uvalde CISD in Texas had failed to desegregate its school system in violation of the Fourteenth Amendment to the United States Constitution and Title VI of the Civil Rights Act of 1964. In 1976, the Court ordered Uvalde CISD to comply. In 2007, Uvalde CISD sought to dismiss the desegregation order. The Mexican American Legal Defense and Education Fund opposed. On September 15, 2008, a settlement was reached.

=== 2017 church bus crash ===
On March 29, 2017, 13 senior citizens from the First Baptist Church of New Braunfels in Comal County, who had completed a retreat at Alto Frio Baptist Encampment near Leakey in Real County, were killed when Jack D. Young, the 20-year-old driver of a pickup, crashed into the church minivan on U.S. Highway 83 in Uvalde County near Garner State Park. One person survived the crash in critical condition. The collision was one of the deadliest in memory in Uvalde County.

Young, who worked on his father's ranch and at a golf course and had no criminal record, told a witness, "I'm sorry, I'm sorry," and said that he had been on his cell phone at the time of the crash. Jody Kuchler, a welder from Leakey who saw the accident, said that the driver of the church vehicle moved over to try to avoid Young's incoming pickup, but was blocked by the presence of a guard rail.

=== 2022 school shooting ===
On May 24, 2022, 19 children and two teachers were killed in a school shooting in Uvalde. The shooter, Salvador Rolando Ramos, had shot his grandmother before driving to Robb Elementary School, where he entered the building without opposition. Local officers, believing the shooter to be barricaded safely inside the school, stood outside waiting for further instruction. Video shows local officers forcing parents behind police tape, pinning them down, and threatening to tase them, preventing them from trying to save their children's lives. After an hour, the killer was shot by BORTAC agents.

== Geography ==
According to the United States Census Bureau, the county has a total area of 1,559 square miles (4,040 km^{2}), of which 6.7 square miles (17 km^{2}) (0.4%) are covered by water.

=== Major highways ===
- U.S. Highway 83
- U.S. Highway 90
- State Highway 55
- State Highway 127
- Spur 144
- Spur 155

=== Adjacent counties ===
- Real County (north)
- Bandera County (northeast)
- Medina County (east)
- Frio County (southeast)
- Zavala County (south)
- Maverick County (southwest)
- Kinney County (west)
- Edwards County (northwest)

== Demographics ==
Historical population
Census	Pop.	Note	%±
1860	506		—
1870	851		68.2%
1880	2,541		198.6%
1890	3,804		49.7%
1900	4,647		22.2%
1910	11,233		141.7%
1920	10,769		−4.1%
1930	12,945		20.2%
1940	13,246		2.3%
1950	16,015		20.9%
1960	16,814		5.0%
1970	17,348		3.2%
1980	22,441		29.4%
1990	23,340		4.0%
2000	25,926		11.1%
2010	26,405		1.8%
2020	24,564		−7.0%
2025 (est.)	24,963	▲	1.6%
U.S. Decennial Census; 1850–2010 2010–2020

=== Racial and ethnic composition ===
Uvalde County, Texas – Racial and ethnic composition Note: the US Census treats Hispanic/Latino as an ethnic category. This table excludes Latinos from the racial categories and assigns them to a separate category. Hispanics/Latinos may be of any race.
Race / Ethnicity (NH = Non-Hispanic)	Pop 1980	Pop 1990	Pop 2000	Pop 2010	Pop 2020	% 1980	% 1990	% 2000	% 2010	% 2020
White alone (NH)	9,876	9,030	8,471	7,666	6,613	44.01%	38.69%	32.67%	29.03%	26.92%
Black or African American alone (NH)	69	35	66	110	107	0.31%	0.15%	0.25%	0.42%	0.44%
Native American or Alaska Native alone (NH)	28	28	58	62	25	0.12%	0.12%	0.22%	0.23%	0.10%
Asian alone (NH)	27	53	87	116	158	0.12%	0.23%	0.34%	0.44%	0.64%
Native Hawaiian or Pacific Islander alone (NH)	x	x	2	6	6	x	x	0.01%	0.02%	0.02%
Other race alone (NH)	47	90	11	35	66	0.21%	0.39%	0.04%	0.13%	0.27%
Mixed race or Multiracial (NH)	x	x	142	111	272	x	x	0.55%	0.42%	1.11%
Hispanic or Latino (any race)	12,394	14,104	17,089	18,299	17,317	55.23%	60.43%	65.91%	69.30%	70.50%
Total	22,441	23,340	25,926	26,405	24,564	100.00%	100.00%	100.00%	100.00%	100.00%

=== 2020 census ===
As of the 2020 census, there were 24,564 people, 8,624 households, and 6,206 families residing in the county. The median age was 37.3 years, with 24.8% of residents under the age of 18 and 18.2% aged 65 years or older. For every 100 females there were 97.2 males, and for every 100 females age 18 and over there were 94.8 males age 18 and over.

The racial makeup of the county was 51.2% White, 0.6% Black or African American, 0.5% American Indian and Alaska Native, 0.7% Asian, <0.1% Native Hawaiian and Pacific Islander, 16.3% from some other race, and 30.6% from two or more races. Hispanic or Latino residents of any race comprised 70.5% of the population.

64.8% of residents lived in urban areas, while 35.2% lived in rural areas.

There were 8,624 households in the county, of which 35.3% had children under the age of 18 living in them. Of all households, 48.7% were married-couple households, 16.8% were households with a male householder and no spouse or partner present, and 27.7% were households with a female householder and no spouse or partner present. About 23.5% of all households were made up of individuals and 11.0% had someone living alone who was 65 years of age or older.

There were 10,034 housing units, of which 14.1% were vacant. Among occupied housing units, 69.5% were owner-occupied and 30.5% were renter-occupied. The homeowner vacancy rate was 1.3% and the rental vacancy rate was 11.9%.

=== 2000 census ===
As of the census of 2000, there were 25,926 people, 8,559 households, and 6,641 families residing in the county. The population density was 17 people per square mile (6.6 people/km^{2}). There were 10,166 housing units at an average density of 6 units per square mile (2.3 units/km^{2}). The racial makeup of the county was 75.68% White, 0.36% Black or African American, 0.68% Native American, 0.39% Asian, 0.08% Pacific Islander, 19.65% from other races, and 3.16% from two or more races. 65.91% of the population were Hispanic or Latino of any race.

There were 8,559 households, out of which 40.2% had children under the age of 18 living with them, 59.4% were married couples living together, 13.7% had a female householder with no husband present, and 22.4% were non-families. 19.9% of all households were made up of individuals, and 9.8% had someone living alone who was 65 years of age or older. The average household size was 2.96 and the average family size was 3.42.

In the county, the population was spread out, with 31.4% under the age of 18, 9.80% from 18 to 24, 25.3% from 25 to 44, 20% from 45 to 64, and 13.6% who were 65 years of age or older. The median age was 32 years. For every 100 females there were 95.00 males. For every 100 females age 18 and over, there were 90.70 males.

The median income for a household in the county was $27,164, and the median income for a family was $30,671. Males had a median income of $25,135 versus $16,486 for females. The per capita income for the county was $12,557. About 19.90% of families and 24.3% of the population were below the poverty line, including 33.9% of those under age 18 and 18.6% of those age 65 or over.

== Communities ==
=== Cities ===
- Sabinal
- Uvalde (county seat)

=== Census-designated places ===
- Knippa
- Utopia
- Uvalde Estates

=== Unincorporated community ===
- Concan

== Politics ==
In contrast to the rest of heavily Hispanic South Texas, Uvalde County is typically a Republican stronghold. The last Democrat to win it on the presidential level was Lyndon Johnson in 1964.

United States presidential election results for Uvalde County, Texas
Year	Republican		Democratic		Third party(ies)	
Year	No.	%	No.	%	No.	%
1912	53	6.85%	601	77.65%	120	15.50%
1916	92	11.03%	728	87.29%	14	1.68%
1920	237	23.21%	743	72.77%	41	4.02%
1924	351	20.47%	1,312	76.50%	52	3.03%
1928	1,224	62.10%	747	37.90%	0	0.00%
1932	422	19.30%	1,759	80.47%	5	0.23%
1936	354	16.87%	1,743	83.08%	1	0.05%
1940	556	22.85%	1,871	76.90%	6	0.25%
1944	856	36.33%	1,322	56.11%	178	7.56%
1948	866	34.03%	1,550	60.90%	129	5.07%
1952	2,805	69.36%	1,230	30.42%	9	0.22%
1956	2,449	70.72%	994	28.70%	20	0.58%
1960	2,214	62.33%	1,324	37.27%	14	0.39%
1964	1,963	45.38%	2,358	54.51%	5	0.12%
1968	2,252	47.32%	1,736	36.48%	771	16.20%
1972	3,883	72.89%	1,438	26.99%	6	0.11%
1976	3,103	56.95%	2,299	42.19%	47	0.86%
1980	3,887	61.06%	2,402	37.73%	77	1.21%
1984	4,790	65.73%	2,482	34.06%	15	0.21%
1988	4,266	53.32%	3,684	46.04%	51	0.64%
1992	3,635	42.55%	3,482	40.76%	1,426	16.69%
1996	3,494	47.65%	3,397	46.32%	442	6.03%
2000	4,855	57.66%	3,436	40.81%	129	1.53%
2004	5,148	60.69%	3,298	38.88%	37	0.44%
2008	4,590	52.36%	4,126	47.07%	50	0.57%
2012	4,529	53.69%	3,825	45.35%	81	0.96%
2016	4,835	53.94%	3,867	43.14%	262	2.92%
2020	6,174	59.69%	4,073	39.38%	97	0.94%
2024	6,482	66.33%	3,218	32.93%	72	0.74%

United States Senate election results for Uvalde County, Texas1
Year	Republican		Democratic		Third party(ies)	
Year	No.	%	No.	%	No.	%
2024	5,848	60.80%	3,493	36.31%	278	2.89%

United States Senate election results for Uvalde County, Texas2
Year	Republican		Democratic		Third party(ies)	
Year	No.	%	No.	%	No.	%
2020	5,968	59.19%	3,821	37.90%	293	2.91%

Texas Gubernatorial election results for Uvalde County
Year	Republican		Democratic		Third party(ies)	
Year	No.	%	No.	%	No.	%
2022	4,779	60.14%	3,048	38.36%	119	1.50%

== Education ==
School districts within the county include:

- Knippa Independent School District
- Leakey Independent School District
- Nueces Canyon Consolidated Independent School District
- Sabinal Independent School District
- Utopia Independent School District
- Uvalde Consolidated Independent School District

Southwest Texas Junior College, the designated community college for the whole county under the Texas Education Code, has a campus next to Uvalde on the site of Garner Field. The Garner Field facility also houses a campus of Sul Ross State University.

== See also ==
- Reading Wood Black
- List of museums in South Texas
- National Register of Historic Places listings in Uvalde County, Texas
- Recorded Texas Historic Landmarks in Uvalde County
- Friedrich Armand Strubberg
