= Utopia Independent School District =

School district in Texas, United States

Utopia Independent School District is a public school district based in the community of Utopia, Texas, US.

Located in Uvalde County, the district extends into portions of Bandera, Real, and Medina counties.

Utopia ISD has one school - Utopia High School - that serves students in grades pre-kindergarten through twelve.

In 2009, the school district was rated "recognized" by the Texas Education Agency.
