= Leona River =

Coordinates: 28°44′17″N 99°8′45″W

Location
- Country: United States

Physical characteristics
- Source
  - location: Texas

The Leona River is a river in Texas. It runs through the counties of Uvalde, Zavala and Frio. Archeological discoveries related to indigenous peoples have been made in areas where the river has drained.

== See also ==
- List of rivers of Texas
