= Juan de Ugalde =

Mexican general (1729–1816)

Governor of Coahuila
- In office November 23, 1777 – April 17, 1783
- Preceded by: Jacobo de Ugarte y Loyola
- Succeeded by: Pedro Fueros

Personal details
- Born: Juan de Ugalde; December 9, 1729 Cádiz, Spain
- Died: 1816 (aged 86–87) Cádiz, Spain
- Parent(s): Miguel de Ugalde; Doña Catalina González

Juan de Ugalde (December 9, 1729 – 1816), sometimes referred to in later English-language sources as Juan de Uvalde by American settlers, was a Spanish military officer and colonial administrator who served in several important positions in New Spain during the late 18th and early 19th centuries. He served as governor of Coahuila, now in Mexico. and was later appointed commanding general of Texas, Coahuila, Nuevo León, and Nuevo Santander.

Ugalde was particularly noted for his military campaigns against Apache groups in the northern frontier of New Spain. His most celebrated military engagement occurred in 1790 at Arroyo de la Soledad, where Spanish forces under his command fought Apache forces. Following the campaign, the area became associated with his name and was known as Cañón de Ugalde. During the 19th century, American settlers increasingly rendered the name as Uvalde, eventually giving rise to the modern name of Uvalde, Texas.

Ugalde was born in Cádiz, Spain. On December 9, 1729, entered military service as a young man and spent much of his career in the Spanish Empire. His assignments eventually brought him to the northern frontier of New Spain, where he became involved in military operations, frontier administration, relations with Indigenous peoples, and efforts to protect Spanish settlements from raids and military incursions.

In 1787, Ugalde was appointed commanding general over a large region encompassing Texas, Coahuila, Nuevo León, and Nuevo Santander. The position gave him responsibility for one of the most strategically difficult areas of the Spanish Empire in North America.

After being ordered to return to Spain, Ugalde continued his military career. He was promoted to field marshal in 1797 and subsequently to lieutenant general in 1810. He died in Cádiz in 1816.
