= Uvalde, Texas =

Uvalde
- City
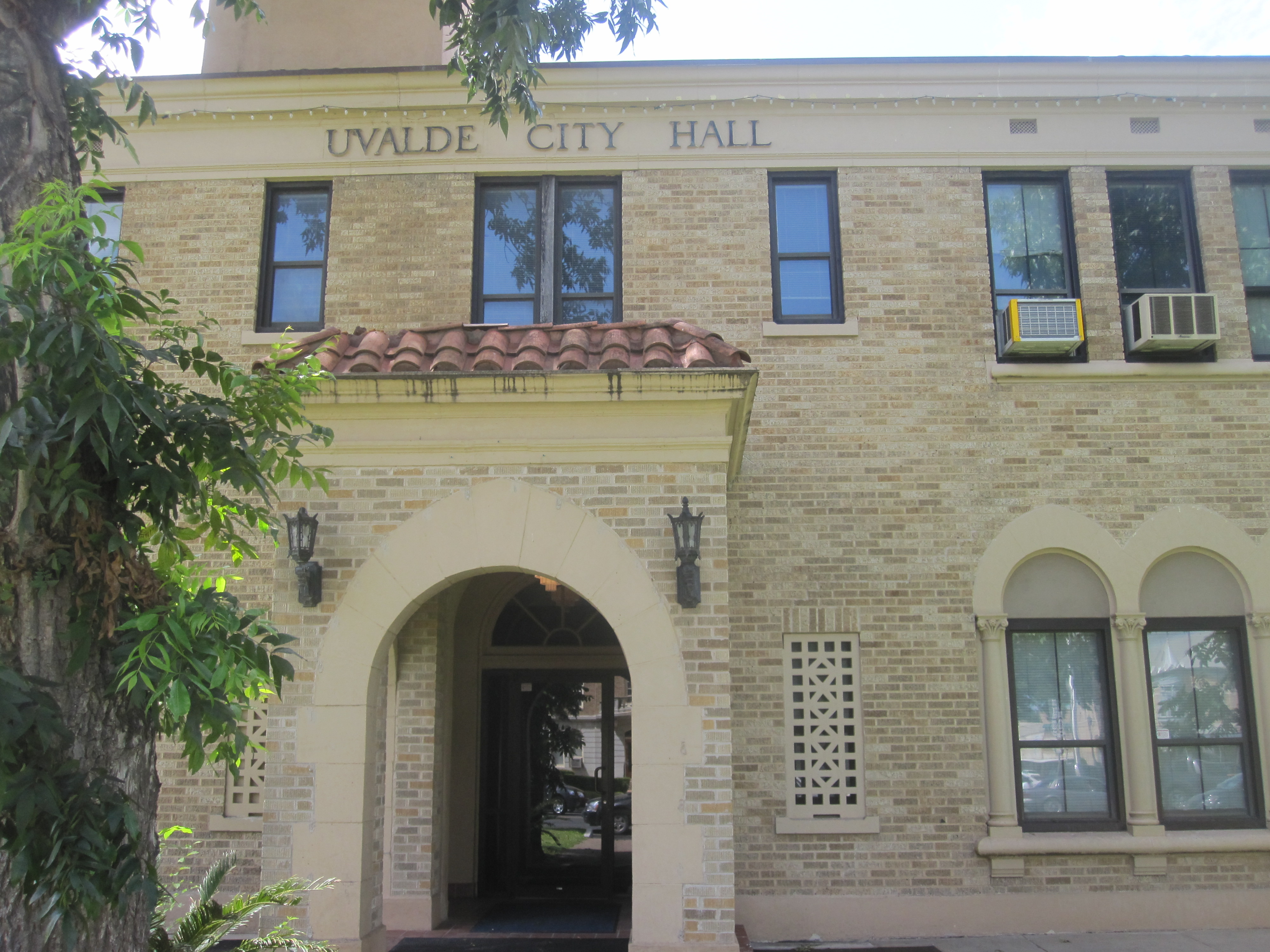
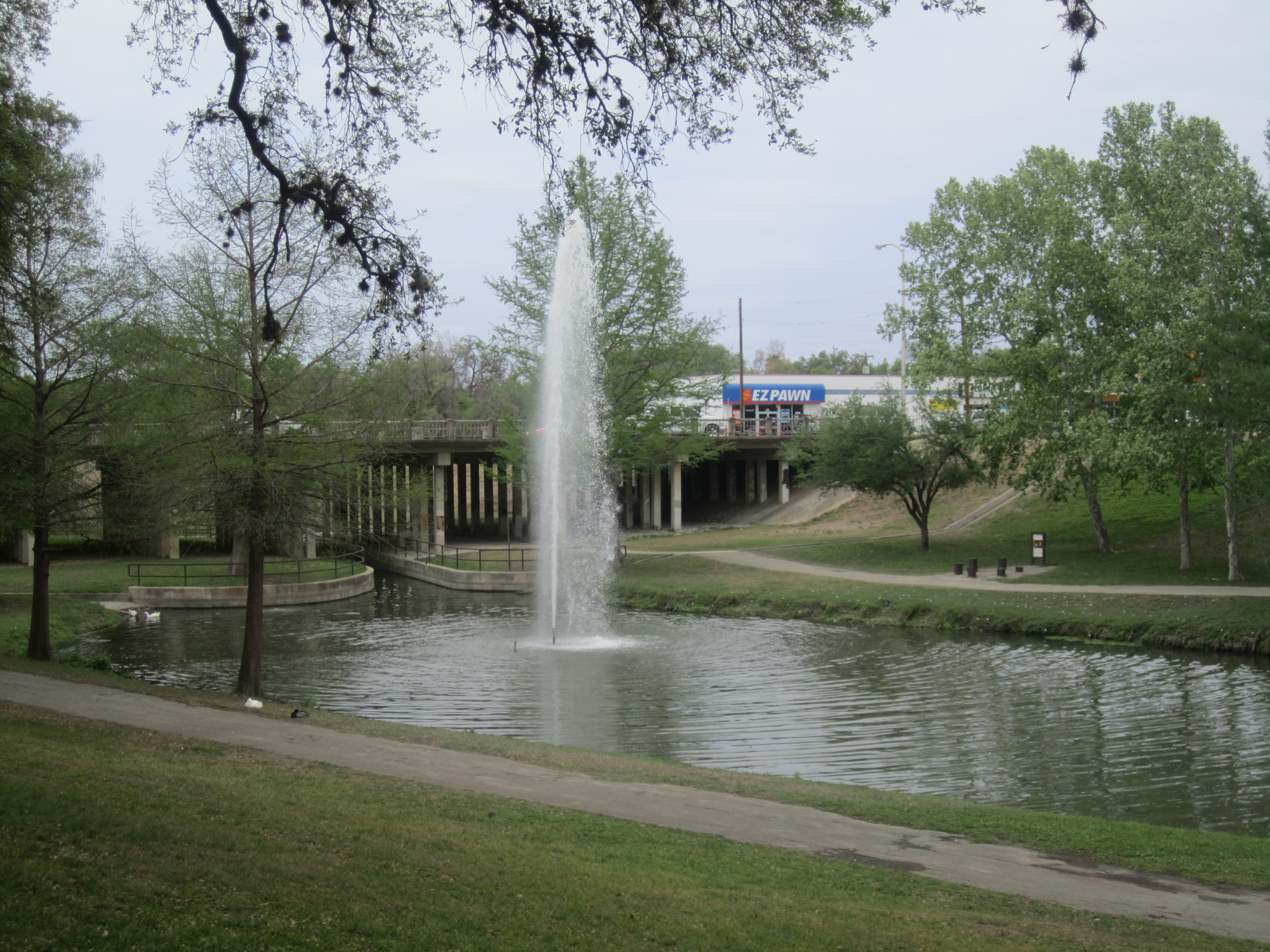
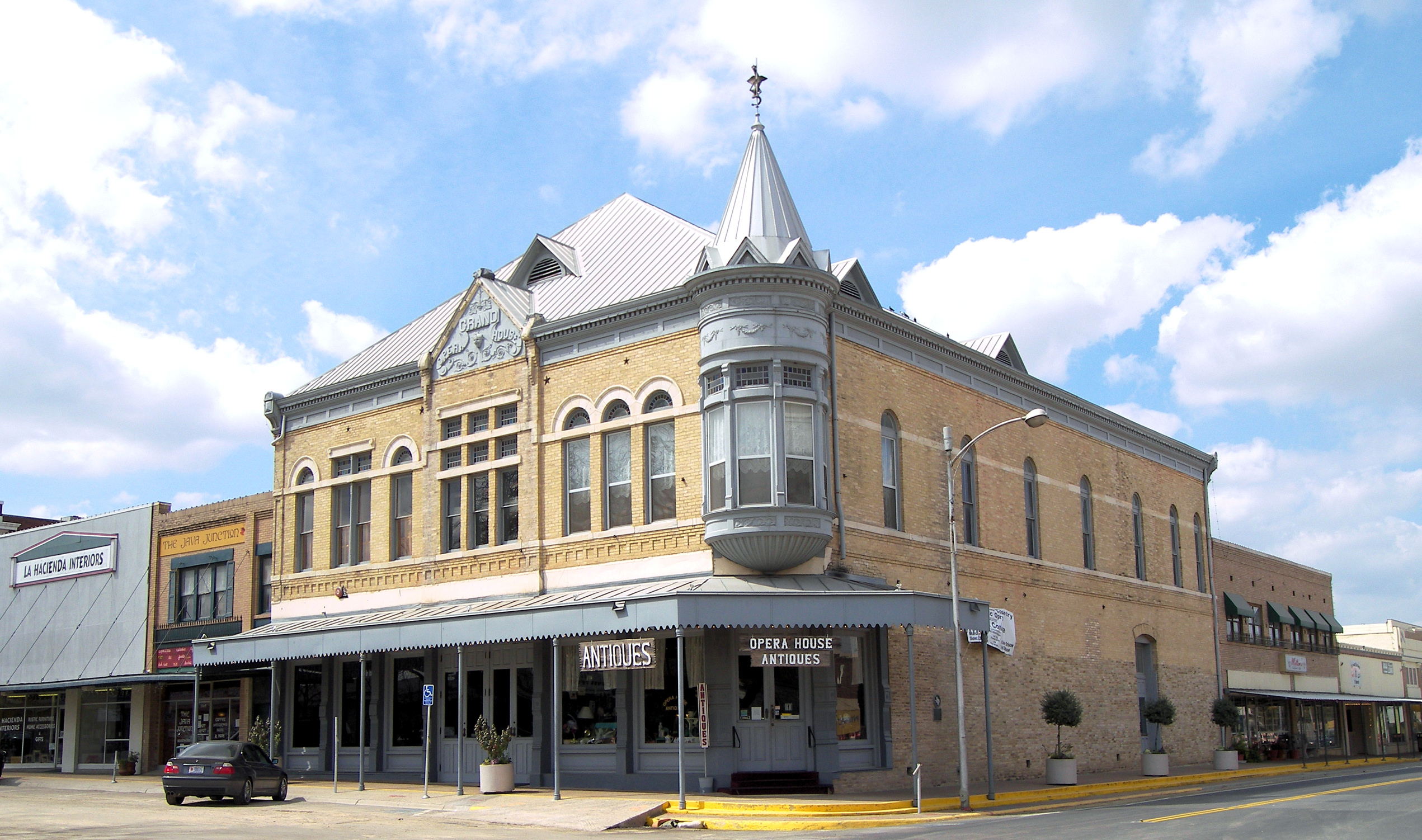
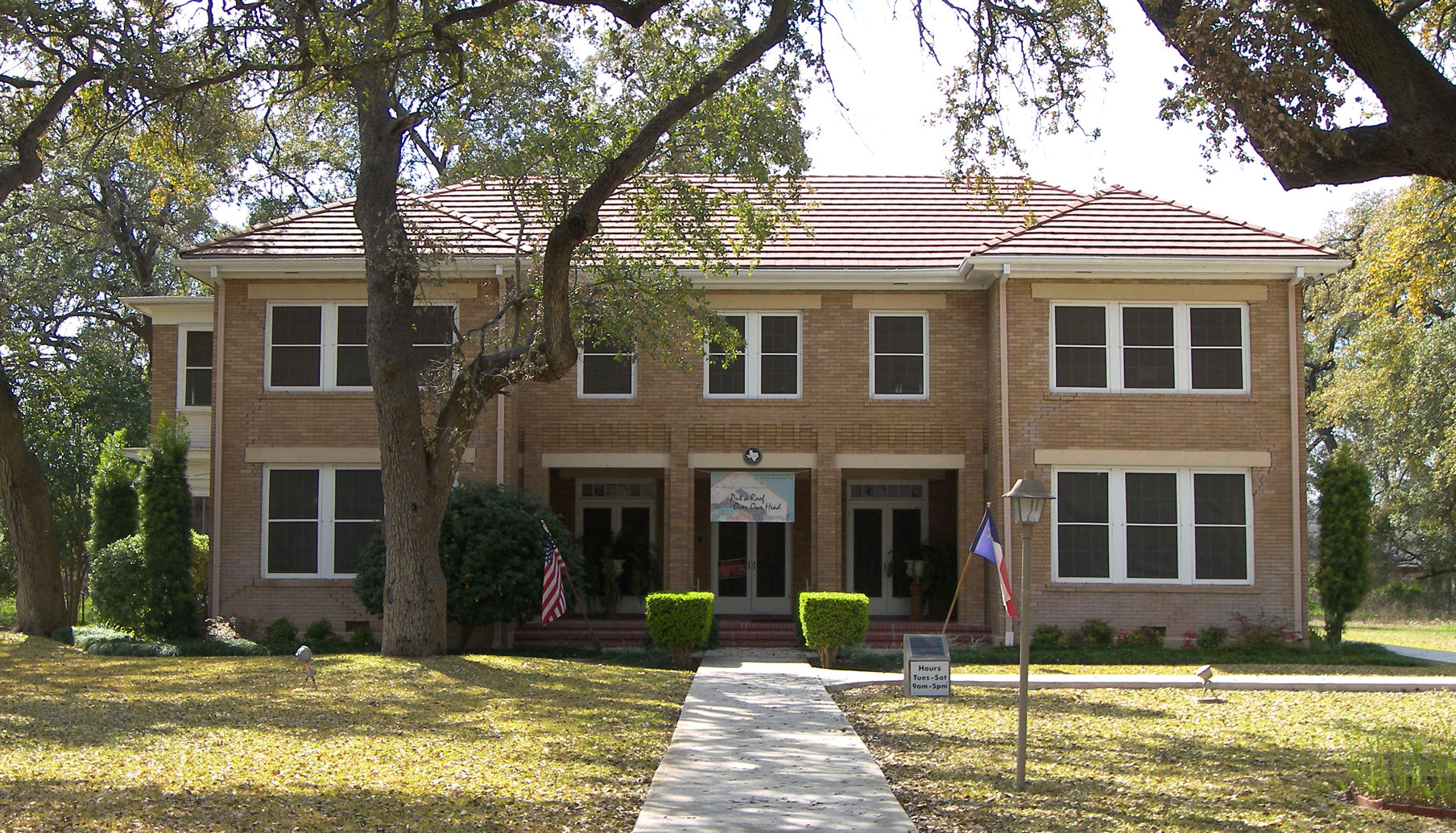
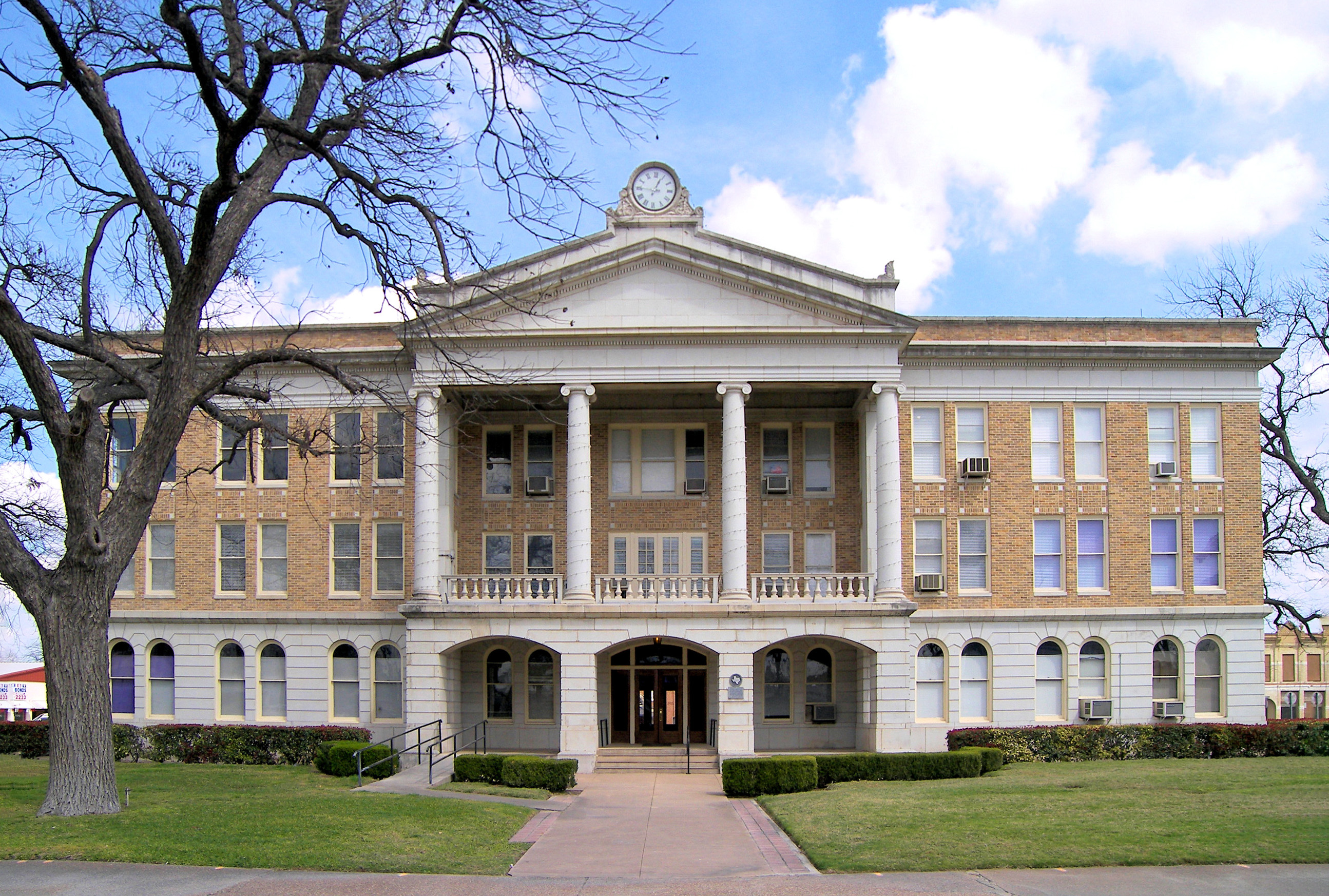
- Uvalde City Hall Fountain on the Leona River in Uvalde Memorial Park Janey Slaughter Briscoe Grand Opera House John Nance Garner House Uvalde County Courthouse

- Seal
- Nickname: City of Trees

- Location in Texas Uvalde (the United States)
- Coordinates: 29°12′55″N 99°46′41″W
- Country: United States
- State: Texas
- County: Uvalde
- Named for: Juan de Ugalde

Government
  - Type: Mayor–council
  - Mayor: Hector Luefano
  - City Council: Members: Ernest Santosh; Donald McLaughlin, III; Eloisa R. Medina; Con Mims; Ernest W. King III
  - City Manager: Vincent DiPiazza

Area
  - Total: 7.67 sq mi (19.87 km^{2})
  - Land: 7.66 sq mi (19.85 km^{2})
  - Water: 0.0077 sq mi (0.02 km^{2})
- Elevation: 906 ft (276 m)

Population (2020)
  - Total: 15,217
  - Estimate (2024): 15,589
  - Density: 1,985/sq mi (766.6/km^{2})
- Time zone: UTC−6 (CST)
  - Summer (DST): UTC−5 (CDT)
- ZIP Codes: 78801–78802
- Area code: 830
- FIPS code: 48-74588
- GNIS feature ID: 2412138
- Website: uvaldetx.gov

Uvalde (/juːˈvældi/ yoo-VAL-dee) is a city in and the county seat of Uvalde County, Texas, United States. The population was 15,217 at the 2020 census, down from 15,751 in 2010. It is the principal city in the Uvalde, Texas Micropolitan Statistical Area. Uvalde is located in the Texas Hill Country, 80 miles (130 km) west of downtown San Antonio and 54 miles (87 km) east of the Mexico–United States border. The city was founded in 1853 as Encina and renamed in 1856 after the Spanish governor Juan de Ugalde.

== Name ==
Uvalde was founded in 1853 as the town of Encina, but was renamed in 1856 as Uvalde. Its name is a misspelling of the Spanish governor Juan de Ugalde (Cádiz, Andalusia, 1729–1816). Ugalde is a name of Basque origin, meaning water-side or river.

Pronunciations of the name of the town vary. One common pronunciation is the fully Anglicized version (/juːˈvældi/ yoo-VAL-dee). A fully Spanish version is also in common use, which is often approximated by English speakers as /uːˈvɑːldɛ/ oo-VAHL-deh. There are also pronunciations that combine the English and Spanish versions. The chosen pronunciation often shows how strong a person's connection with the Hispanic community is or general knowledge of its pronunciation.

== History ==
=== Founding ===
Uvalde was founded by Reading Wood Black in 1853 as the town of Encina. In 1856, when the county was organized, the town was renamed Uvalde after Spanish governor Juan de Ugalde (Cádiz, Andalusia, 1729–1816) and was chosen as county seat. It is the southern limit of the Texas Hill Country and is part of South Texas. Uvalde is known for its production, dating back to the 1870s, of huajillo honey (also spelled guajillo), a mild, light-colored honey.

=== 1900s ===
In 1924, aviator Charles Lindbergh landed his Canadian-built version of the Curtiss JN Jenny biplane in the town square. He was misoriented and low on fuel. After refueling, he found he was unable to take off as he had landed. He maneuvered his aircraft onto a nearby street and attempted to take off. He hit an obstruction and struck a hardware store causing slight damage to both the building and his aircraft. He was able to leave after replacing the propeller.

One renowned resident of Uvalde was Franklin Roosevelt's first vice president who served from 1933 to 1941, John Nance Garner. Garner notably used his legislative experience and Congressional friendships to steer New Deal legislation through the U.S. Congress.

=== Robb Elementary shooting ===
The city received national attention when On May 24, 2022, 19 children and two adults were killed and 18 others wounded in the Robb Elementary School shooting. It is the deadliest school shooting and the third deadliest mass shooting in the state of Texas, and the third deadliest school shooting in US history.

== Government ==
Since January 2025, Hector Luevano has served as mayor of Uvalde.

== Geography ==
According to the United States Census Bureau, the city has a total area of 7.6 square miles (19.8 km^{2}), all land.

=== Transportation ===
Uvalde is located at the crossroads of U.S. Hwy 90 and U.S. Hwy 83. U.S. Route 90 runs east–west through the center of Uvalde as Main Street, leading west 39 miles (63 km) to Brackettville and east 22 miles (35 km) to Sabinal. U.S. Route 83 runs north–south through the center of Uvalde, following Milam Street on the north side of the city and a portion of S Getty Street on the south city of the city. It leads south 20 miles (32 km) south La Pryor and north 40 miles (64 km) to Leakey. Texas State Highway 55 runs northeast from Uvalde 39 miles (63 km) to Camp Wood and 69 miles (111 km) to Rocksprings.

The closest airport with commercial airline service is Del Rio International Airport, on the west side of Del Rio, 72 miles (116 km) from Uvalde to the west, and the closest commercial airline service hub is San Antonio International Airport, on the north side of San Antonio 88 miles (142 km) to the east.

=== Climate ===
The climate in this region is characterized by hot, humid summers and mild, dry winters. According to the Köppen climate classification system, Uvalde has a humid subtropical climate, Cfa (inclining toward Cwa), on climate maps.

== Demographics ==
Historical population
Census	Pop.	Note	%±
1880	794		—
1890	1,265		59.3%
1900	1,889		49.3%
1910	3,998		111.6%
1920	3,885		−2.8%
1930	5,286		36.1%
1940	6,679		26.4%
1950	8,674		29.9%
1960	10,293		18.7%
1970	10,764		4.6%
1980	14,178		31.7%
1990	14,729		3.9%
2000	14,929		1.4%
2010	15,751		5.5%
2020	15,217		−3.4%
2024 (est.)	15,589		2.4%
U.S. Decennial Census; Texas Almanac: 1850–2000; 1850–1900 1910; 1920 1930 1940; 1950 1960 1970; 1980 1990 2000; 2010 2020

The subsections below summarize data from past United States censuses.

=== Racial and ethnic composition ===
Uvalde city, Texas – Racial and ethnic composition Note: the US Census treats Hispanic/Latino as an ethnic category. This table excludes Latinos from the racial categories and assigns them to a separate category. Hispanics/Latinos may be of any race.
Race / Ethnicity (NH = Non-Hispanic)	Pop 2000	Pop 2010	Pop 2020	% 2000	% 2010	% 2020
White alone (NH)	3,470	3,125	2,917	23.24%	19.84%	19.17%
Black or African American alone (NH)	45	74	50	0.30%	0.47%	0.33%
Native American or Alaska Native alone (NH)	23	35	16	0.15%	0.22%	0.11%
Asian alone (NH)	60	96	125	0.40%	0.61%	0.82%
Native Hawaiian or Pacific Islander alone (NH)	2	1	3	0.01%	0.01%	0.02%
Other race alone (NH)	1	19	39	0.01%	0.12%	0.26%
Mixed race or Multiracial (NH)	60	55	128	0.40%	0.35%	0.84%
Hispanic or Latino (any race)	11,268	12,346	11,939	75.48%	78.38%	78.46%
Total	14,929	15,751	15,217	100.00%	100.00%	100.00%

=== 2020 census ===
As of the 2020 census, Uvalde had a population of 15,217 in 5,332 households, including 3,663 families. The median age was 35.7 years, 25.9% of residents were under the age of 18, and 16.9% of residents were 65 years of age or older. For every 100 females there were 94.4 males, and for every 100 females age 18 and over there were 92.3 males age 18 and over.

99.9% of residents lived in urban areas, while 0.1% lived in rural areas.

Of those households, 36.6% had children under the age of 18 living in them. Of all households, 44.1% were married-couple households, 16.7% were households with a male householder and no spouse or partner present, and 31.0% were households with a female householder and no spouse or partner present. About 24.7% of all households were made up of individuals and 10.8% had someone living alone who was 65 years of age or older.

There were 5,995 housing units, of which 11.1% were vacant. The homeowner vacancy rate was 1.4% and the rental vacancy rate was 11.9%.

Racial composition as of the 2020 census
Race	Number	Percent
White	7,054	46.4%
Black or African American	87	0.6%
American Indian and Alaska Native	71	0.5%
Asian	129	0.8%
Native Hawaiian and Other Pacific Islander	5	0.0%
Some other race	2,657	17.5%
Two or more races	5,214	34.3%

=== 2010 census ===
At the 2010 United States census, the population was 15,751.

=== 2000 census ===
As of the 2000 United States census, 14,929 people, 4,796 households and 3,716 families resided in the city. The population density was 2,220.2 inhabitants per square mile (857.2/km^{2}). The 5,313 housing units averaged 790.1 per square mile (305.3/km^{2}). The racial makeup of the city was 78.3% Hispanic or Latino, 19.2% White, 0.47% African American, 0.62% Native American, 0.48% Asian, 0.07% Pacific Islander, 0% from other races, and 2.97% from two or more races.

Of the 4,796 households, 41.8% had children under the age of 18 living with them, 55.6% were married couples living together, 16.9% had a female householder with no husband present, and 22.5% were not families; 20.1% of all households were made up of individuals, and 10.4% had someone living alone who was 65 years of age or older. The average household size was 3.02 and the average family size was 3.50.

About 32.4% of the population was under the age of 18, 9.6% from 18 to 24, 25.7% from 25 to 44, 18.3% from 45 to 64, and 14.0% was 65 years of age or older. The median age was 31 years. For every 100 females, there were 90.3 males. For every 100 females age 18 and over, there were 85.5 males.

The household median income was $25,259 and for a family was $27,897. Males had a median income of $25,600 compared with $15,674 for females. The per capita income for the city was $11,735. About 24.2% of families and 29.0% of the population were below the poverty line, including 40.1% of those under age 18 and 23.8% of those age 65 or over.

== Education ==
Uvalde is within the Uvalde Consolidated Independent School District, which operates Uvalde High School. Southwest Texas Junior College has a campus next to Uvalde on the site of Garner Field. The Garner Field facility also houses a campus of Sul Ross State University.

== Arts and culture ==
The John Nance Garner House in Uvalde, which was home to John Nance Garner for 30 years, chronicles his life. Garner served as Speaker of the United States House of Representatives from 1931 to 1933, and as Franklin D. Roosevelt's Vice President from 1933 to 1941. Also in Uvalde are:

- The Aviation Museum at Garner Field has displays of World War II aircraft.
- The Briscoe Art and Antique Collection displays the collection of former Texas governor Dolph Briscoe.
- The Janey Slaughter Briscoe Grand Opera House hosts community theater and concerts.

== Parks and recreation ==
Uvalde is known as one of the best locations for gliding in the United States. It was the site of the 1991, 2012, and 2024 World Gliding Championships. The Uvalde area of the Texas Hill Country is home to many native and exotic species of animals, which allow sportsmen almost year-round hunting opportunities.

Outdoor Life magazine named Uvalde County one of the best white-tailed deer hunting areas in the world.

The seal of the City of Uvalde (version 1)

== Transportation ==
=== Roads ===
==== Highways ====
- US 83
- US 90
- SH 55

==== Farm to Market Roads ====
- FM 481
- FM 117
- FM 140
- FM 1023

== Notable people ==
- Oscar Albarado, world champion boxer
- Bobby Bonner, former MLB shortstop
- Dolph Briscoe, former governor of Texas
- Pete Conrad, former astronaut, resident for 30 years
- Dale Evans, actress, singer-songwriter, author
- King Fisher, gunslinger, sheriff of Uvalde County 1881 and 1883, buried in Uvalde
- John Nance Garner, the 32nd Vice President of the United States
- Pat Garrett, Old West lawman, killer of Billy the Kid, one time resident of Uvalde
- Carlos Guevara, former MLB pitcher
- Harvey Hildebran, former Texas state representative
- Dave Hilton, former MLB third baseman
- Ben Kinchlow, former co-host of The 700 Club
- Matthew McConaughey, Oscar-winning actor
- Vann McElroy, former NFL star and Super Bowl winner.
- Tom O'Folliard, American outlaw, friend of Billy the Kid
- Brooks Raley, MLB pitcher for the New York Mets.
- Terry Shand, pianist, vocalist, bandleader and songwriter.
- Marshall Ashmun Upson, American journalist, ghostwriter of Pat Garrett's 1882 book The Authentic Life of Billy, the Kid, buried in Uvalde.
- Los Palominos, Grammy award-winning tejano music band

== See also ==
- Reading Wood Black

== Sources ==
- "History of Uvalde, Texas". City of Uvalde, Texas. Archived from the original on February 12, 2010.
