= Dabney =

Dabney may refer to:

== Places in the United States ==
- Dabney, Arkansas, an unincorporated community
- Dabney, Indiana, an unincorporated community
- Dabney, Kentucky, an unincorporated community
- Dabney, North Carolina, an unincorporated community
- Dabney, Texas, a former mining community
- Dabney, West Virginia, an unincorporated community
- Dabneys, Virginia, an unincorporated community
- Dabney State Recreation Area, Oregon

== People with the given name ==
- Dabney Carr (1773–1837), Virginia lawyer, writer and Virginia Supreme Court of Appeals justice, son of the Virginia assemblyman below
- Dabney Carr (Virginia assemblyman) (1743–1773), member of the Virginia House of Burgesses and brother-in-law of Thomas Jefferson
- Dabney Cosby (c. 1793–1862), American architect
- Dabney Coleman (1932–2024), American actor
- Dabney dos Santos (born 1996), Dutch footballer
- Dabney Friedrich (born 1967), American attorney and district court judge
- Dabney H. Maury (1822–1900), United States Army officer and American Civil War Confederate major general
- Dabney Montgomery (1923–2016), African-American World War II soldier, member of the Tuskegee Airmen, and bodyguard to Martin Luther King Jr.

== People with the surname ==
- Augusta Dabney (1918–2008), American actress
- Austin Dabney (c. 1765–1830), freed slave and militiaman in the American Revolutionary War
- Charles W. Dabney (1794–1871), US consul in the Azores 1826–1871, industrialist
- Charles William Dabney (1855–1945), President of the University of Tennessee
- Dede Dabney, American music columnist
- Drake Dabney (born 2002), American football player
- Ford Dabney (1883–1958), American ragtime pianist, composer, and band leader
- George Dabney (1808–1868), American educator and anti-slavery activist
- John Dabney (1752–1819), postmaster, publisher and bookseller in Salem, Massachusetts
- John A. Dabney (1903–1991), American general
- John Bass Dabney (1766–1826), industrialist and US consul in the Azores 1806–1826
- Robert Lewis Dabney (1820–1898), American minister and theologian
- Sharon Dabney (born 1959), American retired sprinter
- Stephanie Dabney (1958–2022), American ballerina
- Ted Dabney (1937–2018), co-founder of Atari Computers
- Virginius Dabney (1901–1995), American teacher, journalist, writer, and editor
- Wendell Phillips Dabney (1865–1952), American musician, civil rights activist, author, newspaper editor and publisher
- William Dabney (disambiguation)

== Other uses ==
- Dabney House, an undergraduate student residence at the California Institute of Technology
- Dabney Oil Syndicate
- Humperdink Duck, also known as Dabney Duck, is a Disney character, paternal grandfather of Donald Duck
