= List of Farm to Market Roads in Texas (1000–1099) =

- Texas Farm to Market Road and Ranch to Market Road markers

Highway names
- Interstates: Interstate Highway X (IH-X, I-X)
- US Highways: U.S. Highway X (US X)
- State: State Highway X (SH X)
- Loops: Loop X
- Spurs: Spur X
- Recreational: Recreational Road X (RE X)
- Farm or Ranch to Market Roads: Farm to Market Road X (FM X); Ranch to Market Road X (RM X)
- Park Roads: Park Road X (PR X)

System links
- Highways in Texas; Interstate; US; State; Former; Toll; Loops; Spurs; FM/RM; Park; Rec

Farm to Market Roads in Texas are owned and maintained by the Texas Department of Transportation (TxDOT).

== FM 1000 ==
Farm to Market Road 1000
- Location: Titus County
- Length: 5.984 mi (9.630 km)
- Existed: November 23, 1948–present

Farm to Market Road 1000 (FM 1000) is located in Titus County.

FM 1000 begins at an intersection with SH 49, heading east on a two-lane undivided road. The road passes through areas of farms and woods with some homes, winding to the east. The highway makes a turn to the north and runs through more agricultural areas with some patches of woodland and residences. FM 1000 crosses a Union Pacific railroad line and enters the community of Cookville, heading northwest past a few homes and businesses, ending at US 67.

FM 1000 was first designated onto its current alignment on November 23, 1948. On September 27, 2001, the route was proposed to extend west from SH 49 to an intersection with US 271. The proposed extension of FM 1000 was extended further west on February 28, 2008, to reflect a planned relocation of US 271. On March 28, 2013, the section from US 271 to FM 1735 was redesignated as FM 4000 and the section from FM 1735 to SH 49 was removed from the state highway system due to change in the project scope.

== FM 1001 ==
Farm to Market Road 1001
- Location: Titus County
- Length: 8.834 mi (Note: The certified length given is shorter than the actual mileage, as the TxDOT description of FM 1001 considers it to be discontinuous at rather than concurrent with the I-30 frontage road.) (14.217 km)
- Existed: November 23, 1948–present

Farm to Market Road 1001 (FM 1001) is located in Titus County.

FM 1001 begins at an intersection with US 67/FM 2348 just east of Mount Pleasant. The highway travels in a northeast direction and crosses I-30 before entering Argo. After leaving Argo, FM 1001 turns east and ends at an intersection with FM 1993/County Road 3425.

FM 1001 was designated on November 23, 1948, running from US 67 to Argo. The highway was extended to its current terminus at FM 1993 on October 29, 1953.

== FM 1002 ==
Farm to Market Road 1002
- Location: Upshur County
- Length: 15.823 mi (25.465 km)
- Existed: November 23, 1948–present

Farm to Market Road 1002 (FM 1002) is located in Upshur County.

FM 1002 begins at an intersection with SH 155 north of Big Sandy. The highway intersects with SH 154 in Rhonesboro and ends at an intersection with FM 852 southeast of Winnsboro.

FM 1002 was designated on November 23, 1948, running from SH 155 northwest to Shady Grove. The highway was extended further north to SH 154 in Rhonesboro on November 20, 1951. FM 1002 was extended 1.8 miles (2.9 km) north of SH 154 on November 25, 1975. The last change came on April 25, 1978, when the highway was extended to FM 852.

Junction list

The entire route is in Upshur County.

Location	mi	km	Destinations	Notes
	0.0	0.0	SH 155 – Big Sandy, Gilmer	
	5.7	9.2	FM 1795 south – Hawkins	South end of FM 1795 overlap
	6.3	10.1	FM 1795 north – Latch	North end of FM 1795 overlap
	9.5	15.3	FM 49 east – Little Mound	South end of FM 49 overlap
	9.8	15.8	FM 49 west – Pine Mills	North end of FM 49 overlap
Rhonesboro	12.1	19.5	SH 154 – Quitman, Gilmer	
	15.9	25.6	FM 852	
1.000 mi = 1.609 km; 1.000 km = 0.621 mi: Concurrency terminus

== FM 1003 ==
Farm to Market Road 1003
- Location: Hardin County
- Length: 9.554 mi (Note: The certified length given is shorter than the actual mileage, as the TxDOT description of FM 1003 considers it to be discontinuous at rather than concurrent with FM 1293.) (15.376 km)
- Existed: November 23, 1948–present

Farm to Market Road 1003 (FM 1003) is located in Hardin County.

FM 1003 begins at an intersection with FM 770 near the Big Thicket National Preserve. The highway travels in a predominately northern direction before reaching Honey Island, where the road has a short overlap with FM 1293. After leaving Honey Island, FM 1003 runs in a northeast direction before ending at an intersection with US 69/US 287.

FM 1003 was designated on November 23, 1948, running from US 69 to FM 770. The highway's description was changed on September 1, 1972, to show a break at FM 1293 in Honey Island.

Junction list

The entire route is in Hardin County.

Location	mi	km	Destinations	Notes
	0.0	0.0	FM 770 – Saratoga, Kountze	
Honey Island	4.7	7.6	FM 1293 west – Thicket	South end of FM 1293 overlap
Honey Island	4.9	7.9	FM 1293 east – Kountze	North end of FM 1293 overlap
	7.9	12.7	FM 943 west – Livingston	
	9.7	15.6	US 69 / US 287 – Wildwood, Kountze	
1.000 mi = 1.609 km; 1.000 km = 0.621 mi: Concurrency terminus

== FM 1004 ==
Farm to Market Road 1004
- Location: Jasper and Newton counties
- Length: 22.123 mi (Note: The certified length given is shorter than the actual mileage, as the TxDOT description of FM 1004 considers it to be discontinuous at rather than concurrent with US 96.) (35.604 km)
- Existed: November 23, 1948–present

Farm to Market Road 1004 (FM 1004) is located in Jasper and Newton counties.

FM 1004 begins at an intersection with US 96/SH 62 in Buna. The highway travels through rural areas of Jasper County. FM 1004 turns east at Jasper County Road 626 and has an overlap with US 96 near Call Junction. The highway enters Call just east of the Jasper–Newton county line. FM 1004 runs south of E.O. Siecke State Forest before ending at an intersection with SH 87.

FM 1004 was designated on November 23, 1948, running from US 96 at Call Junction east to SH 87 at Front Creek. The highway was extended westward, southward and southeastward to US 96 in Buna on October 28, 1953. Most of this extension absorbed part of the cancelled FM 1407.

Junction list

County	Location	mi	km	Destinations	Notes
Jasper	Buna	0.0	0.0	US 96 / SH 62 south to Bus. US 96 – Kirbyville, Evadale	
Jasper		15.5	24.9	US 96 south – Buna	South end of US 96 overlap
Jasper		15.8	25.4	US 96 north – Kirbyville	North end of US 96 overlap
Newton	Call	18.4	29.6	FM 1013 west – Kirbyville	
Newton		22.2	35.7	FM 82 west – Kirbyville, E.O. Siecke State Forest	
Newton		22.4	36.0	SH 87 – Newton, Orange	
1.000 mi = 1.609 km; 1.000 km = 0.621 mi: Concurrency terminus

== FM 1005 ==
Farm to Market Road 1005
- Location: Jasper County
- Length: 10.457 mi (16.829 km)
- Existed: November 23, 1948–present

Farm to Market Road 1005 (FM 1005) is located in Jasper County.

FM 1005 begins at an intersection with FM 1013 northeast of Kirbyville. The highway travels through Magnolia Springs and intersects FM 252 northeast of town before ending at an intersection with US 96.

FM 1005 was designated on November 23, 1948, running from US 96 in Kirbyville southward 2.9 miles (4.7 km) toward Call. The highway was extended to FM 1004 at Call on November 23, 1949. FM 1005 was extended to a road intersection 5 miles (8.0 km) northwest of Kirbyville on May 23, 1951. Later that year on November 20, the highway was extended to US 96 at Zion Hill, absorbing all of the cancelled FM 1006. FM 1006 was reassigned to a road in Orange County. The last change came on December 1, 1958, when the section of FM 1005 from Mount Union to Call was transferred to FM 1013.

== FM 1006 ==
Farm to Market Road 1006
- Location: Orange County
- Length: 6.491 mi (10.446 km)
- Existed: December 17, 1952–present

Farm to Market Road 1006 (FM 1006) is located in Orange County.

FM 1006 begins at an intersection with SH 87 in southwestern Orange near Orange County Airport. The highway travels around the southern part of the town and turns north onto Bridge Street near the Sabine River (the Louisiana state line). FM 1006 travels north on Bridge Street before ending at an intersection with Bus. US 90.

The current FM 1006 was designated on December 17, 1952, running from SH 87 to US 90, absorbing Spur 171 in the process.

Junction list

The entire route is in Orange, Orange County.

mi	km	Destinations	Notes
0.0	0.0	SH 87 – Bridge City, Orange	
3.6	5.8	FM 2177 north – West Orange	
6.5	10.5	Bus. US 90 (Green Avenue) to I-10	
1.000 mi = 1.609 km; 1.000 km = 0.621 mi

=== FM 1006 (1948) ===
Farm to Market Road 1006
- Location: Jasper County
- Existed: November 23, 1948–January 16, 1952

The original FM 1006 was designated on November 23, 1948 from US 96 to Magnolia Springs. FM 1006 was cancelled on January 16, 1952 and transferred to FM 1005.

== FM 1007 ==
Farm to Market Road 1007
- Location: Jasper County
- Length: 6.444 mi (10.371 km)
- Existed: November 23, 1948–present

Farm to Market Road 1007 (FM 1007) is located in Jasper County. It runs from RE 255 northeast to a dead end.

FM 1007 was designated on November 23, 1948 from US 96, 12 miles north of Jasper, to a point 1.8 miles east. On May 5, 1966 the road was extended southwest 4.7 miles to FM 255 (now RE 255).

== FM 1008 ==
Farm to Market Road 1008
- Location: Liberty County
- Length: 17.25 mi (27.76 km)
- Existed: November 23, 1948–present

Farm to Market Road 1008 (FM 1008) is located in Liberty County. It runs from SH 321 in Dayton via Kenefick to SH 321 north of Dayton.

FM 1008 was designated on November 23, 1948, from SH 321 in Dayton to a point 8.2 miles (13.2 km) west. On January 25, 1950, the western terminus was relocated, absorbing a 0.3-mile (0.48 km) section of FM 686. On November 20, 1951, the road was extended northeast 5.1 miles (8.2 km) to Kenefick. On December 17, 1952, the road was extended northeast 0.8 miles (1.3 km) from Kenefick. On October 28, 1953, a 2.4-mile (3.9 km) section from 6 miles (9.7 km) west of Dayton to FM 686 was transferred to FM 686 and the road was extended west 6.6 miles (10.6 km) to a county road at Huffman and 1.1 miles (1.8 km) north from Kenefick. On September 29, 1954, the road was extended another 4.1 miles (6.6 km) north from Kenefick. On August 24, 1955, the road was extended north 5.5 miles (8.9 km) to FM 164. On October 3, 1955, the road was extended to SH 321, 13 miles (21 km) north of Dayton, replacing FM 164. On December 18, 1956, a 12.5-mile (20.1 km) section from Huffman to SH 321 in Dayton was transferred to FM 1960.

== FM 1009 ==
Farm to Market Road 1009
- Location: Liberty and Jefferson counties
- Length: 7.701 mi (12.394 km)
- Existed: November 23, 1948–present

Farm to Market Road 1009 (FM 1009) is located in Liberty and Jefferson counties. It runs from US 90 in Felicia south, east, and north to US 90 in Nome.

FM 1009 was designated on November 23, 1948 from US 90 at Felicia to a point 1.5 mile west of the Jefferson County line. On July 15, 1949 the road was extended east and north 4.9 miles to US 90 at Nome.

== FM 1010 ==
Farm to Market Road 1010
- Location: Liberty County
- Length: 9.59 mi (15.43 km)
- Existed: November 23, 1948–present

Farm to Market Road 1010 (FM 1010) is located in Liberty County. It runs from SH 321 in Cleveland to Plum Grove.

FM 1010 was designated on November 23, 1948 on the current route.

== FM 1011 ==
Farm to Market Road 1011
- Location: Liberty County
- Length: 7.134 mi (11.481 km)
- Existed: November 23, 1948–present

Farm to Market Road 1011 (FM 1011) is located in Liberty County. It runs from SH 146 northeast of Liberty northwest to a road intersection.

FM 1011 was designated on November 23, 1948 from SH 146 at Hardin to Refinery Road. On July 15, 1949 the road was extended north 1.3 miles to a road intersection. On November 24, 1959 the road was extended south to SH 146 northeast of Liberty, replacing FM 2555, while a 1.6 mile section from-then FM 1411 (now FM 834) east to SH 146 was transferred to FM 834 (which replaced FM 1411 at the same time).

== FM 1012 ==
Farm to Market Road 1012
- Location: Newton County
- Length: 11.022 mi (17.738 km)
- Existed: November 23, 1948–present

Farm to Market Road 1012 (FM 1012) is located in Newton County. It runs from US 190 north to SH 63.

FM 1012 was designated on November 23, 1948 from US 190, 1.75 miles west of Newton, to a road intersection north of Jamestown, but the route was modified on February 23, 1949 to end in Jamestown. On July 15, 1949 the road was extended 5.1 miles from Jamestown to SH 63.

== FM 1013 ==
Farm to Market Road 1013
- Location: Tyler, Jasper, and Newton counties
- Length: 34.595 mi (55.675 km)
- Existed: 1948–present

Farm to Market Road 1013 (FM 1013) is located in Tyler, Jasper and Newton counties.

FM 1013 begins at an intersection with US 69/US 287 in the community of Hillister. The highway travels in a mostly eastern direction and intersects FM 92 in the town of Spurger. East of Spurger, FM 1013 crosses over the Neches River and intersects with FM 1005 before entering the town of Kirbyville. In Kirbyville, the highway intersects FM 252 and briefly turns southeast before turning back east at Main Street. FM 1013 intersects US 96 and turns south onto Elizabeth Avenue and leaves town at FM 82. The highway travels in a mostly southern direction before ending at an intersection with FM 1004 in Call.

FM 1013 was designated on November 23, 1948, running from US 69 at Hillister to FM 92 at Spurger. The highway was extended to FM 1004 at Call on December 5, 1958, absorbing FM 2304 and sections of FM 1005. On April 30, 1962, the break at FM 92 was removed and FM 1013 was slightly rerouted through Spurger.

Junction list

County	Location	mi	km	Destinations	Notes
Tyler	Hillister	0.0	0.0	US 69 / US 287 – Woodville, Kountze	
Tyler	Spurger	13.3	21.4	FM 92 to US 190 – Silsbee	
Jasper		22.9	36.9	FM 1005 north – Magnolia Springs	
Jasper	Kirbyville	30.5	49.1	FM 252 north (Herndon Street)	
Jasper	Kirbyville	31.3	50.4	US 96 (Margaret Avenue) – Jasper, Buna	
Jasper	Kirbyville	32.7	52.6	FM 82	
Newton	Call	34.6	55.7	FM 1004 to US 96 / SH 87	
1.000 mi = 1.609 km; 1.000 km = 0.621 mi

== FM 1014 ==
Farm to Market Road 1014
- Location: Tyler County
- Length: 1.183 mi (1.904 km)
- Existed: November 23, 1948–present

Farm to Market Road 1014 (FM 1014) is located in Tyler County. It runs from US 69 near the Jasper County line to Rockland.

FM 1014 was designated on November 23, 1948 on the current route.

== FM 1015 ==
Farm to Market Road 1015
- Location: Hidalgo County
- Length: 30.106 mi (48.451 km)
- Existed: 1948–present

Farm to Market Road 1015 (FM 1015) is located in Hidalgo County.

FM 1015 was designated on November 23, 1948 from SH 107 at Edcouch to a point 4 miles north. FM 1015 underwent several extensions: north 1 mile on February 23, 1949, 6 miles to the Willacy County line and another 2.5 miles to a road intersection in Lasara on July 15, 1949, north 1.1 miles to SH 186 on November 20, 1951 and 11.3 miles south to US 83 over FM 2060 on April 20, 1954. On October 24, 1963 FM 1015 was extended to the Rio Grande, replacing a section of FM 88 and creating a concurrency with US 281. On August 28, 1989 a 1.9 mile section from 0.6 mile south of Llano Grande Lake south to US 281 was added. On September 30, 2004 FM 1015 was rerouted in Progreso; the old route became FM Spur 1015.

== FM 1016 ==
Farm to Market Road 1016
- Location: Hidalgo County
- Length: 8.487 mi (13.659 km)
- Existed: 1948–present

Farm to Market Road 1016 (FM 1016) is located in Hidalgo County. The highway is known locally as S. Conway Road in Mission and Military Highway in McAllen.

FM 1016 begins at I-2/US 83 in Mission, with Conway Road continuing into the city as SH 107. The highway travels in a southern direction and turns southeast near the Madero neighborhood, with the highway running in close proximity to the Rio Grande. FM 1016 turns east at FM 494 and runs through less developed areas of the city. The highway crosses FM 396 and enters McAllen after the intersection with Shary Road. Between FM 396 and Spur 115, FM 1016 runs through a heavily industrialized area with many business parks. The highway travels through a mainly rural area before ending at an intersection with SH 336.

FM 1016 was designated on November 23, 1948, running from US 83 in Mission to SH 336 south of McAllen as a redesignation of part of SH 107. A small section of the highway in McAllen was transferred to FM 1926 on June 10, 1952. Part of FM 1016 in Mission was transferred to SH 107 on May 21, 1979. The highway was relocated on January 26, 1983, between FM 494 and Spur 115. On December 18, 1986, FM 1016 was relocated west of Spur 115. On June 27, 1995, the entire route was redesignated Urban Road 1016 (UR 1016). The designation reverted to FM 1016 with the elimination of the Urban Road system on November 15, 2018.

The entire route is in Hidalgo County.

Location	mi	km	Destinations	Notes
Mission	0.0	0.0	I-2 / US 83 (Expressway 83) / SH 107 north (Conway Avenue)	I-2 exit 136
Mission	2.9	4.7	FM 494 south (Military Road) – La Lomita Mission	
Mission	3.9	6.3	FM 396 (Anzalduas Highway) – Anzalduas International Bridge	
McAllen	7.5	12.1	Spur 115 (S. 23rd Street)	
McAllen	8.5	13.7	SH 336 (S. 10th Street)	
1.000 mi = 1.609 km; 1.000 km = 0.621 mi

== FM 1017 ==
Farm to Market Road 1017
- Location: Jim Hogg, Starr, and Hidalgo counties
- Length: 76.088 mi (Note: The certified length given is shorter than the actual mileage, as the TxDOT description of FM 1017 considers it to be discontinuous at rather than concurrent with FM 755.) (122.452 km)
- Existed: 1948–present

Farm to Market Road 1017 (FM 1017) is located in Jim Hogg, Starr and Hidalgo counties.

FM 1017 begins at an intersection with US 281/SH 186 in San Manuel-Linn. The highway travels in a slight northwest direction through the town and intersects FM 3250 just west of the town. FM 1017 travels through La Reforma before entering San Isidro, intersecting FM 2294. The highway continues to run through rural areas before entering La Gloria, beginning an overlap with FM 755. After leaving FM 755, FM 1017 travels in a westward direction before turning towards the north at FM 2686. The highway travels in a mostly northern direction before ending at an intersection with SH 285 in Hebbronville.

FM 1017 was designated on November 23, 1948, running from US 281 to a point approximately 3 miles (4.8 km) to the west. The highway was extended further west and north to the Jim Hogg County line on November 30, 1949, replacing FM 1431 and FM 1429, running at total a distance of approximately 36.8 miles (59.2 km). FM 1017 was then extended to SH 285 near Hebbronville on November 20, 1951. On June 10, 1952, a section of FM 1017 was transferred to FM 755. There was a proposed extension of the highway to SH 359 on August 29, 1989, but this was cancelled as the court commissioner of Jim Hogg County did not accept the extension.

Junction list

County	Location	mi	km	Destinations	Notes
Hidalgo	San Manuel-Linn	0.0	0.0	Future I-69C / US 281 / SH 186 east – Falfurrias, Edinburg, Raymondville	U.S. 281 is the future Interstate 69C
Hidalgo		3.0	4.8	FM 3250 south	
Hidalgo		16.7	26.9	FM 681 south – McCook, Mission	
Starr	San Isidro	24.1	38.8	FM 2294 south – Delmita	
Starr	La Gloria	29.5	47.5	FM 755 north – Falfurrias	South end of FM 755 overlap
Starr		29.9	48.1	FM 755 south – Rio Grande City	North end of FM 755 overlap
Starr		32.5	52.3	FM 2686 west to FM 649	
Jim Hogg	Hebbronville	76.6	123.3	SH 285 – Hebbronville, Falfurrias	
1.000 mi = 1.609 km; 1.000 km = 0.621 mi: Concurrency terminus

== FM 1018 ==
Farm to Market Road 1018
- Location: Willacy County
- Length: 12.867 mi (20.707 km)
- Existed: November 23, 1948–present

Farm to Market Road 1018 (FM 1018) is located in Willacy County. It runs from Business US 77-W (formerly Loop 448 and US 77 before that) north of Sebastian to FM 1420 at Santa Monica.

FM 1018 was designated on November 23, 1948 on the current route.

== FM 1019 ==
Farm to Market Road 1019
- Location: Dimmit County
- Length: 6.314 mi (10.161 km)
- Existed: November 23, 1948–present

Farm to Market Road 1019 (FM 1019) is located in Dimmit County. It runs from FM 468 southeast to a road intersection.

FM 1019 was designated on November 23, 1948 from SH 85, 3.1 miles east of Big Wells, to Valley Wells. On February 25, 1949 a 1 mile spur connection to Valley Wells was added, but this was removed nine months later and reassigned to FM 1558. On July 31, 1952 a 1.5 mile section was transferred to FM 468.

== FM 1020 ==
Farm to Market Road 1020
- Location: Karnes County
- Length: 5.021 mi (8.081 km)
- Existed: May 23, 1951–present

Farm to Market Road 1020 (FM 1020) is located in Karnes County. It runs from FM 51 in Runge to Eckhart School.

FM 1020 was designated on May 23, 1951 on the current route.

=== FM 1020 (1948) ===
Farm to Market Road 1020
- Location: Edwards County
- Existed: November 23, 1948–April 18, 1949

A previous route numbered FM 1020 was designated on November 23, 1948 from SH 41 (now US 377) to a point 8.7 miles (14.0 km) southwest. FM 1020 was cancelled on April 18, 1949 and became a portion of FM 674 (now RM 674).

== FM 1021 ==
Farm to Market Road 1021
- Location: Maverick County
- Length: 31.766 mi (51.122 km)
- Existed: 1948–present

Farm to Market Road 1021 (FM 1021) is located in Maverick County.

FM 1021 begins at Old Mines Road, an unpaved county road, in a rural area of Maverick County; Old Mines Road continues southeast, becoming Eagle Pass Road in Webb County, which then becomes FM 1472. The highway travels through rural areas with many farms and ranches before entering El Indio, intersecting FM 2644 in the town. FM 1021 continues to travel by rural farms and ranches until crossing the Rosita Creek, with the route becoming more suburban. The highway travels along the city limits of Rosita and Chula Vista, passing near the Kickapoo Traditional Tribe of Texas reservation. FM 1021 cross Loop 480 then runs along the southern border of Las Quintas Fronterizas. The highway enters Eagle Pass near the FM 3443 (Veterans Boulevard) intersection. FM 1021 travels in a northwest-southeast direction along El Indio Highway, passing near several residential and retail areas. The highway turns north onto Monroe Street near the Camino Real International Bridge, then intersects US 57 (Garrison Street), before ending at intersection with Spur 240 (Main Street).

FM 1021 was designated on November 23, 1948, running from SH 85 (which later became US 277) near Eagle Pass to El Indio. The highway's beginning was moved to SH 76 (now US 57) on April 21, 1949. FM 1021 was extended 8.0 miles (12.9 km) south of El Indio on July 15, 1949. The highway was extended another approximately 2.7 miles (4.3 km) on January 27, 1950, and was extended another 3.0 miles (4.8 km) to its current terminus on July 11, 1968.

Junction list

The entire route is in Maverick County.

Location	mi	km	Destinations	Notes
	0.0	0.0	Old Mines Road	State maintenance begins; roadway continues south as Old Mines Road
El Indio	13.2	21.2	FM 2644 east – Carrizo Springs	
Rosita	24.1	38.8	FM 2030 west	
Chula Vista	25.7	41.4	FM 2030 east	
Eagle Pass	27.7	44.6	Loop 480	Interchange
Eagle Pass	29.4	47.3	FM 3443 north (Veterans Boulevard)	
Eagle Pass	30.4	48.9	FM 375 north (Bibb Street) / Brown Street	
Eagle Pass	31.7	51.0	US 57 (Garrison Street)	
Eagle Pass	31.9	51.3	Spur 240 (Main Street)	
1.000 mi = 1.609 km; 1.000 km = 0.621 mi

== RM 1022 ==
Ranch to Market Road 1022
- Location: Uvalde County
- Length: 7.815 mi (12.577 km)
- Existed: November 23, 1948 (Note: RM 1022 was originally designated as FM 1022 from 1948 to 1959.)–present

Ranch to Market Road 1022 (RM 1022) is located in Uvalde County.

RM 1022 begins at a dead end near the former mining community of Dabney. The highway travels in an east direction, with the highway forking northeast of the town, with the other section of RM 1022 traveling to the main entrance of the Vulcan Materials Company. The highway turns north and runs parallel to a rail line until passing in between the White Company Lake and the Uvalde Rock Asphalt Company Lake. RM 1022 runs by several ranches and rock quarries before ending at an intersection with US 90.

RM 1022 was designated on November 23, 1948, as Farm to Market Road 1022 (FM 1022), running from US 90 west of Uvalde to Blewett. The highway was extended to Dabney on November 20, 1951. On October 17, 1959, the road was redesignated as RM 1022.

== FM 1023 ==
Farm to Market Road 1023
- Location: Uvalde County
- Length: 11.7 mi (Note: The certified length given is shorter than the actual mileage, as the TxDOT description of FM 1023 considers it to be discontinuous at rather than concurrent with US 90.) (18.8 km)
- Existed: December 20, 1948–present

Farm to Market Road 1023 (FM 1023) is located in Uvalde County.

FM 1023 begins at intersection with FM 1049/County Road 301 south of Knippa. The highway is signed as north–south despite running in a southwest–northeast direction for most of its length. FM 1023 enters Uvalde near Garner Field, where it intersects with FM 1574. FM 1023 runs along Garner Field Road and has a short overlap with US 90 before running on 4th Street. The highway runs along 4th Street in eastern Uvalde before ending at an intersection with FM 2369.

FM 1023 was designated on December 20, 1948, running from US 90 east of Uvalde to Garner Field. This section of highway was formerly a part of FM 187. FM 1023 was extended north from US 90 to FM 2369 on May 22, 1959. This section was rerouted later, with the old route becoming FM 3447 on January 26, 1983. On May 6, 1964, FM 1023 was extended north from Garner Field to US 90. On October 15, 1965, the section between US 90 and Garner Field was renumbered FM 1574. The highway was extended to County Road 302 on June 2, 1967. The last change came on July 11, 1968, when FM 1023 was extended to FM 1049.

Junction list

The entire route is in Uvalde County.

Location	mi	km	Destinations	Notes
	0.0	0.0	FM 1049 north / County Road 301 – Knippa	
Uvalde	8.4	13.5	FM 1574 north (Ham Lane)	
Uvalde	10.0	16.1	US 90 east (Main Street)	South end of US 90 overlap
Uvalde	10.1	16.3	US 90 west (Main Street)	North end of US 90 overlap
Uvalde	11.8	19.0	FM 2369 (Hacienda Road)	
1.000 mi = 1.609 km; 1.000 km = 0.621 mi: Concurrency terminus

== RM 1024 ==
Ranch to Market Road 1024
- Location: Val Verde County
- Length: 52.272 mi (84.124 km)
- Existed: November 23, 1948 (Note: RM 1024 was originally designated as FM 1024 from 1948 to 1959.)–present

Ranch to Market Road 1024 (RM 1024) is located in Val Verde County. It runs from US 90 near Comstock northward and westward to an intersection with Langtry Road and Pandale Road near Pandale.

RM 1024 was designated on November 23, 1948, as Farm to Market Road 1024 (FM 1024), running from US 90 near Comstock to a point northwestward at a distance of 7.9 miles (12.7 km). On July 15, 1949, FM 1024 was extended northwestward 8.0 miles (12.9 km). On June 21, 1951, FM 1024 was extended northwestward 6.5 miles (10.5 km). On January 23, 1953, FM 1024 was extended northwest 5 miles (8.0 km). On October 29, 1953, FM 1024 was extended northwest 1.0 mile (1.6 km). On October 17, 1959, FM 1024 was redesignated as RM 1024. On September 27, 1960, RM 1024 was extended northwestward 4.8 miles (7.7 km). On May 2, 1962, RM 1024 was extended northwest 4 miles (6.4 km). On May 5, 1966, RM 1024 was extended northwest 7.7 miles (12.4 km). On June 2, 1967, RM 1024 was extended westward 2 miles (3.2 km). On November 5, 1971, RM 1024 was extended westward 5.9 miles (9.5 km) to its current terminus.

== FM 1025 ==
Farm to Market Road 1025
- Location: Zavala County
- Length: 19.525 mi (31.422 km)
- Existed: November 23, 1948–present

Farm to Market Road 1025 (FM 1025) is located in Zavala County. It runs from US 83 east and northeast to FM 117 south of Batesville.

FM 1025 was designated on November 23, 1948 from US 83, 6 miles north of Crystal City, to a point 5.5 miles (8.9 km) east. On July 14, 1949 the road was extended east 1.7 miles (2.7 km), and another 12 miles (19 km) northeast to FM 117 south of Batesville on February 21, 1950.

== FM 1026 ==
Farm to Market Road 1026
- Location: Coleman County
- Length: 24.912 mi (40.092 km)
- Existed: November 23, 1948–present

Farm to Market Road 1026 (FM 1026) is located in Coleman County. It runs from SH 206 south, east, north, and east to US 283.

FM 1026 was designated on November 23, 1948 from US 67 (now SH 206), 5 miles southwest of Coleman, south 5.6 miles (9.0 km) to a point 1.4 miles northeast of Fisk. On August 22, 1951 the road was extended 3.5 miles (5.6 km) south to a road intersection. Three months later the road was extended 3 miles (4.8 km) to a road intersection in Mozelle. On December 2, 1954 the road was extended south, east, north and east 14 miles to US 283.

== FM 1027 ==
Farm to Market Road 1027
- Location: Eastland County
- Length: 13.329 mi (21.451 km)
- Existed: November 23, 1948–present

Farm to Market Road 1027 (FM 1027) is located in Eastland County. It runs from FM 587 east of Rising Star to Loop 389 in Carbon.

FM 1027 was designated on November 23, 1948 in two sections: a southern section from SH 36 east of Rising Star to Okra, and a northern section from a point 4.3 miles (6.9 km) southwest of Carbon to SH 6 (now Loop 389) in Carbon. On July 15, 1949 the southern section was extended 3.5 miles (5.6 km) north from Okra, shortening the gap. On May 23, 1951 the two sections were connected. On April 23, 1958 a 0.8 mile section from SH 36 to FM 587 was transferred to FM 587.

== FM 1028 ==
Farm to Market Road 1028
- Location: McCulloch County
- Length: 10.56 mi (16.99 km)
- Existed: 1948–present

Farm to Market Road 1028 (FM 1028) is located in McCulloch County. It runs from US 377 east and north to FM 502.

FM 1028 was designated on November 23, 1948 from US 283 (now US 377) northeast of Brady east 2.8 miles (4.5 km) to a road intersection near Placid. On July 21, 1949, the road was extended east and north 4.1 miles (6.6 km) to another road intersection. On October 31, 1957, the road was extended north to FM 502.

== FM 1029 ==
Farm to Market Road 1029
- Location: Mills County
- Length: 6.947 mi (11.180 km)
- Existed: 1948–present

Farm to Market Road 1029 (FM 1029) is located in Mills County. It runs from US 85 north to FM 3484.

FM 1029 was designated on November 23, 1948 from US 84 northward 3.0 miles (4.8 km). On November 25, 1975, the road was extended north 4.2 miles (6.8 km) to what is now FM 3484.

== FM 1030 ==
Farm to Market Road 1030
- Location: San Saba County
- Length: 7.365 mi (11.853 km)
- Existed: 1948–present

Farm to Market Road 1030 (FM 1030) is located in San Saba County. It runs from US 190 southwest to end of pavement.

FM 1030 was designated on November 23, 1948 from US 190 southwest 2.5 miles (4.0 km). On July 14, 1949, the road was extended 1.4 miles (2.3 km) to Wallace Creek School. On October 29, 1992, the road was extended southwest 3.5 miles (5.6 km).

== FM 1031 ==
Farm to Market Road 1031
- Location: San Saba County
- Length: 9.73 mi (15.66 km)
- Existed: 1948–present

Farm to Market Road 1031 (FM 1031) is located in San Saba County. It runs from US 190 southeast to a road intersection.

FM 1031 was designated on November 23, 1948, from US 190 in San Saba southeast 3 miles (4.8 km) to a road intersection. On May 25, 1976, the road was extended southeast 3.3 miles (5.3 km). On October 26, 1983, the road was extended southeast 3.4 miles (5.5 km) to a road intersection.

== FM 1032 ==
Farm to Market Road 1032
- Location: Stephens County
- Length: 4.285 mi (6.896 km)
- Existed: 1948–present

Farm to Market Road 1032 (FM 1032) is located in Stephens County. Its eastern terminus is at US 183, 10.5 miles (16.9 km) south of Breckenridge, and its western terminus is at CR 187/190.

FM 1032 was designated on November 23, 1948, on its current route.

== FM 1033 ==
Farm to Market Road 1033
- Location: Childress and Cottle counties
- Length: 16.529 mi (26.601 km)
- Existed: 1948–present

Farm to Market Road 1033 (FM 1033) is located in Childress and Cottle counties. It runs from a road intersection south to FM 104.

FM 1033 was designated on November 23, 1948, to run from Loop 6 in Kirkland (now Road KB) south 4.0 miles (6.4 km). On October 28, 1953, the road was extended south to FM 104. On September 21, 1955, a section from US 287 north to FM 268 was added, creating a concurrency with Loop 6. On October 9, 1961, the road was extended north to a road intersection, replacing a section of FM 268. On October 4, 1972, the concurrency with Loop 6 was eliminated, as the road was rerouted from Loop 6 to 287, and Loop 6 was cancelled.

== FM 1034 ==
Farm to Market Road 1034
- Location: Childress County
- Length: 9.036 mi (14.542 km)
- Existed: 1948–present

Farm to Market Road 1034 (FM 1034) is located in Childress County. It runs from US 83 north of Buck Creek east via Arlie to FM 1642.

FM 1034 was designated on November 23, 1948, to run from US 83 east 4.0 miles (6.4 km). On May 23, 1951, the road was extended east 2.0 miles (3.2 km) to Arlie. On October 31, 1957, the road was extended east to FM 1642.

== FM 1035 ==
Farm to Market Road 1035
- Location: Collingsworth County
- Length: 5.087 mi (8.187 km)
- Existed: 1948–present

Farm to Market Road 1035 (FM 1035) is located in Collingsworth County. It runs from SH 203 south to a road intersection.

FM 1035 was designated on November 23, 1948, to run from SH 203 south 2.0 miles (3.2 km) to the north city limits of Wellington. On September 21, 1955 the road extended south 1.0 mile (1.6 km) to FM 338. On October 31, 1957, the road was extended south 2.0 miles (3.2 km) to a road intersection.

== FM 1036 ==
Farm to Market Road 1036
- Location: Collingsworth County
- Length: 7.966 mi (12.820 km)
- Existed: 1948–present

Farm to Market Road 1036 (FM 1036) is located in Collingsworth County. It runs from FM 1547 in Dozier south and east to US 83.

FM 1036 was designated on November 23, 1948, to run from US 83 west and north to Dozier (at what is now FM 1547). On July 15, 1949, the road was extended north 3.0 miles (4.8 km), but this extension was renumbered FM 1547 on October 26, as the route was rerouted to go west 4.0 miles (6.4 km) from Dozier instead. On June 1, 1966, the section from Dozier west to then-FM 1056 was transferred to FM 1547, and the section from there west 1.0 mile (1.6 km) was renumbered FM 3070 (now FM 3143).

== FM 1037 ==
Farm to Market Road 1037
- Location: Cottle County
- Length: 10.628 mi (17.104 km)
- Existed: 1948–present

Farm to Market Road 1037 (FM 1037) is located in Cottle County. The road begins at US 62/US 83 in Paducah, and continues west, then south, ending at County Road 230 in Cottle County north of Delwin.

FM 1037 was designated on November 23, 1948, from US 70 east of Paducah west 0.7 miles (1.1 km) to end of pavement on Backus Avenue in Paducah. On September 21, 1955, another segment of FM 1037 was designated from US 83 west to US 70 west of Paducah. This created a gap in the route's mileage. On January 22, 1957, FM 1037 was extended from the end of pavement on Backus Avenue to US 83. This closed the gap. On October 31, 1958, FM 1037 was extended south 3.2 miles (5.1 km) from US 70 west of Paducah.

== FM 1038 ==
Farm to Market Road 1038
- Location: Cottle County
- Length: 17.228 mi (27.726 km)
- Existed: 1948–present

Farm to Market Road 1038 (FM 1038) is located in Cottle County. It runs from US 83 in Paducah east, south and east to end of pavement.

FM 1038 was designated on November 23, 1948, to run from US 83 southeast 9.7 miles (15.6 km) to Salt Creek School. On October 28, 1953, the road extended east 4.1 miles (6.6 km) to Hackberry. On October 31, 1958, the road extended east 3.5 miles (5.6 km) to its current end.

== FM 1039 ==
Farm to Market Road 1039
- Location: Foard County
- Length: 2.542 mi (4.091 km)
- Existed: 1948–present

Farm to Market Road 1039 (FM 1039) is located in Foard County. It runs from US 70 west of Crowell north 2.6 miles (4.2 km).

FM 1039 was designated on November 23, 1948, on the current route.

== FM 1040 ==
Farm to Market Road 1040
- Location: Live Oak County
- Length: 1.145 mi (1.843 km)
- Existed: May 23, 1951–present

Farm to Market Road 1040 (FM 1040) is located in Live Oak County. It runs from FM 888 in Argenta north to a road intersection.

FM 1040 was designated on May 23, 1951, on the current route.

=== FM 1040 (1948) ===
Farm to Market Road 1040
- Location: Foard County
- Existed: November 23, 1948–April 20, 1949

A previous route numbered FM 1040 was designated on November 23, 1948, from US 70 in Thalia southward 4.0 miles (6.4 km). FM 1040 was cancelled on April 20, 1949, and became a portion of FM 262.

== FM 1041 ==
Farm to Market Road 1041
- Location: Hall County
- Length: 17.349 mi (27.921 km)
- Existed: 1948–present

Farm to Market Road 1041 (FM 1041) is located in Hall County. It runs from SH 256 near Memphis south and west via Plaska to FM 657.

FM 1041 was designated on November 23, 1948, to run from SH 256 south 5.3 miles (8.5 km). On October 26, 1954, the road was extended to then-FM 657 in Plaska. On December 24, 1959, the road was extended west to its current, replacing a portion of FM 657 (which was rerouted in a swap with FM 2472).

== FM 1042 ==
Farm to Market Road 1042
- Location: Live Oak County
- Length: 8.687 mi (13.980 km)
- Existed: May 23, 1951–present

Farm to Market Road 1042 (FM 1042) is located in Live Oak County. It runs from US 281 west to Simmons and north to FM 1545.

FM 1042 was designated on May 23, 1951, to run from US 281 to Simmons. On August 29, 1989, the road was extended north to FM 1545.

=== FM 1042 (1948) ===
Farm to Market Road 1042
- Location: Hall County
- Existed: November 23, 1948–May 26, 1949

A previous route numbered FM 1042 was designated on November 23, 1948, from SH 86 near the Briscoe County line, southward a distance of approximately 2.0 miles (3.2 km). Six months later FM 1042 was cancelled in lieu of extending FM 656.

== FM 1043 ==
Farm to Market Road 1043
- Location: Knox County
- Length: 2.431 mi (3.912 km)
- Existed: 1948–present

Farm to Market Road 1043 (FM 1043) is located in Knox County. It runs from SH 222 east of Knox City north to the former Sunset School and east to SH 222.

FM 1043 was designated on November 23, 1948, on the current route.

== FM 1044 ==
Farm to Market Road 1044
- Location: Comal and Guadalupe counties
- Length: 7.787 mi (12.532 km)
- Existed: October 28, 1953–present

Farm to Market Road 1044 (FM 1044) is located in Comal and Guadalupe counties.

FM 1044's northern terminus is in central New Braunfels, at an intersection with the northbound frontage road of I-35 at exit 185. Its southern terminus is at FM 78 east of Marion.

The current FM 1044 designation was established on October 28, 1953, connecting US 81 (now I-35) to FM 78.

=== FM 1044 (1948) ===
Farm to Market Road 1044
- Location: Knox County
- Existed: November 23, 1948–October 28, 1953

A previous route numbered FM 1044 was designated in Knox County on November 23, 1948, from US 82, 1.5 miles (2.4 km) west of the Baylor County line, southward 3.0 miles (4.8 km). On December 17, 1952, it was extended south 1.9 miles (3.1 km). FM 1044 was cancelled on October 28, 1953, and its mileage was transferred to FM 266.

== FM 1045 ==
Farm to Market Road 1045
- Location: Motley County
- Length: 6.903 mi (11.109 km)
- Existed: 1948–present

Farm to Market Road 1045 (FM 1045) is located in Motley County. It runs from SH 70 south of Matador eastward 6.9 miles (11.1 km).

FM 1045 was designated on November 23, 1948, on the current route.

== FM 1046 ==
Farm to Market Road 1046
- Location: Wheeler County
- Length: 20.667 mi (33.260 km)
- Existed: 1948–present

Farm to Market Road 1046 (FM 1046) is located in Wheeler County. It runs from FM 48 at New Mobeetie northeast to FM 277 in Allison.

FM 1046 was designated on November 23, 1948, to run from 3.9 miles (6.3 km) southwest of US 83 north, east and northeast via Briscoe to a point 7.2 miles (11.6 km) northeast of US 83, replacing Spur 195. On July 15, 1949, the road was extended northeast 5.0 miles (8.0 km) to Allison. On May 23, 1951, the road was extended west to New Mobeetie, replacing the FM 48 spur connection.

== FM 1047 ==
Farm to Market Road 1047
- Location: Hamilton, Mills, and Lampasas counties
- Length: 21.015 mi (33.820 km)
- Existed: November 23, 1948–present

Farm to Market Road 1047 (FM 1047) is located in Hamilton, Mills, and Lampasas counties. It begins at an intersection with FM 581 about 7 miles (11 km) northeast of Lometa. FM 1047 travels through mostly rural areas and intersects US 84 near Star. It then crosses the Lampasas River before ending at an intersection with FM 2005 southwest of Hamilton.

FM 1047 was designated on November 23, 1948, running from FM 581 to Lampasas County Road 120. On May 23, 1951, the highway was extended to the Mills County line. FM 1047 was extended to US 84 in Star on November 20, 1951, replacing Spur 183. On May 2, 1962, it was extended to its current terminus at FM 2005, absorbing FM 2707.

Junction list

County	Location	mi	km	Destinations	Notes
Lampasas		0.0	0.0	FM 581 – Lometa, Adamsville	
Lampasas		6.3	10.1	FM 572 west – Goldthwaite	
Mills	Star	12.9	20.8	US 84 – Goldthwaite, Gatesville	
Hamilton		21.0	33.8	FM 2005 – Goldthwaite, Hamilton	
1.000 mi = 1.609 km; 1.000 km = 0.621 mi

== FM 1048 ==
Farm to Market Road 1048
- Location: Falls County
- Length: 5.206 mi (8.378 km)
- Existed: 1948–present

Farm to Market Road 1048 (FM 1048) is located in Falls County. It runs from Loop 265 northeast of Rosebud to FM 2027 in Pleasant Grove.

FM 1048 was designated on November 23, 1948, on the current route. The road was extended over old US 77 to new US 77 in Rosebuf on April 17, 1950, but that extension was transferred to Loop 265 on August 21, 1952.

== FM 1049 ==
Farm to Market Road 1049
- Location: Uvalde County
- Length: 13.885 mi (22.346 km)
- Existed: 1948–present

Farm to Market Road 1049 (FM 1049) is located in Uvalde County. It runs from SH 127 south to FM 1023.

FM 1049 was designated on November 23, 1948, to run from SH 127 to US 90 in Knippa. On December 17, 1952, the road was extended south to its current end.

== RM 1050 ==
Ranch to Market Road 1050
- Location: Uvalde County
- Length: 14.71 mi (23.67 km)
- Existed: November 23, 1948 (Note: RM 1050 was originally designated as FM 1050 from 1948 to 1959.)–present

Ranch to Market Road 1050 (RM 1050) is located in Uvalde County.

RM 1050 begins at an intersection with US 83 near Garner State Park. The highway travels in an eastern direction along the park's northern boundary before intersecting RM 2748. RM 1050 travels through the Texas Hill Country before entering Utopia, ending at an intersection with RM 187.

RM 1050 was designated on November 23, 1948, as Farm to Market Road 1050 (FM 1050), running from FM 187 (now RM 187) in Utopia to US 83. On October 17, 1959, FM 1050 was changed to RM 1050.

== FM 1051 ==
Farm to Market Road 1051
- Location: Uvalde County
- Length: 11.073 mi (17.820 km)
- Existed: November 23, 1948–present

Farm to Market Road 1051 (FM 1051) is located in Uvalde County. Its southern terminus is at an intersection with US 83 southwest of Concan. It travels northwest approximately 11 miles (18 km) to the community of Reagan Wells before state maintenance ends, with the roadway continuing as CR 424.

FM 1051 was designated on November 23, 1948, on its current route.

== FM 1052 ==
Farm to Market Road 1052
- Location: Uvalde County
- Length: 4.453 mi (7.166 km)
- Existed: 1948–present

Farm to Market Road 1052 (FM 1052) is located in Uvalde County. It runs from US 83 in Uvalde to US 90 west of Uvalde.

FM 1052 was designated on November 23, 1948, on the current route.

== FM 1053 ==
Farm to Market Road 1053
- Location: Ector, Crane, and Pecos counties
- Length: 59.378 mi (95.560 km)
- Existed: 1948–present

== FM 1054 ==
Farm to Market Road 1054
- Location: Lynn and Borden counties
- Length: 55.087 mi (88.654 km)
- Existed: 1948–present

Farm to Market Road 1054 (FM 1054) is located in Lynn and Borden counties. It runs from FM 211 southeast of Wilson to FM 1584.

FM 1054 was designated on January 23, 1948, to run from US 380 south 13.4 miles (21.6 km) to a county road south of Draw. On December 16, 1948, the road was extended south 1.1 miles (1.8 km) to the Lynn/Borden County Line. On March 29, 1949, the road was extended south 10.5 miles (16.9 km) to the Mesquite School community. On June 29, 1950, the road was extended south 1.6 miles (2.6 km). On November 20, 1951, the road was extended south 3.5 miles (5.6 km) to US 180. On January 1, 1960, the road was extended north to FM 211, replacing FM 1656 and creating a concurrency with US 380. On November 26, 1969, the road was extended south 3.6 miles (5.8 km) from another point on US 180. On May 7, 1970, the road was extended south 3.0 miles (4.8 km). On November 3, 1972, the road was extended south 4.6 miles (7.4 km). On September 5, 1973, the road was extended south 4.5 miles (7.2 km) to FM 1584.

== FM 1055 ==
Farm to Market Road 1055
- Location: Deaf Smith, Castro, and Lamb counties
- Length: 53.871 mi (86.697 km)
- Existed: 1948–present

Farm to Market Road 1055 (FM 1055) is located in Deaf Smith, Castro and Lamb counties. It runs from US 385 south of Hereford to FM 37 in Amherst.

FM 1055 was designated on January 23, 1948, to run from FM 37 in Amherst to US 70 in Earth. On December 17, 1952, the road was extended north to the Lamb/Castro County Line. On July 25, 1963 (connecting section designated June 28), the road was extended north to US 385, replacing FM 1305. Part of what was FM 1305 was originally FM 2386.

== FM 1056 ==
Farm to Market Road 1056
- Location: Collingsworth County
- Length: 7.889 mi (12.696 km)
- Existed: May 23, 1951–present

Farm to Market Road 1056 (FM 1056) is located in Collingsworth County. It runs from FM 1547 east to FM 338.

FM 1056 was designated on May 23, 1951, to run from the end of Spur 143 in Quail north 5.1 miles (8.2 km) to a road intersection. On August 7, 1951, the road was extended south 1.0 mile (1.6 km) to SH 203, replacing Spur 143. On October 31, 1958, the road was extended north to FM 1036 (now FM 3143) and south and east to FM 338, replacing FM 1442. On June 1, 1966, the section north of then-FM 2166 was transferred to FM 1547 (along with FM 2166 itself).

=== FM 1056 (1948) ===
Farm to Market Road 1056
- Location: Castro County
- Existed: December 16, 1948–July 5, 1951

A previous route numbered FM 1056 was designated on December 16, 1948, from SH 86 at Nazareth northward 5.0 miles (8.0 km) to a road intersection. FM 1056 was cancelled on July 5, 1951, and became a portion of FM 168.

== FM 1057 ==
Farm to Market Road 1057
- Location: Deaf Smith and Castro counties
- Length: 37.307 mi (60.040 km)
- Existed: 1948–present

Farm to Market Road 1057 (FM 1057) is located in Deaf Smith and Castro counties. It runs from US 385 & FM 1062 west and south to SH 86.

FM 1057 was designated on December 16, 1948, to run from a road intersection (current FM 1055) east to a road intersection 2.6 miles (4.2 km) east of it. On December 17, 1952, the road was extended west and north to US 60. On September 27, 1960, the road was extended north to a road intersection 7.0 miles (11.3 km) north of FM 1058, replacing FM 2356. On August 31, 1966, the road was extended north and east to US 385 & FM 1062. On November 26, 1969, the section from east of US 385 west 14.1 miles (22.7 km) to FM 2397, and the road was rerouted south to SH 86, creating a concurrency with FM 2397.

== FM 1058 ==
Farm to Market Road 1058
- Location: Deaf Smith County
- Length: 36.322 mi (58.455 km)
- Existed: 1948–present

Farm to Market Road 1058 (FM 1058) is located in Deaf Smith County. It runs from US 385 and Loop 211 in Hereford west to the New Mexico state line, where it continues as New Mexico State Road 241.

FM 1058 was designated on December 16, 1948, along the current route; what is now US 385 was SH 51 at the time. The route was constructed along a roadway that had been graded c. 1920 to facilitate the movement of crops in the county to the rail line running through Hereford.

== FM 1059 ==
Farm to Market Road 1059
- Location: Hutchinson and Carson counties
- Length: 7.76 mi (12.49 km)
- Existed: 1948–present

Farm to Market Road 1059 (FM 1059) is located in Hutchinson and Carson counties. It runs from FM 280 to SH 152.

FM 1059 was designated on December 16, 1948, to run from FM 280 northeast of Texroy southeast 5.5 miles (8.9 km) to Standolind Camp. On May 5, 1966, the road was extended to SH 152.

== FM 1060 ==
Farm to Market Road 1060
- Location: Sherman and Moore counties
- Length: 20.697 mi (33.309 km)
- Existed: 1948–present

Farm to Market Road 1060 (FM 1060) is located in Sherman and Moore counties. It runs from FM 1573 east and south to SH 152.

FM 1060 was designated on December 16, 1948, to run from FM 281 south 7.0 miles (11.3 km) to a road intersection. On July 14, 1949, the road was extended south to SH 152. On December 17, 1952, the road was extended north and west to FM 1573.

== RM 1061 ==
Ranch to Market Road 1061
- Location: Potter and Oldham counties
- Length: 33.561 mi (54.011 km)
- Existed: December 16, 1948 (Note: RM 1061 was originally designated as FM 1061 from 1948 to 1955.)–present

Ranch to Market Road 1061 (RM 1061) is located in Potter and Oldham counties.

RM 1061 begins at an intersection with BL I-40 in Amarillo. The highway is known locally as Tascosa Road and runs northwest through the city, passing several subdivisions. RM 1061 leaves the city before having an interchange with Loop 335. The highway travels in a northwestern direction and turns to the west at Melfrank Road. RM 1061 runs along the southern boundary of Bishop Hills and turns back to the northwest near Ranch Road. After passing Ranch View Drive the highway runs through mainly rural areas of the county. RM 1061 intersects with RM 2381 north of Bushland. The highway runs through rural areas before ending at an intersection with US 385 in Tascosa.

RM 1061 was designated as Farm to Market Road 1061 (FM 1061) on December 16, 1948, running from US 66 (currently BL I-40) in Amarillo to a road intersection at a distance of approximately 10.2 miles (16.4 km). On September 21, 1955, the road was extended northwest 16.0 miles (25.7 km) to a point near Ady and was redesignated as RM 1061. RM 1061 was extended to Tascosa at SH 51 on November 21, 1956 (which became US 385 in 1959). On June 27, 1995, the section between Business I-40 and Loop 335 was redesignated Urban Road 1061 (UR 1061). The designation reverted to RM 1061 with the elimination of the Urban Road system on November 15, 2018.

Junction list

County	Location	mi	km	Destinations	Notes
Potter	Amarillo	0.0	0.0	I-40 BL (Amarillo Boulevard)	
Potter		2.9	4.7	Loop 335	Interchange
Potter		10.1	16.3	RM 2381 south – Bushland	
Oldham	Tascosa	33.5	53.9	US 385 – Vega, Boys Ranch	
1.000 mi = 1.609 km; 1.000 km = 0.621 mi

== FM 1062 ==
Farm to Market Road 1062
- Location: Deaf Smith and Randall counties
- Length: 23.375 mi (37.618 km)
- Existed: 1948–present

Farm to Market Road 1062 (FM 1062) is located in Deaf Smith and Randall counties. It runs from US 385 & FM 1057 east to US 60.

FM 1062 was designated on December 16, 1948, to run from US 60 west of Canyon west to the Randall/Deaf Smith County Line. On November 30, 1949, the road was extended west and south to US 60 in Dawn. On June 27, 1951, the 5.6 miles (9.0 km) north-south section became part of FM 809. On October 31, 1958, the road was extended west to US 385, replacing FM 2351.

== FM 1063 ==
Farm to Market Road 1063
- Location: Williamson County
- Length: 5.761 mi (9.271 km)
- Existed: July 27, 1964–present

Farm to Market Road 1063 (FM 1063) is located in Williamson County. It runs from FM 1331 in Hare south to US 79 east of Thrall.

FM 1063 was designated on July 10, 1964, on the current route, replacing a section of FM 1331, which was rerouted east.

=== FM 1063 (1948) ===
Farm to Market Road 1063
- Location: Crosby County
- Existed: December 16, 1948–November 1, 1960

A previous route numbered FM 1063 was designated on December 16, 1948, from US 62 at Cone, westward and southward to Farmer. On July 14, 1949, the road was extended west 1.0 mile (1.6 km) from Farmer to a road intersection and east 3.0 miles (4.8 km) from US 62 to a road intersection. On September 28, 1949, the road was extended west to FM 378. On December 17, 1952, the road was extended east to FM 651. On November 21, 1956, the road was extended east to FM 28. FM 1063 was cancelled on November 1, 1960, and became a portion of FM 193.

== FM 1064 ==
Farm to Market Road 1064
- Location: Dawson County
- Length: 3.834 mi (6.170 km)
- Existed: 1948–present

Farm to Market Road 1064 (FM 1064) is located in Dawson County. It runs from SH 137 near Punkin Center west to FM 829.

FM 1064 was designated on December 16, 1948, to run from US 180 north 4.3 miles (6.9 km) to Mungerville. On December 3, 1953, the road was extended at both ends: north 2.7 miles (4.3 km) to a road intersection, and south to FM 2051. On October 31, 1957, the road was extended east from its then-north end to SH 137. On October 7, 1960, the section from US 180 to FM 2051 became part of FM 1718, and on October 10, 1961, the section from US 180 east and north to the current end became part of FM 829, which also replaced FM 1718.

== FM 1065 ==
Farm to Market Road 1065
- Location: Briscoe and Floyd counties
- Length: 13.782 mi (22.180 km)
- Existed: 1948–present

Farm to Market Road 1065 (FM 1065) is located in Briscoe and Floyd counties. It runs from a county road south to FM 97.

FM 1065 was designated on December 16, 1948, to run from SH 86 south 6.5 miles (10.5 km) to a road intersection. On September 21, 1955, the road was extended north 3.6 miles (5.8 km) to another road intersection. On December 21, 1956, the road was extended south to FM 97.

== FM 1066 ==
Farm to Market Road 1066
- Location: Gaines and Dawson counties
- Length: 24.272 mi (39.062 km)
- Existed: 1948–present

Farm to Market Road 1066 (FM 1066) is located in Gaines and Dawson counties. It runs from FM 1067 east to US 87. It until recently continued west to FM 303 via what is now CR 120.

FM 1066 was designated on December 16, 1948, to run from SH 328 (now SH 83), south and east 7.0 miles (11.3 km) to a road intersection. On December 14, 1956, a section was transferred to FM 1312 (became FM 303 on February 10, 1966). On June 2, 1967, the road was extended east to SH 137, replacing FM 2054. On November 3, 1972, the road was extended east to US 87. On October 29, 2009, the section from FM 303 to FM 1067 was given to Gaines County.

== FM 1067 ==
Farm to Market Road 1067
- Location: Gaines County
- Length: 4.052 mi (6.521 km)
- Existed: 1948–present

Farm to Market Road 1067 (FM 1067) is located in Gaines County. It runs from SH 83 to FM 1066 north of Cedar Lake.

FM 1067 was designated on December 16, 1948, on the current route.

== FM 1068 ==
Farm to Market Road 1068
- Location: San Patricio County
- Length: 3.487 mi (5.612 km)
- Existed: October 31, 1958–present

Farm to Market Road 1068 (FM 1068) is located in San Patricio County. It runs from BS 359-B in Mathis to PR 25 at the Corpus Christi State Park.

FM 1068 was designated on October 31, 1958, on the current route.

=== FM 1068 (1948) ===
Farm to Market Road 1068
- Location: Garza County
- Existed: December 16, 1948–March 19, 1949

The first route numbered FM 1068 was designated on December 16, 1948, from US 84 westward 2.7 miles (4.3 km) to the Garza–Lynn county line. Three months later FM 1068 was cancelled and became a portion of FM 211.

=== FM 1068 (1951) ===
Farm to Market Road 1068
- Location: San Patricio County
- Existed: May 23, 1951–March 24, 1958

The second route numbered FM 1068 was designated on May 23, 1951, from US 181 at Taft eastward and northward 7.9 miles (12.7 km) to Plymouth Oil Field. FM 1068 was cancelled on March 24, 1958, and became a portion of FM 631.

== FM 1069 ==
Farm to Market Road 1069
- Location: Aransas and San Patricio counties
- Length: 21.088 mi (33.938 km)
- Existed: May 23, 1951–present

Farm to Market Road 1069 (FM 1069) is located in Aransas and San Patricio counties. It runs from Bus. SH 35 in Rockport to Redfish Bay at Port Ingelside.

FM 1069 was designated on May 23, 1951, from SH 35, 2 miles (3.2 km) west of Aransas Pass, north to the Aransas County line. On September 19, 1951, the road was extended northeast 3.2 miles (5.1 km) to FM 881 (now SH 188). On October 29, 1953, the road was extended southwest 9.7 miles (15.6 km) to FM 632 (now SH 361) at Ingleside. On November 20, 1953, the road was extended to Redfish Bay, creating a gap at FM 632 and replacing FM 2094. On November 24, 1959, the road was extended southeast 2.5 miles (4.0 km) to SH 35. On January 1, 1966, the gap at Ingleside was removed following a rerouting of FM 632. On December 22, 1992, a 1.1-mile (1.8 km) section from FM 881 to the then-new location of SH 35 was transferred to SH 188. On August 18, 1993, a 1.8-mile (2.9 km) section from then-new SH 35 to existing SH 35 was transferred to SH 188, while FM 1069 was rerouted over FM 881 to Bus. SH 35. On April 3, 2006, a section of FM 1069 in Rockport was redesignated as Loop 70.

=== FM 1069 (1948) ===
Farm to Market Road 1069
- Location: Hale County
- Existed: December 16, 1948–April 4, 1949

A previous route numbered FM 1069 was designated on December 16, 1948, from US 70, 2 miles (3.2 km) west of Halfway, south 9 miles (14 km) to a road intersection. Four months later FM 1069 was cancelled and became a portion of FM 594 (now FM 179).

== FM 1070 ==
Farm to Market Road 1070
- Location: Hale County
- Length: 0.996 mi (1,603 m)
- Existed: 1948–present

Farm to Market Road 1070 (FM 1070) is located in Hale County. It runs from US 70 & FM 179 in Halfway south to a road intersection.

FM 1070 was designated on December 16, 1948, to run from US 70 north 4.0 miles (6.4 km) to a road intersection. On March 27, 1958, the road was extended south 1.0 mile (1.6 km) to a road intersection. On May 6, 1964, the road was extended north to SH 194. On September 19, 1968, the section north of US 70 was transferred to FM 179.

== FM 1071 ==
Farm to Market Road 1071
- Location: Hale and Lamb counties
- Length: 16.261 mi (26.170 km)
- Existed: 1948–present

Farm to Market Road 1071 (FM 1071) is located in Hale and Lamb counties. It runs from FM 1424 east to FM 168.

FM 1071 was designated on November 23, 1948, to run from FM 1069 (later FM 594, now FM 179) south of US 70 west 2.0 miles (3.2 km) to a road intersection. On June 28, 1963, the road was extended east to FM 1424, creating a concurrency with FM 594 (now FM 179). On November 25, 1975, the road was extended west to FM 168.

== FM 1072 ==
Farm to Market Road 1072
- Location: Lamb County
- Length: 23.483 mi (37.792 km)
- Existed: 1948–present

Farm to Market Road 1072 (FM 1072) is located in Lamb County. It runs from US 70 near Circle to US 84 near Bainer.

FM 1072 was designated on November 23, 1948, to run from Fieldton south 3.7 miles (6.0 km) to the end of the pavement. On November 20, 1951, the road was extended south to FM 54. On December 11, 1952, the road was extended east from Fieldton to FM 304 (now FM 168). On June 28, 1963, the road was extended south to US 84. On September 19, 1968, the section east of Fieldton was transferred to FM 37, and the road was rerouted north to US 70, replacing a section of FM 1842.

== FM 1073 ==
Farm to Market Road 1073
- Location: Freestone County
- Length: 0.908 mi (1,461 m)
- Existed: August 23, 1968–present

Farm to Market Road 1073 (FM 1073) is located in Freestone County. It runs from SH 75 south of Streetman east to a sulphur plant.

FM 1073 was designated on August 23, 1968, on the current route.

=== FM 1073 (1948) ===
Farm to Market Road 1073
- Location: Lubbock and Lynn counties
- Existed: December 16, 1948–August 20, 1964

A previous route numbered FM 1073 was designated on December 16, 1948, from US 84 at Shallowater southward 4.3 miles (6.9 km) to a road intersection. On July 14, 1949, the road was extended south 4.0 miles (6.4 km) to SH 290 (now SH 114). On October 28, 1953, the road was extended south to US 62. On October 14, 1954, the road was extended south to the Lubbock–Lynn county line, replacing FM 1316. Twelve days later, the road was extended south to FM 211. On May 2, 1962, the road was extended south to FM 1317. FM 1073 was cancelled on August 20, 1964, and became a portion of FM 179.

== FM 1074 ==
Farm to Market Road 1074
- Location: San Patricio County
- Length: 12.604 mi (20.284 km)
- Existed: May 23, 1951–present

Farm to Market Road 1074 (FM 1074) is located in San Patricio County. It runs from US 181 southeast of Sinton south and east to FM 893 west of Portland.

FM 1074 was designated on May 23, 1951, to run from FM 631 east of Sodville south and east 5.5 miles (8.9 km) to a road intersection. On December 18, 1951, the road was extended east to FM 893. On November 21, 1956, the road was extended north to US 181.

=== FM 1074 (1948) ===
Farm to Market Road 1074
- Location: Lynn County
- Existed: December 16, 1948–March 19, 1949

A previous route numbered FM 1074 was designated on December 16, 1948, in Lynn County, from US 87 north of Tahoka northeastward 15.7 miles (25.3 km) via Wilson to the Lubbock County line. FM 1074 was cancelled on March 19, 1949, and became a portion of FM 400.

== FM 1075 ==
Farm to Market Road 1075
- Location: Castro, Swisher, Randall, and Armstrong counties
- Length: 38.224 mi (61.516 km)
- Existed: 1948–present

Farm to Market Road 1075 (FM 1075) is located in Castro, Swisher, Randall, and Armstrong counties. It runs from the end of pavement east to FM 2301.

FM 1075 was designated on December 16, 1948, to run from US 87 (now Northern Avenue) in Happy south and west 4.0 miles (6.4 km) to a road intersection. On July 14, 1949, the road was extended south 3.0 miles (4.8 km) to another road intersection. On May 23, 1941, the road was extended west 4.0 miles (6.4 km) to a road intersection near the Swisher/Castro County Line. On March 28, 1952, the road was extended west to FM 168 and replaced a section of that road to Arney School. On September 21, 1955, the road was extended west 3.0 miles (4.8 km) to its current west end. On July 11, 1968, the road was extended east 9.7 miles (15.6 km) from US 87 to a road intersection, creating a concurrency which was later removed. On October 26, 1983, the road was extended east to FM 2301, replacing FM 3358.

== FM 1076 ==
Farm to Market Road 1076
- Location: Terry County
- Length: 5.982 mi (9.627 km)
- Existed: 1948–present

Farm to Market Road 1076 (FM 1076) is located in Terry County. It runs from SH 137 east to FM 168.

FM 1076 was designated on November 23, 1948, to run from SH 137 east 2.5 miles (4.0 km) to Union School. On June 28, 1963, the road was extended east to a road intersection; the intersecting road became part of FM 168 on May 25, 1976.

== RM 1077 ==
Ranch to Market Road 1077
- Location: Bandera County
- Length: 8.087 mi (13.015 km)
- Existed: June 2, 1967–present

Ranch to Market Road 1077 (RM 1077) is located in Bandera County.

RM 1077 begins at Bandera Creek Road approximately 1.4 miles (2.3 km) northeast of the Hill Country State Natural Area. The highway travels in a northeast direction for most of its length before ending at an intersection with SH 173 just south of Bandera.

RM 1077 was designated on June 2, 1967, running from FM 689 to a point southwest at a distance of about 4.5 miles (7.2 km). The highway was extended another 3.7 miles (6.0 km) on July 11, 1968. An extension of RM 1077 to the Hill Country SNA was proposed on August 28, 1989, but was cancelled on September 25, 2003, as the county could not secure right of way.

=== FM 1077 (1948) ===
Farm to Market Road 1077
- Location: Yoakum County
- Existed: December 16, 1948–September 26, 1963

A previous route numbered FM 1077 was designated on December 16, 1948, running from the New Mexico state line to US 380 in Plains. On March 30, 1955, the road was signed, but not designated, as SH 337 to match New Mexico Highway 337. The highway was cancelled on September 26, 1963, with the mileage being transferred to US 82, which also replaced New Mexico Highway 337.

== FM 1078 ==
Farm to Market Road 1078
- Location: Orange County
- Length: 3.224 mi (5.189 km)
- Existed: April 27, 1955–present

Farm to Market Road 1078 (FM 1078) is located in Orange County. It runs from SH 62 northwest of Peveto northeast to FM 1130.

FM 1078 was designated on April 27, 1955, on the current route, replacing part of SH 62 (which replaced a section of FM 406 south of there, and later extended replacing the remainder) from the new route to the old route (now Womack Road) and part of FM 406 from the old route of SH 62 to FM 1130.

=== FM 1078 (1948) ===
Farm to Market Road 1078
- Location: Callahan County
- Existed: December 16, 1948–July 11, 1951

The first route numbered FM 1078 was designated on December 16, 1948, from US 80 in Clyde southward 4.3 miles (6.9 km) to a road intersection. On July 14, 1949, the road was extended south 4.0 miles (6.4 km) to another road intersection. On May 23, 1951, the road was extended south to SH 36. FM 1078 was cancelled on July 11, 1951, and transferred to FM 604.

=== FM 1078 (1951) ===
Farm to Market Road 1078
- Location: Hays County
- Existed: July 25, 1951–October 27, 1952

The second route numbered FM 1078 was designated on July 25, 1951, from US 81 (now I-35) in Kyle northwest 8.9 miles (14.3 km) to a road intersection in Hays City. The road FM 1078 ended at the west end became part of FM 966 on November 20, 1951. FM 1078 was cancelled on October 27, 1952, and was transferred to FM 150 (now RM 150); note that FM 150 replaced FM 966 on May 25, 1955.

=== FM 1078 (1952) ===
Farm to Market Road 1078
- Location: Denton County
- Existed: December 17, 1952–January 6, 1955

The third route numbered FM 1078 was designated on December 17, 1952, from US 77 near Lewisville west to FM 1830 in Bartonville. FM 1078 was cancelled on January 6, 1955, and became a portion of FM 407.

== FM 1079 ==
Farm to Market Road 1079
- Location: Callahan County
- Length: 0.597 mi (961 m)
- Existed: December 16, 1948–present

Farm to Market Road 1079 (FM 1079) is located in Callahan County. It runs from FM 880 west to Cotton Wood.

FM 1079 was designated on December 16, 1948, from US 80 in Putnam southward 5.5 miles (8.9 km) to a road intersection. On July 14, 1949, the road was extended south 4.5 miles (7.2 km) to another road intersection. On May 23, 1951, the road was extended south to FM 880 at Cotton Wood. On September 5, 1951, this routing of FM 1079 became a portion of FM 880, while FM 1079 was reassigned to the old route of FM 880.

== FM 1080 ==
Farm to Market Road 1080
- Location: Haskell County
- Length: 5.42 mi (8.72 km)
- Existed: 1948–present

Farm to Market Road 1080 (FM 1080) is located in Haskell County. It runs from US 277 northeast of Haskell east to FM 266.

FM 1080 was designated on December 16, 1948, to run from US 277 east to Vontress. On May 23, 1951, the road extended east and south 4.0 miles (6.4 km) to a road intersection. On December 17, 1952, the road extended to SH 24 (now US 380). On May 24, 1962, north-south section became part of FM 266

== FM 1081 ==
Farm to Market Road 1081
- Location: Dickens and Kent counties
- Length: 23.934 mi (38.518 km)
- Existed: January 22, 1957–present

Farm to Market Road 1081 (FM 1081) is located in Dickens and Kent counties.

FM 1081 was designated on January 22, 1957, to run from FM 261 south 7.2 miles (11.6 km) to near Red Mud Creek. On May 6, 1964, the road was extended south 6.0 miles (9.7 km). On June 10, 1965, the road was extended south to SH 24 (now US 380), replacing FM 2747. On July 29, 1993, the road was extended north to FM 836.

=== FM 1081 (1948) ===
Farm to Market Road 1081
- Location: Haskell County
- Existed: December 16, 1948–August 5, 1955

A previous route numbered FM 1081 was designated on December 16, 1948, from SH 24 (now US 380) at Rule northwest to Jud. On May 23, 1951, the road was extended northeast to SH 283 (now SH 6) in Rochester. FM 1081 was cancelled on August 5, 1955, and became a portion of FM 617.

== FM 1082 ==
Farm to Market Road 1082
- Location: Jones and Taylor counties
- Length: 19.39 mi (31.21 km)
- Existed: 1948–present

Farm to Market Road 1082 (FM 1082) is located in Jones and Taylor counties. It runs from US 83 in Hawley east and south to SH 351.

FM 1082 was designated on December 16, 1948, to run from US 83 at Hawley southeast 5.0 miles (8.0 km) to a county road. On November 20, 1951, the road was extended to SH 351, replacing FM 1233.

== FM 1083 ==
Farm to Market Road 1083
- Location: Kent County
- Length: 7.7 mi (12.4 km)
- Existed: 1948–present

Farm to Market Road 1083 (FM 1083) is located in Kent County. It runs from SH 70 west and south to US 380 & SH 70.

FM 1083 was designated on December 16, 1948, to run from SH 70 in Jayton southwest 3.7 miles (6.0 km) to a road intersection. On November 26, 1969, the road was extended south to US 380 & SH 70.

== FM 1084 ==
Farm to Market Road 1084
- Location: Shackelford County
- Length: 6.958 mi (11.198 km)
- Existed: 1948–present

Farm to Market Road 1084 (FM 1084) is located in Shackelford County. It runs from US 180 in Albany northwest 7.0 miles (11.3 km).

FM 1084 was designated on December 16, 1948, on the current route.

== FM 1085 ==
Farm to Market Road 1085
- Location: Fisher, Jones, and Taylor counties
- Length: 34.905 mi (56.174 km)
- Existed: 1948–present

Farm to Market Road 1085 (FM 1085) is located in Fisher, Jones, and Taylor counties. It runs from US 180 southeast through Trent to FM 126.

FM 1085 was designated on December 16, 1948, to run from a road intersection 2.7 miles (4.3 km) north of US 80 (now Bus. I-20) in Trent south to a road intersection 2.5 miles (4.0 km) south of Trent. On October 28, 1953, the road was extended north to FM 57, replacing FM 1833. On July 28, 1955, the road was extended northwest to US 180. On November 21, 1956, the road was extended southeast to FM 126, but this extension was modified to intersect FM 126 at a different spot on October 31, 1957.

== FM 1086 ==
Farm to Market Road 1086
- Location: Taylor County
- Length: 16.927 mi (27.241 km)
- Existed: 1948–present

Farm to Market Road 1086 (FM 1086) is located in Taylor County. It runs from Shep southeast to US 83 in Bradshaw.

FM 1086 was designated on December 16, 1948, to run from US 277 northwest to Shep. On January 21, 1955, the road was extended southeast to US 83 in Bradshaw, replacing FM 2046 and creating a concurrency with US 277.

== FM 1087 ==
Farm to Market Road 1087
- Location: Nacogdoches County
- Length: 10.944 mi (17.613 km)
- Existed: 1948–present

Farm to Market Road 1087 (FM 1087) is located in Nacogdoches County. It runs from SH 26 (now US 259) to FM 95 near Garrison.

FM 1087 was designated on December 16, 1948, on the current route.

== FM 1088 ==
Farm to Market Road 1088
- Location: Hudspeth County
- Length: 0.71 mi (1,140 m)
- Existed: September 5, 1973–present

Farm to Market Road 1088 (FM 1088) is located in Hudspeth County. It runs from SH 20 southwestward to the Fort Hancock–El Porvenir International Bridge, where it crosses the Rio Grande to El Porvenir, Chihuahua, Mexico. The road and bridge provide a connection with Mexico Federal Highway 2.

FM 1088 was assigned its current northern terminus along SH 20 on September 5, 1973. In 2002, its southern terminus was moved approximately 0.16 miles (0.26 km) northeast to the new Port of Entry.

=== FM 1088 (1948) ===
Farm to Market Road 1088
- Location: Austin County
- Existed: December 16, 1948–December 7, 1972

A previous route numbered FM 1088 was designated on December 16, 1948, from SH 36, 1 mile (1.6 km) west of Peters, to Cat Springs in Austin County. On September 21, 1955, the road was extended 2 miles (3.2 km) southwest to the San Bernard River at the Colorado County line. FM 1088 was cancelled on December 7, 1972, and became a portion of FM 949.

== FM 1089 ==
Farm to Market Road 1089
- Location: Smith and Cherokee counties
- Length: 0.879 mi (1,415 m)
- Existed: October 25, 1969–present

Farm to Market Road 1089 (FM 1089) is located in Smith and Cherokee counties. It runs from SH 110 east to FM 13 in Troup. It is locally known as Wilkinson Drive.

FM 1089 was designated on October 25, 1969, on the current route.

=== FM 1089 (1948) ===
Farm to Market Road 1089
- Location: Brazoria County
- Existed: December 16, 1948–June 9, 1958

A previous route numbered FM 1089 was designated on December 16, 1948, from SH 35 at Old Ocean north to West Columbia/Pledger Road (later FM 1452, now FM 1301). FM 1089 was cancelled on June 9, 1958, and became a portion of FM 524.

== FM 1090 ==
Farm to Market Road 1090
- Location: Victoria and Calhoun counties
- Length: 17.707 mi (28.497 km)
- Existed: May 23, 1955–present

Farm to Market Road 1090 (FM 1090) is located in Victoria and Calhoun counties. It runs from US 87 southeast of Placedo, eastward, southeastward, southwestward, and northwestward to US 87 in Port Lavaca.

FM 1090 was designated on May 23, 1955, to run from SH 35 (now US 87) in Port Lavaca northwest to the Calhoun/Victoria County Line, replacing a section of FM 234 (which had its unbuilt section from the county line to FM 616 cancelled). On November 24, 1959, a section from SH 238 south 1.9 miles (3.1 km) to a county road was added, creating a gap of three blocks. On September 27, 1960, the road was extended west and northwest 2.2 miles (3.5 km) to another point on SH 238. On November 26, 1969, the road was extended northwest from SH 238 to another point on US 87 in Port Lavaca. On September 29, 1977, the gap was closed. On February 25, 1992, the road was extended northwest and southwest Calhoun/Victoria County Line to US 87.

=== FM 1090 (1948) ===
Farm to Market Road 1090
- Location: Matagorda and Brazoria counties
- Existed: December 16, 1948–January 16, 1953

A previous route numbered FM 1090 was designated on December 16, 1948, from FM 524 at Four Corners southwest to FM 457 at Cedar Lane. FM 1090 was cancelled on January 16, 1953, and transferred to FM 521.

== FM 1091 ==
Farm to Market Road 1091
- Location: Live Oak County
- Length: 1.981 mi (3.188 km)
- Existed: May 23, 1951–present

Farm to Market Road 1091 (FM 1091) is located in Live Oak County. It runs from FM 99 east of Whitsett east to a road intersection.

FM 1091 was designated on May 23, 1951 on the current route.

=== FM 1091 (1948) ===
Farm to Market Road 1091
- Location: Brazoria County
- Existed: December 16, 1948–July 22, 1949

A previous route numbered FM 1091 was designated on December 16, 1948, from SH 35 in Angleton to the north end of the Bastrop Bayou Bridge. Seven months later FM 1091 was cancelled and became a portion of FM 523.

== FM 1092 ==
Farm to Market Road 1092
- Location: Harris and Fort Bend counties
- Length: 5.977 mi (9.619 km)
- Existed: December 16, 1948–present

Farm to Market Road 1092 (FM 1092) is located in Harris and Fort Bend counties. Known locally as Murphy Road, it runs from SH 6 in Missouri City north to I-69/US 59 in Houston.

== FM 1093 ==
Farm to Market Road 1093
- Location: Colorado, Wharton, Austin, Fort Bend, and Harris counties
- Length: 50.476 mi (81.233 km)
- Existed: December 16, 1948–present

Farm to Market Road 1093 (FM 1093) is located in Colorado, Wharton, Austin, Fort Bend and Harris counties. It runs from FM 3013 in Eagle Lake to I-610 in Houston.

FM 1093 serves as the free frontage roads for the Westpark Tollway from the tollway's western terminus to its interchange with FM 1464 in Clodine. Beyond this interchange, FM 1093 continues along Westheimer Road to its terminus at I-610 near The Galleria shopping mall.

FM 1093 was designated on December 16, 1948, from FM 359 at Flewellen via Gaston to Post Oak Road west of Houston. On July 9, 1951, the road was extended west 11.8 miles (19.0 km) to SH 36 at Wallis, replacing FM 1094 and creating a concurrency with FM 359. On September 29, 1954, the road was extended 11.2 miles (18.0 km) west to US 90 Alt. at Eagle Lake, replacing FM 1597 and creating a concurrency with SH 36. On July 11, 1962, the road was extended 0.2 miles (0.32 km) east to I-610. On January 25, 1971, the road was shortened to end at FM 3013, as a 0.6-mile (0.97 km) section from US 90 Alt. to FM 3013 was transferred to FM 3013. On June 27, 1995, the section between SH 99 and I-610 was redesignated Urban Road 1093 (UR 1093). The designation of this section reverted to FM 1093 with the elimination of the Urban Road system on November 15, 2018.

Junction list

County	Location	mi	km	Destinations	Notes
Colorado	Eagle Lake	0.0	0.0	FM 3013	Western terminus of FM 1093
Colorado	Chesterville	6.7	10.8	FM 2764 south – Lissie	Northern terminus of FM 2764
Wharton	No major junctions				
Austin	Wallis	15.0	24.1	SH 36 north – Sealy	West end of SH 36 concurrency
Austin	Wallis	15.5	24.9	SH 60 south – East Bernard	Northern terminus of SH 60
Austin	Wallis	15.6	25.1	SH 36 south – Rosenberg	East end of SH 36 concurrency
Austin		17.5	28.2	FM 1458 north – San Felipe	Southern terminus of FM 1458
Fort Bend	Simonton	22.3	35.9	FM 1489 north (Simonton Road) – Brookshire	West end of FM 1489 concurrency
Fort Bend	Simonton	22.3	35.9	FM 1489 south (Simonton Road) – Orchard	East end of FM 1489 concurrency
Fort Bend	Fulshear	27.0	43.5	FM 359 north (Main Street) – Brookshire	West end of FM 359 concurrency
Fort Bend		30.3	48.8	FM 359 south / FM 1463 north – Richmond, Katy	East end of FM 359 concurrency
Fort Bend		31.8	51.2	Westpark Tollway	Tollway begins; FM 1093 becomes frontage roads for tollway
Fort Bend		32.3	52.0	FM 723 south (Spring Green Road) – Rosenberg	Northern terminus of FM 723
Fort Bend		34.5	55.5	SH 99 (Grand Parkway)	
Fort Bend	Houston	39.7	63.9	To Westpark Tollway	FM 1093 splits from Tollway
Fort Bend	Houston	39.9	64.2	FM 1464 south (Clodine Road) – New Territory	Northern terminus of FM 1464
Harris	Houston	43.1	69.4	SH 6 – Sugar Land	Former FM 1960
Harris	Houston	48.4	77.9	Beltway 8 (Frontage Road) / Sam Houston Tollway	
Harris	Houston	54.4	87.5	I-610 (West Loop Freeway)	I-610 exit 8C; eastern terminus of FM 1093
1.000 mi = 1.609 km; 1.000 km = 0.621 mi: Concurrency terminus; Tolled

== FM 1094 ==
Farm to Market Road 1094
- Location: Austin County
- Length: 22.226 mi (35.769 km)
- Existed: July 25, 1951–present

Farm to Market Road 1094 (FM 1094) is located in Austin County. It runs from FM 109 at New Ulm southeast to SH 36 at Sealy.

FM 1094 was designated on July 25, 1951, from FM 109 at New Ulm to a point 8.6 miles (13.8 km) east. On November 20, 1951, the road was extended 3.1 miles (5.0 km) to FM 1088 (now FM 949). On September 29, 1954, the road was extended 11.4 miles (18.3 km) to SH 36 at Sealy, replacing FM 2142.

=== FM 1094 (1948) ===
Farm to Market Road 1094
- Location: Austin and Fort Bend counties
- Existed: December 16, 1948–July 9, 1951

A previous route numbered FM 1094 was designated on December 16, 1948, from FM 359 at Fulshear to Simonton. On July 22, 1949, the road was extended southwest 6.9 miles (11.1 km) to SH 36 at Wallis. FM 1094 was cancelled on July 9, 1951, and became a portion of FM 1093.

== FM 1095 ==
Farm to Market Road 1095
- Location: Matagorda County
- Length: 15.516 mi (24.971 km)
- Existed: 1948–present

Farm to Market Road 1095 (FM 1095) is located in Matagorda County. It runs from SH 35 east of Blessing to Collegeport.

FM 1095 was designated on December 16, 1948, from SH 35, 5 miles (8.0 km) east of Blessing southward 11.5 miles (18.5 km) to a road intersection west of Citrus Grove. On July 22, 1949, FM 1095 was extended south and west 4.8 miles (7.7 km) to Collegeport.

== FM 1096 ==
Farm to Market Road 1096
- Location: Wharton County
- Length: 7.272 mi (11.703 km)
- Existed: July 28, 1955–present

Farm to Market Road 1096 (FM 1096) is located in Wharton County.

FM 1096 begins as a two-lane road on FM 442 northeast of Lane City. From there, FM 1096 goes north-northeast 1.8 miles (2.9 km) to its intersection with FM 3012. It turns east-southeast for 1.0 mile (1.6 km), then curves back to the north-northeast again for 2.0 miles (3.2 km) to its intersection with FM 1301 in Iago. The road crosses Caney Creek approximately 300 yards (274 m) south of Iago. Also known as North Iago Road, the highway continues north-northeast 2.5 miles (4.0 km) to Barker Cutoff. North Iago Road extends past Barker Cutoff in the same direction to intersect with County Road 160 (CR 160) and CR 153 before coming to a dead end short of the San Bernard River.

On July 28, 1955, FM 1096 was established from FM 1301 at Iago in Wharton County southwest to FM 442. The length was about five miles (8.0 km). A new segment 2.5 miles (4.0 km) in length was added on June 28, 1963. This portion started from FM 1301 at Iago and extended about 2.5 miles (4.0 km) northeast to a road intersection.

Junction list

The entire highway is in Wharton County.

Location	mi	km	Destinations	Notes
	0.0	0.0	FM 442 – Lane City, Boling	Southern terminus of FM 1096
	1.8	2.9	FM 3012 – Wharton	Southern terminus of FM 3012
Boling-Iago	4.8	7.7	FM 1301 – Pledger, Wharton	
	7.3	11.7	Barker Cutoff	Northern terminus of FM 1096
1.000 mi = 1.609 km; 1.000 km = 0.621 mi

=== FM 1096 (1948) ===
Farm to Market Road 1096
- Location: Matagorda County
- Existed: December 16, 1948–October 15, 1954

A previous route numbered FM 1096 was designated on December 16, 1948, from SH 60 at Wadsworth west 2.5 miles (4.0 km) to a county road. FM 1096 was extended west to FM 1095 and FM 460 on September 29, 1954. FM 1096 was cancelled on October 15, 1954, and became a portion of FM 521.

== FM 1097 ==
Farm to Market Road 1097
- Location: Walker and Montgomery counties
- Length: 30.222 mi (48.638 km)
- Existed: 1948–present

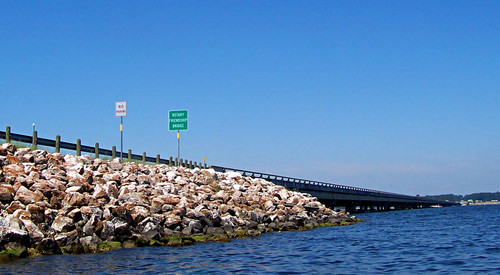
FM 1097 crosses Lake Conroe on the Rotary Friendship Bridge

Farm to Market Road 1097 (FM 1097) is located in Walker and Montgomery counties. FM 1097 originally began at FM 149 in Montgomery, and ends nearly 30 miles (48 km) away at SH 150. Most of the road has only two lanes each direction. The speed limit ranges from 60 mph (97 km/h) to 35 mph (56 km/h). There are very few traffic lights on the highway.

FM 1097 was first designated on December 16, 1948. The highway traveled from an intersection with FM 149 north of Montgomery along its present route to an intersection with U.S. Route 75 in Willis. On July 22 of the next year, the designation was extended 8.9 miles (14.3 km) to the Walker County border. The road was extended 1.2 miles (1.9 km) eastward, to the highway's present eastern terminus, on November 20, 1951. On May 2, 1962, the highway was extended 6.9 miles (11.1 km) northwestward to its present northern terminus.

Junction list

County	Location	mi	km	Destinations	Notes
Montgomery		0.000	0.000	CR 3142 (Johnson Road)	Western terminus
Montgomery		6.243	10.047	FM 149 (North Liberty Street)	Northern terminus of FM 149 concurrency
Montgomery	Montgomery	6.744	10.853	FM 149 (North Liberty Street)	Southern terminus of FM 149 concurrency
Montgomery	Lake Conroe	13.206– 14.471	21.253– 23.289	Rotary Friendship Bridge	
Montgomery	Willis	20.471– 20.513	32.945– 33.012	I-45	I-45 exit 94
Montgomery	Willis	21.274– 21.349	34.237– 34.358	SH 75 (Danville Street)	Short concurrency through central Willis
Walker		30.222	48.638	SH 150	Eastern terminus
1.000 mi = 1.609 km; 1.000 km = 0.621 mi: Concurrency terminus

== FM 1098 ==
Farm to Market Road 1098
- Location: Waller County
- Length: 4.389 mi (7.063 km)
- Existed: December 16, 1948–present

Farm to Market Road 1098 (FM 1098) is located in Waller County. It runs from FM 1488 northeast of Hempstead south to US 290 in Prairie View.

FM 1098 was designated on December 16, 1948, from Spur 96 (former SH 244) at Prairie View College north 9.7 miles (15.6 km) to a road intersection. On June 8, 1949, the route was shortened 1.7 miles (2.7 km) to end at a county road intersection at Field's Store School. On July 9, 1951, the road was extended to US 290 southeast of Hempstead, replacing a portion of Spur 96. On November 20, 1951, the road was extended 6.3 miles (10.1 km) north to the Grimes County line. On January 16, 1953, a 12.3-mile (19.8 km) section of FM 1098 was transferred to FM 362 and FM 1488, while a loop connection of FM 1098 was added around Prairie View College, replacing Loop 96. On September 29, 1976, the road was rerouted around the west side of Prairie View A&M College over the loop connection and the section through campus was removed from the highway system.

== FM 1099 ==
Farm to Market Road 1099
- Location: Atascosa County
- Length: 7.67 mi (12.34 km)
- Existed: 1948–present

Farm to Market Road 1099 (FM 1099) is located in Atascosa County. Its western terminus at US 281 Alt. near Campbellton. The route runs to the east, crossing I-37/US 281 at exit 88, before turning to the southeast and ending at FM 99 near Peggy.

FM 1099 was designated on December 16, 1948, from what was then US 281 eastward 5.7 miles (9.2 km) toward Fashing. The designation was extended 2 miles (3.2 km) to FM 99 on September 19, 1951.
