= U.S. Route 281 Alternate =

U.S. Route 281 Alternate may refer to:

- U.S. Route 281 Alternate (Texas), an alternate route of U.S. Route 281 in South Texas
- U.S. Route 281 Alternate (Kansas), a former alternate route of U.S. Route 281 in Great Bend, Kansas
