= Santa Elena, Texas =

Santa Elena
- Unincorporated community
- Location within the state of Texas Santa Elena (the United States)
- Coordinates: 26°45′36″N 98°29′11″W
- Country: United States
- State: Texas
- County: Starr
- Time zone: UTC-6 (Central (CST))
  - Summer (DST): UTC-5 (CDT)
- ZIP codes: 78591
- GNIS feature ID: 1379030

Santa Elena is an unincorporated community in Starr County, Texas, United States. It is situated along FM 755 in northeastern Starr County, approximately six miles northwest of San Isidro. According to the Handbook of Texas, the community had an estimated population of 64 in 2000.

The community was established in the late 19th century. The population peaked at approximately 200 in the early 1930s. Today, Santa Elena is a small, dispersed rural community.

Santa Elena has a post office, with the ZIP code 78591. Public education in the community is provided by the San Isidro Independent School District.
