= Santa Catarina, Texas =

Santa Catarina
- Unincorporated community
- Location within the state of Texas Santa Catarina (the United States)
- Coordinates: 26°39′19″N 98°34′39″W
- Country: United States
- State: Texas
- County: Starr
- Time zone: UTC-6 (Central (CST))
  - Summer (DST): UTC-5 (CDT)
- GNIS feature ID: 1379027

Santa Catarina is an unincorporated community in Starr County, Texas, United States. It is situated along FM 755 in northeastern Starr County, approximately 20 miles northeast of Rio Grande City and six miles southwest of La Gloria. According to the Handbook of Texas, the community had an estimated population of 15 in 2000.

== Education ==
Public education in the community of Santa Catarina is provided by the San Isidro Independent School District.
