= U.S. Route 281 Alternate (Texas) =

Auxiliary U.S. Highway in Live Oak and Atascosa counties in Texas, United States

Alternate U.S. Highway 281
- Alt. US 281 highlighted in red

Route information
- Auxiliary route of US 281
- Maintained by TxDOT
- Length: 16.719 mi (26.907 km)
- Existed: 1982–present

Major junctions
- South end: I-37 / US 281 near Whitsett
- North end: I-37 / US 281 near Campbellton

Location
- Country: United States
- State: Texas

Highway system
- United States Numbered Highway System; List; Special; Divided; Highways in Texas; Interstate; US; State; Former; Toll; Loops; Spurs; FM/RM; Park; Rec
← US 281	→ US 283

Alternate U.S. Highway 281 (Alt. US 281) is a loop of the U.S. Highway System. The highway serves the small communities of Whitsett and Campbellton, about 45 miles (72 km) southeast of San Antonio in the state of Texas.

== Route description ==
Alt. US 281 begins at an interchange with Interstate 37/US 281 (I-37/US 281) about six miles (9.7 km) southeast of Whitsett; the same interchange also provides access to Farm to Market Road 2049 (FM 2049). The highway enters the town and crosses FM 99 before leaving. Just north of Whitsett, the highway turns from a northwesterly direction to a more northward one. The highway passes by many farms before entering Atascosa County. After the intersection with FM 1099, the highway enters Campbellton. Alt. US 281 is concurrent with FM 791 through the town before separating just north of the city limits. About a mile to the north of here, the highway crosses FM 140. Alt. US 281 reaches its northern terminus at another interchange with I-37/US 281 about 2 1/2 miles (4.0 km) north of Campbellton.

== History ==
The highway was created in 1982 when US 281 was re-rerouted a few miles to the east onto Interstate 37. The old alignment of US 281 through Whitsett and Campbellton was then resigned as Alt. US 281.

== Major intersections ==
County	Location	mi	km	Destinations	Notes
Live Oak		0.0	0.0	I-37 / US 281 / FM 2049 south – San Antonio, Corpus Christi, Rio Grande Valley	I-37 exit 76
Live Oak	Whitsett	5.9	9.5	FM 99 to SH 72 – Karnes City	
Atascosa		13.0	20.9	FM 1099 east to I-37 / FM 99	
Atascosa	Campbellton	14.0	22.5	FM 791 east – Falls City	Southern end of FM 791 concurrency
Atascosa		14.4	23.2	FM 791 west to SH 16	Northern end of FM 791 concurrency
Atascosa		15.2	24.5	FM 140 west	
Atascosa		16.2	26.1	I-37 north / US 281 north	I-37 exit 92
1.000 mi = 1.609 km; 1.000 km = 0.621 mi: Concurrency terminus

== See also ==
- List of U.S. Highways in Texas
