= San Isidro High School =

Location
- 5175 FM 1017; San Isidro, Texas 78588; United States
- Coordinates: 26.7172°N 98.4545°W

Information
- School type: Public high school
- School district: San Isidro Independent School District
- District Principal: lorie Moore
- Teaching staff: 7.24 (FTE)
- Grades: 9-12
- Enrollment: 67 (2023-2024)
- Student to teacher ratio: 9.25
- Colors: Blue, Gold & White
- Athletics conference: UIL Conference A
- Mascot: Tiger
- Website: San Isidro High School

San Isidro High School is a public high school located in the unincorporated community of San Isidro, Texas, USA and classified as a 1A school by the UIL. It is a part of the San Isidro Independent School District located in extreme northeastern Starr County. In 2015, the school was rated "Met Standard" by the Texas Education Agency.

== Academics ==
=== State Titles ===
- UIL Academic Meet Champions -
  - 1991(1A)
- UIL Calculator Applications -
  - 1992(1A), 2008(1A)
- UIL Number Sense -
  - 1991(1A)
- UIL Social Studies -
  - 2008(1A), 2010(1A)
- UIL Spelling & Vocabulary -
  - 1993(1A), 1994(1A), 1996(1A)
- UIL Journalism -
  - 2017 (2A), 2019 (2A)

== Athletics ==
The San Isidro Tigers compete in these sports -

Basketball, Cross Country, Track & Field, and Volleyball
