= William Dabney =

William Dabney may refer to:

- William C. Dabney (1894–1963), American industrialist
- William G. Dabney (1924–2018), African-American World War II soldier awarded the Legion of Honor
- William H. Dabney (1934–2012), American Vietnam War officer

== See also ==
- Dabney (disambiguation)
