= La Reforma, Texas =

La Reforma
- Unincorporated community
- Location within the state of Texas La Reforma (the United States)
- Coordinates: 26°41′08″N 98°22′28″W
- Country: United States
- State: Texas
- County: Starr
- Time zone: UTC-6 (Central (CST))
  - Summer (DST): UTC-5 (CDT)
- GNIS feature ID: 1339397

La Reforma is an unincorporated community in Starr County, Texas, United States. It is situated along FM 1017 in northeastern Starr County. According to the Handbook of Texas, the community had an estimated population of 45 in 2000.

== Education ==
Public education in the community of La Reforma is provided by the San Isidro Independent School District.
