= Delmita, Texas =

Delmita
- Census-designated place
- Location within the state of Texas
- Coordinates: 26°41′7″N 98°25′23″W
- Country: United States
- State: Texas
- County: Starr

Area
  - Total: 3.1 sq mi (8.0 km^{2})
  - Land: 3.1 sq mi (8.0 km^{2})
  - Water: 0.0 sq mi (0 km^{2})
- Elevation: 272 ft (83 m)

Population (2020)
  - Total: 186
  - Density: 60/sq mi (23/km^{2})
- Time zone: UTC-6 (Central (CST))
  - Summer (DST): UTC-5 (CDT)
- ZIP codes: 78536
- GNIS feature ID: 1378207

Delmita is a census-designated place in Starr County, Texas, United States. Its elevation is 272 feet (83 m). Although Delmita is unincorporated, it has a post office, with the ZIP code of 78536. This CDP was new for the 2010 census. As of the 2020 census, Delmita had a population of 186.

The community was founded as Zaragosa in 1919, then was changed to Delmita on April 1, 1931 because of confusion with the Reeves County community of Saragosa. The community's first post office was established soon after the community, and a new post office was constructed in 1991. Delmita's importance has declined through the years; in 1940, it was the most important community in the northeastern part of the county, but it has since been overshadowed by San Isidro.

== Geography ==
Delmita is located at 26°41′7″N 98°25′23″W (26.685150, -98.423067).

== Education ==
The CDP is within the San Isidro Independent School District.

== Demographics ==
Historical population
Census	Pop.	Note	%±
2010	216		—
2020	186		−13.9%
U.S. Decennial Census; 1850–1900 1910; 1920 1930 1940; 1950 1960 1970; 1980 1990 2000; 2010 2020

Delmita first appeared as a census designated place in the 2010 U.S. census.

=== 2020 census ===
Delmita CDP, Texas – Racial and ethnic composition Note: the US Census treats Hispanic/Latino as an ethnic category. This table excludes Latinos from the racial categories and assigns them to a separate category. Hispanics/Latinos may be of any race.
Race / Ethnicity (NH = Non-Hispanic)	Pop 2010	Pop 2020	% 2010	% 2020
White alone (NH)	14	4	6.48%	2.15%
Black or African American alone (NH)	0	0	0.00%	0.00%
Native American or Alaska Native alone (NH)	0	0	0.00%	0.00%
Asian alone (NH)	0	0	0.00%	0.00%
Pacific Islander alone (NH)	0	0	0.00%	0.00%
Some Other Race alone (NH)	0	0	0.00%	0.00%
Mixed Race or Multi-Racial (NH)	0	1	0.00%	0.54%
Hispanic or Latino (any race)	202	181	93.52%	97.31%
Total	216	186	100.00%	100.00%

== See also ==
- List of geographic names derived from anagrams and ananyms
