= San Isidro Independent School District =

School district in Texas, United States

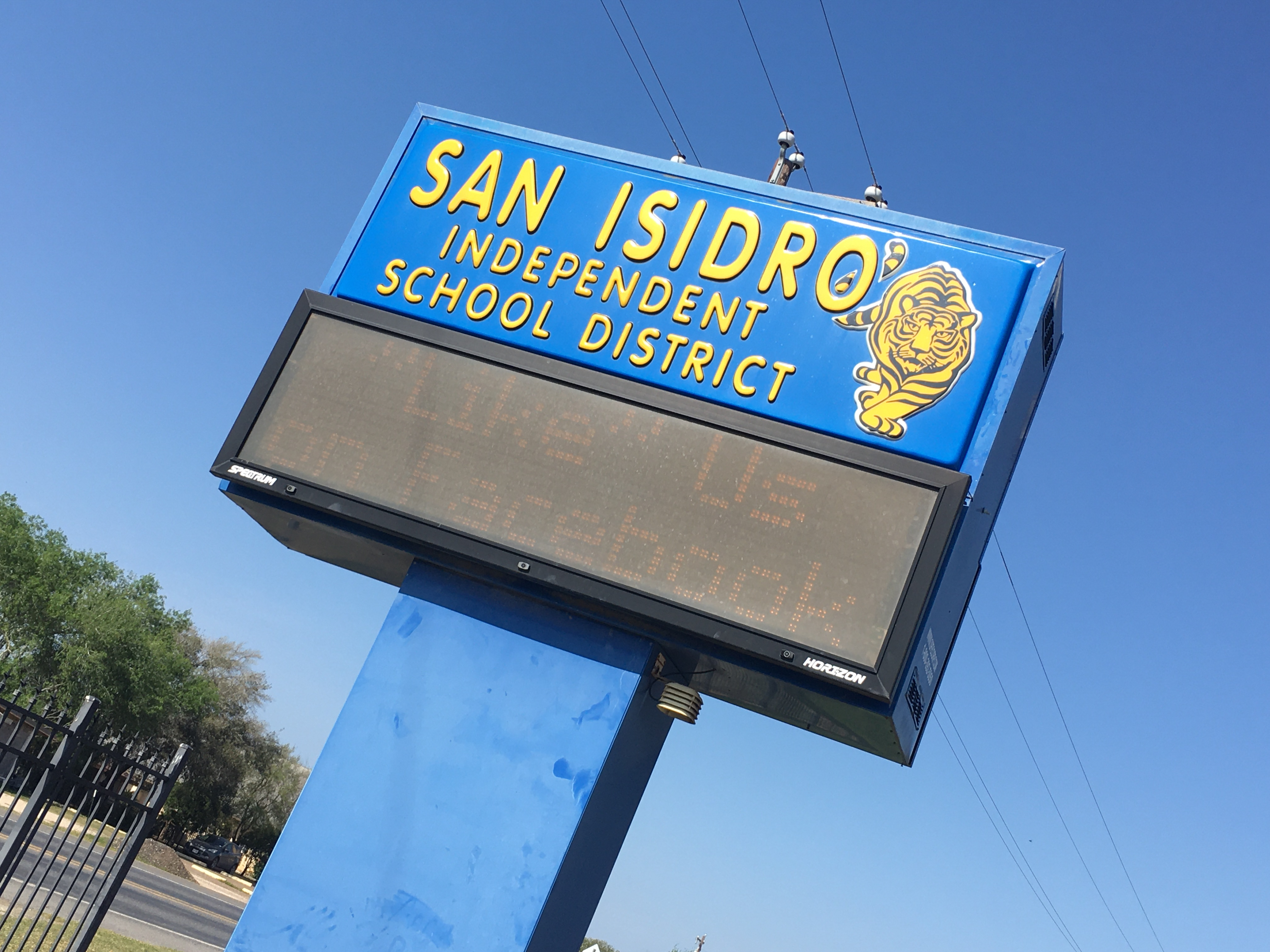

Address
- 5175 FM 1017 San Isidro, TX, 78588; United States

District information
- Grades: PK–12
- Schools: 2
- NCES District ID: 4838910

Students and staff
- Students: 153 (2024–2025)
- Teachers: 17.50 (on an FTE basis)
- Student–teacher ratio: 8.74:1

Other information
- Website: www.sanisidroisd.org

The San Isidro Independent School District is a public school district based in the community of San Isidro, Texas, United States. In addition to San Isidro, the district also serves several other unincorporated communities in rural northeastern Starr County, including: Delmita, Santa Anna, El Centro, La Gloria, La Reforma, Santa Catarina, and Santa Elena.

As of 2007, the Texas State Energy Conservation Office awarded San Isidro ISD money due to the colonias served by the district. In 2009, the school district was rated "recognized" by the Texas Education Agency.

== Schools ==
San Isidro ISD has two campuses -

- San Isidro High School (Grades 9–12)
- San Isidro School (Grades PK-8).

Both campuses were designated National Blue Ribbon Schools in 2005.
