= La Gloria, Starr County, Texas =

La Gloria
- Unincorporated community
- Location within the state of Texas La Gloria (the United States)
- Coordinates: 26°43′12″N 98°31′17″W
- Country: United States
- State: Texas
- County: Starr
- Time zone: UTC-6 (Central (CST))
  - Summer (DST): UTC-5 (CDT)
- GNIS feature ID: 1339318

La Gloria is an unincorporated community in Starr County, Texas, United States. It is situated at the junction of Farm Roads 755 and 1017 in northeastern Starr County, approximately four miles northeast of San Isidro. This area is mainly made up of ranches that were given as Spanish and Mexican land grants in the 18th and 19th centuries, where some of those original land grant families still remain. According to the Handbook of Texas, the community had an estimated population of 102 in 2000.

== Education ==
Public education in the community of La Gloria is provided by the San Isidro Independent School District.
