= Dabney, Texas =

Dabney
- Ghost town
- Location within Texas Location within the United States
- Coordinates: 29°09′45″N 100°05′58″W
- Country: United States
- State: Texas
- County: Uvalde
- Elevation: 1,060 ft (320 m)
- GNIS feature ID: 1379629

Dabney (also known as Whitesmine) is a former mining community in Uvalde County, Texas, United States. Dabney was located at the end of Ranch to Market Road 1022 in southwestern Uvalde County, 19 miles (31 km) west-southwest of Uvalde.

== History ==
An asphalt mine opened at Dabney in 1888. J. G. Smyth bought a plot of land which included the mine site at Dabney in 1891. The mine closed in 1900 and was reopened around 1923 by R. L. White, who leased the property from the owners of the Smyth Ranch. Dabney once had a school, which had 31 students in 1906. In 1941, White attempted to close the mine and remove the remaining asphalt without paying the ranch owners. The owners took the issue to court, and the Texas Supreme Court ultimately ruled against White in 1947. By this time all but one house in Dabney was abandoned, though the population grew to 25 by 1966. The town had thirty people, two mines, and a business as of 1988. The Vulcan Materials Company took over the mines at Dabney in 1990; by this time, the mine operators claimed the town had no residents.
