= Dabneys, Virginia =

Unincorporated community in Virginia, United States

- Unincorporated community
- Location within Virginia Location within the United States
- Coordinates: 37°45′49″N 77°48′06″W
- Country: United States
- State: Virginia
- County: Louisa
- Elevation: 295 ft (90 m)
- Time zone: UTC-5 (Eastern (EST))
  - Summer (DST): UTC-4 (EDT)
- Area code: 540
- GNIS feature ID: 1492831

Dabneys is an unincorporated community in Louisa County, Virginia, United States, located 11 miles (18 km) west-northwest of Wyndham.
