= El Indio, Texas =

Census-designated place in Maverick County, Texas, United States

- Census-designated place
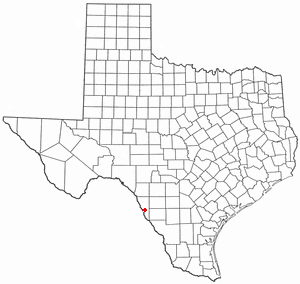
- Location of El Indio, Texas

- Coordinates: 28°30′54″N 100°18′42″W
- Country: United States
- State: Texas
- County: Maverick

Area
  - Total: 1.8 sq mi (4.6 km^{2})
  - Land: 1.8 sq mi (4.6 km^{2})
  - Water: 0 sq mi (0.0 km^{2})
- Elevation: 735 ft (224 m)

Population (2020)
  - Total: 182
  - Density: 100/sq mi (40/km^{2})
- Time zone: UTC-6 (Central (CST))
  - Summer (DST): UTC-5 (CDT)
- ZIP code: 78860
- Area code: 830
- FIPS code: 48-23080
- GNIS feature ID: 1356868

El Indio (/ɛlˈaɪndiːoʊ/, Spanish pronunciation: [eˈlindjo]) is a census-designated place (CDP) in Maverick County, Texas, United States. As of the 2020 census, El Indio had a population of 182.

== Geography ==
El Indio is located at 28°30′54″N 100°18′42″W (28.514900, -100.311537).

According to the United States Census Bureau, the CDP has a total area of 1.8 square miles (4.7 km^{2}), all land.

== Demographics ==
Historical population
Census	Pop.	Note	%±
2000	263		—
2010	190		−27.8%
2020	182		−4.2%
U.S. Decennial Census; 1850–1900 1910; 1920 1930 1940; 1950 1960 1970; 1980 1990 2000; 2010

El Indio first appeared as a census designated place in the 2000 U.S. census.

=== 2020 census ===
El Indio CDP, Texas – Racial and ethnic composition Note: the US Census treats Hispanic/Latino as an ethnic category. This table excludes Latinos from the racial categories and assigns them to a separate category. Hispanics/Latinos may be of any race.
Race / Ethnicity (NH = Non-Hispanic)	Pop 2000	Pop 2010	Pop 2020	% 2000	% 2010	% 2020
White alone (NH)	7	14	2	2.66%	7.37%	1.10%
Black or African American alone (NH)	0	7	0	0.00%	3.68%	0.00%
Native American or Alaska Native alone (NH)	0	0	4	0.00%	0.00%	2.20%
Asian alone (NH)	0	0	0	0.00%	0.00%	0.00%
Native Hawaiian or Pacific Islander alone (NH)	0	0	0	0.00%	0.00%	0.00%
Other Race alone (NH)	0	0	0	0.00%	0.00%	0.00%
Mixed race or Multiracial (NH)	1	0	3	0.38%	0.00%	1.65%
Hispanic or Latino (any race)	255	169	173	96.96%	88.95%	95.05%
Total	263	190	182	100.00%	100.00%	100.00%

As of the 2020 United States census, there were 182 people, 0 households, and 0 families residing in the CDP.

=== 2000 census ===
As of the census of 2000, there were 263 people, 65 households, and 59 families residing in the CDP. The population density was 149.3 inhabitants per square mile (57.6/km^{2}). There were 91 housing units at an average density of 51.7 per square mile (20.0/km^{2}). The racial makeup of the CDP was 64.26% White, 1.90% Native American, 28.14% from other races, and 5.70% from two or more races. Hispanic or Latino of any race were 96.96% of the population.

There were 65 households, out of which 52.3% had children under the age of 18 living with them, 81.5% were married couples living together, 7.7% had a female householder with no husband present, and 9.2% were non-families. 7.7% of all households were made up of individuals, and 6.2% had someone living alone who was 65 years of age or older. The average household size was 4.05 and the average family size was 4.32.

In the CDP the population was spread out, with 39.5% under the age of 18, 11.0% from 18 to 24, 21.7% from 25 to 44, 19.0% from 45 to 64, and 8.7% who were 65 years of age or older. The median age was 25 years. For every 100 females there were 89.2 males. For every 100 females age 18 and over, there were 98.8 males.

The median income for a household in the CDP was $20,179, and the median income for a family was $20,179. Males had a median income of $26,250 versus $0 for females. The per capita income for the CDP was $5,462. About 25.5% of families and 35.8% of the population were below the poverty line, including 62.3% of those under the age of 18 and none of those 65 or over.

== See also ==
- List of census-designated places in Texas
