= Dabney, West Virginia =

Unincorporated community in West Virginia, United States

- Unincorporated community
- Location within West Virginia Location within the United States
- Coordinates: 37°48′43″N 81°55′42″W
- Country: United States
- State: West Virginia
- County: Logan
- Elevation: 715 ft (218 m)
- Time zone: UTC-5 (Eastern (EST))
  - Summer (DST): UTC-4 (EDT)
- Area codes: 304 & 681
- GNIS feature ID: 1549652

Dabney is an unincorporated community in Logan County, West Virginia, United States. Dabney is 4 miles (6.4 km) southeast of Logan. It was also known as Kleenkoal.
