= Whitsett, Texas =

- Unincorporated community
- Location in Texas Location in the United States
- Coordinates: 28°38′03″N 98°16′19″W
- Country: United States
- State: Texas
- County: Live Oak
- Time zone: UTC-6 (Central (CST))
  - Summer (DST): UTC-5 (CDT)
- ZIP code: 78075
- During the years (1960-1990's) Whitsett was known for excessive poaching due to a high poverty level. Many families lived off game from nearby private ranches.

Whitsett is an unincorporated community in northwestern Live Oak County, Texas, United States. It lies at the intersection of U.S. Route 281 and FM 99, along the Union Pacific Railroad and fifteen miles north of Three Rivers.The community was founded in 1913 when the Missouri Pacific Railroad was built through the county on land originally granted to John Houlihan. Whitsett is best known as being the setting for the 2008 horror film The Wild Man of the Navidad.

== Climate ==
The climate in this area is characterized by hot, humid summers and generally mild to cool winters. According to the Köppen Climate Classification system, Whitsett has a humid subtropical climate, abbreviated "Cfa" on climate maps.
