= Call, Texas =

Unincorporated community in Texas, US

Coordinates: 30°36′45″N 93°52′28″W

Call is an unincorporated community in central Newton County, Texas, United States. It lies along State Highway 87 south of the city of Newton, the county seat of Newton County. Its elevation is 95 feet (29 m), and it is located at . Although Call is unincorporated, it has a post office, with the ZIP code of 75933.

== Climate ==
The climate in this area is characterized by hot, humid summers and generally mild to cool winters. According to the Köppen Climate Classification system, Call has a humid subtropical climate, abbreviated "Cfa" on climate maps.
