= Dabney Montgomery =

American pilot and bodyguard (1923–2016)

Dabney N. Montgomery (April 18, 1923 – September 3, 2016) was an American pilot and bodyguard.

Born in Selma, Alabama, Montgomery went to Lutheran Academy and the Selma University High School. He joined the armed forces in 1943, serving in the U.S. Army Air Corps. Montgomery graduated from Livingstone College in 1949 and studied music at the Boston Conservatory.

He was a bodyguard for Martin Luther King Jr. during the 1965 Selma to Montgomery marches, in Alabama. Montgomery was awarded the Congressional Gold Medal in 2007.

He died on September 3, 2016, of natural causes.
