= San Isidro, Texas =

- CDP
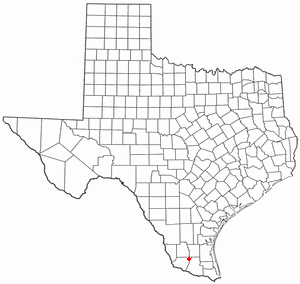
- Location of San Isidro, Texas

- Coordinates: 26°43′8″N 98°26′39″W
- Country: United States
- State: Texas
- County: Starr

Area
  - Total: 3.1 sq mi (8.0 km^{2})
  - Land: 3.1 sq mi (8.0 km^{2})
  - Water: 0.0 sq mi (0 km^{2})
- Elevation: 282 ft (86 m)

Population (2020)
  - Total: 187
  - Density: 60/sq mi (23/km^{2})
- Time zone: UTC-6 (Central (CST))
  - Summer (DST): UTC-5 (CDT)
- ZIP code: 78588, 78536
- Area code: 956
- FIPS code: 48-65432
- GNIS feature ID: 1346363

San Isidro is a census-designated place (CDP) in Starr County, Texas, United States. As of the 2020 census, San Isidro had a population of 187. The town is named for St. Isidore the Laborer, the patron saint of farmers. A large Southwestern Barrel Cactus growing just east of town is said to be the largest in Texas.

== Geography ==
San Isidro is located at 26°43′8″N 98°26′39″W (26.718830, -98.444126).

The CDP lost a little area prior to the 2010 census, making the total area of 3.1 square miles (8.0 km^{2}), all land.

== Demographics ==
Historical population
| Census | Pop. | Note | %± |
|---|---|---|---|
| 2000 | 270 | | — |
| 2010 | 240 | | −11.1% |
| 2020 | 187 | | −22.1% |
U.S. Decennial Census; 1850–1900 1910; 1920 1930 1940; 1950 1960 1970; 1980 1990 2000; 2010

San Isidro was first listed as a census designated place in the 2000 U.S. census.

=== 2020 census ===
San Isidro CDP, Texas – Racial and ethnic composition Note: the US Census treats Hispanic/Latino as an ethnic category. This table excludes Latinos from the racial categories and assigns them to a separate category. Hispanics/Latinos may be of any race.
| Race / Ethnicity (NH = Non-Hispanic) | Pop 2000 | Pop 2010 | Pop 2020 | % 2000 | % 2010 | % 2020 |
|---|---|---|---|---|---|---|
| White alone (NH) | 4 | 22 | 10 | 1.48% | 9.17% | 5.35% |
| Black or African American alone (NH) | 0 | 0 | 0 | 0.00% | 0.00% | 0.00% |
| Native American or Alaska Native alone (NH) | 0 | 0 | 0 | 0.00% | 0.00% | 0.00% |
| Asian alone (NH) | 0 | 0 | 0 | 0.00% | 0.00% | 0.00% |
| Pacific Islander alone (NH) | 0 | 0 | 0 | 0.00% | 0.00% | 0.00% |
| Some Other Race alone (NH) | 0 | 0 | 0 | 0.00% | 0.00% | 0.00% |
| Mixed race or Multiracial (NH) | 0 | 0 | 1 | 0.00% | 0.00% | 0.53% |
| Hispanic or Latino (any race) | 266 | 218 | 176 | 98.52% | 90.83% | 94.12% |
| Total | 270 | 240 | 187 | 100.00% | 100.00% | 100.00% |

As of the 2020 United States census, there were 187 people, 40 households, and 28 families residing in the CDP.

=== 2000 census ===
At the 2000 census there were 270 people, 94 households, and 70 families in the CDP. The population density was 82.9 inhabitants per square mile (32.0/km^{2}). There were 113 housing units at an average density of 34.7 per square mile (13.4/km^{2}). The racial makeup of the CDP was 95.19% White, 3.33% from other races, and 1.48% from two or more races. 98.52% of the population were Hispanic or Latino of any race. Of the 94 households 39.4% had children under the age of 18 living with them, 61.7% were married couples living together, 10.6% had a female householder with no husband present, and 25.5% were non-families. 24.5% of households were one person and 14.9% were one person aged 65 or older. The average household size was 2.87 and the average family size was 3.49.

The age distribution was 32.6% under the age of 18, 5.6% from 18 to 24, 24.8% from 25 to 44, 22.6% from 45 to 64, and 14.4% 65 or older. The median age was 36 years. For every 100 females, there were 110.9 males. For every 100 females age 18 and over, there were 95.7 males.

The median household income was $18,750 and the median family income was $20,313. Males had a median income of $15,625 versus $33,333 for females. The per capita income for the CDP was $8,965. 42.3% of the population and 35.9% of families were below the poverty line. Out of the total population, 57.6% of those under the age of 18 and 7.1% of those 65 and older were living below the poverty line.

== Education ==
San Isidro is served by the San Isidro Independent School District and is home to the San Isidro High School Tigers.
