= Hill Country State Natural Area =

Protected area in Texas, United States

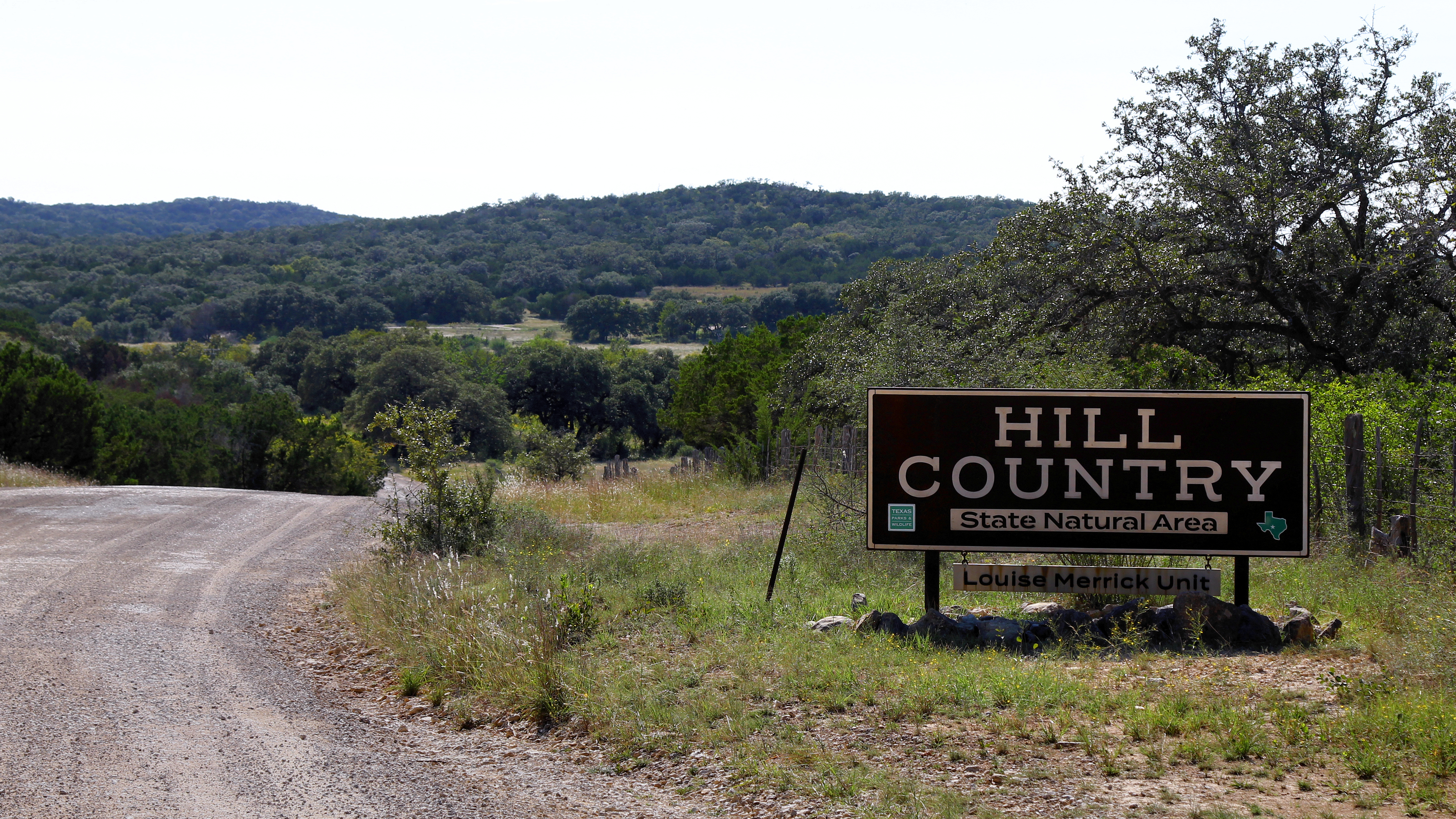
- Hill Country State Natural Area entrance

- Location within Texas Location within the United States
- Location: Bandera County / Medina County, Texas
- Nearest city: Bandera
- Coordinates: 29°37′40″N 99°10′50″W
- Area: 5,369 acres (2,173 ha)
- Established: 1984; 42 years ago
- Visitors: 22,379 (in 2025)
- Governing body: Texas Parks and Wildlife Department
- Website: Official site

Hill Country State Natural Area (HCSNA) preserves 5,369 acres (21.73 km^{2}) of rugged, relatively pristine Hill Country terrain in Bandera County, Texas, United States. It was opened to the public in 1984. Since HCSNA is designated a "Natural Area" rather than a "State Park", the first priority of the Texas Parks and Wildlife Department (TPWD) is the maintenance and preservation of the property's natural state. Accordingly, facilities are purposely somewhat primitive and recreational activities may be curtailed if the TPWD deems it necessary to protect the environment.

== Location ==
Hill Country State Natural Area is located on the border of Bandera County and Medina County, approximately 10 miles (16 km) southwest of Bandera, 20 miles (32 km) north of Hondo, and 45 miles (72 km) west-northwest of San Antonio.

== History ==
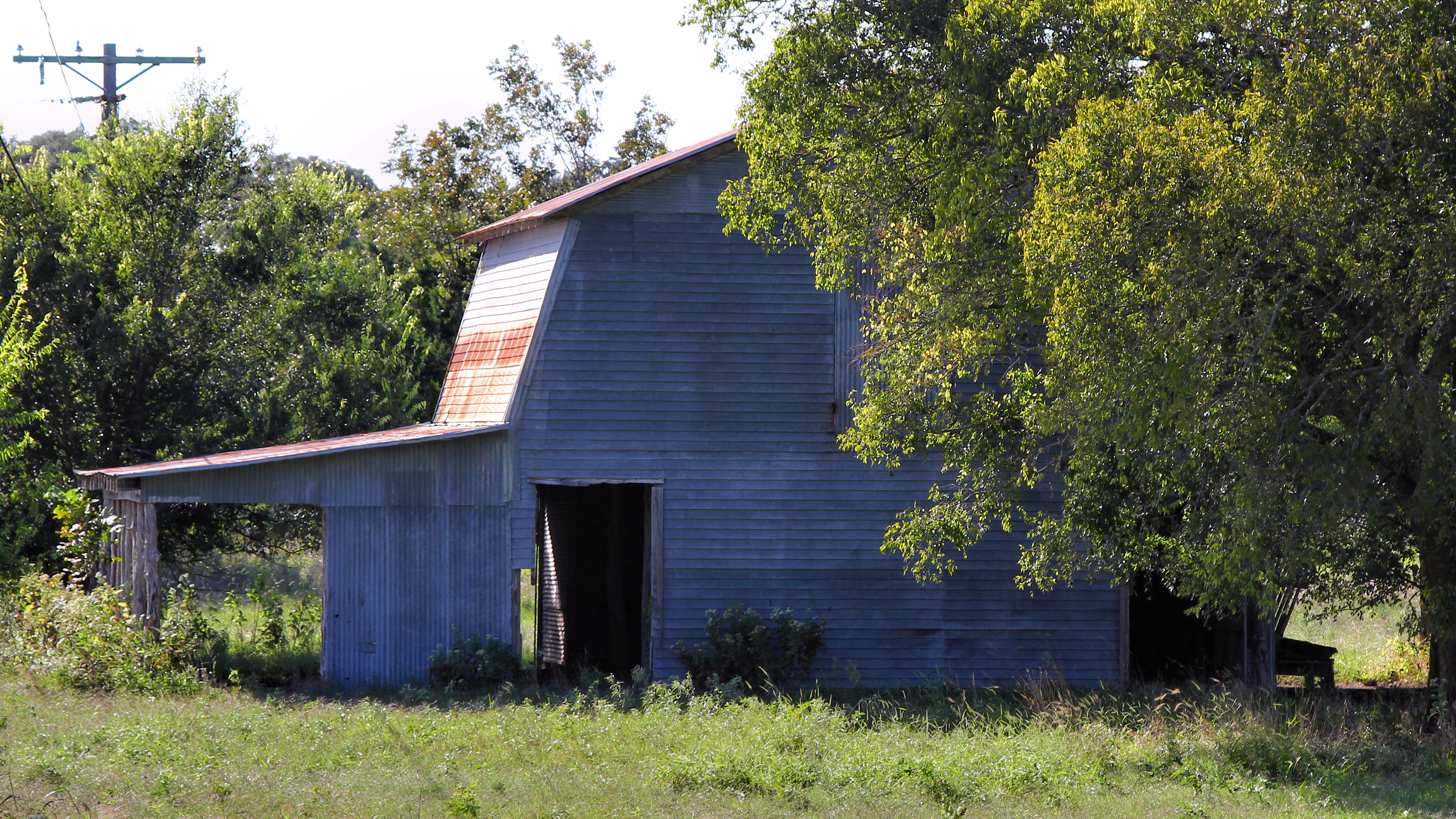
The Spring Barn is a reminder of the area's farming and ranching heritage.

The land within the preserve has been inhabited for several thousand years, and a number of Native American artifacts have been found on the property, including human remains. After the arrival of European settlers in the mid-1800s, the area became part of a working ranch. The bottomlands were converted to cropland and the remainder was used for grazing. Eventually becoming the Bar-O Ranch, several parcels of land were subsequently donated by Louise Merrick between 1976 and 1982 to establish the Hill Country State Natural Area. Merrick stipulated that the property was “to be kept far removed and untouched by modern civilization, where everything is preserved intact, yet put to a useful purpose”. The preserve was opened to the public in 1984 with 4,753 acres (19.23 km^{2}). In 1986 a further 616 acres (2.49 km^{2}) were acquired, bringing the total size to the current 5,369 acres (21.73 km^{2}).

== Geography and geology ==
Set in the scenic hills and canyons typical of the Texas Hill Country, the preserve lies about ten miles north of the Balcones escarpment and within the Balcones Fault Zone. The elevation ranges from approximately 1,280 to 2,000 feet (390 to 610 m). The local Woodard Cave Fault runs through the property on a general east-west line. The terrain of the area consists of eroded limestone hills and mesas, which are typical landforms of the Hill Country. There are also relatively flat bottomland areas surrounding the small creeks that drain the property. The local bedrock is exposed throughout much of the preserve. The highest hilltops, and the lower hills in the southern part of HCSNA, are capped by fairly resistant limestone of the Fort Terret formation within the Edwards Group, which is the dominant bedrock of the Edwards Plateau to the north. The rest of the preserve lies atop the softer, more easily eroded Upper Glen Rose Formation, also a limestone.

== Nature ==
=== Plants ===
HCSNA supports eight recognized plant community types and over 450 plant species. The majority of the preserve is covered by woodlands of Texas live oak (Quercus fusiformis) and Ashe juniper (Juniperus ashei), commonly called "mountain cedar", live oak savannah, Texas red oak (Quercus buckleyi) woodlands, and open grasslands composed primarily of sideoats grama (Bouteloua curtipendula) and little bluestem (Schizachyrium scoparium). Smaller communities include stands of Lacey oak (Quercus laceyi), pecan (Carya illinoinensis), and sugar hackberry (Celtis laevigata) and gramagrass-switchgrass (Panicum virgatum) grasslands, as well as fields of sotol (Dasylirion wheeleri). The natural vegetation of the property, like much of the Texas Hill Country, has suffered from overgrazing and the introduction of invasive species like exotic King Ranch bluestem (Bothriochloa ischaemum var. songarica).

=== Animals ===
HCSNA affords good opportunities for bird watching. Over 160 species of birds have been sighted in the preserve, including one bird species classified as endangered: the golden-cheeked warbler (Dendroica chrysoparia).

As in much of the Hill Country, white-tailed deer (Odocoileus virginianus) are by far the most common large mammal on the property. Other species present include wild turkey, Mexican long-nosed armadillo, striped skunk, raccoon, Virginia opossum, eastern cottontail, black-tailed jackrabbit, and eastern fox squirrel. Feral pig, European fallow deer, axis deer, porcupine, rock squirrel, and ringtail can occasionally be encountered. Bobcat, coyote, red fox, gray fox, and mountain lion, inhabit the area but are seldom seen by visitors.

== Recreation ==
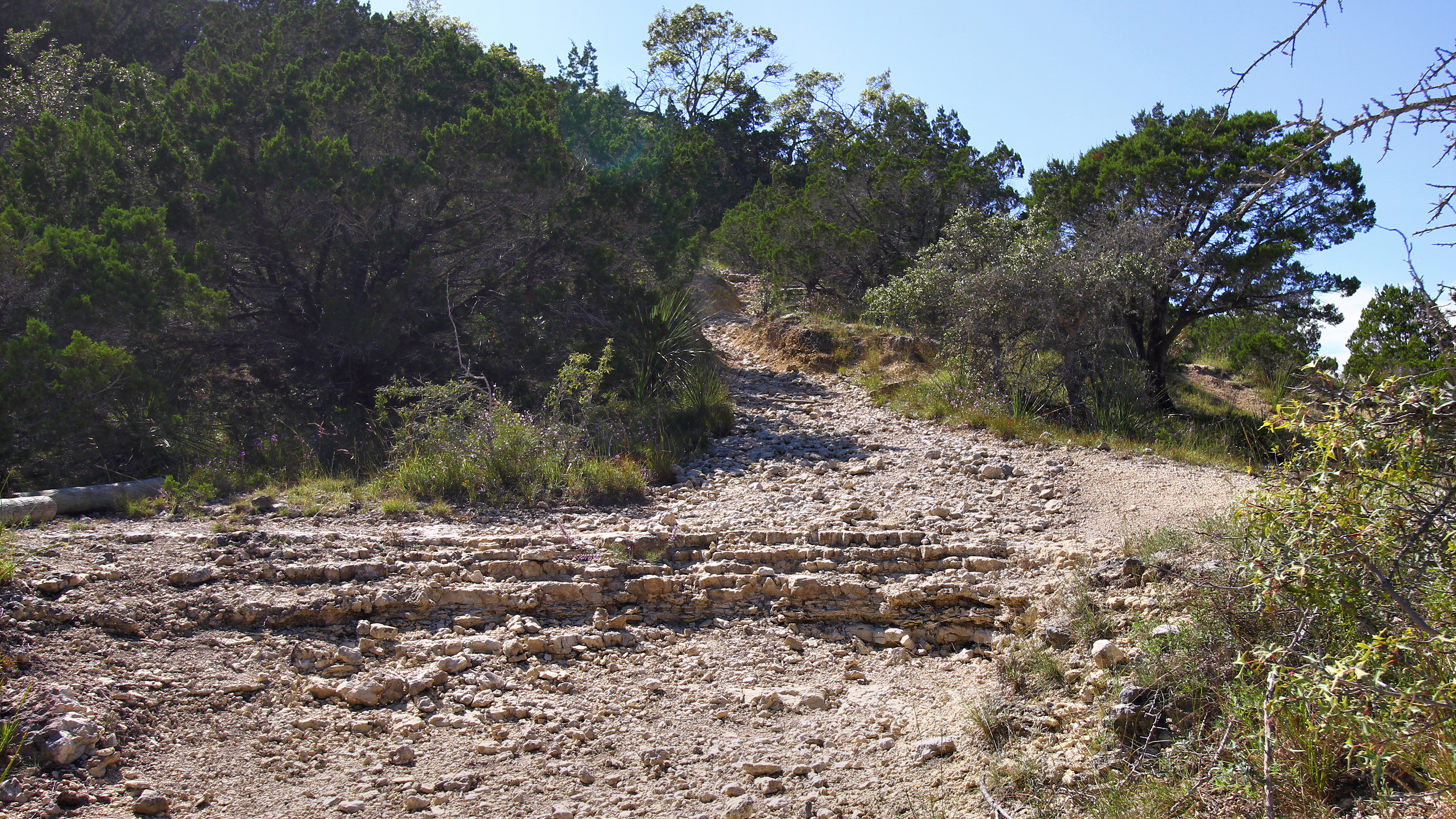
The West Peak Overlook Trail, one of the challenging trails in the area.

HCSNA has over 40 miles (64 km) of multi-use trails and permits hiking, biking and horseback riding. Equestrian facilities are available. Several dude ranches adjoin the property and regularly lead hikes and trail rides through the Natural Area. The picturesque, but intermittent, West Verde Creek runs through the preserve, allowing for swimming and fishing when water levels are high enough. For herd management purposes, TPWD conducts controlled deer hunting by a limited number of hunters during a few weekends each season. HCSNA also hosts the annual Bandera 100 km ultramarathon run in January

HCSNA urges all visitors to respect the "Leave No Trace" set of wilderness ethics: plan ahead and prepare; travel on marked trails only; always dispose of waste properly; leave behind what you find; never build an open fire; respect wildlife; and be considerate of other visitors.

== Camping ==
Consistent with its designation as a natural area, the site is deliberately left largely undeveloped and natural, relative to a typical state park. Camping is limited to nine walk-in campsites, three small hike-in camping areas, and five equestrian campsites with horse pens. The campsites and camping areas lack sewer, electric, and potable water hookups. There is a group lodge with electric hookups, but it also lacks potable water.

== Nearby Parks ==
- Garner State Park
- Lost Maples State Natural Area
- Government Canyon State Natural Area
- Guadalupe River State Park and adjacent Honey Creek State Natural Area

== See also ==
- List of Texas state parks
