= Guadalupe River State Park =

State park in Texas, United States

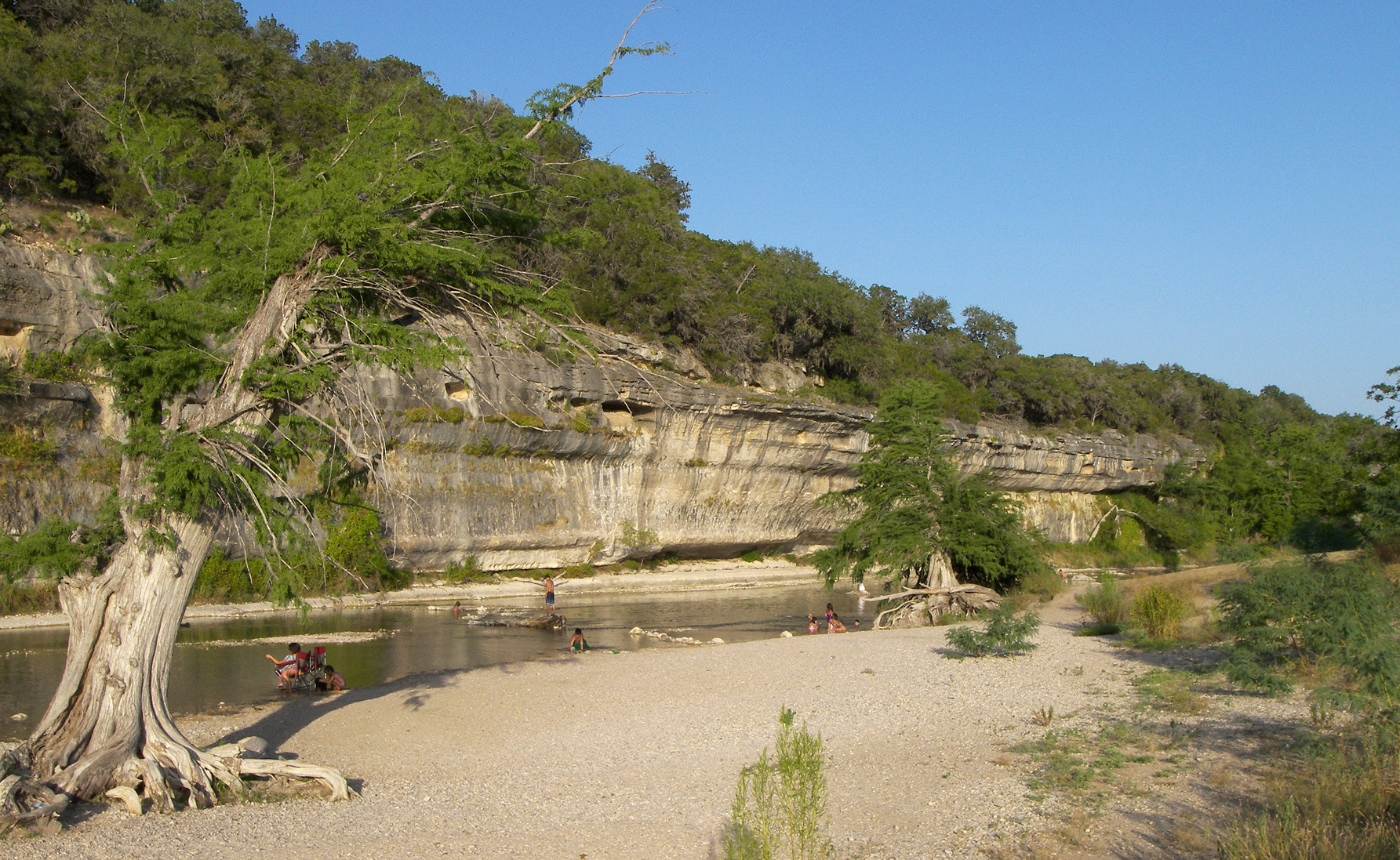
- A bluff in Guadalupe River State Park

- Location within Texas Location within the United States
- Location: Comal County / Kendall County, Texas
- Nearest city: Bulverde
- Coordinates: 29°52′29″N 98°30′16″W
- Area: 1,938.7 acres (785 ha)
- Established: 1983
- Visitors: 188,220 (in 2025)
- Governing body: Texas Parks and Wildlife Department
- Website: Official site

Guadalupe River State Park is a 1,938.7-acre (784.6 ha) state park located on a section of the Guadalupe River in Kendall and Comal Counties, Texas, United States and is administered by the Texas Parks and Wildlife Department. The land was acquired by deed from private owners in 1974 and was opened to the public in 1983.

670 acres (270 ha) is located on the north side of the river and is named the Bauer Unit, after the German couple that settled there in the mid-1800s. There are no amenities or facilities in the Bauer Unit, just trails. The Bamberger Trail is named after J. David Bamberger, who sold most of the land that became the Bauer Unit to the State of Texas in 1974.

== Features ==
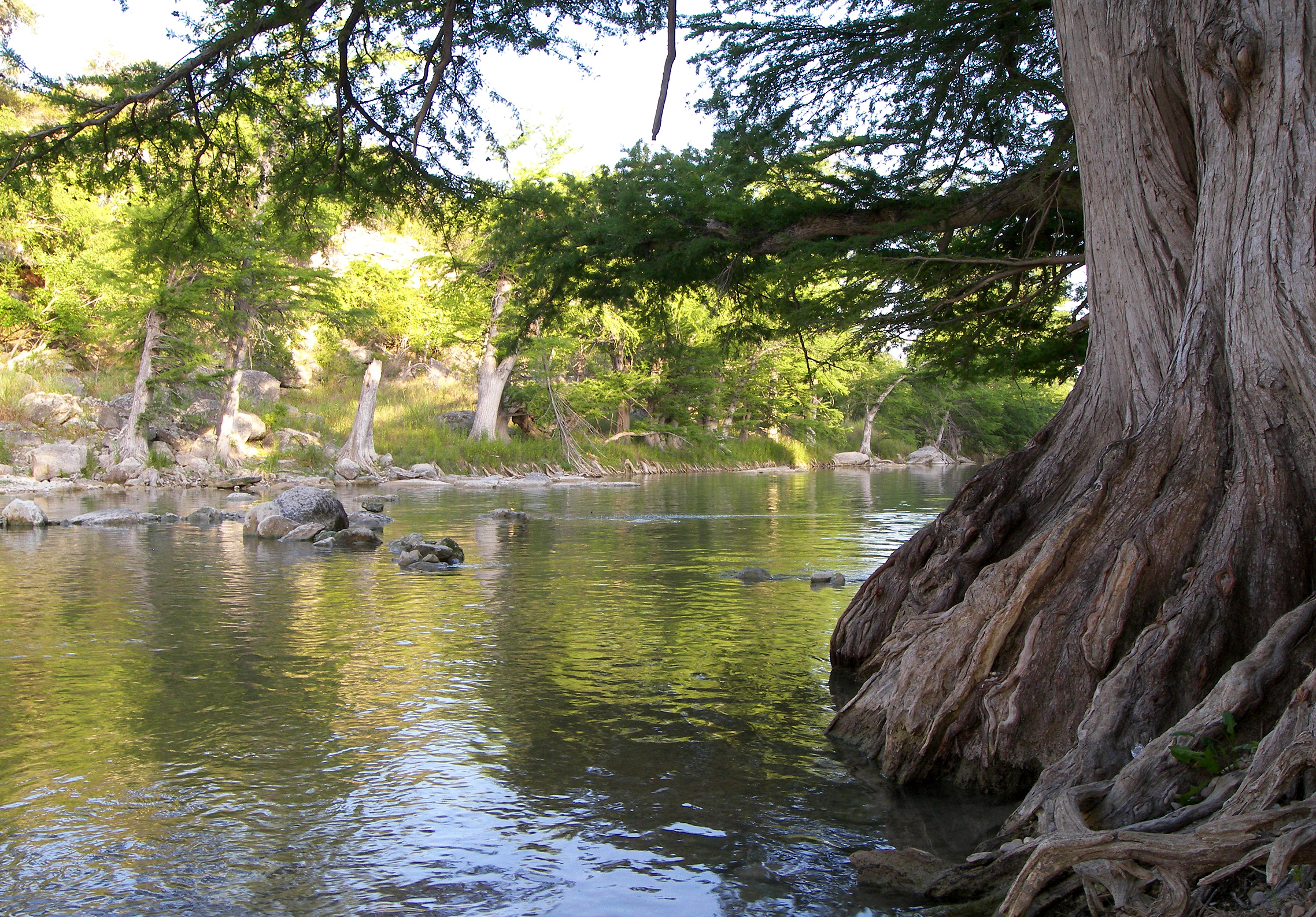
A cypress tree on the banks of the Guadalupe River

The park has four miles of river frontage for canoeing, fishing, swimming and tubing. Other activities include picnicking, hiking, birdwatching and camping. There is a 5.3-mile equestrian trail that can also be used for mountain biking. There is a two-hour guided interpretive tour of the adjacent Honey Creek State Natural Area.

=== Plants ===
Bald Cypress, American sycamore, pecan, Texas live oak, Ashe juniper, Texas persimmon, cedar elm and honey mesquite are species of trees that can be found in the park. Frostweed, antelope horns, snow-on-the-mountain, prairie verbena, twistleaf yucca, lace cactus, agarita, poison ivy and greenbriar are plants documented in the park.

=== Animals ===
White-tailed deer are common throughout the park, as well as raccoons, Mexican long-nosed armadillos, and skunks. The Ashe juniper woodland provides nesting grounds for the endangered golden-cheeked warbler. The northern cardinal, lesser goldfinch, American robin, Carolina chickadee, black-chinned hummingbird, chipping sparrow, painted bunting and many other bird species are also found in the park.

== See also ==
- List of Texas state parks
