= Lost Maples State Natural Area =

Protected area in Texas, United States

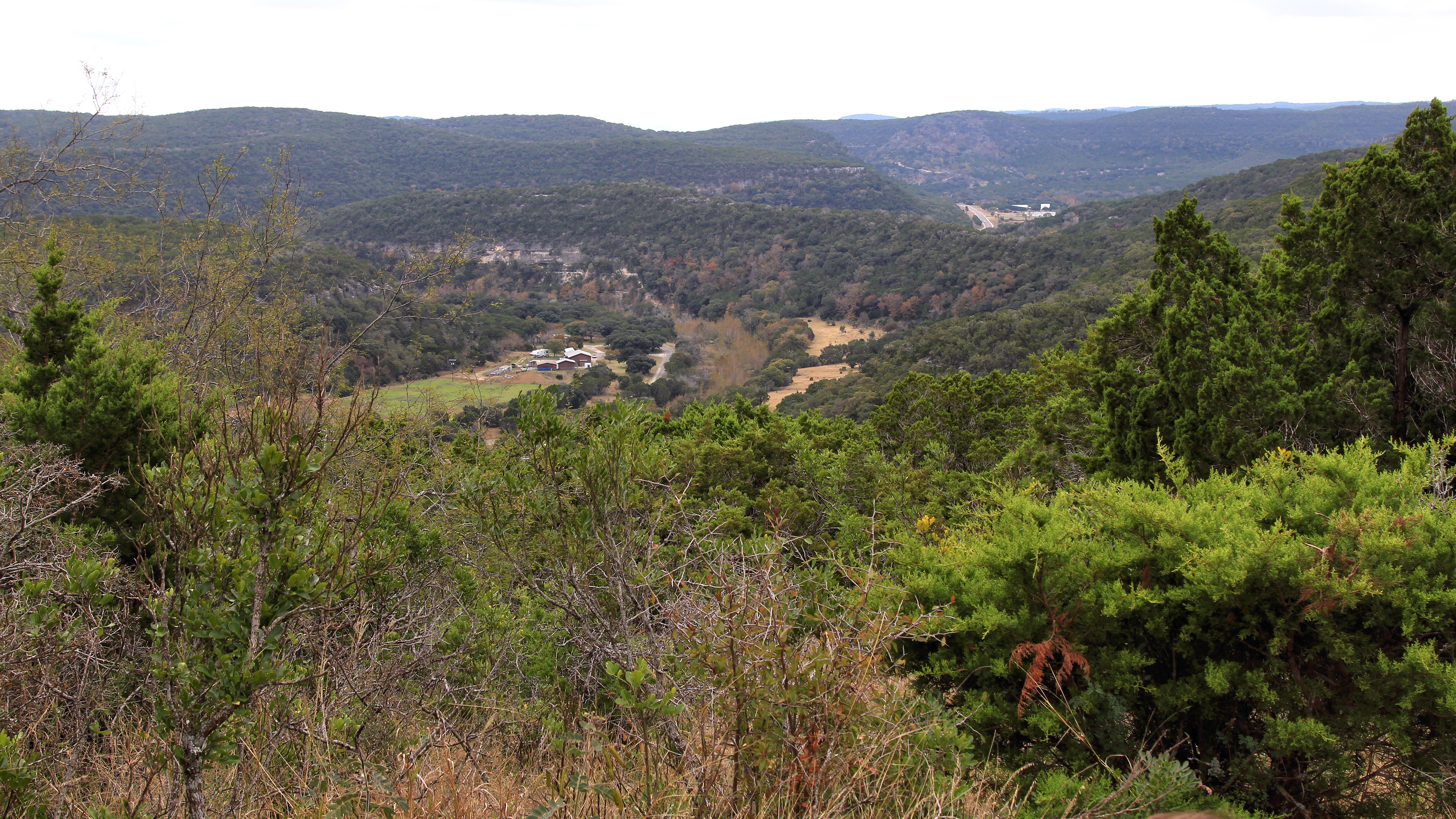
- Scenic overlook in Lost Maples
- Location: Bandera County / Real County, Texas
- Nearest city: Vanderpool
- Coordinates: 29°49′11″N 99°34′59″W
- Area: 2,906 acres (1,176 ha)
- Established: 1973
- Visitors: 86,450 (in 2025)
- Governing body: Texas Parks and Wildlife Department
- Website: Official site

U.S. National Natural Landmark
- Designated: 1980

Lost Maples State Natural Area is a 2,906-acre (1,176 ha) area of hills and canyons on the upper Sabinal River in Bandera and Real Counties, Texas, United States. It is designated a Natural Area, rather than a State Park, which means the primary focus is the maintenance and protection of the property's natural state. Accordingly, access and recreational activities may be restricted if the Texas Parks & Wildlife Department (TPWD) deems such action necessary to protect the environment. The park opened to the public in 1979.

== Location ==
The Lost Maples State Natural Area is located about 5 miles (8 km) north of Vanderpool, Texas, and 71 miles (114 km) northwest of San Antonio. The preserve sits along the Sabinal River in western Bandera County and far eastern Real County.

== History ==
The land for Lost Maples State Natural Area was acquired by the state of Texas in 1973 and 1974, and was opened to the public in 1979. In 1980, the Heritage Conservation and Recreation Service made the Natural Area a National Natural Landmark. The area was named for its abundance of maples, which typically grow in cooler climates.

Humans have inhabited this area since prehistoric times. The recorded history of the area, beginning with Spanish explorations in the 17th century, identifies a number of Indian groups, including the Apache, Lipan Apache and Comanche, as having foraged, hunted, and occasionally lived in this part of the Texas Hill Country.

== Geology ==
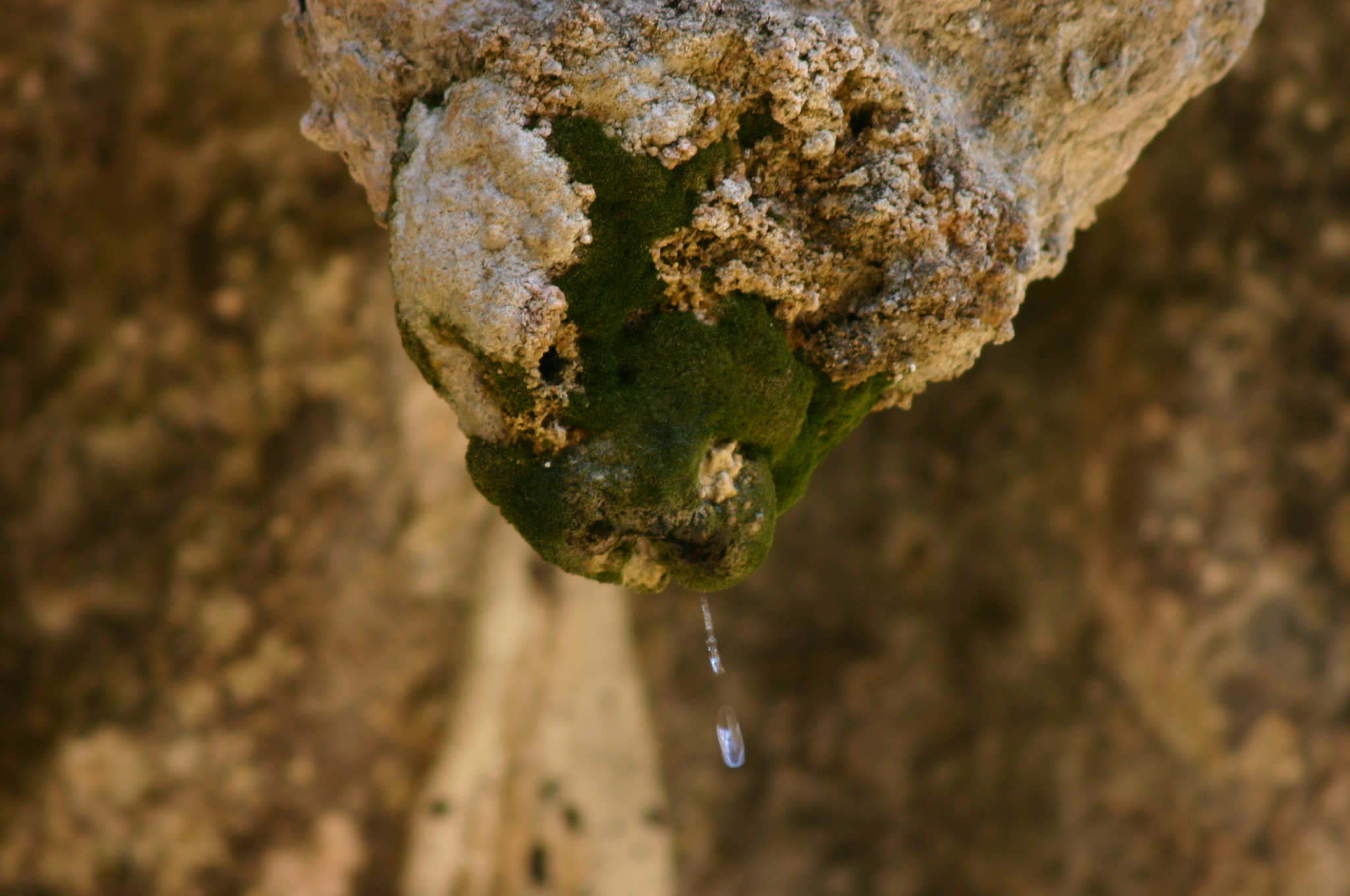
Stalactite along the East Trail in Lost Maples State Natural Area

Much of the area's limestone bedrock is exposed on elevated terrain, which has a shallow, discontinuous cover of dark gray stony clay (Eckrant series). Most valley bottoms have deep, dark brown silty clay (Krum series) or clay loam (Pratley series). Deposits of gravel, sand, and loam (Orif-Boerne association) lie within a few hundred feet of the Sabinal River. All of these soils have free calcium carbonate throughout their profiles and are moderately alkaline. Despite a high clay content in most cases, poorly drained soils are too inexpensive to be mapped.

== Animals ==
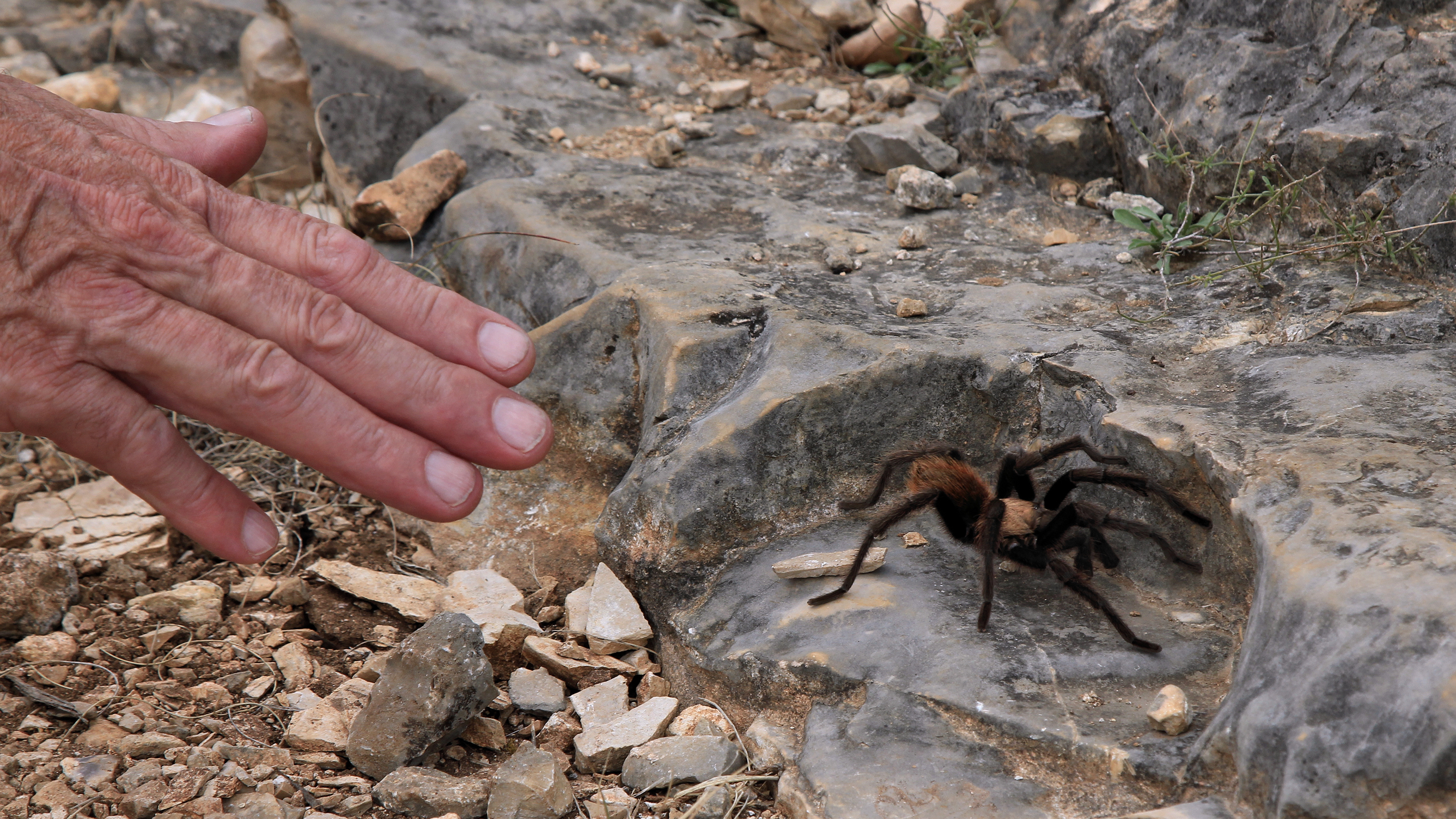
A Texas brown tarantula

As in much of the Hill Country, white-tailed deer are by far the most common large mammal on the property. Additionally, wild turkey, Mexican long-nosed armadillo, striped skunk, common raccoon, Virginia opossum, eastern cottontail, and eastern fox squirrel are present. Feral pig, exotic axis deer, North American porcupine, rock squirrel, and ringtail may occasionally be encountered. Bobcat, coyote, both red fox and grey fox, and mountain lion also inhabit the general area but are seldom seen by visitors.

Bird life, including several different raptors, is particularly abundant and diverse throughout the year. The endangered golden-cheeked warbler is found within the park. Venomous snakes including the broad-banded copperhead, coral snake, and western diamond-backed rattlesnake have also been documented nearby. The Texas Alligator Lizard has been documented in the park. The Texas brown tarantula is often spotted. The Sabinal River maintains surface water even during exceptional drought (as in 2011), so fish and other aquatic animals are always present.

== Plants ==
Primary vegetation includes the Ashe juniper (often called mountain cedar), several different species of oak, bigtooth maple, American sycamore, escarpment black cherry, Texas ash, yellow-flowered red buckeye, mesquite, Texas persimmon, Texas mountain-laurel, Texas madrone, redbud, wild grape, prickly pear, Virginia creeper and various types of brush, grasses, and ferns. Bigtooth maple colors are brilliant if autumn is droughty, or has cold nights, but are more muted in a mild, damp autumn. Texas red oak gives a fine crimson display almost every year and may retain its leaves well into winter. The Natural Area is most crowded when the fall colors peak in late October-early November. Evidence suggests that the maple trees that give the preserve its name are relics: remnants of a larger, more widespread population that flourished during the cooler and wetter climate of the last glacial period. Today, their distribution is limited by the relative rarity of the soils and microclimates they require to thrive.

A more extensive list of the preserve's fauna and flora can be found at the LMSNA Ranger Station.

== Recreation ==
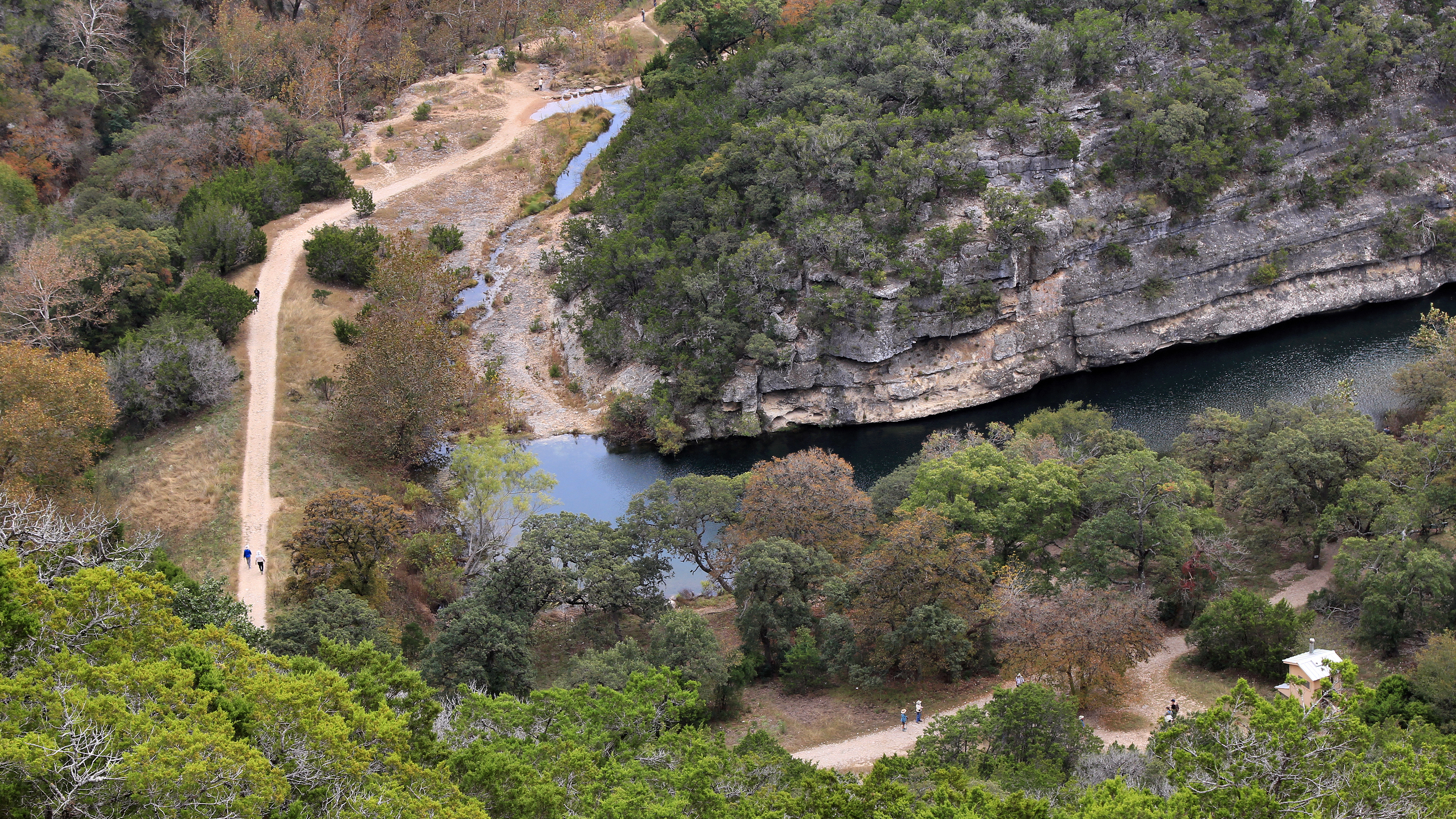
One of the ponds in Can Creek Canyon, seen from an East Trail overlook

Lost Maples is a State Natural Area and therefore has been developed only enough to provide access to visitors, while still protecting its natural character. The 2,906-acre (1,176 ha) reserve contains 11 miles (18 km) of hiking trails, 30 campsites, and eight primitive camping areas. In the center of the park are two small lakes along Can Creek.

The Texas Parks & Wildlife Department urges all visitors to respect the Leave No Trace set of wilderness ethics... 1) Plan Ahead and Prepare, 2) Travel on Marked Trails Only, 3) Always Dispose of Waste Properly, 4) Leave Behind What You Find, 5) Never Build An Open Fire, 6) Respect All Wildlife, and 7) Be Considerate of Other Visitors. Please do your part by following this code, and protecting the park's sensitive natural and cultural resources.

== See also ==
- List of Texas state parks
