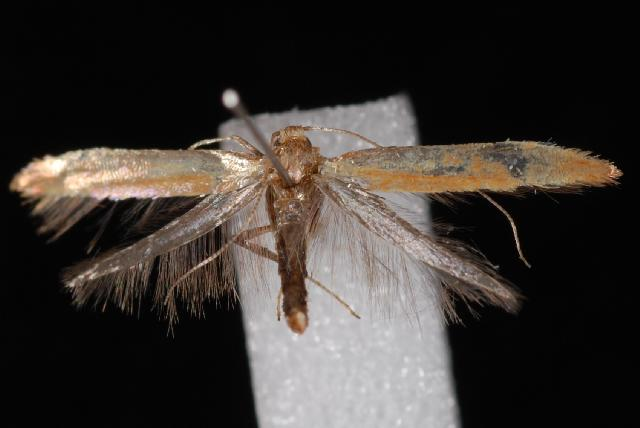

Scientific classification
- Kingdom: Animalia
- Phylum: Arthropoda
- Clade: Pancrustacea
- Class: Insecta
- Order: Lepidoptera
- Family: Gracillariidae
- Genus: Caloptilia
- Species: C. acerifoliella

Binomial name
- Caloptilia acerifoliella (Chambers, 1875)

= Caloptilia acerifoliella =

Species of moth

Caloptilia acerifoliella is a moth of the family Gracillariidae. It is known from the United States (Colorado and Utah).

The larvae feed on Acer species, including Acer glabrum and Acer grandidentatum. They mine the leaves of their host plant.
