= Snow-on-the-mountain =

Snow-on-the-mountain may refer to:

- Euphorbia marginata, a plant of the genus Euphorbia that is native to the United States
- Camellia sasanqua 'Mine-no-Yuki', a cultivar of the shrub Camellia sasanqua
- Aegopodium podagraria
