= Honey Creek State Natural Area =

Nature preserve in Texas, US

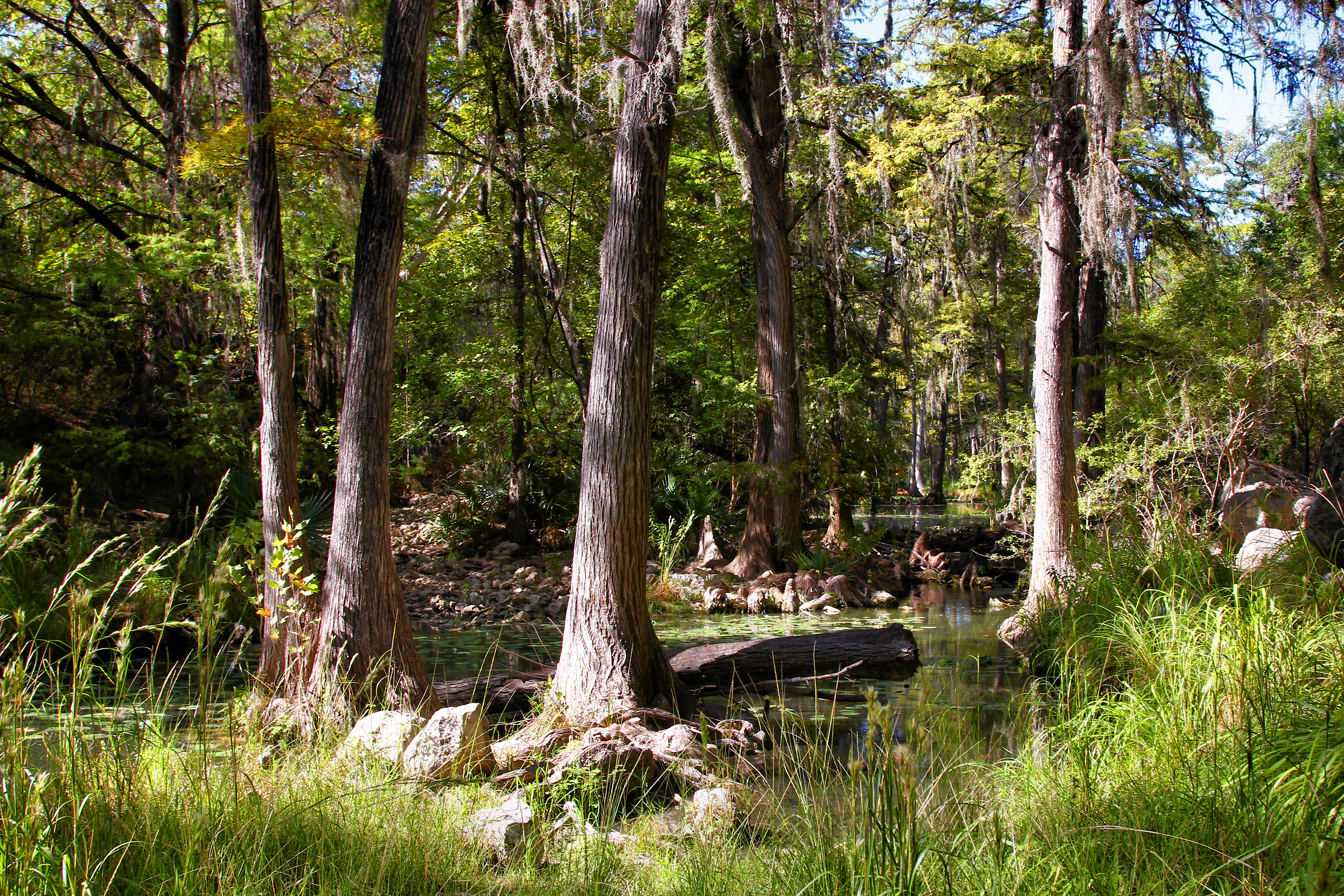
- Honey Creek State Natural Area

- Location within Texas Location within the United States
- Location: Comal County
- Nearest city: Bulverde, Texas
- Coordinates: 29°51′48″N 98°29′24″W
- Area: 2,809 acres (1,137 ha)
- Established: 1985
- Governing body: Texas Parks and Wildlife Department

Honey Creek State Natural Area is a 2,809-acre (1,137 ha) nature preserve in western Comal County, Texas, United States. The Texas Parks and Wildlife Department (TPWD) acquired 1,825 acres (739 ha) from the Nature Conservancy in 1985 and 469 acres (190 ha) from a private individual in 1988. TPWD acquired an additional 515 acres (208 ha) in 2023. Honey Creek opened in 1985 with access by guided tour only. Since Honey Creek is designated a "Natural Area" rather than a "State Park", the Texas Parks and Wildlife Department's first priority is the maintenance and preservation of the property's natural state.

== Flora and fauna ==
The dry rocky uplands are dominated by Ashe juniper, live oak, agarita and Texas persimmon. Cedar elm, Spanish oak, pecan, walnut and Mexican buckeye are found nearer the creek bed. In the floodplain, the dominant trees are sycamore and bald cypress. Texas palmetto, columbine and maidenhair fern grow along the banks of the creek.

Many of the typical animals found in the Texas Hill Country reside in Honey Creek, including wild turkeys, Eastern fence lizards, armadillos and leopard frogs. Some of the more unusual species include Cagle's map turtle, Guadalupe bass (the Texas state fish), four-lined skink, green kingfisher and the Texas salamander. In addition, Honey Creek is one of the nesting sites of the endangered golden-cheeked warbler.
