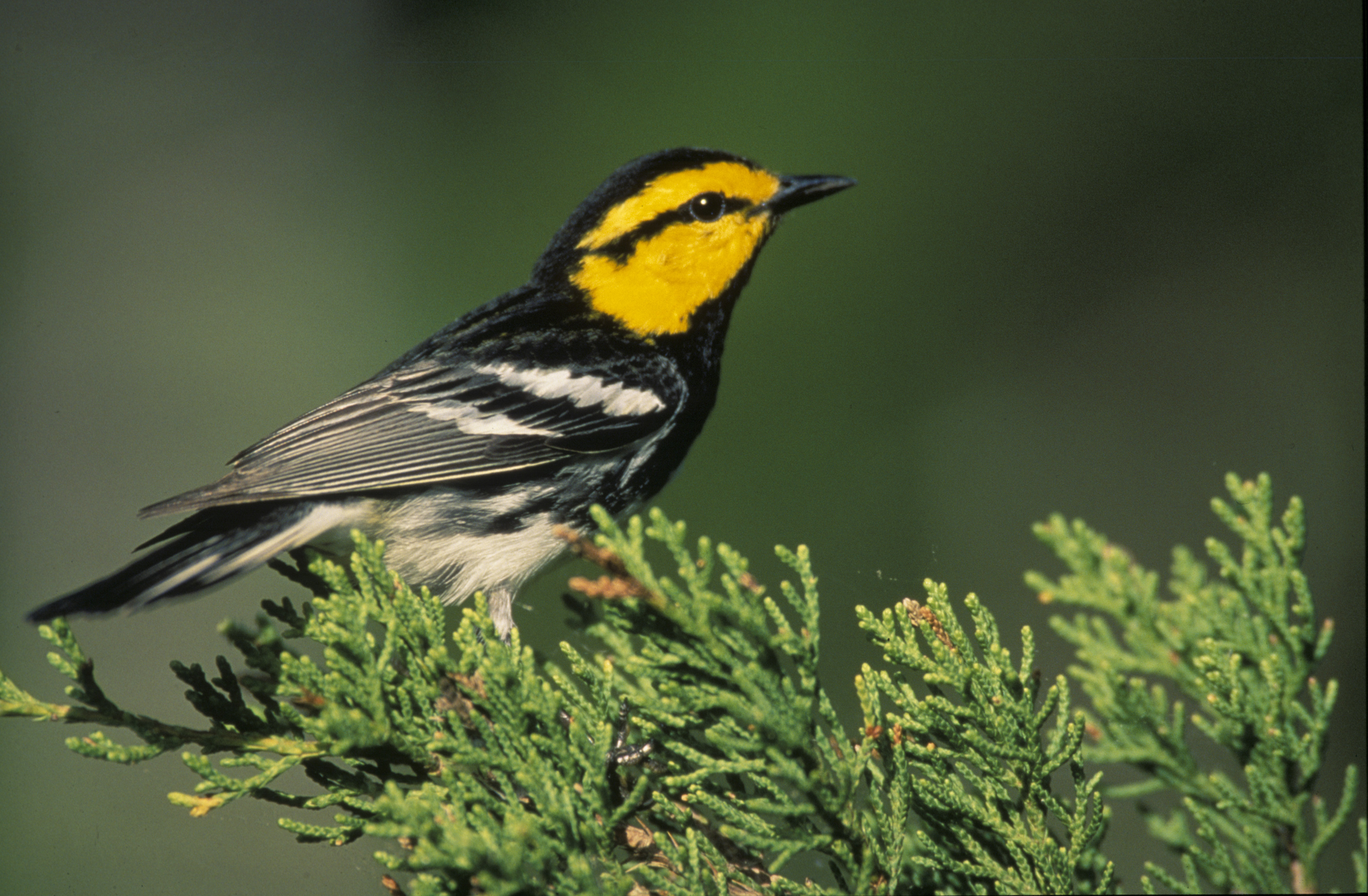

Conservation status
- Endangered (IUCN 3.1)

- Imperiled (NatureServe)

Scientific classification
- Kingdom: Animalia
- Phylum: Chordata
- Class: Aves
- Order: Passeriformes
- Family: Parulidae
- Genus: Setophaga
- Species: S. chrysoparia

Binomial name
- Setophaga chrysoparia (Sclater, PL & Salvin, 1860)
- Range of S. chrysoparia Breeding range Winter range

Synonyms
- Dendroica chrysoparia Sclater & Salvin, 1861

= Golden-cheeked warbler =

Species of bird

The golden-cheeked warbler (Setophaga chrysoparia) is an endangered species of bird that breeds in Central Texas, from Palo Pinto County southwestward along the eastern and southern edge of the Edwards Plateau to Kinney County. The golden-cheeked warbler is the only bird species with a breeding range endemic to Texas.

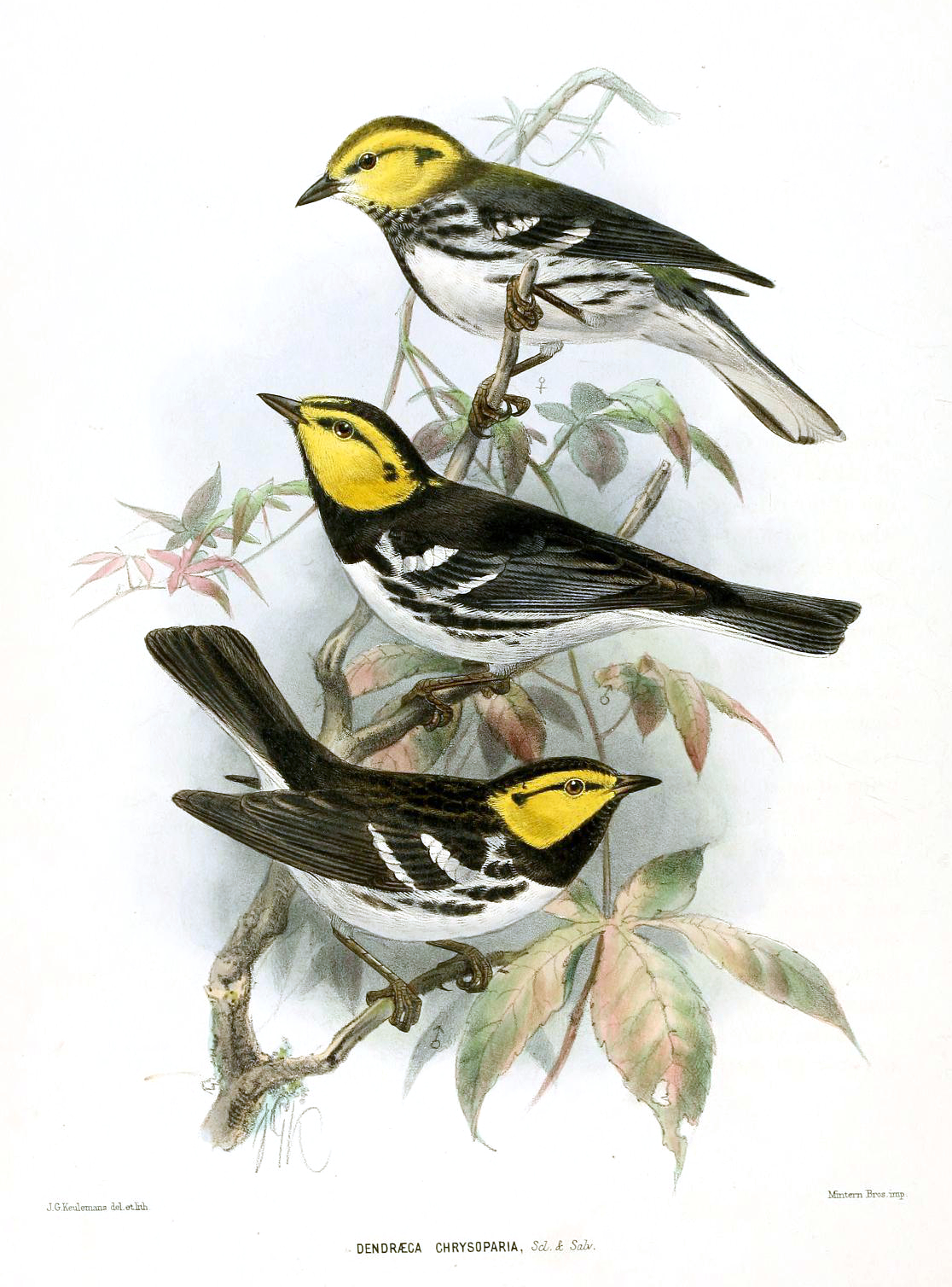
Print by John Gerrard Keulemans, 1890

== Description ==
The golden-cheeked warbler is very striking due to its bright yellow cheeks that are contrasted by its black throat and back. It is also identified by its unique buzzing song emerging from the wooded canyons where it breeds. Golden-cheeked warblers breed in 33 counties in central Texas and are dependent on ashe juniper (blueberry juniper or cedar) for their fine bark strips used as nesting material.

== Distribution and habitat ==
The golden-cheeked warbler can be found in numerous state parks within Texas. These parks include Colorado Bend State Park (SP), Dinosaur Valley SP, Garner SP, Guadalupe River SP, Honey Creek State Natural Area (SNA), Hill Country SNA, Kerr Management Area, Longhorn Cavern SP, Lost Maples SNA, Meridian SP, Pedernales Falls SP, Possum Kingdom SP, and South Llano River SP.

The golden-cheeked warbler is endemic to Texas and Mexico. Their habitat can range from moist, to dry areas around central and southern Texas. The nesting habitat in the further moist realms can be discovered in tall, closed canopy, compressed, mature stands of ashe juniper (Juniperus ashei) trees along with Texas, shin, live, lacey, and post oak trees. In the drier spheres of Texas, golden-cheeked warblers can be found in upland juniper-oak woodlands off of flat topography. They use ashe juniper bark and spider webs to build their nests. Females lay three to four eggs. When migration and winter hits the habitat stays relatively similar: a variety of short-lived evergreen forests with pines between 3,300 and 8,300 feet.

=== Migration ===
Golden-cheeked warblers will only remain in Texas for the breeding season, from March to June. They will migrate with other songbird species along Mexico's Sierra Madre Oriental. By the first week of March, the warblers will return to Texas to breed. During the winter season (November–February), warblers will travel to Guatemala, Nicaragua, Honduras, and Mexico.

== Behavior ==
Golden-cheeked warblers only nest in Texas, primarily in juniper trees. However, they have also been found to nest in oak trees and cedar elms. During the winter, warblers seek warmth in Mexico and northern Central America.

After winter habitation, adult male warblers beat their population back to central nesting grounds by about 5 days in order to prepare competing for the attention of female warblers. Male warblers win attention of the females through their "chip" sounds which they also make as a warning call during times of possible danger.

Though male warblers are found either singing or searching for food, females carry the responsibility of nest building as well as keeping the eggs incubated. Warblers only nest once per season, laying between three and four eggs each time, which take an average of twelve days to hatch. Female warblers are considered shy and go more unnoticed compared to the always-singing males.

Warblers typically forage by grabbing insects from foliage and branches (foraging strategy known as gleaning), and by resting at branch edges until the opportunity to snatch insects that fly past (strategy known as sallying).

=== Diet and feeding ===
The golden-cheeked warbler is known to feed on various forms of insects and spiders, caterpillars are also noted as a primary source of food during the breeding season. This species is completely insectivorous. The method for catching insects is by plucking them from all surfaces by being able to reach them through flight.

=== Breeding ===
Once a female has chosen a mate, she alone builds the nest. The nest is made of strips of juniper bark, rootlets, grasses, cobwebs, cocoons, and can contain animal fur to line to the outer portions of the nest. Nearly all of warbler nests contain juniper bark, and it has been seen that females do not make a nest without the presence of the bark. Golden-cheeked warblers lay 3–4 creamy-white eggs, less than 3/4 inch (1.9 cm) long and 1/2 inch (1.3 cm) wide. Incubation begins one day before the last egg is laid. For approximately the 12 days, the female warbler incubates the eggs. The male may accompany the female when she feeds away from the nest, but does not otherwise aid its partner.

== Conservation ==
The occupied breeding range of the warbler is only about 1,768 square kilometres (437,000 acres), so spaces for habitation are limited. Many spots of warbler habitation have been cleared for the construction of houses, roads, and stores or to grow crops or grass for livestock. Juniper trees, the primary nesting place for warblers, have also been cut down and used for different timber products, especially before the 1940s. Other woodlands were flooded when large lakes were constructed. Sitting at the top of the endangered list (of species in North America) since May 1990, different projects are currently underway to restore the habitat of the golden-cheeked warbler. Efforts include The Safe Harbor agreement between Environmental Defense and the U.S. Fish and Wildlife Service, with the goal of rebuilding and creating new, safe habitats for the warbler (along with other endangered species). The Balcones Canyonlands Conservation Plan (BCCP) is another project responsible for building warbler preserves, with the goal of eventually adding a total of 41,000 acres to the warbler's habitat. These initiatives along with many others encourage landowners to learn more about the warbler (along with other species that inhabit their property) so local land owners may provide proper maintenance and protection of the warbler's habitat. A project that significantly aided habitat restoration for the warbler includes the U.S. Army's success at Fort Hood in protecting the largest patch of juniper-oak trees.

=== Population ===
The most serious problems that are facing the golden-cheeked warbler today are the habitats that are being lost and destroyed due to their limited and specific habitat requirements. Between the years of 1962 and 1974, the population estimated to an 8 to 12% drop. Based on intensive surveys and observations, it was counted that in 2015, there were 716 singing males within 39 acres in Texas.

=== Threats ===
The main direct threat towards the golden-cheeked warbler is the rapid loss of habitats. Their specific habitat needs place warblers at an extremely vulnerable position where urban development has taken a significant amount of the available habitat away. Over-browsing by white-tailed deer, goats, and other ungulates are also believed to be a source of habitat destruction, as they decrease the survival rate of seedling oaks and other deciduous trees, which are a key habitat for warblers. Furthermore, the brown-headed cowbird (which is a brood parasite that lays eggs in other nests, then abandons the nest) and its impact on the golden-cheeked warbler population is still being studied. Blue jays will also depredate Golden-cheeked warbler nests. Of four noted warbler nests in the Wild Basin in Texas all four were depredated by bluejays. Consequently, the survival rate of juvenile Golden-cheeked Warblers is substantially diminished.

== Ecology ==
The golden-cheeked warbler breeds in the juniper-oak woodlands. The bird starts to build its nest about 16–23 feet in the air around the end of March out of ashe juniper bark. The male warbler will use song and physical abuse against other males to establish a territory in close proximity to the previous year's territory. Warblers will stay with only one mate for the entirety of the breeding season. The female will produce 3–4 white eggs that are covered with brown and purple dots that will hatch 10–12 days later. The hatchlings grow rapidly and will leave the nest after 9–12 days. The family will stay together in their territory for up to a month, after which the hatchlings will become independent.

== In popular culture ==
In 2023 the golden-cheeked warbler was featured on a United States Postal Service Forever stamp as part of the Endangered Species set, based on a photograph from Joel Sartore's Photo Ark. The stamp was dedicated at a ceremony at the National Grasslands Visitor Center in Wall, South Dakota.

As part of an initiative to raise awareness for endangered animals within the continental US, Frontier Airlines debuted a golden-cheeked warbler on the aircraft livery of an Airbus 321 in 2024.

== See also ==
- Balcones Canyonlands National Wildlife Refuge
- Government Canyon State Natural Area
