= Black persimmon =

Black persimmon can refer to two dark-fruited species of the persimmon and ebony genus Diospyros:

- Diospyros nigra (Black sapote) from Central America
- Diospyros texana (Texas persimmon) from the lower Rio Grande region of Texas and Mexico
