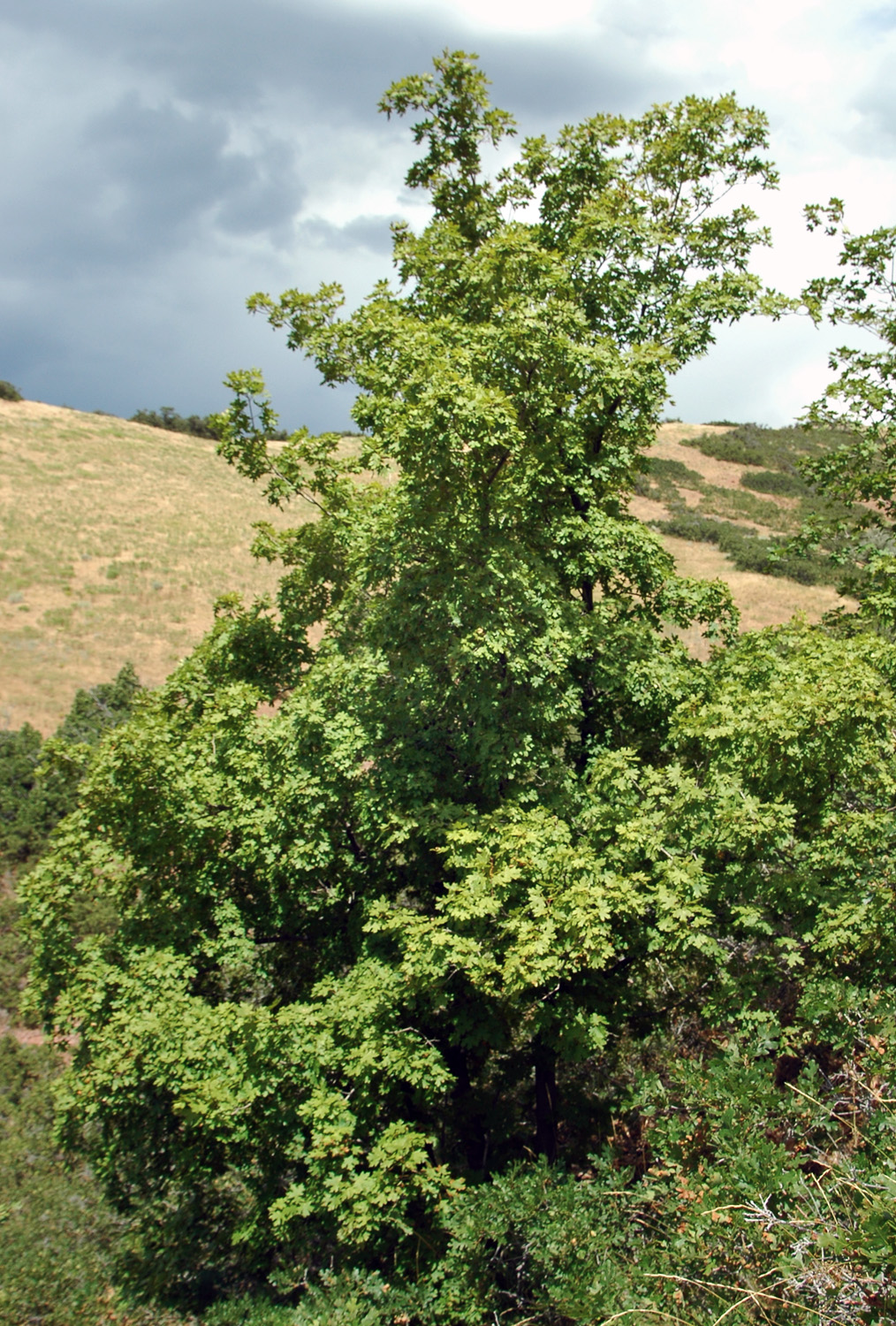
- Bigtooth maple, Wasatch Mountains, Utah

Conservation status
- Least Concern (IUCN 3.1)

Scientific classification
- Kingdom: Plantae
- Clade: Tracheophytes
- Clade: Angiosperms
- Clade: Eudicots
- Clade: Rosids
- Order: Sapindales
- Family: Sapindaceae
- Genus: Acer
- Section: Acer sect. Acer
- Series: Acer ser. Saccharodendron
- Species: A. grandidentatum

Binomial name
- Acer grandidentatum Nutt.
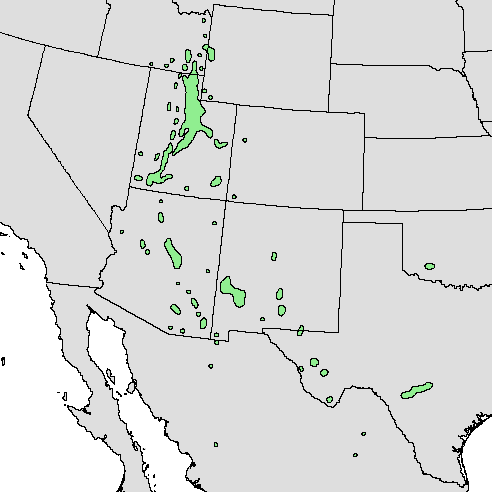
- Generalized natural range

= Acer grandidentatum =

Species of maple

Acer grandidentatum, commonly called bigtooth maple or western sugar maple, is a species of maple native to interior western North America. It occurs in scattered populations from western Montana to central Texas in the United States and south to Coahuila in northern Mexico.

== Description ==
It is a small to medium-sized deciduous tree growing to 10–15 metres (33–49 feet) tall and a trunk of 20–35 centimetres (8–14 inches) diameter. The bark is dark brown to gray, with narrow fissures and flat ridges creating plate-like scales; it is thin and easily damaged. The leaves are opposite, simple, 6–12 cm (2 1/4–4 3/4 in) long and broad, with three to five deep, bluntly-pointed lobes, three of the lobes large and two small ones (not always present) at the leaf base; the three major lobes each have 3–5 small subsidiary lobules. The leaves turn golden yellow to red in autumn (less reliably in warmer areas). In Texas, specimens do not color well if they have a heavy seed year.

The flowers appear with the leaves in mid spring; they are produced in corymbs of 5–15 together, each flower yellow-green, about 4–5 millimetres (3/16–3/16 in) diameter, with no petals. The fruit is a paired samara (two winged seeds joined at the base), green to reddish-pink in color, maturing brown in early fall; each seed is globose, 7–10 mm (1/4–3/8 in) diameter, with a single wing 2–3 cm (3/4–1 1/4 in) long.

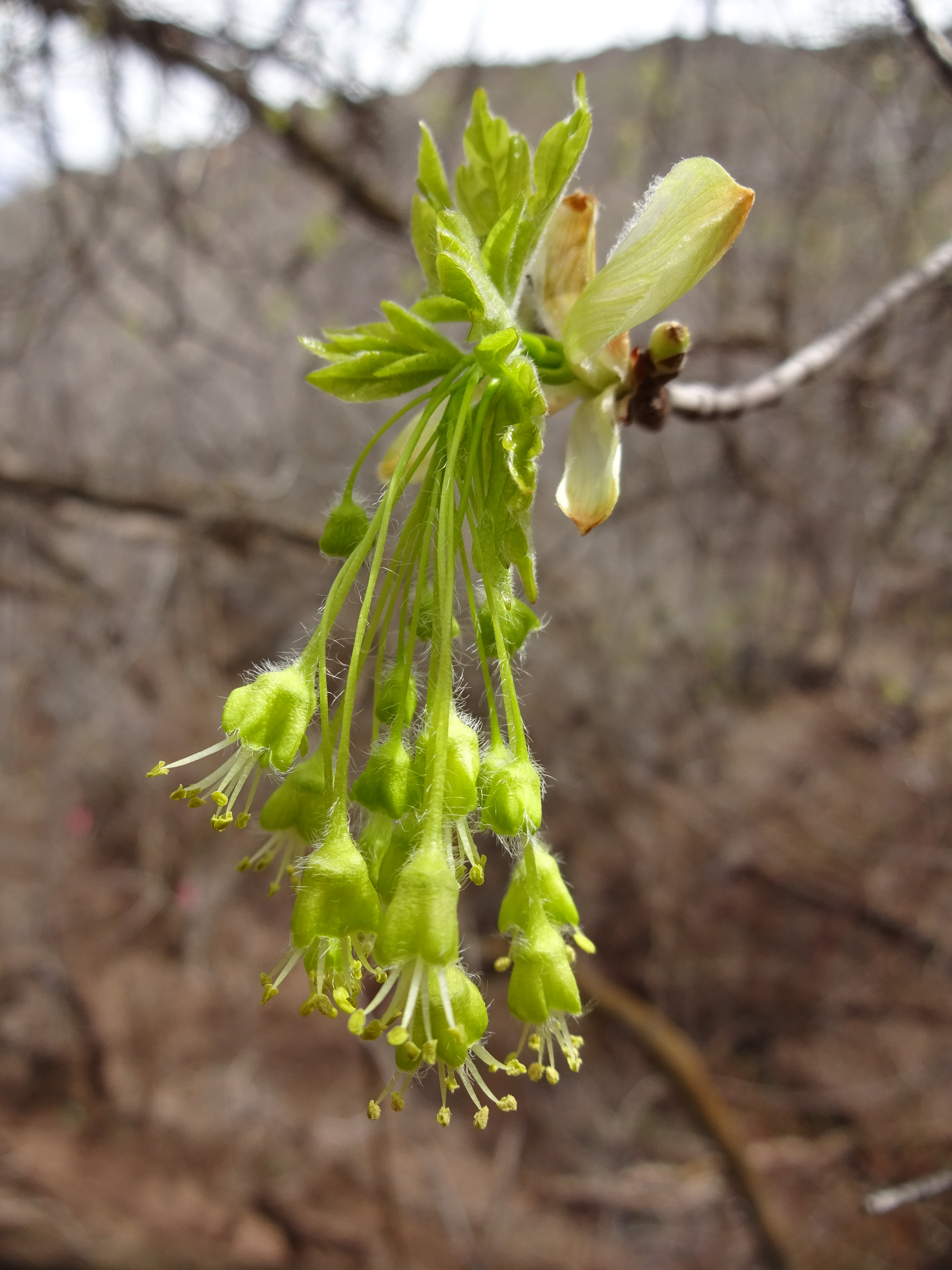
Flowers and emerging spring leaves in early April in Salt Lake County, Utah

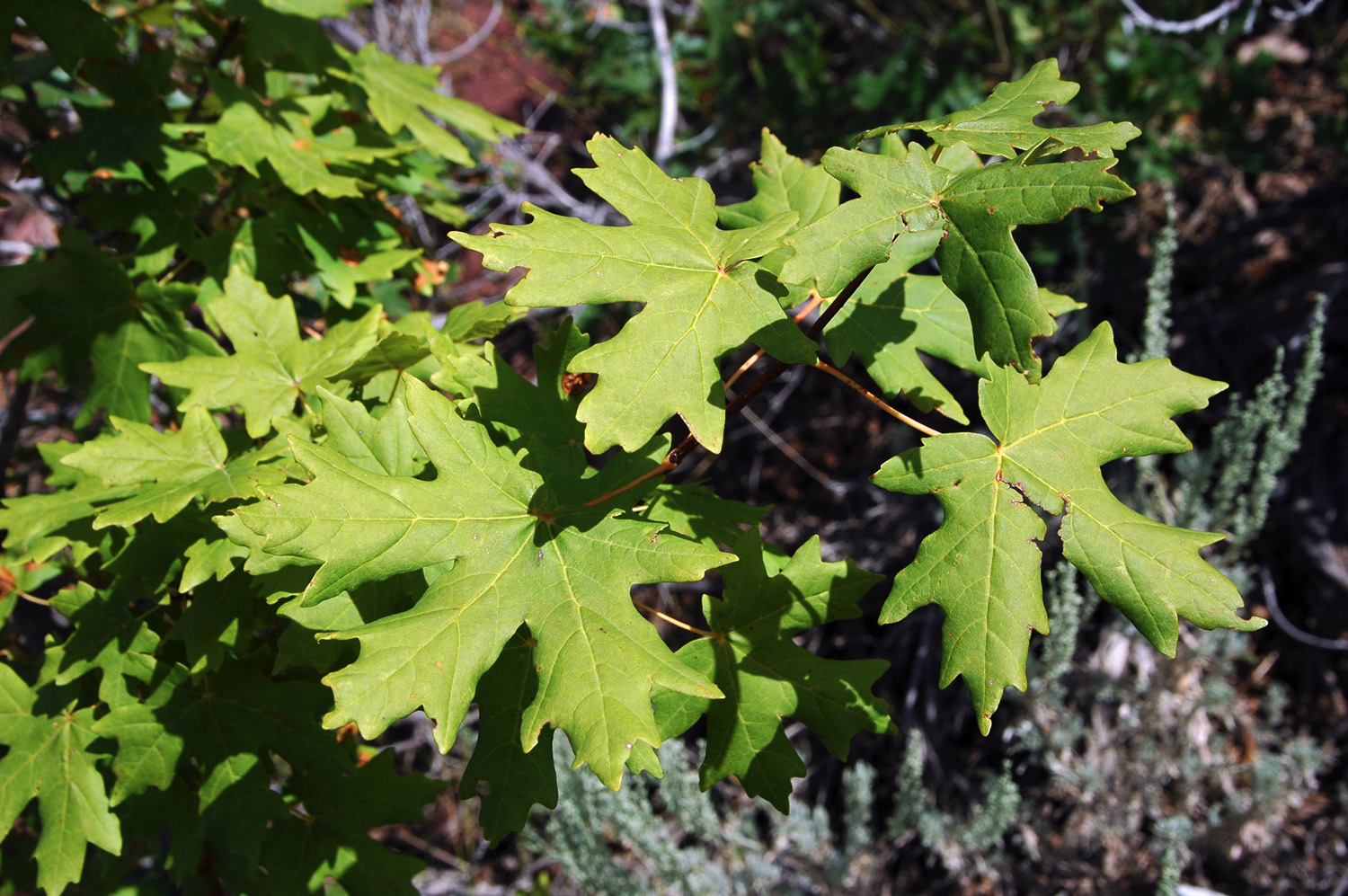
Mature summer leaves in August

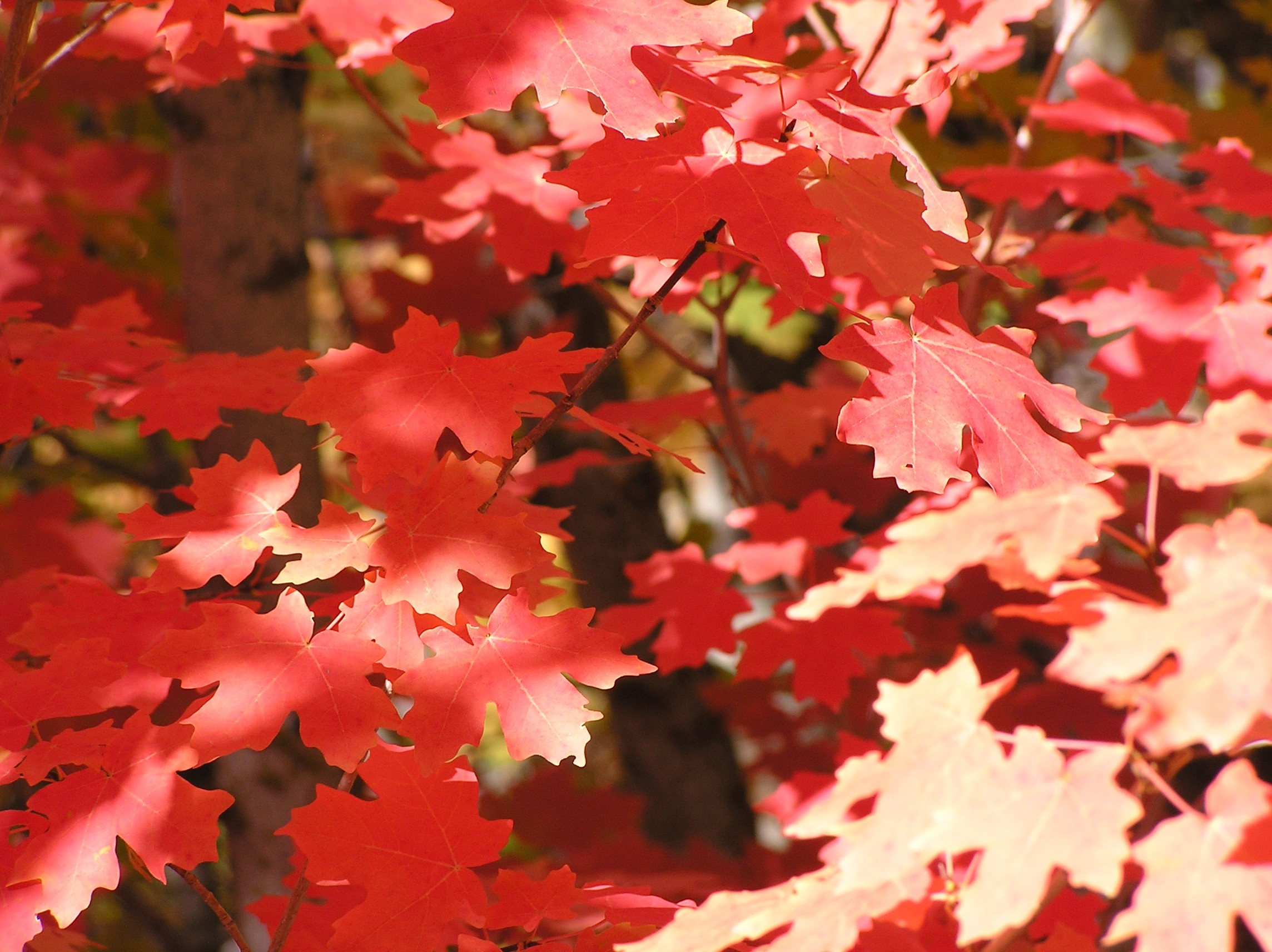
Fall leaf color in late September

== Taxonomy ==
It is closely related to Acer saccharum (sugar maple), and is treated as a subspecies of it by some botanists, as Acer saccharum subsp. grandidentatum (Nutt.) Desmarais.

== Distribution and habitat ==
It grows from the Rocky Mountains in southeast Idaho, through Utah and further south.

It commonly grows in limestone soils but can adapt to a wide range of well-drained soils, from sand to clays to even white limestone areas. It prefers sheltered canyons, valleys, and the banks of mountain streams, primarily at higher elevations but occasionally at lower elevations in disjunct locales such as the southern edge of the Edwards Plateau in Texas and in the Wichita Mountains of southwestern Oklahoma.

== Cultivation ==
Acer grandidentatum is native to interior regions of North America, where it occurs in a variety of climates ranging from semi-arid continental to humid subtropical, particularly in canyons and protected slopes of Texas, New Mexico, and the interior West. While its natural range is concentrated in areas with distinct seasonal variation, cultivated specimens have adapted successfully to a broader range of climates, including the milder maritime conditions of coastal British Columbia. The species grows slowly when young and is relatively free of serious pest or disease issues. It is occasionally planted as an ornamental tree, especially in rocky or drought-prone landscapes, where its compact form and vivid fall coloration are especially valued.

== Uses ==
The sweetish sap is used in western North America to make maple sugar.

== See also ==
- Lost Maples State Natural Area
