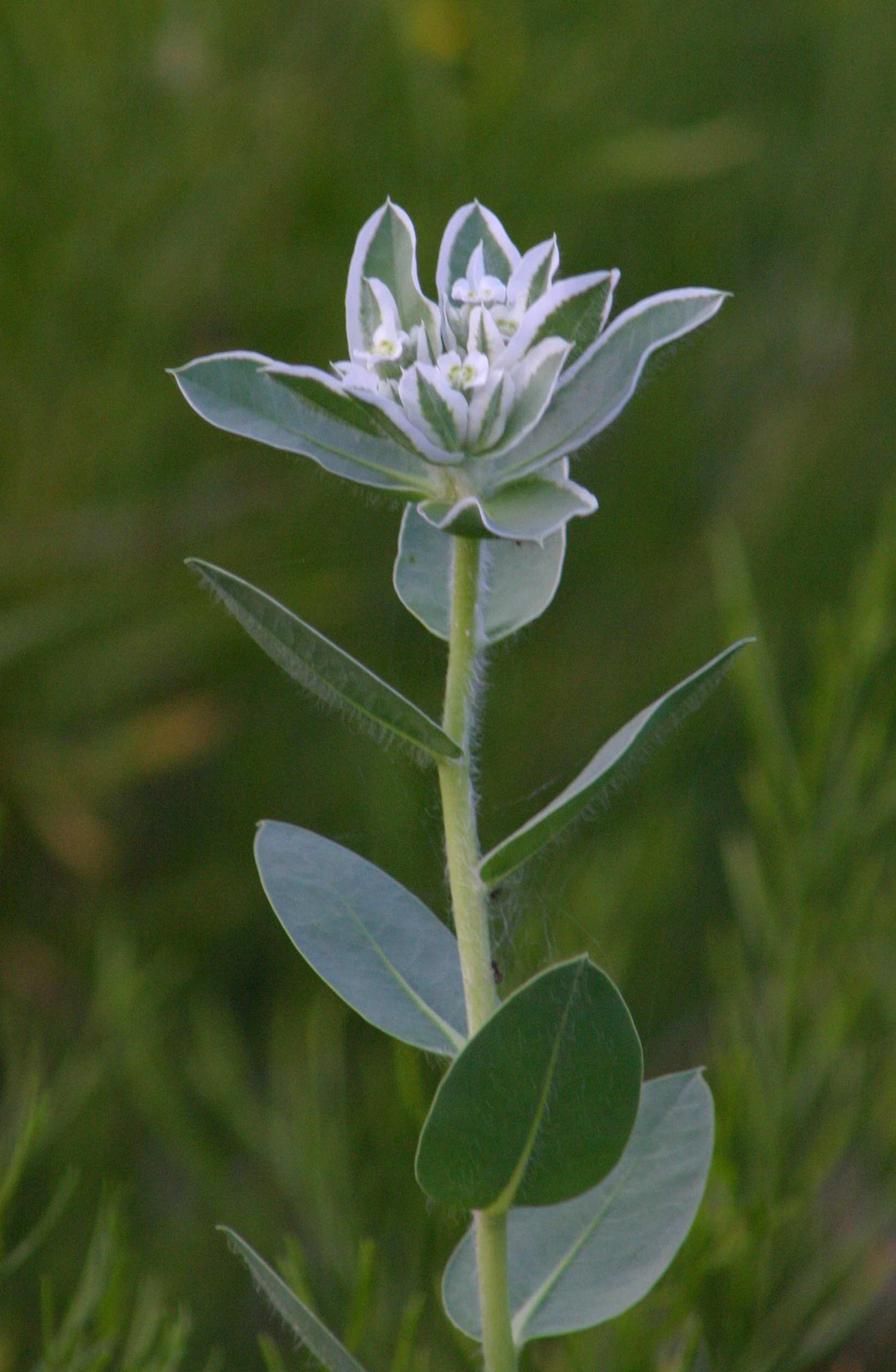
- Snow-on-the-mountain, Wichita Mountains Wildlife Refuge

Conservation status
- Secure (NatureServe)

Scientific classification
- Kingdom: Plantae
- Clade: Tracheophytes
- Clade: Angiosperms
- Clade: Eudicots
- Clade: Rosids
- Order: Malpighiales
- Family: Euphorbiaceae
- Genus: Euphorbia
- Species: E. marginata

Binomial name
- Euphorbia marginata Pursh

= Euphorbia marginata =

Species of flowering plant

Euphorbia marginata (commonly known as snow-on-the-mountain, smoke-on-the-prairie, variegated spurge, or whitemargined spurge) is a small annual in the spurge family.

It is native to parts of temperate North America, from Eastern Canada to the Southwestern United States. It is naturalized throughout much of China.

The type specimen was collected in Rosebud County, Montana from the area of the Yellowstone River by William Clark during the Lewis and Clark Expedition.

== Description ==
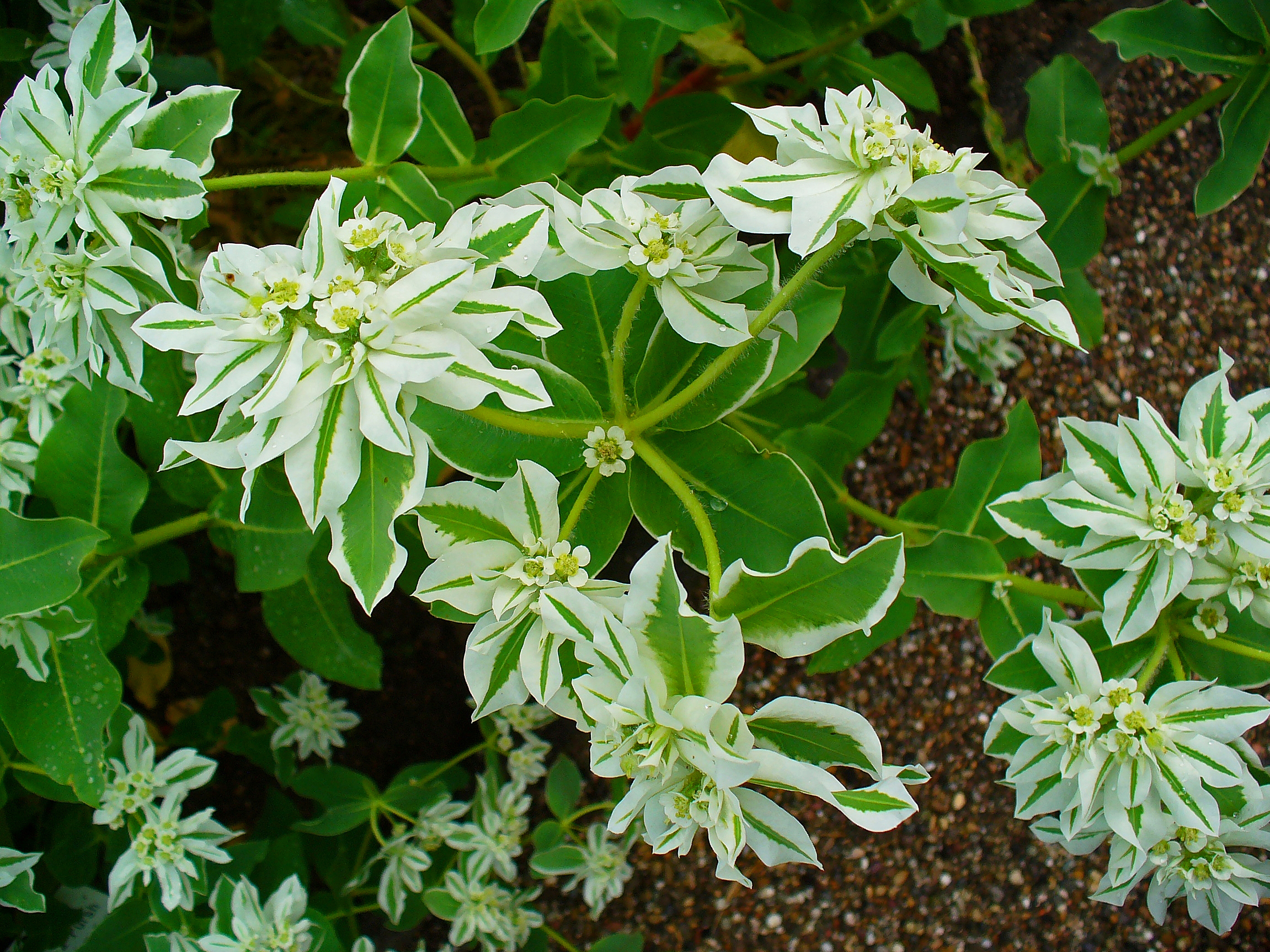
Euphorbia marginata

Snow-on-the-mountain has grey-green leaves along branches and smaller leaves (bracts or cyathophylls) in terminal whorls with edges trimmed with wide white bands, creating, together with the white flowers, the appearance that gives the plant its common names.

Snow-on-the-mountain has also been found to emit large quantities of sulfur gas, mainly in the form of dimethyl sulfide (DMS).
