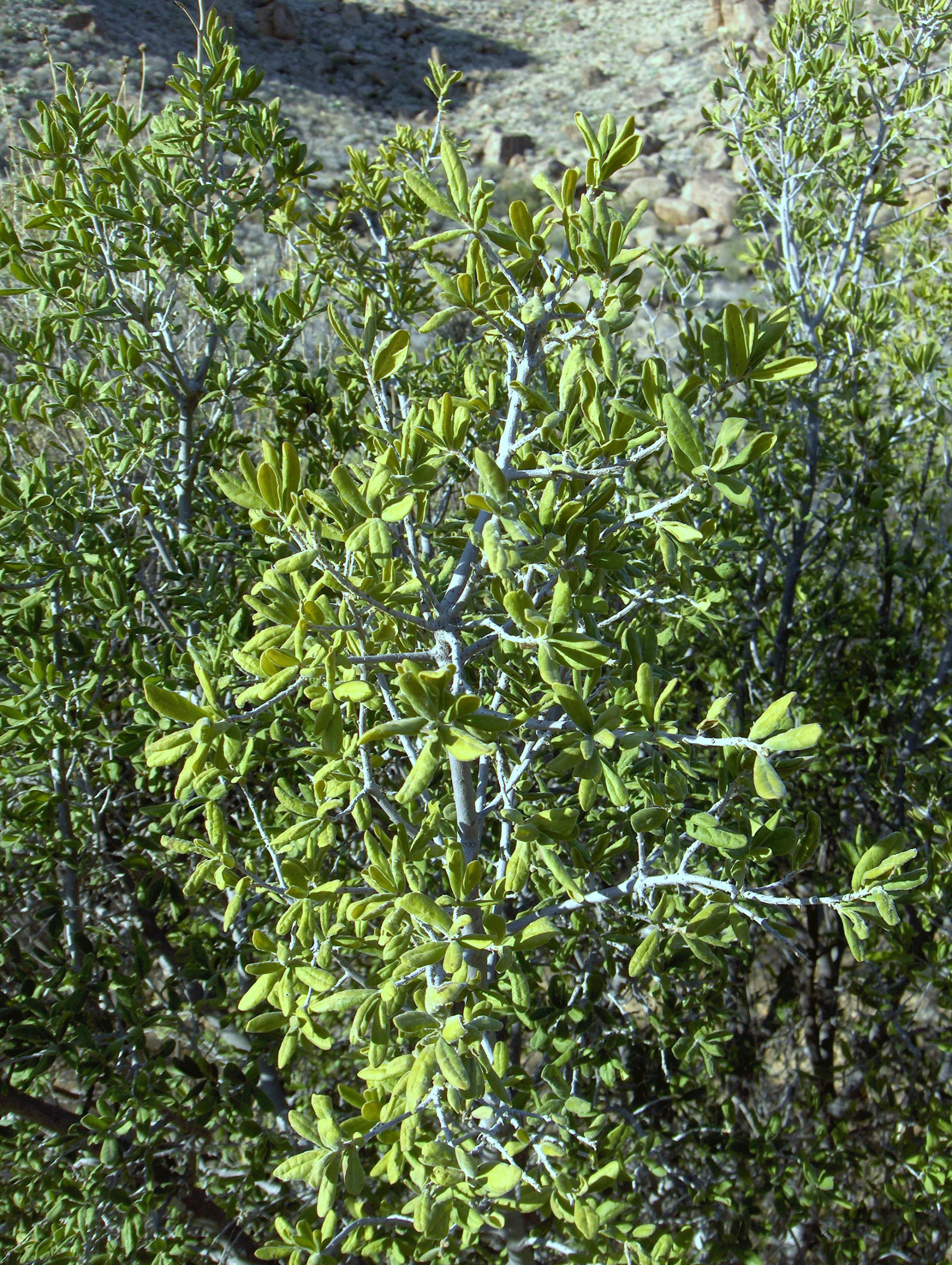

Scientific classification
- Kingdom: Plantae
- Clade: Tracheophytes
- Clade: Angiosperms
- Clade: Eudicots
- Clade: Asterids
- Order: Ericales
- Family: Ebenaceae
- Genus: Diospyros
- Species: D. texana

Binomial name
- Diospyros texana Scheele
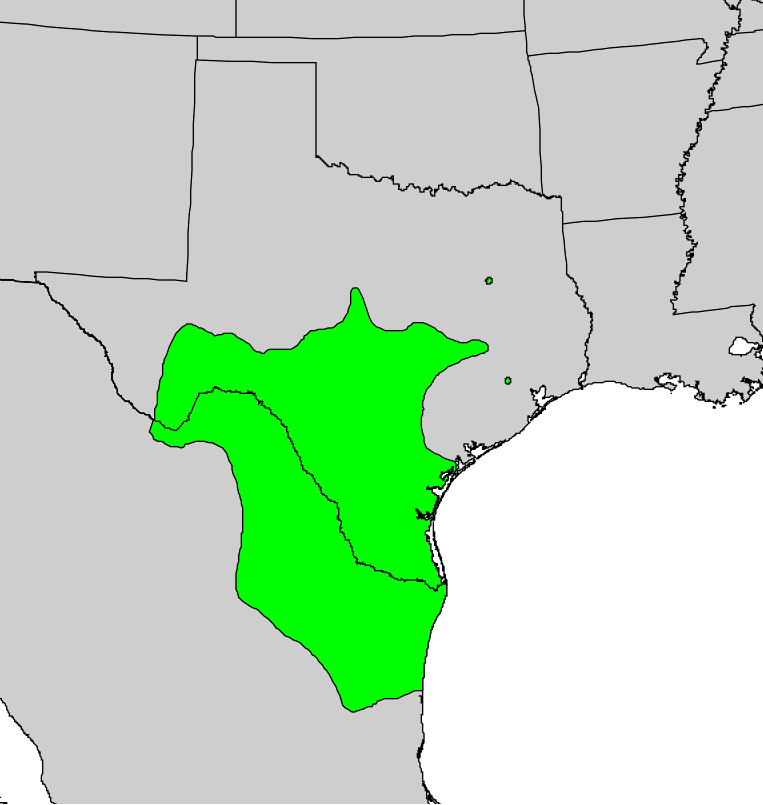
- Natural range

= Diospyros texana =

Species of tree

Diospyros texana is a species of persimmon that is native to central, south and west Texas and southwest Oklahoma in the United States, and eastern Chihuahua, Coahuila, Nuevo León, and Tamaulipas in northeastern Mexico. Common names include Texas persimmon, Mexican persimmon and the more ambiguous "black persimmon". It is known in Spanish as chapote, chapote manzano, or chapote prieto, all of which are derived from the Nahuatl word tzapotl. That word also refers to several other fruit-bearing trees.

== Description ==
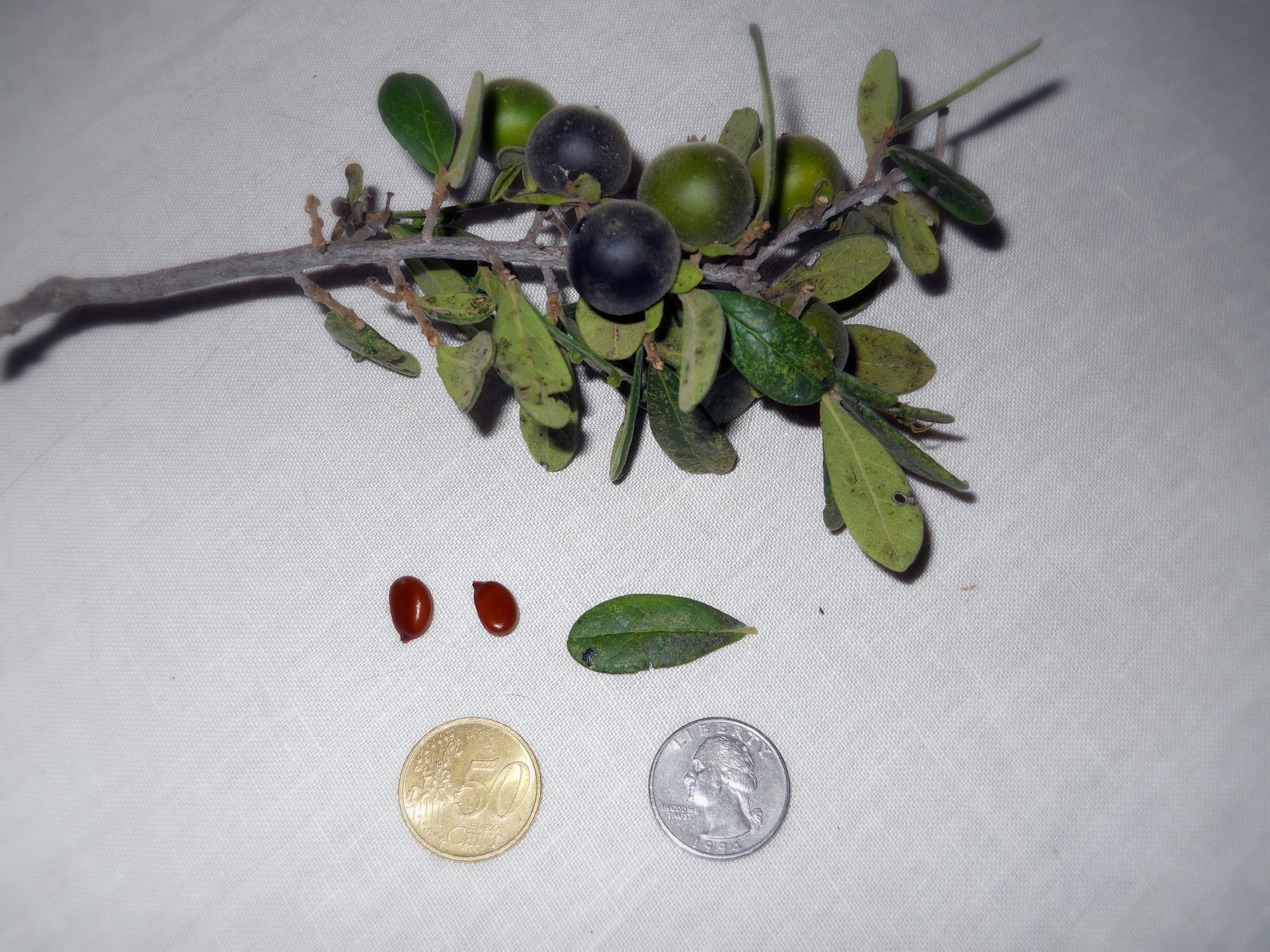
The seeds, leaves, bark, ripe, and unripe fruit of the persimmon.

Diospyros texana is a multi-trunked small tree or large shrub with a lifespan of 30 to 50 years. It usually grows to 3 m (9.8 ft) in height, but can reach 12 m (39 ft) when growing in understories among larger trees. The bark is smooth and light reddish gray and peels away from mature trees to reveal shades of pink, white, and gray on the trunk.

=== Leaves ===
The sclerophyllus leaves are obovate, dark green, 2–5 cm (0.79–1.97 in) long and 1–3 cm (0.39–1.18 in) wide. Apexes are obtuse to emarginate. Upper surfaces are glossy while lower surfaces are covered in fine hairs and lack basilaminar glands. Leaves are attached to 0.1–0.5 cm (0.039–0.197 in) petioles. Trees are deciduous in the north of their range and become evergreen further south.

=== Flowers ===
Diospyros texana is dioecious (separate male and female trees) and produces flowers starting in March or April. The flowers are white, urn shaped, and 0.8–1.6 cm (0.31–0.63 in) wide. They have five sepals, five petals, 16 stamens, and four styles. Flowers are solitary or form on cymes of two to three.

=== Fruit ===
The fruits of D. texana are black, subglobose berries with a diameter of 1.5–2.5 cm (0.59–0.98 in) that ripen in August. Berries contain three to eight light red, triangular seeds around 0.8 cm (0.31 in) in length.

== Habitat ==
Texas persimmon can be found at elevations from sea level to 1,800 m (5,900 ft). It inhabits the Edwards Plateau the Chihuahuan Desert, the southern third of the Western Gulf coastal grasslands, the Tamaulipan mezquital, and the Tamaulipan matorral. Throughout its range, D. texana favors riparian zones, prairie margins, and rocky slopes. It prefers well-drained, alkaline soils.

== Uses ==
The sapwood of Texas persimmon is clear yellow, while the heartwood, found only in very large trees, is black (ebony), like that of the related D. ebenum. The heartwood is hard and dense and takes a high polish. It is used to make engraving blocks, artwork, and tools. The fleshy berries are edible and sweet when ripe and are used in puddings and custards; they are also relished by many species of birds and mammals. However, they are astringent when unripe.

They were traditionally used by Native Americans to make a black dye for animal hides and are still used for this purpose in Mexico. The small size, peeling bark, intricate branching, and drought tolerance of D. texana make it useful as an ornamental.

== Ecology ==
Diospyros texana is a host plant for the caterpillars of the grey hairstreak (Strymon melinus) and Henry's elfin (Callophrys henrici)
