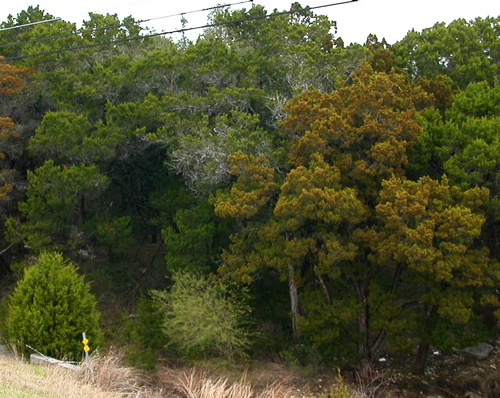
- J. ashei shedding pollen: mature male on right, immature tree on left, mature green females in background

Conservation status
- Least Concern (IUCN 3.1)

Scientific classification
- Kingdom: Plantae
- Clade: Tracheophytes
- Clade: Gymnosperms
- Division: Pinophyta
- Class: Pinopsida
- Order: Cupressales
- Family: Cupressaceae
- Genus: Juniperus
- Species: J. ashei

Binomial name
- Juniperus ashei J. Buchholz
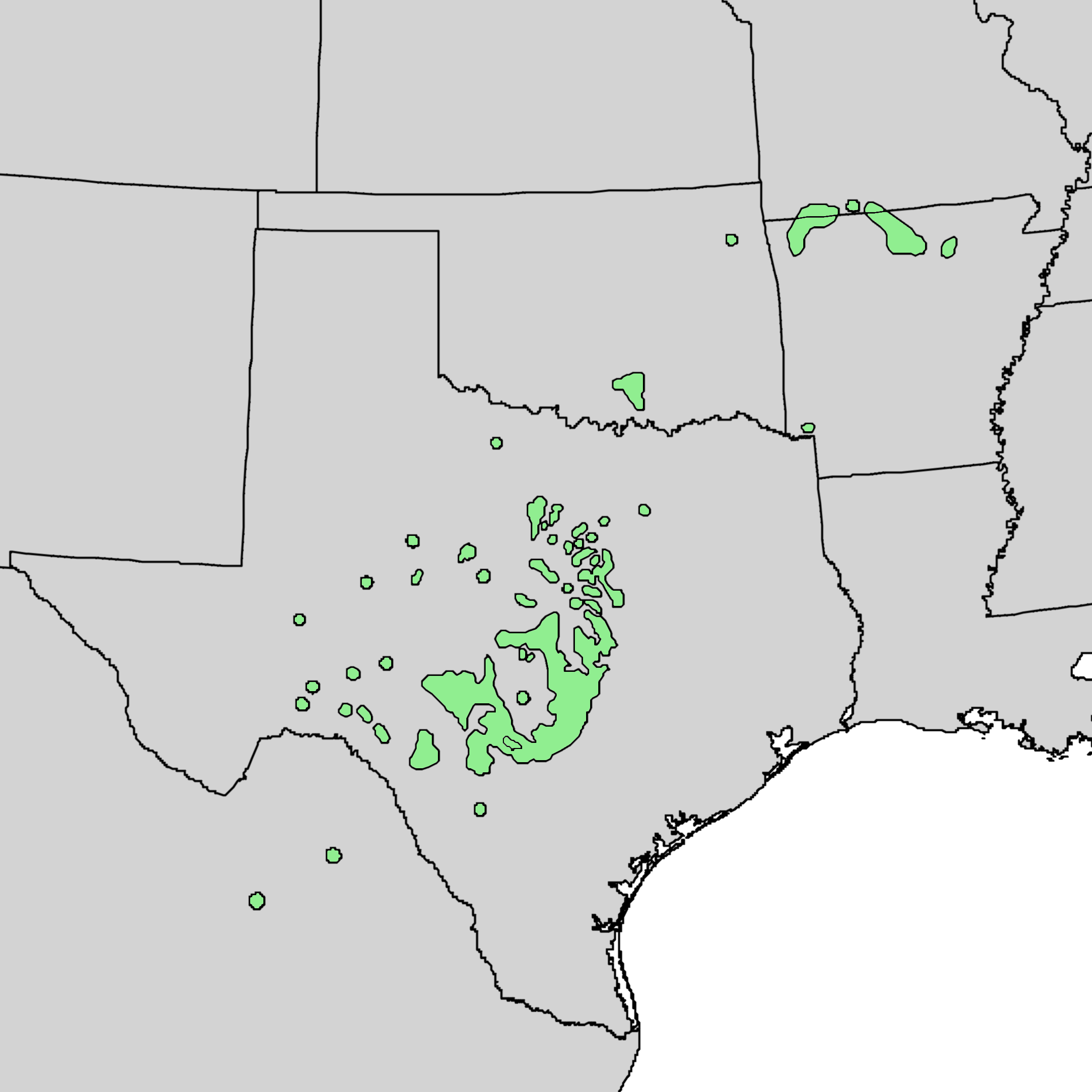
- Natural range of Juniperus ashei

Synonyms
- J. sabinoides (H.B.K.) Nees sensu Sargent; J. mexicana Spreng; J. monticola Martinez; Sabina sabinoides (H.B.K.) Small

= Juniperus ashei =

Species of conifer

Juniperus ashei (Ashe juniper, mountain cedar, blueberry juniper, post cedar, or just cedar) is a drought-tolerant evergreen tree, native from northeastern Mexico and the south-central United States to southern Missouri. The largest areas are in central Texas, where extensive stands occur. Ashe juniper grows up to 10 metres (33 feet) tall, and over time can reach 15 m (49 ft), and provides erosion control and year-round shade for wildlife and livestock.

== Description ==
The feathery foliage grows in dense sprays, bright green in color. The leaves are scale-like, 2 to 5 millimetres (1/16 to 3/16 inch) long, and produced on rounded (not flattened) shoots. It is a dioecious species, with separate male and female plants. The seed cones are round, 3 to 5 mm (1/8 to 3/16 in) long, and soft, pulpy and berry-like, green at first, maturing purple about 8 months after pollination. They contain one or two seeds, which are dispersed when birds eat the cones and pass the seeds in their droppings. The male cones are 3–5 mm long, yellow, turning brown after pollen release in December to February.

== Scientific name ==
The specific name ashei pays homage to American forester and botanist William Willard Ashe.

== As an invasive species ==
Despite being native to Texas, ashe juniper is often considered an invasive species and weed by many landowners and ranchers. It is commonly believed that they use more water than live oaks, but more recent research suggests the reverse.

Ashe juniper thrives on ranches, as cattle avoid the bitter-tasting seedlings. In contrast to the redberry juniper, ashe juniper does not resprout when cut.

== Allergens ==
Ashe juniper pollen, along with that of the related Juniperus virginiana, can cause a severe allergic reaction. Consequently, what begins as a winter allergy may extend into spring, as the pollination of J. virginiana follows that of J. ashei. Colloquially, many Texans refer to the allergy as cedar fever.

== Uses ==
Spanish explorers who arrived in what is now Texas in the mid-18th century built Hill Country missions using ashe junipers for roof beams. Poor land management, due to decades of clearcutting and overgrazing, led to soil erosion and a preponderance of caliche. The ashe juniper was one of the few plants that could thrive in the rocky soil.

The wood is naturally rot-resistant and provides raw material for fence posts. Posts cut from old-growth Ashe junipers have been known to last in the ground for more than 50 years. Over 100 years ago, most old-growth Ashe junipers were cut and used not only for fence posts, but also for foundation piers, telegraph and telephone poles, roof framing, and railroad ties.

The berry-like cones are eaten by a number of wildlife. The endangered golden-cheeked warbler uses the shredding bark of older Mountain Cedars to build its nests and old-growth cedar brakes and juniper-oak woodlands as habitat.
