= Alanreed Independent School District =

School district in Texas, 1917–1993

Alanreed Independent School District was a public school district based in the community of Alanreed, Texas established in 1917.

The community was within the Texas Panhandle region of West Texas, 50 miles east of Amarillo. Its motto was "When you have to give up, what do you have left? Nothing".

== History ==
Alenreed ISD was established in 1917 by an act of the 35th Texas Legislature.

It consolidated with the McClellan and Elridge school districts. In 1936, it had an enrollment of 220 and ran a four-year high school.

In 1990, it ranked the 32nd wealthiest school district in Texas.

As a result of the implementation of financial reforms to aid disproportionate funding between districts such as county education districts, requirements teachers be paid a standardized minimum wage regardless of workload, changes to how tax is raised, and the allocation of funds, the district considered consolidating with other surrounding small school districts, namely Lefors, McLean and the now-defunct Mobeetie Independent School District, for financial purposes. As the four districts spanned a combined six counties, proposing the change across county lines proved a challenge and killed the movement. If the effort had been successful, a proposed Northfolk Independent School District would be formed in July 1992.

=== Closing ===
By the second semester of the 1993–1994 school year, the district had a decreasing number of students: 28 in 1991, 19 in 1992, and 13 in 1993. The superintendent and district tax accessor and collector reported actual enrollment to be at 10 students through the 8th grade while high school students were attended McLean High School.

On January 16, 1993, voters decided to abolish the district.

Alanreed ISD maintained a balanced budget, it had no surplus due to the redistribution of funds by the county education district instituted by the state Robin Hood plan, which had collected nearly $175,000 but only given the ISD just above $56,000 despite the district being property-rich with oil and natural gas operations within its boundaries.

Donley and Gray counties' commissioners courts decided which districts would absorb Alanreed ISD's former territory.

The district's only school shut down the same day the district was officially made obsolete on July 1, 1993. Its students were picked up by Lefors ISD.
