= Texas State Highway Loop 237 =

State Highway Loop 237

Route information
- Maintained by TxDOT

Location
- Country: United States
- State: Texas

Highway system
- Highways in Texas; Interstate; US; State; Former; Toll; Loops; Spurs; FM/RM; Park; Rec
← Loop 236	→ Loop 238

Texas State Highway Loop 237 was a state highway designation used twice in the U.S. state of Texas:

- Texas State Highway Loop 237 (pre-1953), former route in Texarkana
- Texas State Highway Loop 237 (1958-1990), now Business I-20 in Roscoe
