= Tommy Duniven =

American football player (born 1954)

No. 11
- Position: Quarterback

Personal information
- Born: May 20, 1954 (age 72); Pampa, Texas, U.S.
- Listed height: 6 ft 3 in (1.91 m)
- Listed weight: 210 lb (95 kg)

Career information
- High school: McLean (McLean, Texas)
- College: Texas Tech
- NFL draft: 1977: 6th round, 160th overall pick

Career history
- Cincinnati Bengals (1977)*; Houston Oilers (1977–1978)
- * Offseason or practice squad member only
- Stats at Pro Football Reference

James Thomas Duniven (born May 20, 1954) is an American former professional football player who was a quarterback in the National Football League (NFL). He played college football for the Texas Tech Red Raiders.

== Early life ==
Duniven was born in Pampa, Texas and grew up in McLean, Texas. He attended McLean High School, where he earned 13 varsity letters. Duniven had hoped to play college football for the Texas Longhorns, but was not recruited by coach Darrell Royal because he was not a wishbone quarterback. He was heavily recruited by Nebraska head coach Tom Osborne, but Duniven did not want to play far from his hometown and signed to play at Texas Tech after considering offers from Oklahoma State and West Texas A&M, where his older brother was player.

== College career ==
Duniven played college football at Texas Tech University and was a member of the Red Raiders for five seasons, redshirting his freshman year. He became the team's starter at quarterback as a redshirt sophomore and led the team in passing with 552 yards and was named the National Back of the Week by the Associated Press after passing for three touchdowns in a 26–3 upset win over Texas. His season was cut short by a back injury. As a junior, Duniven was the Red Raiders leading passer with 72 of 125 passes completed for 1,038 yards with five touchdown passes and six interceptions. As a senior Duniven suffered a season-ending knee injury against Texas A&M.

== Professional career ==
Duniven was selected 160th overall in the sixth round of the 1977 NFL draft by the Cincinnati Bengals. He was waived by the Bengals at the end of training camp and was later signed by the Houston Oilers. Duniven played in a single game for the Oilers during the 1977 season. Duniven was released by the Oilers at the end of training camp the following season.
