= Texas State Highway Loop 288 =

Highway in Texas

State Highway Loop 288
- Loop 288 highlighted in red

Route information
- Maintained by TxDOT
- Length: 10.11 mi (16.27 km)
- Existed: 1955–present

Major junctions
- West end: I-35 northwest of Denton
- US 77; US 377 / US 380
- South end: I-35E / US 77 southeast of Denton

Location
- Country: United States
- State: Texas

Highway system
- Highways in Texas; Interstate; US; State; Former; Toll; Loops; Spurs; FM/RM; Park; Rec
← Loop 287	→ Loop 289

Loop 288 is a state highway in the city of Denton, Texas. The southern portion of the loop has shopping centers, restaurants, and interchanges, while at the north side of the loop, it is rural with side streets, and one traffic light for Kings Row. It was constructed in 1955, and was finished in the 1970s. On the north side of town, the loop runs next to the C. H. Collins Athletic Complex. The road begins at an interchange with Interstate 35 (I-35) on the northwestern corner of Denton and loops around the north, east and southeast sides of the city before ending at another intersection with I-35E adjacent to Denton's shopping mall. Loop 288 is signed as a truck route for traffic traveling east on US Highway 380 (US 380) towards McKinney.

== History ==
Loop 288 was designated on September 21, 1955, from US 77 north to US 380 (then State Highway 24, SH 24). It was designated to only bypass downtown. It was extended westward to I-35W and northward and westward to I-35 on June 9, 1966. On October 21, 1977, the section from I-35E to I-35W was canceled.

On May 29, 1991, another section of Loop 288 was proposed from Farm to Market Road 2181 (FM 2181) to another point on Loop 288. The south portion of the route, will become Spur 288 when the new route of Loop 288 is built. The proposed route would follow new construction from Spencer Road to Colorado Boulevard, Mayhill Road from Colorado Boulevard to I-35 and FM 2499, part of FM 2499 from I-35 to just south of Robinson Road, and new construction (right-of-way had already been acquired for this section) from just south of Robinson Road to FM 2181.

== Future ==
The Texas Department of Transportation (TxDOT) proposed a plan to expand the western end of the loop. The construction of the new route of Loop 288, will begin from I-35, to the western portion of Denton, to I-35W.

== Junction list ==
The entire route is in Denton, Denton County. All exits are unnumbered.

mi	km	Destinations	Notes
0.0	0.0	Lillian Miller Parkway to FM 2181	Continuation south beyond I-35E
0.0	0.0	I-35E / US 77	Southern terminus; I-35E exit 463
2.3	3.7	FM 426 (McKinney Street)	
3.7	6.0	US 380 / US 377 / US 380 Truck east – Denton, McKinney	Southern end of US 380 Truck concurrency; south end of freeway
6.0	9.7	FM 428 (Sherman Drive)	
7.3	11.7	FM 2164 (Locust Street)	
9.2	14.8	US 77 – Denton	
10.1	16.3	I-35 / US 380 Truck west	Western end of US 380 Truck concurrency; western terminus; I-35 northbound exit 470, southbound exit 471
1.000 mi = 1.609 km; 1.000 km = 0.621 mi: Concurrency terminus
