= List of state highway loops in Texas (200–299) =

- Texas State Highway Loop marker

Highway names
- Interstates: Interstate Highway X (IH-X, I-X)
- US Highways: U.S. Highway X (US X)
- State: State Highway X (SH X)
- Loops: Loop X
- Spurs: Spur X
- Farm or Ranch to Market Roads: Farm to Market Road X (FM X); Ranch-to-Market Road X (RM X)
- Park Roads: Park Road X (PR X)

System links
- Highways in Texas; Interstate; US; State; Former; Toll; Loops; Spurs; FM/RM; Park; Rec

State highway loops in Texas are owned and maintained by the Texas Department of Transportation (TxDOT).

== Loop 201 ==
State Highway Loop 201
- Location: Harris County
- Existed: September 23, 1959–March 28, 1996

Loop 201 was located in Baytown.

Loop 201 was designated on September 23, 1959, as a redesignation of Spur 201 when it was extended northeast to SH 146 at McKinney Road. On October 22, 1976, the road was extended east 1.1 miles (1.8 km) to SH 146 near Ferry Road. Loop 201 was cancelled on March 28, 1996, and became a portion of SH 146 when it was rerouted.

== Loop 203 ==
=== Loop 203 (1948) ===
State Highway Loop 203
- Location: Collin County
- Existed: January 17, 1948–October 28, 1961

The first use of the Loop 203 designation was in Collin County as a loop off then-proposed US 75 in McKinney. On May 25, 1954, the route was unchanged, but was signed as US 75 Business after US 75 was rerouted. Loop 203 was cancelled on October 28, 1961, and removed from the highway system.

=== Loop 203 (1977) ===
State Highway Loop 203
- Location: Haskell County
- Existed: October 21, 1977–June 21, 1990

The next use of the Loop 203 designation was in Haskell County as a loop off US 277 in Weinert. The route was signed as US 277 Business rather than Loop 203. Loop 203 was cancelled on June 21, 1990, and transferred to Bus. US 277.

== Loop 204 ==
State Highway Loop 204
- Location: Collingsworth County
- Existed: February 27, 1948–present

Loop 204 is located in Wellington.

Loop 204 was designated on February 27, 1948, on the current route.

== Loop 205 ==
State Highway Loop 205
- Location: Fannin County
- Existed: June 1, 1948–present

Loop 205 is located in Bonham.

Loop 205 was designated on June 1, 1948, on the current route.

== Loop 207 ==
State Highway Loop 207
- Location: Chambers County
- Existed: September 12, 1946–September 26, 2019

Loop 207 was located in Mont Belvieu.

Loop 207 was designated on September 12, 1946, along the current route. On June 30, 2011, the section from FM 565 south and southwest to SH 146 was removed from the highway system, becoming a private road for a future refinery. The remainder of Loop 207 was cancelled on September 26, 2019 and turned over to the city of Mont Belvieu.

== Loop 208 ==
State Highway Loop 208
- Location: Leon County
- Existed: July 20, 1948–present

Loop 208 is located in Marquez.

Loop 208 was designated on July 20, 1948, on the current route.

== Loop 210 ==
State Highway Loop 210
- Location: Angelina County
- Existed: June 1, 1948–present

Loop 210 is located in Diboll.

Loop 210 was designated on June 1, 1948, on the current route.

== Loop 211 ==
State Highway Loop 211
- Location: Deaf Smith County
- Existed: December 10, 1946–present

Loop 211 is located in Hereford.

Loop 211 was designated on December 10, 1946, on the current route.

== Loop 212 ==
State Highway Loop 212
- Location: Travis County
- Existed: August 26, 1948–present

Loop 212 is located in Manor. Its western terminus is at US 290 in the western part of the city. It proceeds east along Murray Avenue before turning south to follow Lexington Street through the center of Manor. Loop 212 turns east at Parsons Street at an intersection with FM 973, and the two routes run concurrently. After leaving the city limits, the roadway is known Old Highway 20. The routes then turn north to another intersection with US 290, where the Loop 212 designation terminates. The road continues to the north as FM 973.

Loop 212 was designated on August 26, 1948, as a loop route off US 290 into Manor. A portion of the highway is routed over a former alignment of the original SH 20, which was redesignated US 290 in 1951.

== Loop 213 ==
State Highway Loop 213
- Location: Bexar County
- Existed: August 26, 1948–August 4, 1966

Loop 213 was located in San Antonio.

Loop 213 was designated on August 26, 1948, from US 90, 0.5 miles (0.80 km) east of San Antonio, to a point 0.5 miles (0.80 km) north. On August 4, 1966, Loop 213 was cancelled and removed from the highway system when US 90 was rerouted.

== Loop 214 ==
State Highway Loop 214
- Location: Martin County
- Existed: August 28, 1991–March 30, 1995

Loop 214 was located in Stanton.

Loop 214 was designated on August 28, 1991, as a replacement of a section of US 80 when it was decommissioned in favor of I-20. On March 30, 1995, Loop 214 was cancelled by district request and transferred to Business I-20-F.

== Loop 216 ==
State Highway Loop 216
- Location: Hunt County
- Existed: August 28, 1958–June 21, 1990

Loop 216 was located in Commerce.

Loop 216 was designated on August 26, 1958, as a loop off SH 24 (now SH 224) in Commerce. On June 21, 1990, Loop 216 was cancelled and transferred to Bus. SH 24 (now Bus. SH 224).

== Loop 217 ==
State Highway Loop 217
- Location: Tarrant County
- Existed: August 1, 1947–April 18, 1963

Loop 217 was located in Fort Worth.

Loop 217 was designated on August 1, 1947, from US 377/SH 183 west of Fort Worth southeast to US 81 near the south city limits. On September 27, 1951, the road was extended northeast and north to SH 183 and/or SH 121 northeast of Fort Worth. Loop 217 was cancelled on April 18, 1963: the section from SH 183 and/or SH 121 southwest to Horne Road became I-820 and the section from Horne Road northwest to US 377 was transferred to Loop 820 (now SH 183).

== Loop 218 ==
State Highway Loop 218
- Location: Dawson County
- Existed: December 12, 1946–June 21, 1990

Loop 218 was located in Lamesa. It is now Bus. US 87.

== Loop 219 ==
State Highway Loop 219
- Location: Kaufman County
- Existed: June 1, 1948–December 19, 1991

Loop 219 was located in Crandall.

Loop 219 was designated on June 1, 1948, from US 175 north of Crandall south to then-US 175, then east to new US 175. On December 19, 1991, Loop 219 was cancelled on December 19, 1991, and transferred to Bus. US 175.

== Loop 220 ==
State Highway Loop 220
- Location: Fayette County
- Existed: April 27, 1995–present

Loop 220 is located in Plum.

Loop 220 was designated on April 27, 1995, as a loop off SH 71 in Plum. This was formerly a section of SH 71 before it was rerouted south around the town.

=== Loop 220 (1949) ===
State Highway Loop 220
- Location: Fannin County
- Existed: February 25, 1949–June 21, 1990

The original Loop 220 was designated as a loop off US 69 in Trenton as a replacement of US 69 when it was rerouted. Loop 220 was cancelled on June 21, 1990, and transferred to Bus. US 69.

== Loop 221 ==
State Highway Loop 221
- Location: Fannin County
- Existed: February 25, 1949–October 31, 2002

Loop 221 was located in Leonard.

Loop 221 was designated on February 25, 1949, from US 69 near the north city limits of Leonard to SH 78 in Leonard. On October 31, 2002, Loop 221 was cancelled by district request and redesignated as FM 896.

== Loop 222 ==
State Highway Loop 222
- Location: Fayette County
- Existed: February 23, 1949–present

Loop 222 is located in Schulenburg.

Loop 222 was designated on February 23, 1949, on the current route.

== Loop 223 ==
State Highway Loop 223
- Location: McDade
- Length: 1.161 mi (1.868 km)
- Existed: March 29, 1949–present

Loop 223 is a 1.161 miles (1.868 km) state highway loop in McDade, that forms a northern loop off of U.S. Route 290 (US 290) and connects US 290 and Farm to Market Road 2336 with US 290.

Loop 223 was designated on March 29, 1949, on the current route.

== Loop 224 ==
State Highway Loop 224
- Location: Nacogdoches County
- Length: 11.335 mi (18.242 km)
- Existed: March 1, 1960–present

Loop 224 is located in Nacogdoches.

Loop 224 was designated on March 1, 1960, from SH 21 west of Nacogdoches south, east, and north to SH 7 east of Nacogdoches. On July 31, 1964, the road was extended north from SH 21 to US 59 and US 259. On May 3, 1967, the road was extended north and west from SH 7 to another junction with Loop 224, completing the loop.

Junction list

The entire route is in Nacogdoches, Nacogdoches County.

mi	km	Exit	Destinations	Notes
0.000– 1.040	0.000– 1.674		US 59 north / Westward Drive (Northwest Stallings Drive)	Interchange; eastern end of concurrency with US 59
1.452	2.337		Bus. US 59 (North Street)	
2.763	4.447		FM 1275 south (North University Drive)	Northern terminus of FM 1275
3.754	6.041		FM 2609 (Appleby Sand Road)	
4.861	7.823		FM 1878 (East Starr Avenue)	
7.007	11.277		SH 7 east / Bus. SH 7-N west	Western end of SH 7 concurrency; eastern terminus of Bus. SH 7
7.598– 7.873	12.228– 12.670		SH 21 east / Bus. SH 21-P west (East Main Street)	Interchange; western end of SH 21 concurrency; eastern terminus of Bus. SH 21
8.953	14.408		FM 2259 (Woden Road)	
10.564	17.001		FM 1275 south (South Rayburn Drive)	Western end of FM 1275 concurrency
10.740	17.284		FM 1275 north (South University Drive)	Eastern end of FM 1275 concurrency
11.636	18.726		FM 2863 south (New Press Road)	Northern terminus of FM 2863
12.129– 12.539	19.520– 20.180	59S	US 59 south / Bus. US 59 north (South Street)	Interchange; western end of US 59 concurrency; southern terminus of Bus. US 59; signed as exit 59S westbound only
12.942	20.828		US 59 south	Planned freeway interchange; westbound access only
12.942– 13.315	20.828– 21.428		SH 7 west / Bus. SH 7-N east (South Fredonia Street)	Interchange; eastern end of SH 7 concurrency; western terminus of Bus. SH 7
13.668– 14.173	21.997– 22.809		FM 225 (Durst Street)	Interchange
14.876– 15.340	23.941– 24.687		SH 21 west / Bus. SH 21-P east (Douglass Road)	Interchange; eastern end of SH 21 concurrency; western terminus of Bus. SH 21
16.379	26.359		FM 2609 east	Eastbound access only; western terminus of FM 2609
17.628– 18.095	28.370– 29.121		FM 1638 (Old Tyler Road)	Interchange
17.628– 18.095	28.370– 29.121		FM 3314 west (Lone Star Road)	Accessible from westbound entrance ramp only; eastern terminus of FM 3314
1.000 mi = 1.609 km; 1.000 km = 0.621 mi: Concurrency terminus; Incomplete access; Unopened

== Loop 225 ==
State Highway Loop 225
- Location: Dimmit County
- Existed: November 18, 1947–present

Loop 225 is located in Carrizo Springs.

Loop 225 was designated on November 18, 1947, on the current route.

== Loop 227 ==
State Highway Loop 227
- Location: Liberty County
- Existed: May 4, 1984–present

Loop 227 is located in Liberty.

Loop 227 was designated on May 4, 1984, from SH 146 at Hardin Drive and Main Street south and southwest to US 90. The route was formerly a portion of SH 146.

=== Loop 227 (1947) ===
State Highway Loop 227
- Location: Kleberg County
- Existed: November 18, 1947–January 19, 1966

The original Loop 227 was designated on November 18, 1947, as a loop off US 77 in Kingsville as a replacement of US 77 when it was rerouted. On January 19, 1966, Loop 227 was cancelled and returned to the city of Kingsville when US 77 was rerouted and the old route became Loop 428 (now Bus. US 77). The road is now 6th Street.

== Loop 229 ==
State Highway Loop 229
- Location: Coke County
- Existed: February 27, 1948–present

Loop 229 is located in Robert Lee. It runs from SH 208 to FM 1904.

Loop 229 was designated on February 27, 1948, from SH 208 in Robert Lee via Austin Street and 7th Street to SH 208. On December 16, 1960, the section on Austin Street was given to the city, and the road was extended northwest on the old location of FM 387 to the new location, which became FM 1904 on January 12, 1969, when FM 387 was rerouted; FM 387 became part of SH 158 on May 6, 1969, and was relocated elsewhere in the state on April 25, 1978.

== Loop 230 ==
State Highway Loop 230
- Location: Bastrop County
- Existed: August 15, 1984–present

Loop 230 is located in Smithville.

Loop 230 was designated on August 15, 1984, on the current route. It runs from SH 71 through Smithville and back to SH 71.

=== Loop 230 (1946) ===
State Highway Loop 230
- Location: Lubbock County
- Existed: December 10, 1946–October 30, 1957

The original Loop 230 was designated on December 10, 1946, from US 62/US 82 east of Lubbock along College Avenue (this was corrected to E. Broadway in 1950) to US 87 in Lubbock. Loop 230 was cancelled on October 30, 1957, and removed from the highway system due to changes with Lubbock's highway system.

== Loop 231 ==
=== Loop 231 (1947) ===
State Highway Loop 231
- Location: Lubbock County
- Existed: November 18, 1947–October 30, 1957

The first use of the Loop 231 designation was in Lubbock County, from US 87 south of Lubbock to then-US 84 in southern Lubbock, then north along US 84 via Lubbock to Fourth Street, then north to US 87. Loop 231 was cancelled on October 30, 1957, and removed from the highway system due to changes with Lubbock's highway system.

=== Loop 231 (1958) ===
State Highway Loop 231
- Location: Andrews County
- Existed: November 20, 1958–August 27, 1959

The next use of the Loop 231 designation was in Andrews County as a loop off SH 51 in Andrews. The route was never built, and was cancelled nine months later.

== Loop 232 ==
State Highway Loop 232
- Location: McLennan County
- Existed: October 31, 1958–March 9, 1964

Loop 232 was located in Waco.

Loop 232 was designated on October 31, 1958, from US 84/FM 2418 east of Bellmead southeast to FM 2491. On September 27, 1960, the road was extended 1.4 miles (2.3 km) south to SH 6. Loop 232 was cancelled on March 9, 1964, and transferred to Loop 340.

== Loop 235 ==
State Highway Loop 235
- Location: Smith County
- Existed: August 11, 1950–present

Loop 235 is located in Tyler.

Loop 235 was designated on August 11, 1950, on the current route.

== Loop 236 ==
State Highway Loop 236
- Location: Cass County
- Existed: September 28, 1950–present

Loop 236 is located in Queen City.

Loop 236 was designated on September 28, 1950, on the current route. It was the old route of US 59, and was to be marked as Bus. US 59, but that designation never took effect.

== Loop 237 ==
=== Loop 237 (1950) ===
State Highway Loop 237
- Location: Bowie County
- Existed: September 28, 1950–September 23, 1953

The first use of the Loop 237 designation was in Bowie County, from US 82 along Robinson Road to US 67 in Texarkana. Loop 237 was cancelled on September 23, 1953, and eliminated from the highway system.

=== Loop 237 (1958) ===
State Highway Loop 237
- Location: Nolan County
- Existed: April 15, 1959–June 21, 1990

The next use of the Loop 237 designation was in Nolan County as a redesignation of Spur 237 in Roscoe. Loop 237 was cancelled on June 21, 1990, and transferred to Business I-20-L.

== Loop 238 ==
State Highway Loop 238
- Location: Camp County
- Existed: November 20, 1950–March 31, 2016

Loop 238 was located in Pittsburg.

Loop 238 was designated on November 20, 1950, as a loop off US 271 in Pittsburg. On March 31, 2016, Loop 238 was redesignated as Bus. US 271.

== Loop 243 ==
State Highway Loop 243
- Location: Taylor County
- Existed: July 28, 1959–June 21, 1990

Loop 243 was located in Abilene.

Loop 243 was designated on July 28, 1959, as a loop off US 83 in Abilene. On June 21, 1990, Loop 243 was cancelled and transferred to Bus. US 83.

== Loop 249 ==
=== Loop 249 (1952) ===
State Highway Loop 249
- Location: Cameron County
- Length: 3.3 mi (5.3 km)
- Existed: March 24, 1952–March 2, 1967

The first use of the Loop 249 designation was in Cameron County as a loop off US 77 in Harlingen. On March 2, 1967, Loop 249 was cancelled and removed from the highway system due to completion of US 83/Spur 206.

=== Loop 249 (1980) ===
State Highway Loop 249
- Location: Wise County
- Existed: June 16, 1980–June 21, 1990

The second use of the Loop 249 designation was in Alvord. It is now Bus. US 81.

== Loop 250 ==
State Highway Loop 250
- Location: Midland County
- Existed: August 31, 1977–present

Loop 250 is located in Midland. Serving as the city's northern bypass, it runs from I-20 west of town to I-20 east of town.

Loop 250 was designated on August 31, 1977, on the current route. On July 24, 1984, Loop 250 replaced all of FM 1369 and a section of FM 868 from Loop 250 to SH 349; these sections had been co-located with Loop 250 since 1978.

=== Loop 250 (1952) ===
State Highway Loop 250
- Location: Travis County
- Existed: March 31, 1952–August 17, 1954

The original Loop 250 was designated on March 31, 1952, from US 81 (now I-35) in north Austin southeast to US 183 near the Montopolis Bridge southeast of Austin. Loop 250 was cancelled on August 17, 1954, and transferred to US 183.

== Loop 251 ==
=== Loop 251 (1951) ===
State Highway Loop 251
- Location: Jefferson County
- Existed: September 19, 1951–May 24, 1963

The first use of the Loop 251 designation was in Jefferson County, from US 90 at 11th Street in Beaumont southeast to US 69 near southern Beaumont. Loop 251 was cancelled on May 24, 1963, and replaced by a rerouted US 69, US 96 and US 287, but this did not take effect until 90 days later.

=== Loop 251 (1965) ===
State Highway Loop 251
- Location: Lubbock County
- Existed: January 26, 1965–June 21, 1990

The next use of the Loop 251 designation was in Lubbock County as a loop off US 84 in Slaton. The route was signed as US 84 Business rather than Loop 251. On June 21, 1990, Loop 251 was cancelled and transferred to Bus. US 84.

== Loop 252 ==
State Highway Loop 252
- Location: Stephens County
- Existed: March 28, 1952–present

Loop 252 is located in Caddo.

Loop 252 was designated on March 28, 1952, on the current route.

== Loop 254 ==
State Highway Loop 254
- Location: Eastland County
- Length: 5.948 mi (9.572 km)
- Existed: August 28, 1991–present

Loop 254 is located in Ranger.

Loop 254 was designated on August 28, 1991, on the current route as part of the cancellation of US 80 west of Dallas.

Loop 254 begins at I-20 / FM 2461 in southwestern Ranger. The highway travels through less developed areas of town before passing by Ranger College and Ranger Airfield. Loop 254 intersects Farm to Market Road 101 near the town square, then turns to a more eastward direction near Clay Street. The highway travels past Vietnam Veterans Memorial Park and Ranger High School before ending at a modified trumpet interchange with I-20.

Junction list

The entire route is in Eastland County.

Location	mi	km	Destinations	Notes
Ranger	0.0	0.0	I-20 / FM 2461 south – Eastland, Weatherford	I-20 exit 349
Ranger	2.4	3.9	FM 101 west – Morton Valley, Caddo	
	5.9	9.5	I-20 – Weatherford, Eastland	I-20 exit 354
1.000 mi = 1.609 km; 1.000 km = 0.621 mi

=== Loop 254 (1952) ===
State Highway Loop 254
- Location: Starr County
- Existed: June 10, 1952–May 1, 1989

The original Loop 254 was designated on June 10, 1952, as a loop off US 83 in Rio Grande City. On May 1, 1989, Loop 254 was cancelled by district request and transferred to and redesignated as US 83.

== Loop 255 ==
State Highway Loop 255
- Location: Camp County
- Existed: December 17, 2015–present

Loop 255 is located in Camp County. It is planned to run from FM 1520 to US 271, but currently is only signed from CR 2118 to US271.

Loop 255 was designated on December 17, 2015, on the current route as a replacement of FM 3535.

=== Loop 255 (1959) ===
State Highway Loop 255
- Location: Freestone County
- Existed: October 21, 1959–June 21, 1990

Loop 255 was located in Teague.

Loop 255 was designated on October 21, 1959, as a loop off US 84 in Teague as a replacement of US 84 when it was rerouted. On June 21, 1990, Loop 255 was cancelled and transferred to Bus. US 84.

== Loop 256 ==
State Highway Loop 256
- Location: Anderson County
- Existed: October 31, 1958–present

Loop 256 is a loop highway around Palestine. Loop 256 is a five-lane highway around the city. The southeast side of the loop, from its intersections with US 287/SH 19 to US 79/US 84, is the only part that is heavily commercially developed.

The road first appears on maps in 1964 as a six-mile (10 km) road on Palestine's east side, connecting US 287 with SH 155. During the 1970s, 1980s, and the early 1990s the loop was expanded to finally form a complete circle around the core of the city.

Loop 256 was designated on October 31, 1958, from SH 155 northeast of Palestine southward to US 287. On September 27, 1960, Loop 256 was extended northwest to US 79. On July 31, 1969, Loop 256 was extended back to SH 155, making it a full loop.

== Loop 257 ==
State Highway Loop 257
- Location: Lampasas County
- Existed: July 22, 1952–present

Loop 257 is located in Lampasas.

Loop 257 was designated on July 22, 1952, on the current route.

== Loop 260 ==
State Highway Loop 260
- Location: Dallas County
- Existed: August 20, 1952–June 25, 1991

Loop 260 was located in Dallas.

Loop 260 was designated on August 20, 1952, from US 80 in western Oak Cliff Addition to US 80 at or near the Dallas County Courthouse as a replacement of what was left of SH 1. The route was signed as US 80 Business rather than Loop 260. Loop 260 was cancelled on June 25, 1991, by district request and returned to the city of Dallas.

== Loop 262 ==
State Highway Loop 262
- Location: Freestone County
- Existed: May 27, 1952–present

Loop 262 is located in Streetman.

Loop 262 was designated on May 27, 1952, on the current route.

== Loop 264 ==
=== Loop 264 (1952) ===
State Highway Loop 264
- Location: Karnes County
- Existed: September 25, 1952–December 4, 1952

The first use of the Loop 264 designation was in Karnes County as a loop off US 181 in Karnes City. This was formerly a portion of US 181 before it was rerouted; the route was signed as US 181 Business rather than Loop 264. Three months later Loop 264 was cancelled and replaced by extensions of SH 80 and FM 1144, although it remained signed as US 181 Business.

=== Loop 264 (1959) ===
State Highway Loop 264
- Location: Hunt County
- Existed: December 19, 1959–January 28, 1970

The next use of the Loop 264 designation was in Hunt County as a loop off SH 34 in Quinlan as a replacement of a portion of FM 35. On January 28, 1970, the section from SH 34 in Quinlan to a point 0.544 miles (0.875 km) west was transferred to SH 276 and the route was changed to Spur 264.

== Loop 265 ==
State Highway Loop 265
- Location: Falls County
- Existed: March 28, 1952–present

Loop 265 is located in Rosebud.

Loop 265 was designated on March 28, 1952, on the current route.

== Loop 266 ==
State Highway Loop 266
- Location: Angelina County
- Existed: November 18, 1952–April 30, 2020

Loop 266 was located in Lufkin.

Loop 266 was designated on November 18, 1952, from US 59 north of Lufkin to US 59 south of Lufkin along the old route of US 59. The road was signed as Bus. US 59 until June 21, 1990, when US 59 was rerouted and Bus. US 59 was designated on the old route of US 59. Loop 266 was cancelled on April 30, 2020, and given to the city of Lufkin. The road is now known as First Street.

== Loop 267 ==
State Highway Loop 267
- Location: Wichita County
- Existed: November 19, 1952–present

Loop 267 is located in Wichita County.

Loop 267 was designated on November 19, 1952 as a loop off US 277/US 281 in Burkburnett. The route was signed as US 277/US 281 Business rather than Loop 267. Two months later the northern leg was transferred to SH 240. On April 24, 1964, the road was extended on a new route over SH 240 (SH 240 was rerouted on top of Loop 165) and old US 277/US 281 to US 277/US 281; this became effective when traffic was routed on new US 277, US 281 and US 287. Loop 267 was to be cancelled on May 30, 2002 by district request; one portion would have been replaced by a rerouted SH 240 and the rest removed, but this never happened, and the minute order was repealed on June 20, 2025.

== Loop 268 ==
State Highway Loop 268
- Location: Midland County
- Existed: June 30, 2011–present

Loop 268 is located in Midland.

Loop 268 was designated on June 30, 2011, on the current route as a redesignation of Spur 268.

== Loop 271 ==
State Highway Loop 271
- Location: Gray County
- Existed: July 28, 1953–present

Loop 271 is located in Alanreed.

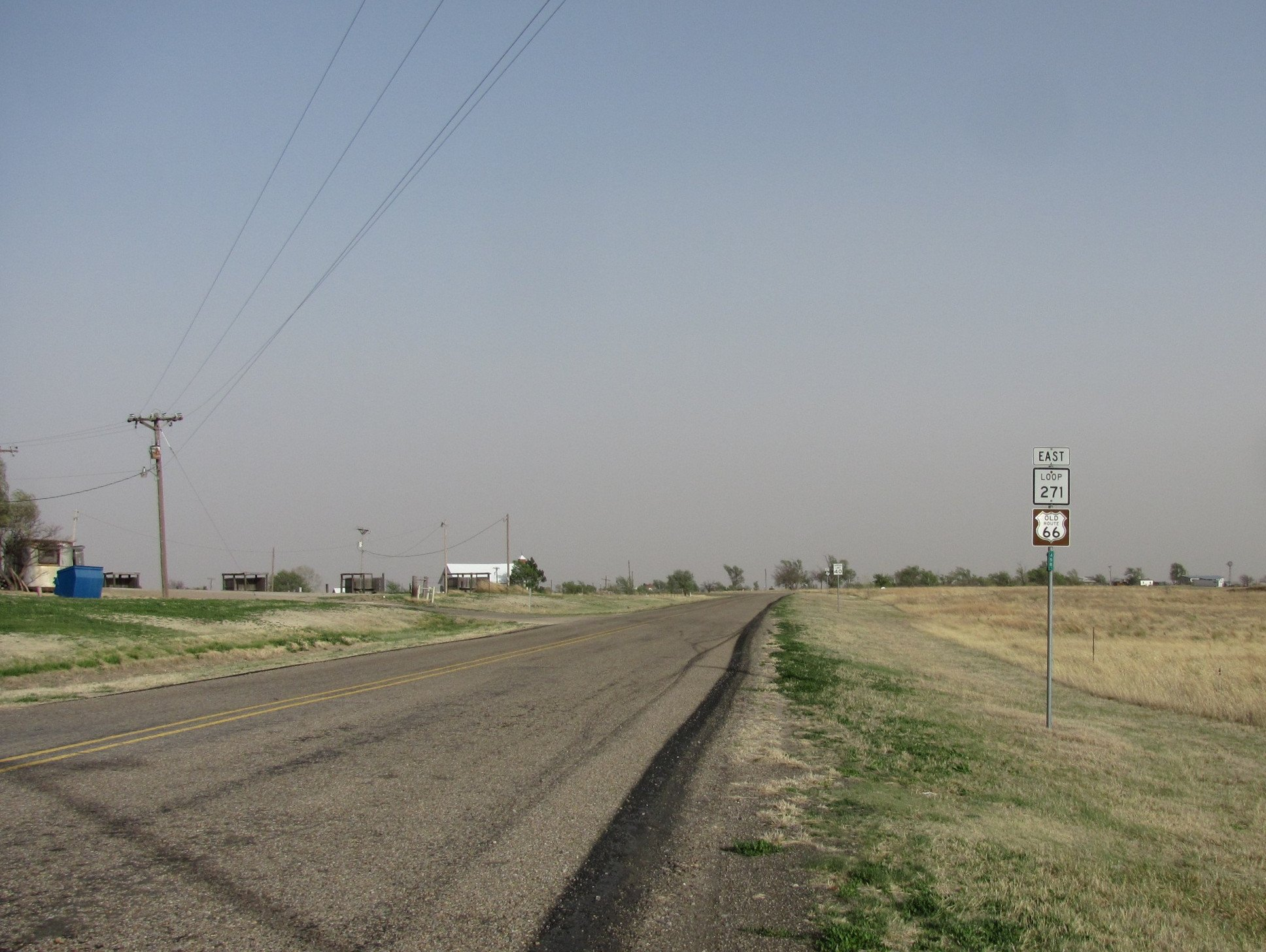
Eastbound in Alanreed, April 2011

Loop 271 begins at the end of the ramp for eastbound I-40 at exit 135; traffic may also turn on to the eastbound frontage road. The route travels along 3rd Avenue, and intersects FM 291 in the center of Alanreed. The highways share a brief concurrency before FM 291 turns to the south. Loop 271 ends at I-40, where eastbound traffic can either enter the freeway eastbound or default onto the eastbound frontage road.

Loop 271 was designated on July 28, 1953. It is an older alignment of US 66, which was rerouted north of the town that year. The route is signed with Historic US 66 route markers.

== Loop 274 ==
State Highway Loop 274
- Location: Brazoria County
- Existed: September 30, 1999–present

Loop 274 is located in Angleton. Its southern terminus is at an interchange with Bus. SH 288 and runs to the west of that route, providing an overpass of the Union Pacific Railroad crossing near the junction. It intersects SH 35 in the city's central business district before ending at another intersection with Bus. SH 288.

The current Loop 274 was designated on September 30, 1999, along the current route.

=== Loop 274 (1958) ===
State Highway Loop 252
- Location: Hale County
- Existed: May 22, 1958–January 31, 1967

A previous route numbered Loop 274 was designated in Hale County on May 22, 1958, as a loop off US 87 (now I-27) around the west side of Plainview. Loop 274 was cancelled on January 31, 1967, and replaced by US 87 when that route was rerouted; the original route of US 87 became Loop 445, which is now Business I-27.

== Loop 275 ==
State Highway Loop 275
- Location: Travis County
- Existed: September 26, 1939–present

Loop 275 is located in Austin.

Although Loop 275 was not officially designated until March 24, 1954, it was created on September 26, 1939, when US 81 (now I-35) was rerouted east onto its current alignment. The route was also signed as US 81 Business until 1975. On July 11, 1986, and February 24, 2000, at district request, the sections from US 183 to Williamson Creek were removed and returned to the city of Austin, creating the current gap in the route.

== Loop 279 ==
State Highway Loop 279
- Location: Potter County
- Existed: May 25, 1954–present

Loop 279, formerly Business U.S. Highway 66, is a state highway in Amarillo, Texas, United States.

== Loop 281 ==
State Highway Loop 281
- Location: Gregg and Harrison counties
- Existed: March 22, 1960–present

State Highway Loop 281 or Loop 281 is a Texas state highway loop that forms a partial beltway around the city of Longview.

=== Loop 281 (1954) ===
State Highway Loop 281
- Location: Wichita County
- Existed: December 3, 1954–November 7, 1958

A previous route numbered Loop 281 was designated in Wichita County on December 3, 1954, from then-US 82/US 287 southeast of Wichita Falls northwest alongside the Missouri–Kansas–Texas Railroad and Fort Worth and Denver Railway rail lines to then-US 281 on the city's north side. Loop 281 was cancelled on November 7, 1958, and renumbered as Loop 165 (now SH 240) to avoid confusion with US 281.

== Loop 282 ==
State Highway Loop 282
- Location: Poteet
- Length: 1.658 mi (2.668 km)
- Existed: September 27, 1954–present

Loop 282 is located in Poteet.

Loop 282 was designated on September 27, 1954, as a loop off SH 346 (now SH 16) in Poteet. The route, formerly a portion of SH 346, was redesignated as SH 346 Business but numbered as Loop 282.

== Loop 283 ==
State Highway Loop 283
- Location: Washington County
- Existed: September 29, 1954–June 21, 1990

Loop 283 was located in Brenham.

Loop 283 was designated on September 29, 1954, from SH 36 north of Brenham southwest to US 290 west of Brenham, then southeast to SH 36 south of Brenham, then northeast to US 290 southeast of Brenham, forming a partial loop. On January 18, 1960, the section from US 290 west of Brenham to US 290 southeast of Brenham was transferred to US 290 (the former route of US 290 became Loop 318). On June 4, 1964, the remainder of the route was transferred to SH 36 and Loop 283 was reassigned to a former routing of SH 36 from SH 36 to US 290 and signed as SH 36 Business rather than Loop 283. Loop 283 was cancelled on June 21, 1990, and transferred to Bus. SH 36.

== Loop 284 ==
State Highway Loop 284
- Location: Morris County
- Existed: May 31, 1965–present

Loop 284 is located in Omaha.

Loop 284 was designated on May 31, 1965, on the current route.

=== Loop 284 (1958) ===
State Highway Loop 284
- Location: Shelby County
- Existed: August 28, 1958–February 5, 1960

The original Loop 284 was designated on August 28, 1958, as a loop off SH 87 around the north side of Center. Loop 284 was cancelled on February 5, 1960, and removed from the highway system after the city of Center deferred construction.

== Loop 285 ==
State Highway Loop 285
- Location: Hardeman County
- Existed: December 17, 1970–present

Loop 285 is located in Quanah.

Loop 285 was designated on December 17, 1970, on the current route, replacing the old route of US 287.

=== Loop 285 (1955) ===
State Highway Loop 285
- Location: Hardeman County
- Existed: September 30, 1955–December 17, 1970

The original Loop 285 was designated on September 30, 1955, from US 287 in western Quanah north to Spur 133. This was formerly a portion of US 287 before it was rerouted. Loop 285 was cancelled on December 17, 1970, and became a portion of FM 2568.

== Loop 286 ==
State Highway Loop 286
- Location: Lamar County
- Existed: June 30, 1955–present

Loop 286 is located that encircles Paris.

Loop 286 was designated on June 30, 1955, from FM 79, 1.3 miles (2.1 km) northwest of Paris, east 3.3 miles (5.3 km) to FM 195, 1.2 miles (1.9 km) northeast of Paris. On March 29, 1957, the road was extended south, west and north back to FM 79 near the origin, completing the loop around Paris. On May 28, 1969, the northern half of Loop 286 was transferred to US 82 and US 271.

Junction list

The entire route is in Paris, Lamar County. All exits are unnumbered.

mi	km	Exit	Destinations	Notes
			US 82 – Bonham	Beginning of US 82 concurrency
			FM 79	
			US 271 north – Hugo	Beginning of US 271 concurrency
			Stillhouse Road	Access to Paris Regional Medical Center
			FM 195	
			US 82 east – Clarksville; Pine Mill Road	End of US 82 concurrency; separate clockwise exit and counterclockwise entrance for Pine Mill Road
			Bus. US 271	Access to northbound Loop 286 via loop ramp at US 271 South exit
			US 271 south – Mount Pleasant	End of US 271 concurrency
		End of divided highway		
			FM 1507	
		Beginning of divided highway		
			FM 1497	At-grade intersection
			SH 19 / SH 24 – Cooper, Sulphur Springs	
		End of divided highway		
			FM 137	Right-in/right-out
		Beginning of divided highway		
1.000 mi = 1.609 km; 1.000 km = 0.621 mi: Concurrency terminus

== Loop 287 ==
State Highway Loop 287
- Location: Angelina County
- Existed: June 30, 1955–present

Loop 287 is located that encircles Lufkin.

Loop 287 was designated on June 30, 1955, from SH 103 northwest of Lufkin south and east around the city's west and south sides to US 69 southeast of Lufkin. On March 1, 1966, a section from SH 103 to US 69 and another section from US 69 to US 59 were added, completing the loop around Lufkin.

== Loop 288 ==
State Highway Loop 288
- Location: Denton County
- Length: 10.113 mi (16.275 km)
- Existed: September 21, 1955–present

Loop 288 is a state highway within the city limits of Denton. On the north side of town, the loop runs next to the C. H. Collins Athletic Complex. Despite its name, Loop 288 does not make a complete circuit, running instead around the north, east and southeast sides of the city. It begins at an interchange with I-35 on the northwest corner of Denton and loops around the north, east and southeast sides of the city before ending at another intersection with I-35E adjacent to Denton's shopping mall. The total length is 10.1 miles (16.3 km). In recent years, several large retail stores have been built on or near the southeast portion of the loop, and this, coupled with ongoing road expansion projects, has resulted in extreme traffic congestion. Loop 288 is signed as a truck route for traffic traveling east on US 380 towards McKinney.

Loop 288 was designated on September 21, 1955, from US 77 north to US 380 (then SH 24). On June 9, 1966, Loop 288 was extended westward to I-35W and northward and westward to I-35. On October 21, 1977, the section from I-35E to I-35W was cancelled. On May 29, 1991, by district request, a 4.3 mile section from Loop 288 near Spencer Road to FM 2181 was added; the old route of Loop 288 would be redesignated as a spur upon completion of relocation of Loop 288. On November 14, 2014 Loop 288 was extended on a new route and a portion of FM 2449 from IH 35 west and south to IH 35W.

== Loop 289 ==
State Highway Loop 289
- Location: Lubbock County
- Length: 26.088 mi (41.985 km)
- Existed: September 20, 1955–present

Loop 289 is a multi-lane beltway servicing Lubbock as a freeway. The highway serves as the southern end for Interstate 27 on the south side of the city.

== Loop 291 ==
State Highway Loop 291
- Location: Kimble County
- Existed: November 29, 1955–present

Loop 291 is located in Roosevelt.

Loop 291 was designated on November 29, 1955, from US 290 (now I-10) along the old location of US 290 through Roosevelt to US 290 (now I-10). On January 1, 1969, the road was extended east 2.74 miles (4.41 km) along the old route of US 290 to I-10, but this did not take effect until this section of I-10 was open to traffic.

== Loop 292 ==
State Highway Loop 292
- Location: Swisher County
- Existed: December 19, 1955–present

Loop 292 is located in Kress.

Loop 292 was designated on December 19, 1955, on the current route.

== Loop 293 ==
State Highway Loop 293
- Location: Pecos County
- Existed: March 19, 1981–present

Loop 293 is located in Bakersfield.

Loop 293 was designated on March 19, 1981, as a loop off I-10 in Bakersfield. The route was formerly part of SH 10, SH 27 and US 290.

=== Loop 293 (1955) ===
State Highway Loop 293
- Location: Travis County
- Existed: August 24, 1955–May 30, 1961

The original Loop 293 was designated from US 290 west of Austin to SH 71 and US 183. Loop 293 was cancelled on May 30, 1961, and transferred to SH 71 and US 290; the old route of SH 71 and US 290 became Loop 343.

== Loop 294 ==
State Highway Loop 294
- Location: Fort Bend County
- Existed: June 30, 1955–July 17, 1987

Loop 294 was located in Stafford.

Loop 294 was designated on June 30, 1955, as a loop off US 59 (now US 90 Alt.) in Stafford. On July 17, 1987, Loop 294 was cancelled by district request and redesignated as a section of US 90 Alt.

== Loop 295 ==
State Highway Loop 295
- Location: Nueces County
- Existed: January 19, 1956–June 21, 1990

Loop 295 was located in Robstown.

Loop 295 was designated on January 19, 1956, from then-US 77 northeast of Robstown south along old US 77 to the intersection of US 77 and FM 892 south of Robstown. The route was signed as US 77 Business rather than Loop 295. On December 18, 1962, the road was extended to new US 77 at CR 36. Loop 295 was cancelled on June 21, 1990, and transferred to Bus. US 77.

== Loop 296 ==
State Highway Loop 296
- Location: Nueces County
- Existed: January 19, 1956–June 21, 1990

Loop 296 was located in Robstown.

Loop 296 was designated on January 19, 1956, from SH 44 west of Robstown south and east 2 miles (3.2 km) along old SH 44 to US 77/SH 44 east of Robstown. The route was signed as SH 44 Business rather than Loop 296. On June 21, 1990, Loop 296 was cancelled and transferred to Bus. SH 44.
