= Alanreed, Texas =

Alanreed
- Unincorporated community Census designated place
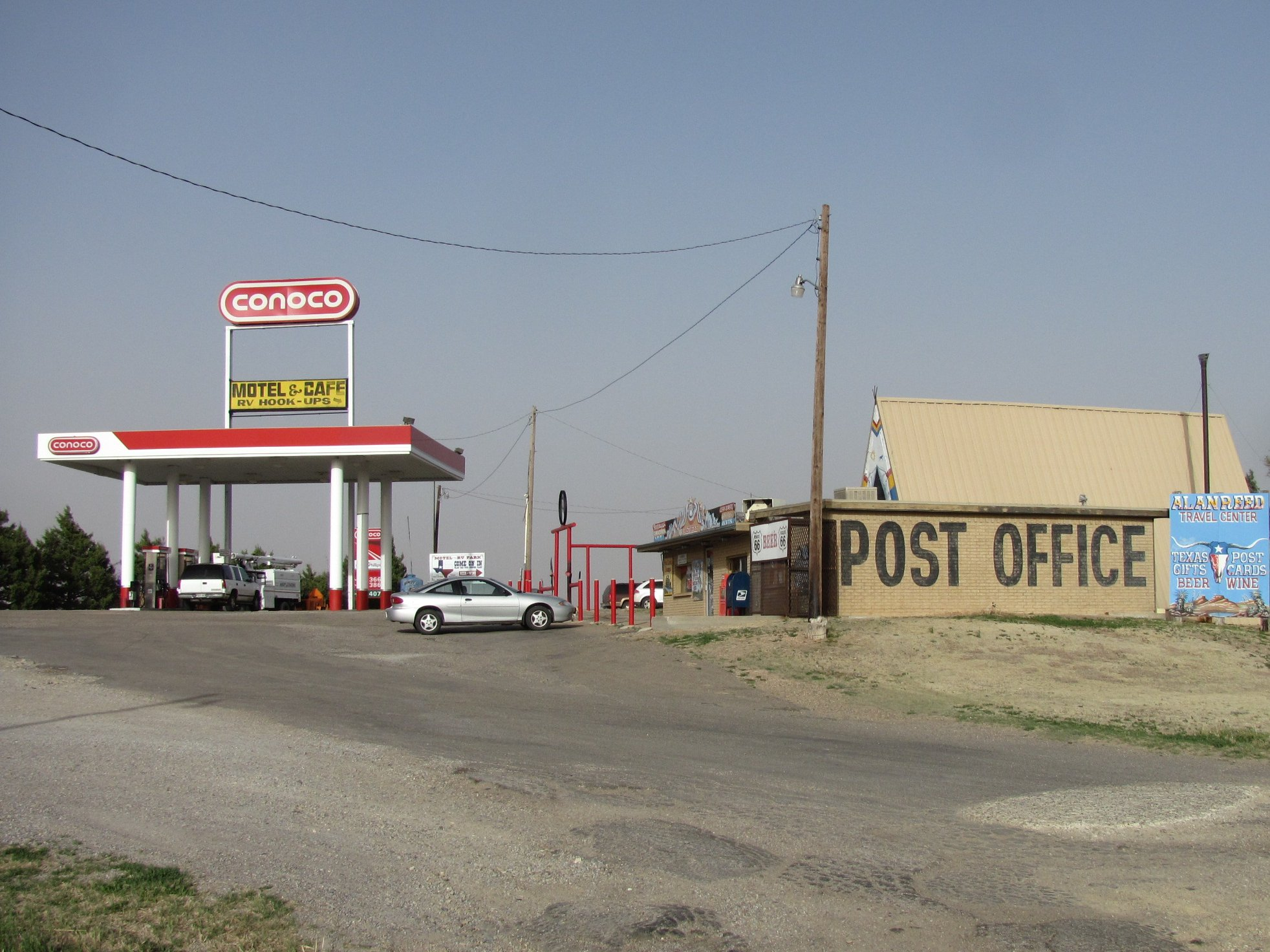
- Alanreed Post Office

- Location within Texas
- Coordinates: 35°12′42″N 100°43′57″W
- Country: United States
- State: Texas
- County: Gray
- Elevation: 3,012 ft (918 m)

Population (2020)
  - Total: 23
- Time zone: UTC-6 (Central (CST))
  - Summer (DST): UTC-5 (CDT)
- GNIS feature ID: 2805780

Alanreed is an unincorporated community and census-designated place (CDP) in Gray County, Texas, United States. It is part of the Pampa, Texas micropolitan statistical area. It was first listed as a CDP in the 2020 census with a population of 23.

== Description ==
The community was named for Alan and Reed, partners in the contracting firm that laid out the present townsite for the Choctaw, Oklahoma and Texas Railroad in 1900. An earlier name for the place was Gouge Eye, in honor of a memorable saloon brawl.

Alanreed is accessible via Interstate 40 and FM 291. Loop 271 through the community is a former alignment of the historic U.S. Route 66.

The McLean Independent School District serves area students. It was formerly served by the defunct Alanreed Independent School District.

== Demographics ==
Historical population
Census	Pop.	Note	%±
2020	23		—
U.S. Decennial Census; 1850–1900 1910; 1920 1930 1940; 1950 1960 1970; 1980 1990 2000; 2010 2020

Alanreed first appeared as a census designated place in the 2020 U.S. census.

=== 2020 Census ===
Alanreed CDP, Texas – Racial and ethnic composition Note: the US Census treats Hispanic/Latino as an ethnic category. This table excludes Latinos from the racial categories and assigns them to a separate category. Hispanics/Latinos may be of any race.
Race / Ethnicity (NH = Non-Hispanic)	Pop 2020	% 2020
White alone (NH)	23	100.00%
Black or African American alone (NH)	0	0.00%
Native American or Alaska Native alone (NH)	0	0.00%
Asian alone (NH)	0	0.00%
Native Hawaiian or Pacific Islander alone (NH)	0	0.00%
Other race alone (NH)	0	0.00%
Multiracial (NH)	0	0.00%
Hispanic or Latino (any race)	0	0.00%
Total	23	100.00%
