= Texas State Highway Loop 289 =

Road in Texas

State Highway Loop 289

Route information
- Maintained by TxDOT
- Length: 26.09 mi (41.99 km)
- Existed: 1955–present

Major junctions
- Beltway around Lubbock
- I-27 / US 87; US 84; US 62 / US 82 / SH 114; I-27 / US 87; US 84; US 62 / US 82

Location
- Country: United States
- State: Texas

Highway system
- Highways in Texas; Interstate; US; State; Former; Toll; Loops; Spurs; FM/RM; Park; Rec
← Loop 288	→ Loop 290

Loop 289 is a multi-lane beltway servicing Lubbock as a freeway. The highway serves as the southern end for Interstate 27 on the south side of the city. The highway passes about a mile south of Lubbock Preston Smith International Airport on the north side near the intersection with I-27.

== History ==
Lubbock is among the smallest U.S. cities to be encircled by a beltway or loop highway. Loop 289 is a grade-separated controlled-access freeway. Built from 1960 to 1972, it is 26 miles (42 kilometers) long. When first constructed, Loop 289 passed through entirely rural areas. Today, urban sprawl extends beyond the beltway, especially in southwestern Lubbock.

Loop 289 was designated on September 20, 1955.

I-27, completed through Lubbock in 1992, serves as the city's north–south freeway. In 2004, construction began on the Marsha Sharp Freeway, the east–west freeway. Cosigned as US 62 / US 82 at its interchange with the east leg of Loop 289, the Marsha Sharp Freeway begins northeast of downtown Lubbock and extends to a mile west of the west leg of Loop 289. From there, it is under construction and is to be extended west to the nearby suburb of Wolfforth.

== Lane configuration ==
Loop 289 is a complete loop freeway with four to six mainline lanes. The freeways have frontage roads for nearly the entire route. It is one of only three complete controlled-access loops in Texas, the other two being Interstate 610 and Beltway 8 (Sam Houston Parkway, and Sam Houston Tollway), both of which encircle Houston. At certain junctions, the freeway widens using auxiliary (exit only) lanes. At most interchanges with other highways, there are partial to full access ramps, that directly serve the mainline lanes and/or frontage roads.

== Popular culture ==
The Dixie Chicks reference Loop 289 in "Lubbock or Leave It", a track from their 2006 release Taking the Long Way. The lyric reads: 'Oh, boy, rave on down Loop 289 / That'll be the day you see me back in this fool's paradise".

== Exit list ==
Counter-clockwise (CCW) reads down and clockwise (CW) reads up. The entire route is in Lubbock, Lubbock County. All exits are unnumbered.

mi	km	Destinations	Notes
0.0	0.0	I-27 / US 87 / Avenue A – Lubbock, Amarillo, Tahoka	I-27 exit 530 (NB); I-27 exits 530 A-B (SB)
1.6	2.6	US 84 (Slaton Highway) / Martin Luther King, Jr. Boulevard – Slaton, Post	
3.3	5.3	Spur 331 (Southeast Drive)	
4.2	6.8	FM 835 (50th Street) – Buffalo Springs Lake, Ransom Canyon	
5.4	8.7	Frontage Road	CCW exit and CW entrance
6.2	10.0	19th Street	
7.3	11.7	FM 40 (4th Street)	
7.8	12.6	US 62 / US 82 / SH 114 (Idalou Road) – Lubbock, Idalou	
9.1	14.6	Frontage Road	CCW exit and CW entrance
9.6	15.4	Municipal Drive / Martin Luther King, Jr. Boulevard – Preston Smith International Airport	
10.9	17.5	Ash Avenue	CW exit via the I-27/US 87 exit
11.3	18.2	I-27 / US 87 – Lubbock, Amarillo	I-27 exits 536 (NB) and 536B (SB)
12.6	20.3	Frontage Road	CCW exit and CW entrance
13.1	21.1	FM 1264 (University Avenue) – Texas Tech University	
13.9	22.4	Frontage Road – Lubbock Lake Landmark	
14.7	23.7	US 84 – Littlefield	
14.9	24.0	Quaker Avenue / Texas Tech Parkway / Erskine Street – Texas Tech University	Access to Lubbock Heart Hospital
15.8	25.4	Slide Road	
15.8– 18.4	25.4– 29.6	FM 2255 (4th Street) – Reese Center	CCW exit via the Slide Road exit; CW exit via the Frankford Avenue exit
17.6	28.3	FM 2528 (Frankford Avenue)	
18.7	30.1	SH 114 (19th Street) – Levelland, Reese Center	CCW exit via the Frankford Avenue exit
19.1	30.7	34th Street	
20.1	32.3	US 62 / US 82 (Marsha Sharp Freeway)	
20.5	33.0	50th Street	CW exit via the US 62/82 exit
21.1	34.0	Spur 327 west – Brownfield	No CW entrance
21.1– 22.9	34.0– 36.9	Slide Road	CCW exit via the Spur 327 exit
22.4	36.0	Quaker Avenue	
24.0	38.6	Indiana Avenue	
24.9	40.1	University Avenue	
1.000 mi = 1.609 km; 1.000 km = 0.621 mi: Incomplete access
