= Interstate 27 =

Interstate in the Texas Panhandle

Interstate 27
- Marshall Formby Memorial Highway
- I-27 highlighted in red

Route information
- Maintained by TxDOT
- Length: 128.332 mi (206.530 km)
- Existed: 1969–present
- NHS: Entire route

Major junctions
- South end: US 87 in Lubbock
- US 84 in Lubbock; US 62 in Lubbock; US 82 in Lubbock; US 70 near Plainview; US 60 near Canyon
- North end: I-40 / US 60 / US 87 / US 287 in Amarillo

Location
- Country: United States
- State: Texas
- Counties: Lubbock, Hale, Swisher, Randall, Potter

Highway system
- Interstate Highway System; Main; Auxiliary; Suffixed; Business; Future; Highways in Texas; Interstate; US; State; Former; Toll; Loops; Spurs; FM/RM; Park; Rec
← SH 26	→ SH 27

Interstate 27 (I-27 (Note: Some sources use "IH-27", as "IH" is an abbreviation used by TxDOT for Interstate Highways.)) is an Interstate Highway, entirely in the US state of Texas, running north from Lubbock to I-40 in Amarillo. These two cities are the only control cities on I-27; other cities and towns served by I-27 include (from south to north) New Deal, Abernathy, Hale Center, Plainview, Kress, Tulia, Happy, and Canyon. In Amarillo, I-27 is commonly known as the Canyon Expressway (or Canyon E-Way), although it is also called Canyon Drive on its access roads. I-27 was officially designated the Marshall Formby Memorial Highway after former attorney and State Senator Marshall Formby in 2005. The entire length of I-27 replaced US Highway 87 (US 87) for traffic. An extension of I-27 north to Raton, New Mexico, and south to Laredo, Texas, was approved in 2022.

== Route description ==
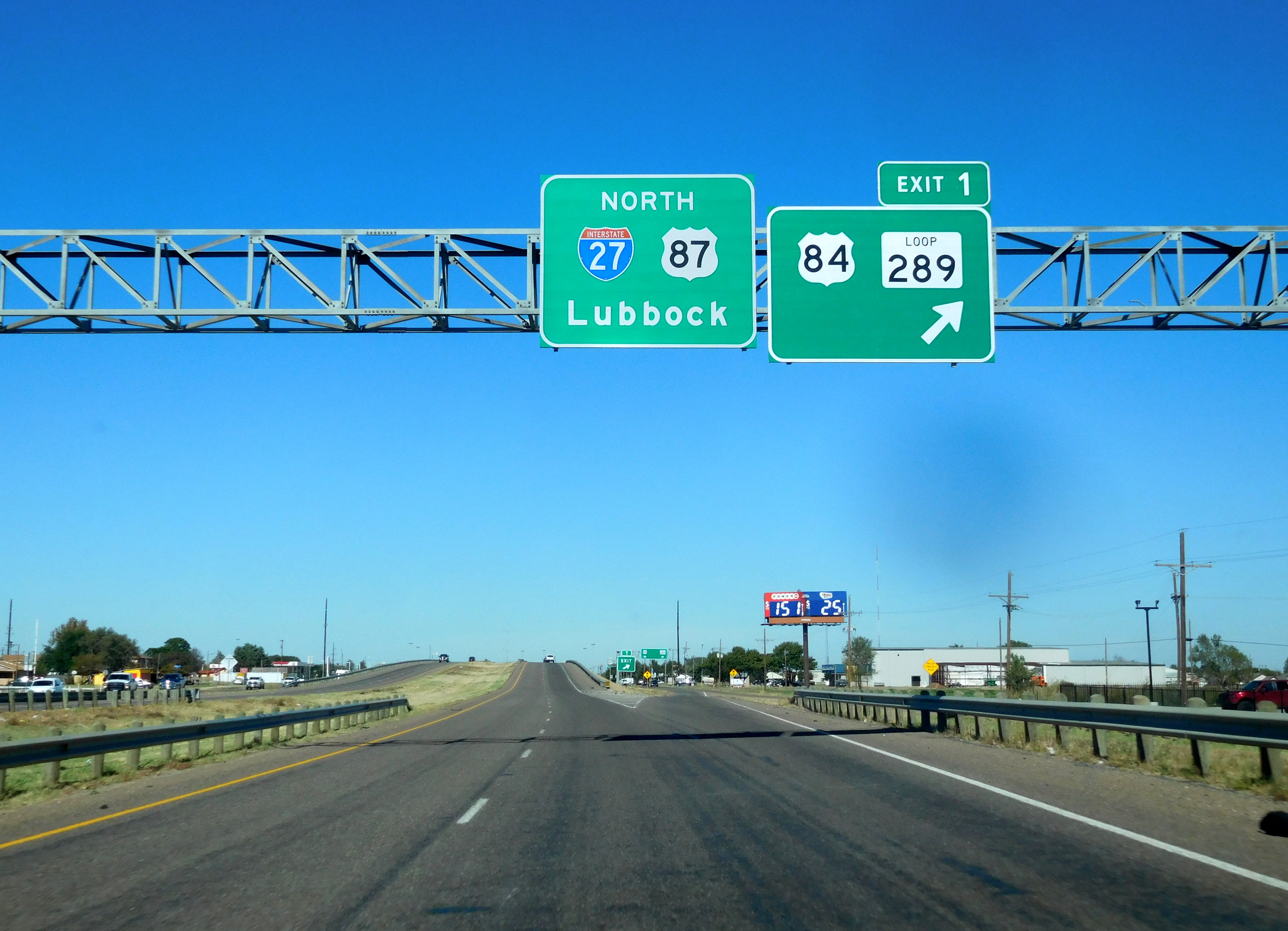
Current southern terminus in Lubbock

I-27 parallels the BNSF Railway's Plainview Subdivision, which splits from its Chicago–Southern California Transcon line at Canyon and runs south to Lubbock. A large amount of the alignment is on former US 87, but several portions through built-up areas have been bypassed, as well as two longer areas where US 87 still follows the old road.

The Interstate officially begins 0.1 miles (0.16 km) north of County Road 7500, at the beginning of access control on the four-lane US 87 freeway, at the very southern edge of Lubbock's city limits. Mile 0 is currently posted near 77th Street, about five blocks south of Loop 289. Exit numbering begins just to the south, with exit 1 at the 82nd Street interchange; the freeway becomes six lanes at its north end. With the 4.2-mile (6.8 km) extension being approved on September 3, 2024, by the Federal Highway Administration (FHWA) and the Texas Transportation Commission on September 26, 2024, both mile markers and exit numbers are planned to be eventually updated to take it into account. The Loop 289 interchange is a cloverleaf between the one-way frontage roads of each highway, and with direct ramps from I-27 south to Loop 289 west (exit 1A) and Loop 289 east to I-27 north. US 84 (Avenue Q and Slaton Highway) crosses I-27 at a three-level diamond interchange, with an extra approach from the northeast carrying Avenue A into the junction. Exit 1B connects I-27 south to US 84 and the Loop 289 frontage roads, while all traffic from US 87 north to US 84, Avenue A, or Loop 289 must use exit 1 for 82nd Street.

The six-lane cross section that began at exit 1 remains through Lubbock. Major junctions in that city include US 62/State Highway 114 (SH 11, 19th Street; exit 3) and US 82 (Marsha Sharp Freeway; exit 4). Between these two interchanges, the frontage roads temporarily end as I-27 crosses over a rail line. Spur 326 (Avenue Q) merges with I-27 at exit 6A, and exit 6B is a split diamond interchange with Loop 289. The outer lanes leave at Farm to Market Road 2641 (FM 2641, Regis Street; exit 8), reducing I-27 to two lanes in each direction as it passes Lubbock Preston Smith International Airport and leaves the city.

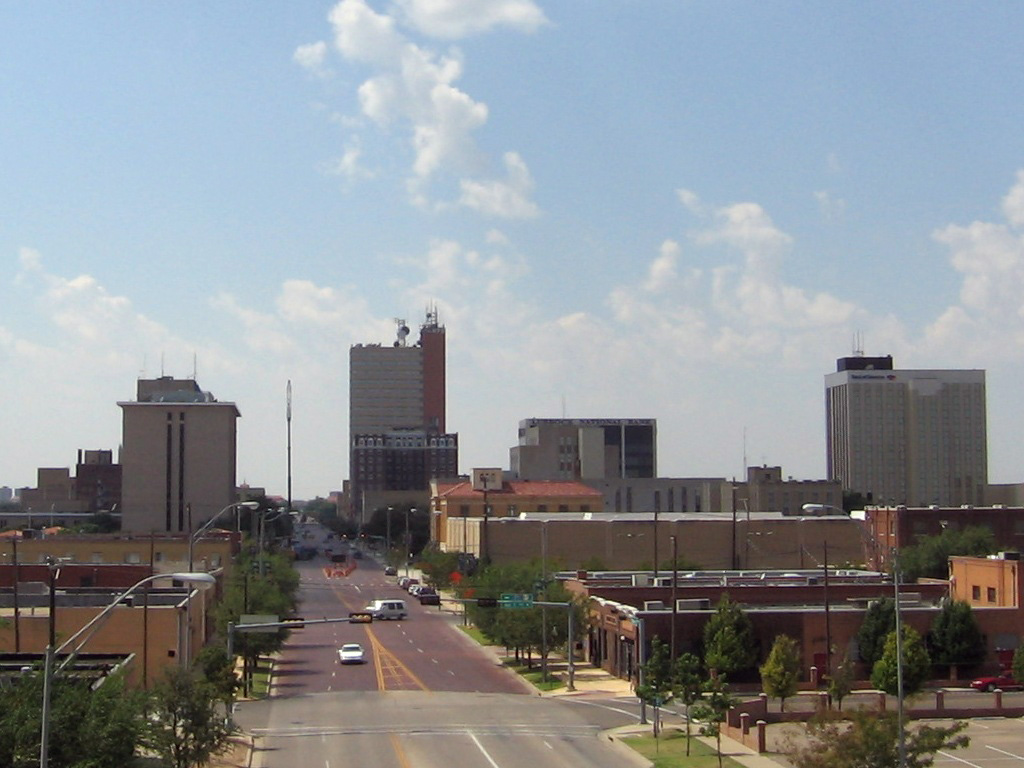
Downtown Lubbock, as seen from I-27

I-27 crosses over the Plainview Sub for the first time north of FM 1294 (Drew Street, exit 11), and another short gap exists in the frontage roads there. North of the overpass, the frontage roads are two-way; I-27 then passes through New Deal, bypassing the central part of the town to the west. Old US 87 between exits 13 and 15 is now Loop 461; at exit 15, I-27 begins to parallel the rail line, just to its west. Along this part of the highway, and other similar portions, slip ramps still connect the main lanes with the frontage roads, but intersecting roads pass over all four roadways and the railroad on a long bridge; a pair of two-way roadways connects the frontage roads to the crossroad, with the one on the east crossing the railroad at-grade.

As it approaches Abernathy, I-27 curves west away from the Plainview Sub. The old main road through the city, between exits 20 and 22, is now Loop 369; I-27 passes through 1.5 blocks to the east. Despite I-27's location north of Abernathy, 0.5 miles (0.80 km) west of the rail line, all interchanges between Abernathy and Hale Center, except the one at FM 54 (exit 24), use the same configuration where the intersecting road crosses over all roadways. Approaching Hale Center, I-27 curves northeast as it splits from FM 1424 (exit 36) at a simple diamond interchange. The freeway passes through the city one block east of the old road, now Business I-27-T (Bus. I-27-T), which is accessed at exits 36 and 38. As it leaves Hale Center, the I-27 turns to the northeast, following the northwest side of the rail line.

The next two interchanges along the railroad between Hale Center and Plainview use the same style, in which the crossroad goes over everything. Bus. I-27-U splits at exit 45, a modified Y interchange, to pass through Plainview, and I-27 travels west of that city on a bypass. The two outer interchanges on this bypass, FM 3466 (exit 48) and Quincy Street (exit 51), are handled in the same way as the interchanges along the railroad, but the other two, US 70 (exit 49) and SH 194 (exit 50), are standard diamonds. Between exits 49 and 50 is another overpass over the frontage roads, 24th Street—with no separate slip ramps. Bus. I-27-U ends at a trumpet interchange (exit 53) north of Plainview, where I-27 again begins to parallel the Plainview Sub to the west. Both interchanges between this one and the first split with US 87 (exit 61), a modified Y interchange south of Kress, continue the pattern with the crossroad bridging over everything.

After it leaves US 87, the I-27 is no longer next to the rail line, but it continues to handle interchanges as it does alongside the line, except at SH 86 (exit 74), a standard diamond interchange that serves Tulia. US 87 rejoins the freeway at a modified diamond interchange (exit 77) north of Tulia, at which I-27 crosses to the east side of the Plainview Sub before paralleling it to that side. After several of the typical interchanges adjacent to the railroad, US 87 splits again at a modified Y interchange (exit 88) south of Happy. Except for the northernmost one, all the interchanges on the bypass of Happy and Canyon are diamond interchanges; there is a break in the frontage road north of FM 3331 (exit 108), where I-27 crosses the Prairie Dog Town Fork Red River. Exits 109 (Country Club Road) and 110 (US 87 south, US 60 west) are integrated, with some access to one road provided via the other.

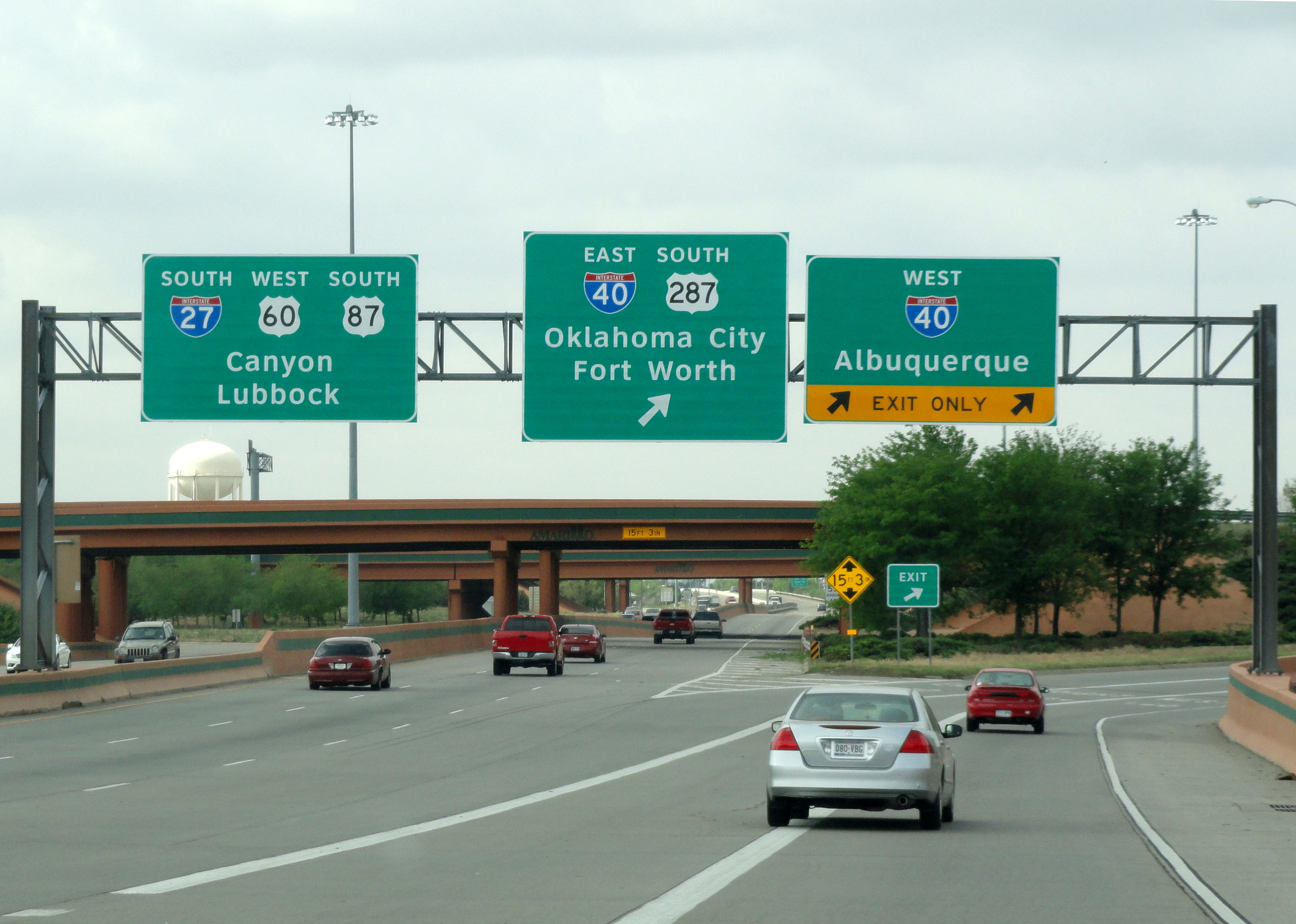
Current northern terminus at I-40 south of downtown Amarillo

I-27 is overlapped by US 60 and US 87 from exit 110 north of Canyon to the end of the Interstate in Amarillo; here, the frontage roads are one-way. Several near the south end are handled by bridging the intersecting road over all roadways, but, once I-27 crosses Loop 335 (exit 116), almost all interchanges are diamond interchanges. At exit 119A, which marks the south end of the six-lane cross section in Amarillo, Hillside Road passes under both the mainlanes and the frontage roads, with two ramps providing partial access. Other connections with Hillside Road are made via Western Street (exit 119B), which crosses the frontage roads at grade. The end of I-27 at I-40 (exit 123B) is a fully directional turbine interchange; US 287 also passes through, using I-40 to the east and US 60/US 87 to the north. Four lanes continue beyond I-40 and are joined by several from the I-40 ramps, making the northernmost portion of the Canyon Expressway five lanes in each direction. Several blocks beyond I-40, the highway ends at a split into two one-way pairs. Northbound traffic feeds onto Fillmore Street (US 87 north) and Buchanan Street (US 60 east and US 287 north), while southbound traffic approaches on Taylor Street (US 287 south) and Pierce Street (US 60 west and US 87 south). The top of the five northbound lanes is a barrier-separated from the rest, forcing traffic to exit I-40 west onto Buchanan Street. Through the I-40 interchange and the split, the frontage roads are discontinuous.

== History ==
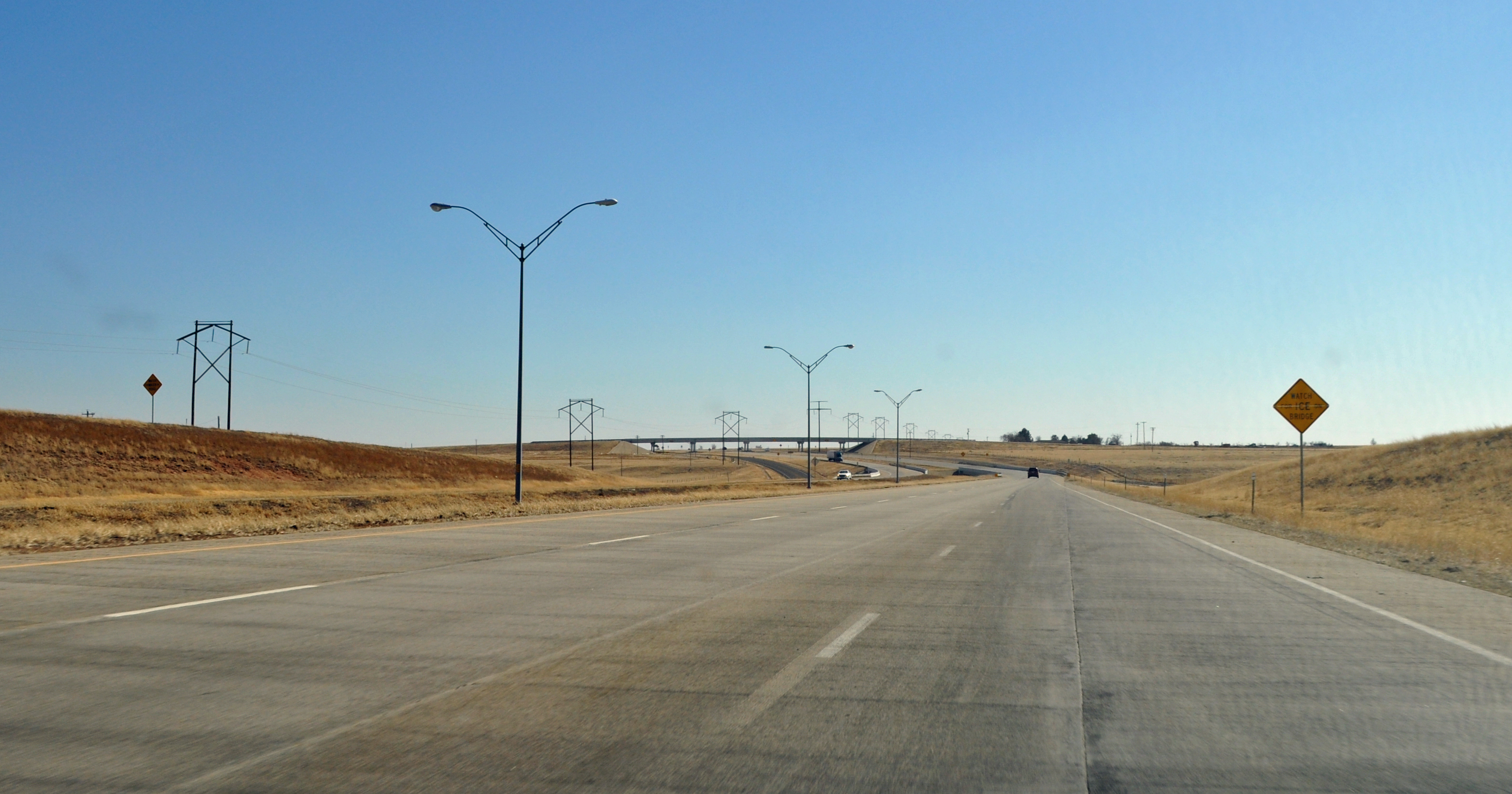
I-27 in Tulia

The roadway between Lubbock and Amarillo was part of the Puget Sound to Gulf Highway (SH 9), one of the original state highways defined in 1917. In 1926, it became part of US 385, which was absorbed into US 87 in 1935. The SH 9 overlap was dropped in the 1939 renumbering. Paving began in 1929 near Plainview and was almost complete by 1940, with only about eight miles (13 km) south of Canyon still bituminous surfaced until later that decade. The Canyon Expressway, a freeway upgrade of US 87 (also US 60 there) between Canyon and Amarillo, was built in the late 1950s and early 1960s. This highway, with a design speed of 45 mph (72 km/h), included frontage roads along its entire length and ended in each city with a Y interchange: the split of US 60 and US 87 in Canyon, and a split between the two oneway pairs of Taylor and Fillmore streets and Pierce and Buchanan streets in Amarillo. The Dumas Expressway, a freeway upgrade of US 87 north from Amarillo, opened several years later, feeding into the same one-way pairs.

Four-laning of US 87 from Canyon to Lubbock was completed in the late 1960s, with the last section to be widened lying between Abernathy and Lubbock. While this was built as a surface divided highway south of Canyon, short sections of freeway were built through New Deal, Abernathy, and Hale Center, and interchanges were built at US 70 and SH 194 on the new bypass of Plainview and at SH 86 (toward the west) south of Tulia. The original two-lane road, where bypassed, became Loop 461 (in New Deal in 1968; marked as Bus. US 87-G), Loop 369 (in Abernathy in 1962), a local street (in Hale Center), and Loop 445 (in Plainview in 1967; marked as Bus. US 87-G).

I-27 was not part of the original Interstate Highway System chosen in the 1950s; the spur from I-40 to Lubbock was authorized with the Federal-Aid Highway Act of 1968, which added 1,500 miles (2,400 km) to the system. George H. Mahon, member of the US House of Representatives from 1935 to 1979 and chair of the House Committee on Appropriations after 1964, helped secure funding for the road. Texas officially designated the highway in early 1969, originally running from US 62 near downtown Lubbock to I-40 in Amarillo; the definition was extended south through Lubbock to the south side of the loop in early 1976. The existing freeway sections, including the Canyon Expressway, were absorbed into I-27 despite not being built to Interstate standards. New construction began in 1975, from Lubbock north to New Deal, and most of the freeway was completed in the 1980s. Two long sections of US 87 were bypassed: Happy to Canyon on December 5, 1986, and Kress to Tulia soon after; I-27 was complete north of Lubbock by 1988. Most of the Happy–Canyon bypass was built along the two-lane FM 1541, which now ends at exit 103 southeast of Canyon.

The final section of I-27 to be built was through Lubbock, inside Loop 289; this was built in the early 1990s and completed on September 3, 1992. On that day, a ceremony at the 34th Street overpass opened the road from 19th Street (US 62) to 54th Street, completing Texas's 3,200-mile (5,100 km) portion of the Interstate Highway System. At its south end, the new I-27 connected to an existing freeway upgrade of US 87, built about 1970, to a traffic circle at US 84 (just north of Loop 289). The old route of US 87 through Lubbock became Bus. US 87-G upon completion of I-27. Two business loops of I-27 have been designated: through Plainview (former Loop 445) in early 1991 and through Hale Center (formerly a local street) in 2002.

The completion of I-27, costing a total of $453.4 million (equivalent to $907 million in 2024), encouraged growth along the highway: toward the northside of Lubbock and the southwest in Amarillo. Many other areas of Lubbock, however, have not seen this growth. Plainview, the largest city between Lubbock and Amarillo, has the only significant retail cluster outside the two terminal cities and has attracted several industries.

On September 5, 2024, the Federal Highway Administration (FHWA) approved a 4.2-mile (6.8 km) southern extension of I-27 from its previous terminus at Loop 289 to 0.1 miles (0.16 km) north of County Road 7500, the new limit for access control on the US 87 freeway north of that point. The Texas Transportation Commission would later also approve the extension at their meeting on September 26, 2024.

== Future ==
In 1995, a study of a southern extension of I-27 to I-10 found that a full freeway extension would not be economically feasible, instead recommending limited upgrades to the three corridors studied: SH 349 via Midland and Odessa to east of Fort Stockton, US 87 via Big Spring to Sonora or Junction, and US 84 via Sweetwater to Sonora or Junction. Of the three corridors, the Sweetwater route came the closest to warranting a freeway. The Transportation Equity Act for the 21st Century, passed in 1998, designated I-27 as part of the Ports-to-Plains Corridor, a High Priority Corridor from Mexico at Laredo to Denver. This corridor crosses I-20 at Big Spring and Midland (via a split) and I-10 at Sonora. The part of the Ports-to-Plains Corridor within Texas was a proposed Trans-Texas Corridor. Some parts of this plan have I-14 possibly ending where I-27 will cross I-20. The Texas Department of Transportation (TxDOT) recommends studying I-27 extension again. I-27 is planned to be extended from Loop 289 to FM 1585 (Loop 88).

On June 10, 2019, Governor Greg Abbott signed Texas House Bill 1079, which authorizes a comprehensive study to extend I-27 north of Amarillo and south of Lubbock to Laredo. The proposed route south of Lubbock would have the Interstate go to Lamesa, then split with one route going toward Midland and the other traveling to Big Spring. The two routes would then merge near Sterling City, travel through San Angelo and Del Rio, travel near the border until Eagle Pass, turn east to Carrizo Springs, then travel south to Laredo.

In March 2024, TxDOT released an implementation plan that listed all the projects that were planned for the I-27 project in the state.

In June 2024, it was announced that I-27 would potentially run along the Heartland Expressway and the Theodore Roosevelt Expressway through Nebraska, South Dakota, North Dakota, and Montana. It also forms part of the Great Plains International Trade Corridor, continuing north to Saskatoon, Saskatchewan. Currently, no Interstates connect to Saskatchewan.

=== Numbering ===
On March 15, 2022, the 2022 Consolidated Appropriations Act was signed by President Joe Biden that added the extension of I-27 north to Raton, New Mexico, and south to Laredo to the Interstate Highway System. A bill introduced in March 2023 would explicitly designate the extension as I-27 with two auxiliary routes numbered I-227 and I-327. I-227 is proposed to be routed via SH 158 from Sterling City to Midland and SH 349 from Midland to Lamesa; I-327 would utilize US 287 from Dumas to the Oklahoma state line. It would also formally name the Interstate the Ports-to-Plains Corridor. The bill was introduced by legislators from both Texas and New Mexico. On August 1, 2023, the legislation passed through the U.S. Senate with some slight modifications; I-227 was redesignated as I-27W with I-27 between Sterling City and Lamesa redesignated as I-27E and I-327 was redesignated as I-27N. The act was passed again by the Senate in March 2024 after some changes were made in the U.S. House of Representatives in December 2023.

== Exit list ==
County	Location	mi	km	Old exit	New exit	Destinations	Notes
Lubbock		526.0	846.5		526	US 87 south / County Road 7500 – Tahoka	Current southern terminus; current southern terminus of the Tahoka Highway freeway; roadway continues south as US 87
Lubbock		527.7	849.3		527	Loop 88 west / FM 1585	Future stack interchange; current eastern end of Loop 88
Lubbock		528.4	850.4		528	114th Street	
Lubbock	Lubbock	529.4	852.0		529	98th Street	
Lubbock	Lubbock	530.0	853.0	1	530	US 84 / Loop 289 / 82nd Street – Post	Signed as exits 530 (82nd Street), 530A (Loop 289 west) and 530B (US 84 / Loop 289 east) southbound; roadway continues as US 87 south
Lubbock	Lubbock	531.3	855.0	1A	531	50th Street – Buffalo Springs Lake, Ransom Canyon	Signed as exit 530C southbound
Lubbock	Lubbock	532.2	856.5	2	532	34th Street (FM 835) / Buddy Holly Avenue	
Lubbock	Lubbock	533.3	858.3	3	533	US 62 / SH 114 (19th Street) – Floydada, Levelland, Texas Tech University	
Lubbock	Lubbock	533.7	858.9	3A	533A	13th Street, Broadway	Northbound exit and southbound entrance
Lubbock	Lubbock	534.3	859.9	4	534	US 82 (Marsha Sharp Freeway) – Crosbyton, Brownfield, Texas Tech University	
Lubbock	Lubbock	535.2	861.3	5	535	Buddy Holly Avenue / Municipal Drive	Southbound exit and northbound entrance
Lubbock	Lubbock	536.2	862.9	6A	536A	Spur 326 (Avenue Q)	Southbound exit and northbound entrance
Lubbock	Lubbock	536.6	863.6	6B	536B	Loop 289	Signed as exit 536 northbound
Lubbock	Lubbock	537.4	864.9	7	537	Yucca Lane	
Lubbock	Lubbock	538.1	866.0	8	538	FM 2641 (Regis Street) – Lubbock Preston Smith International Airport	
Lubbock	Lubbock	539.1	867.6	9	539	Lubbock Preston Smith International Airport, General Aviation, FAA	
Lubbock	Lubbock	540.5	869.9	10	540	Keuka Street	
Lubbock	Lubbock	541.6	871.6	11	541	FM 1294 – Shallowater	
Lubbock		542.5	873.1	12	542	County Road 58	Northbound exit and southbound entrance
Lubbock	New Deal	543.5	874.7	13	543	Loop 461 north – New Deal	
Lubbock	New Deal	544.6	876.4	14	544	FM 1729	
Lubbock	New Deal	545.6	878.1	15	545	Loop 461 south – New Deal	Southbound exit and northbound entrance
Lubbock		547.7	881.4	17	547	County Road 53	
Lubbock		550.5	885.9	20	550	FM 597 (Loop 369 north) – Abernathy, Anton	Northbound exit and southbound entrance
Hale	Abernathy	551.3	887.2	21	551	FM 597 / FM 2060 / Main Street	
Hale	Abernathy	552.3	888.8	22	552	Loop 369 south – Abernathy	Southbound exit and northbound entrance
Hale		554.3	892.1	24	554	FM 54 – Spade, Petersburg	
Hale		557.6	897.4	27	557	County Road	
Hale		561.7	904.0	31	561	FM 37 east	South end of FM 37 overlap
Hale		562.6	905.4	32	562	FM 37 west – Cotton Center, Fieldton	North end of FM 37 overlap
Hale		566.3	911.4	36	566	FM 1424 north / Main Street (I-27 Bus. north)	
Hale	Hale Center	567.7	913.6	37	567	FM 1914 (Cleveland Street)	
Hale		568.5	914.9	38	568	Main Street (I-27 Bus. south)	Southbound exit and northbound entrance
Hale		571.2	919.3	41	571	County Road	
Hale		573.6	923.1	43	573	FM 2337	
Hale		575.3	925.9	45	575	I-27 BL north – Plainview	
Hale	Plainview	578.0	930.2	48	578	FM 3466 – Hale County Airport	Northbound exit and southbound entrance
Hale	Plainview	579.5	932.6	49	579	US 70 – Plainview, Floydada, Muleshoe	
Hale	Plainview	580.8	934.7	50	580	SH 194 – Wayland Baptist University, Hart	
Hale	Plainview	581.8	936.3	51	582	Quincy Street	
Hale		583.1	938.4	53	583	I-27 BL south – Plainview	
Hale		584.2	940.2	54	584	FM 3183	
Hale		586.2	943.4	56	586	FM 788 – Edmonson	
Swisher		591.3	951.6	61	591	US 87 north / County Road – Kress	North end of US 87 overlap
Swisher		593.2	954.7	63	593	FM 145 – Kress	
Swisher		598.4	963.0	68	598	FM 928	
Swisher	Tulia	604.5	972.8	74	604	SH 86 – Tulia	
Swisher	Tulia	605.6	974.6	75	605	NW 6th Street	
Swisher		607.5	977.7	77	607	US 87 south – Tulia	South end of US 87 overlap
Swisher		612.0	984.9	82	612	FM 214	
Swisher		613.1	986.7	83	613	FM 2698	
Swisher		618.2– 618.6	994.9– 995.5	88	618	US 87 north / FM 1881 – Happy	North end of US 87 overlap; signed as exits 618A (FM 1881) and 618B (US 87 north) northbound
Swisher–Randall county line	Happy	620.2	998.1	90	620	FM 1075 – Happy	
Randall		622.2	1,001.3	92	622	Haley Road	
Randall		624.1	1,004.4	94	624	FM 285 – Wayside	
Randall		626.3	1,007.9	96	626	Dowlen Road	
Randall		629.4	1,012.9	99	629	Hungate Road	
Randall		633.5	1,019.5	103	633	FM 1541 north / Cemetery Road	
Randall	Canyon	636.7	1,024.7	106	636	SH 217 – Canyon, Palo Duro Canyon State Park	
Randall		638.2	1,027.1	108	638	To US 60 west (Hunsley Road) / FM 3331 – Hereford	
Randall		639.6	1,029.3	109	639	Country Club Road	
Randall		640.4	1,030.6	110	640	US 60 west / US 87 south – Canyon, Hereford	South end of US 60/US 87 overlap; no northbound exit
Randall		641.8	1,032.9	111	641	Rockwell Road	
Randall		642.9	1,034.6	112	642	FM 2219	
Randall		643.8	1,036.1	113	643	McCormick Road	
Randall		646.1	1,039.8	115	646	Sundown Lane	
Randall	Amarillo	647.1	1,041.4	116	647	Loop 335 (Hollywood Road)	
Randall	Amarillo	648.0	1,042.9	117	648	Bell Street / Arden Road	
Randall	Amarillo	649.6	1,045.4	119	649	Hillside Road / Western Street / 58th Avenue	Signed as exits 649A (Hillside Road west) and 649B (Western Street / 58th Avenue) southbound
Randall	Amarillo	650.3	1,046.6	120A	649C	Republic Avenue	Southbound exit and northbound entrance
Randall	Amarillo	650.8	1,047.4	120B	650A	45th Avenue	
Randall	Amarillo	651.2	1,048.0	121A	650B	Georgia Street	
Randall	Amarillo	651.8	1,049.0	121B	651	Hawthorne Drive / Austin Street	Southbound exit and northbound entrance
Randall	Amarillo	652.2	1,049.6	122A	651	Parker Street / Moss Lane	Northbound exit and southbound entrance
Randall	Amarillo	652.8	1,050.6	122B	652A	FM 1541 (Washington Street) / 34th Avenue	
Randall	Amarillo	653.4	1,051.5	122C	652B	34th Street / Tyler Street	Southbound exit and northbound entrance
Potter	Amarillo	653.7	1,052.0	123A	653A	26th Avenue	
Potter	Amarillo	654.1	1,052.7	123B	653B	I-40 / US 287 south – Oklahoma City, Fort Worth, Albuquerque	Current northern terminus; I-40 exit 70
Potter	Amarillo	654.1	1,052.7			US 60 east / US 87 north / US 287 north – Dumas, Pampa, Downtown	Freeway continues as US 60 east / US 87 north / US 287 north
1.000 mi = 1.609 km; 1.000 km = 0.621 mi: Concurrency terminus; Incomplete access

== Business routes ==
=== Hale Center ===
Business Interstate 27-T
- Location: Hale Center
- Length: 1.168 mi (1.880 km)
- Existed: 2002–present

Business Interstate 27-T (Bus. I-27-T) is a 1.168-mile-long (1.880 km) business loop in Hale Center between exits 566 and 568 of I-27. It was bypassed in about 1962 but was turned over to the city until April 5, 2002, when the new business route was authorized. Along the way, it intersects FM 1914 (Cleveland Street).

Major intersections
The entire route is in Hale Center, Hale County.

mi	km	Destinations	Notes
0.0	0.0	I-27 / US 87	I-27 exit 566
0.5	0.80	FM 1914 (Cleveland Street)	
1.168	1.880	I-27 / US 87	I-27 exit 568
1.000 mi = 1.609 km; 1.000 km = 0.621 mi

=== Plainview ===
Business Interstate 27-U
- Location: Plainview
- Length: 9.282 mi (14.938 km)
- Existed: 1990–present

Business Interstate 27-U (Bus. I-27-U) is a 9.282-mile (14.938 km) business loop in Plainview.
