= Interstate 27 Business (Plainview, Texas) =

Business Interstate 27-U

Route information
- Maintained by TxDOT
- Length: 9.282 mi (14.938 km)
- Existed: June 21, 1990–present

Major junctions
- South end: I-27 / US 87 near Plainview
- US 70 in Plainview
- North end: I-27 / US 87 near Plainview

Location
- Country: United States
- State: Texas
- Counties: Hale

Highway system
- Interstate Highway System; Main; Auxiliary; Suffixed; Business; Future; Highways in Texas; Interstate; US; State; Former; Toll; Loops; Spurs; FM/RM; Park; Rec

Business Interstate 27-U (Bus. I-27-U) is a business loop in the US state of Texas. It stretches 9.282 miles (14.938 km) along Columbia Street through Plainview between exits 575 and 583 on Interstate 27 (I-27). The highway follows the original alignment of U.S. Route 87 (US 87) prior to the construction of the new freeway to the west. Before becoming Bus. I-27-U, it was designated as Loop 445 and signed as a business route of US 87. Along the way, it intersects Farm to Market Road 3466 (FM 3466, South 4th Street), US 70 (5th Street), and FM 1767 (34th Street).

== History ==

The highway follows the original routing of US 87 through the city of Plainview. When the new US 87 freeway was built to the west, this segment was redesignated Loop 445, the Plainview Loop, on January 31, 1967, and marked as a business route of US 87. On June 21, 1990, Loop 445 was redesignated Bus. I-27-U.

== Route description ==
Bus. I-27-U leaves I-27 south of Plainview at exit 575 and heads northeast toward the city. The highway begins as a four-lane road, with a wide median dividing the two directions. The road passes through several miles of farmland before entering Plainview and passing the Hale County Jail. The roadway continues past a small elementary school, several residential streets, the Hale County Airport, and an auto junkyard before intersecting with US 70 in downtown Plainview. The highway continues through downtown, intersecting several city blocks, and passing several parks and businesses. In the northern section of downtown, the road passes a small railroad depot, and a set of railroad tracks come alongside the eastbound lanes of the highway. The highway continues north from there, passing several more residential streets before intersecting I-27 in the northern region of Plainview. This intersection is the highway's northern terminus.

== Junction list ==
The entire route is in Hale County.

Location	mi	km	Destinations	Notes
	0.0	0.0	I-27 / US 87	I-27 exit 575
Plainview	4.4	7.1	FM 3466 (SW 4th Street)	
Plainview	5.0	8.0	US 70 (5th Street)	
Plainview	8.7	14.0	FM 1767 (34th Street)	
Plainview	9.6	15.4	I-27 / US 87	I-27 exit 583
1.000 mi = 1.609 km; 1.000 km = 0.621 mi
