= McLean Independent School District =

School district in Texas

Coordinates: 35.2350°N 100.5979°W

McLean Independent School District is a public school district based in McLean, Texas, United States. Located in Gray County, small portions of the district extend into Collingsworth, Donley, and Wheeler Counties. The community of Alanreed also lies within the district. McLean ISD has one school that serves students from prekindergarten through grade 12. In 2009, the school district was rated "recognized" by the Texas Education Agency.
