= List of Interstate Highways in Texas =

Dwight D. Eisenhower National System of Interstate and Defense Highways
- Highway markers for Interstate 10, Interstate 410, and Interstate 20 Business loop
- Interstate Highways highlighted in red

System information
- Maintained by TxDOT
- Length: 3,274.7 mi (5,270.1 km)
- Formed: June 29, 1956

Highway names
- Interstates: Interstate X (I-X); Interstate Highway X (IH X)
- US Highways: U.S. Highway X (US X)
- State: State Highway X (SH X)
- Loops: Loop X
- Spurs: Spur X
- Recreational: Recreational Road X (RE X)
- Farm or Ranch to Market Roads: Farm to Market Road X (FM X); Ranch to Market Road X (RM X)
- Park Roads: Park Road X (PR X)

System links
- Highways in Texas; Interstate; US; State; Former; Toll; Loops; Spurs; FM/RM; Park; Rec

The Interstate Highways in Texas are all owned and maintained by the U.S. state of Texas. The Texas Department of Transportation (TxDOT) is the agency responsible for the day-to-day maintenance and operations of the Interstate Highways in Texas. The Interstate Highway System in Texas covers 3,239.7 miles (5,213.8 km) and consists of twelve primary routes, seven auxiliary routes and Interstate 35 (I-35) which is split into two branches, I-35E and I-35W, that provide access to both Fort Worth and Dallas. The longest segment of Interstate Highway in Texas is I-10 at 878.6 miles (1,414.0 km); the shortest is I-110 at 0.9 miles (1.4 km).

The construction of the Interstate Highway System in Texas began well before these routes were designated as Interstate Highways. A 50-mile (80 km) stretch of I-45 between Galveston and Houston was opened in 1951, eight years before it was designated I-45. It was also the first urban expressway in Texas. In 1962, 43 miles (69 km) of I-35 opened in Bexar County, the first section of Interstate Highway to open from county line to county line in a large metropolitan area. Portions of I-10 west of San Antonio took much longer to complete due to the vast open spaces and lack of nearby labor. The majority of the construction of this section of I-10 occurred in the 1970s and 1980s and was complete by the early 1990s. The section east of San Antonio was completed 20 years earlier in 1972. The opening of a 6-mile (10 km) section of I-27 in 1992 completed the Interstate Highway System in Texas.

Planning is ongoing for a proposed extension of I-69 southward from its original terminus in Indiana through Texas to the United States–Mexico border. If complete as planned, I-69 will extend about 650 miles (1,050 km) across Texas, from the Louisiana state line in the Texarkana–Shreveport area to South Texas. The first 6.2-mile (10.0 km) portion was approved in 2011, with signage posted December 6, 2011.

== Primary Interstate Highways ==
Number	Length (mi)	Length (km)	Southern or western terminus	Northern or eastern terminus	Formed	Removed	Notes
I-2	46.8	75.3	US 83/Bus. US 83 in La Joya	I-69E/US 77/US 83 in Harlingen	2013	current	Lowest numbered route in the system; Intersects I-69C in Pharr
I-10	877.455	1,412.127	I-10/US 85/US 180 at New Mexico state line in Anthony	I-10/US 90 at Louisiana state line in Orange	1959	current	Intersects I-110 in El Paso; I-20 between Kent and Balmorhea; I-35, I-37, and I-410 in San Antonio; and I-45, I-69, and I-610 in Houston
I-14	25.90	41.68	US 190/SH 9 in Copperas Cove	I-35/US 190 near Belton	2017	current	Known as the Fourteenth Amendment Highway; to be extended west along US 190 to I-10 and I-20 and east to Louisiana
I-20	634.723	1,021.488	I-10 between Kent and Toyah	I-20 at Louisiana state line east of Waskom	1959	current	Intersects I-30, I-35W, and I-820 in Fort Worth; I-35E, I-45, and I-635 in Dallas; and future I-369 in Marshall
I-27	124.182	199.852	US 87/Loop 289 in Lubbock	I‑40/US 60/US 87/US 287 in Amarillo	1968	current	Extensions to Laredo and New Mexico signed into law on March 15, 2022
I-30	223.404	359.534	I-20 in Fort Worth	I-30/US 59/US 71 at Arkansas state line in Texarkana	1959	current	Intersects I-35W and I-820 in Fort Worth; I-35E, I-45, I-345, and I-635 in Dallas; and I-369 in Texarkana
I-35	407.195	655.317	I-35E & I-35W in Denton (Northern section) Fed. 85 at Juárez–Lincoln International Bridge in Laredo (Southern section)	I-35/US 77 at Oklahoma state line north of Gainesville (Northern section) I-35E & I-35W in Hillsboro (Southern section)	1959	current	Intersects I-69W in Laredo then I-10, I-37, and I-410 in San Antonio before branching at Hillsboro into I-35E and I-35W through Dallas and Fort Worth reuniting in Denton
I-35E	96.657	155.554	I-35 & I-35W in Hillsboro	I-35 & I-35W in Denton	1959	current	Eastern branch of I-35 through Dallas where it intersects I-20, I-30, and I-635
I-35W	85.283	137.250	I-35 & I-35E in Hillsboro	I-35 & I-35E in Denton	1959	current	Western branch of I-35 through Fort Worth where it intersects I-20, I-30, and I-820
I-37	142.787	229.793	US 181/SH 35 in Corpus Christi	I-35/US 281 in San Antonio	1959	current	Intersects I-69E in Corpus Christi; future I-69W east of George West; and both I-10 and I-410 in San Antonio
I-40	177.139	285.078	I-40 at New Mexico state line in Glenrio	I-40 at Oklahoma state line east of Shamrock	1959	current	Intersects I-27 in Amarillo
I-44	15.398	24.781	US 277/US 281/US 287 in Wichita Falls	I-44/US 277/US 281 at Oklahoma state line north of Burkburnett	1982	current	
I-45	284.913	458.523	SH 87 in Galveston	I-30, I-345, US 67 in Dallas	1959	current	Intersects I-10, I-69, and I-610 in Houston; and I-20 in Dallas
I-49	2	3.2	I-49/US 59/US 71 at Arkansas state line north of Texarkana	I-49 at Arkansas state line north of Texarkana	proposed	—	Links two Arkansas I-49 segments
I-69	75.3	121.2	US 59/Spur 529 in Rosenberg	US 59 near Cleveland	2011	current	Intersects I-10, I-45, and I-610 in Houston; The future I-69 will extend from I-69E/I-69W merger south of Victoria along US 59 to Tenaha intersecting I-369 before following US 84 to I-69 at Louisiana state line east of Joaquin
I-69C	18	29	I-2/US 83/US 281 in Pharr	US 281/FM 490 in Edinburg	2013	current	The future I-69C will follow US 281 ending at I-69W in George West
I-69E	81	130	Fed. 101/Fed. 180 at Veterans International Bridge in Brownsville US 77 in Kingsville	US 77 north of Raymondville I-37/US 77 in Corpus Christi	2013	current	Intersects I-169 in Olmito and I-2 in Harlingen; The future I-69E will follow US 77 to I-69/I-69W south of Victoria
I-69W	1.4	2.3	Fed. 85D at World Trade International Bridge in Laredo	US 59/Loop 20 in Laredo	2014	current	The future I-69W will follow US 59 to I-69/I-69E south of Victoria intersecting I-69C in George West and I-37 east of George West
Proposed and unbuilt

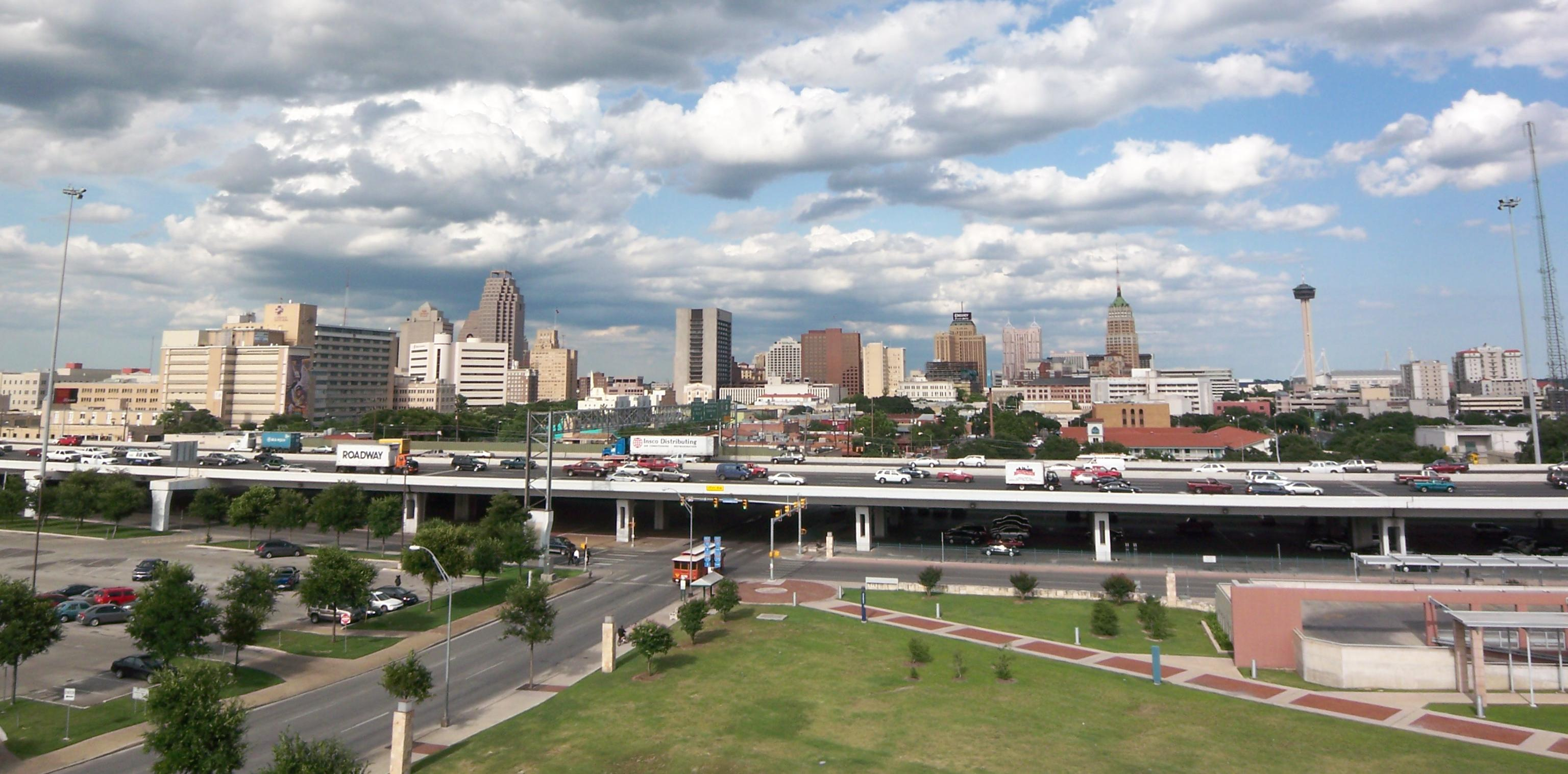
I-10 and I-35 run concurrently as an elevated freeway in Downtown San Antonio

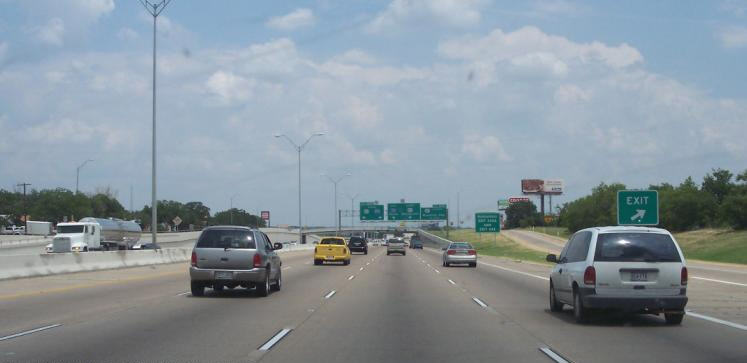
I-20 in southern Fort Worth

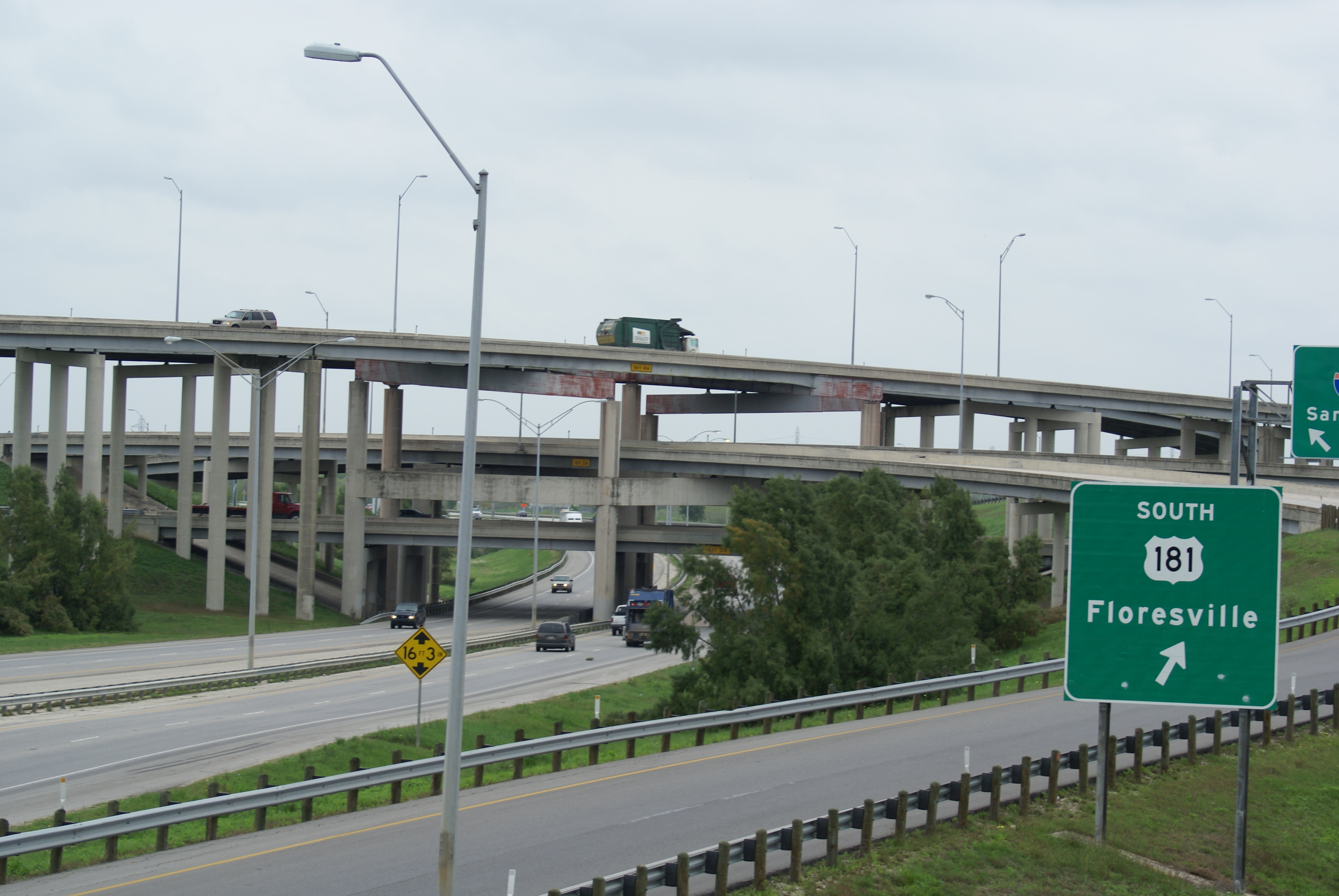
I-37 and I-410 interchange on the southeast side of San Antonio

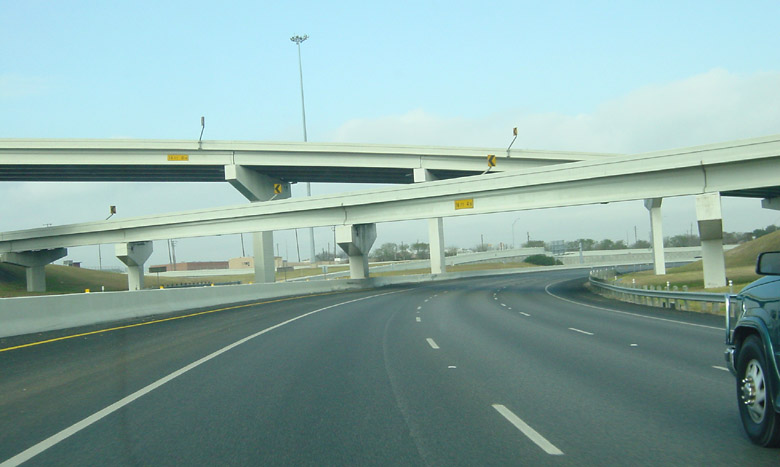
Interchange between I-37 and I-69E/US 77

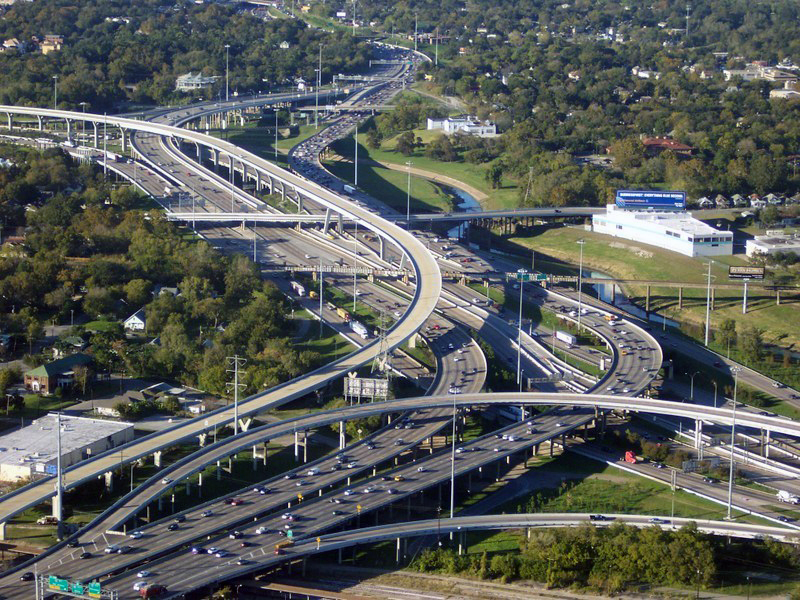
I-10/US 90 and I-45 near Downtown Houston

== Auxiliary Interstate Highways ==
Number	Length (mi)	Length (km)	Southern or western terminus	Northern or eastern terminus	Formed	Removed	Notes
I-110	0.891	1.434	Fed. 45 at Bridge of the Americas in El Paso	I-10/US 54/US 180 in El Paso	1967	current	Partially along US 54
I-169	1.5	2.4	Port of Brownsville	I-69E/US 77/US 83 in Olmito	2015	current	Frontage roads opened and signed as SH 550 from I-69E/US 77/US 83 to FM 3248 in 2011 and from FM 3248 to the Port of Brownsville in 2013; main lanes opened and co-signed with SH 550 from I-69E/US 77/US 83 to Old Alice Road in 2015, main lanes currently under construction from Old Alice Road to the Port of Brownsville and should be completed by 2016, it will be a toll route once fully completed
I-345	1.400	2.253	I-30/I-45/US 67 in Dallas	US 75/Spur 366 in Dallas	1964	current	Unsigned
I-369	3.5	5.6	US 59/SH 93/Loop 151 in Texarkana	I-30/US 59 in Texarkana	2013	current	Proposed extension along US 59 to I-69 in Tenaha; intersects I-20
I-410	49.488	79.643	Beltway around San Antonio		1959	current	Intersects I-10, I-35, and I-37
I-610	37.972	61.110	Beltway around Houston		1959	current	Intersects I-10, I-45, and I-69
I-635	36.999	59.544	I-20 in Balch Springs	SH 121 in Grapevine	1959	current	Partial Dallas beltway; intersects I-30, and I-35E
I-820	35.173	56.605	I-20 in Fort Worth	I-20/US 287 in Fort Worth	1959	current	Partial Fort Worth beltway; intersects I-30 and I-35W

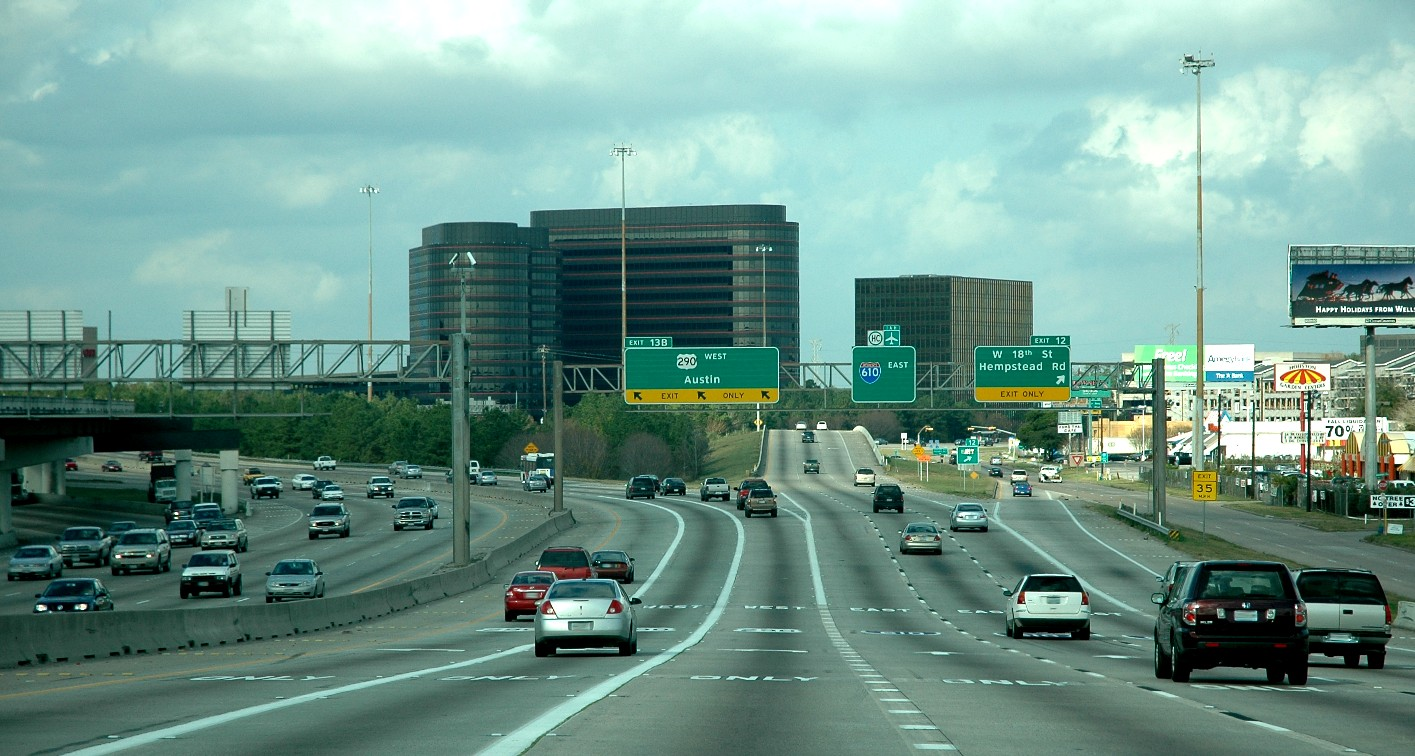
I-610 at US 290 in Houston

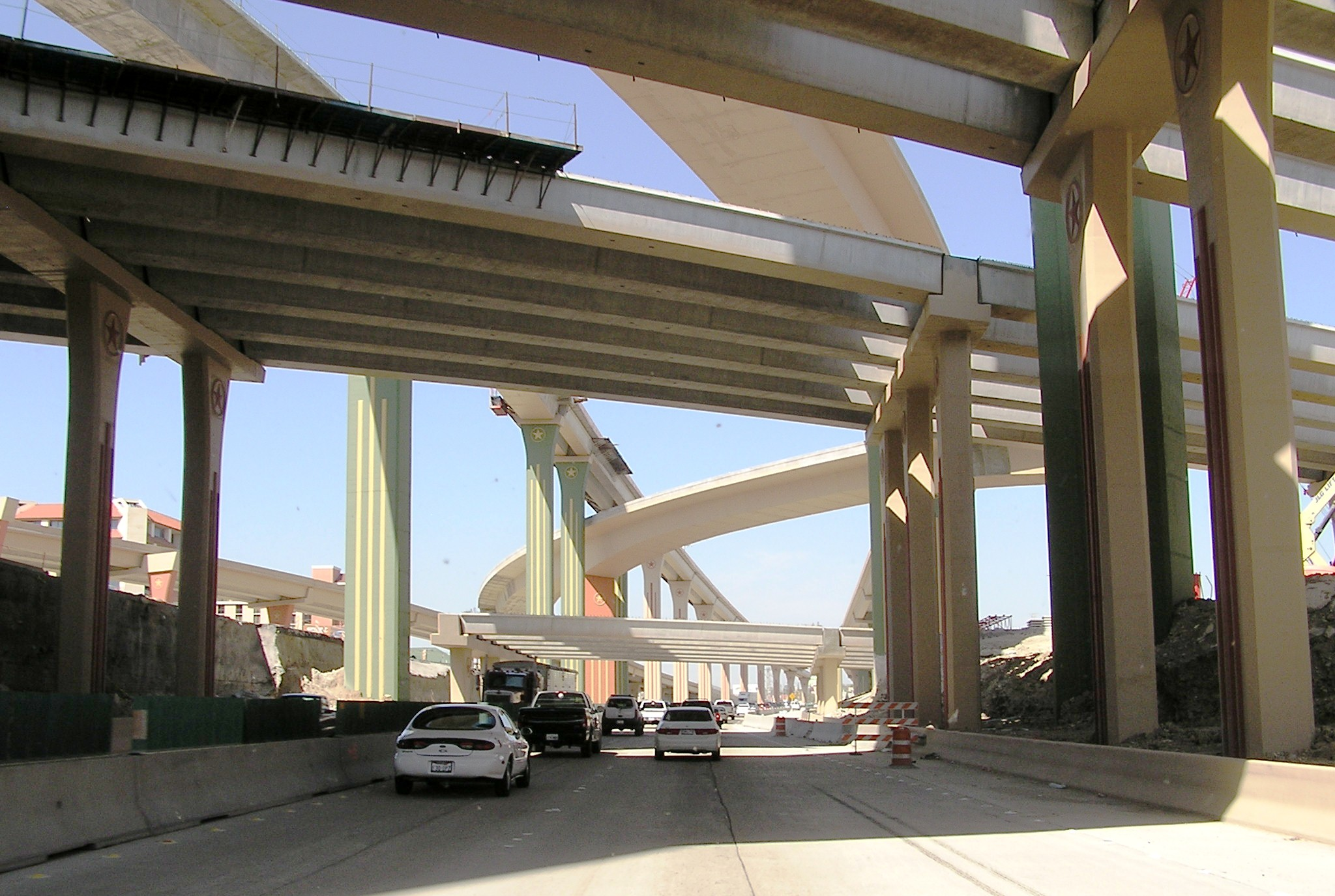
The High Five Interchange at I-635 and US 75 in Dallas

== Business Interstate Highways ==
Number	Length (mi) (Note: Official route lengths do not include segments that run concurrently with other highways of greater hierarchy)	Length (km)	Southern or western terminus	Northern or eastern terminus	Formed	Removed	Notes
I-10 BL	2.747	4.421	I-10 in Sierra Blanca	I-10 in Sierra Blanca	1990	current	Formerly Loop 416 signed as Bus. US 80
I-10 BL	2.881	4.637	I-10 in Van Horn	I-10 in Van Horn	1990	current	Formerly Loop 519 signed as Bus. US 80
I-10 BL	2.000	3.219	I-10/FM 2903 north of Balmorhea	I-10/SH 17 east of Balmorhea	1991	current	Formerly part of US 290 and FM 2903
I-10 BL	1.398	2.250	I-10/US 67 in Fort Stockton	I-10/US 67/US 385 in Fort Stockton	1991	current	Formerly part of US 290
I-20 BL	14.042	22.598	I-20 west of Pecos	I-20 east of Barstow	1991	current	Formerly part of US 80
I-20 BL	8.223	13.234	I-20 west of Monahans	I-20 in Monahans	1991	current	Formerly part of US 80
I-20 BL	31.761	51.114	I-20 in West Odessa	I-20 east of Midland	1991	current	Formerly part of US 80
I-20 BL	4.687	7.543	I-20 west of Stanton	I-20 east of Stanton	1995	current	Formerly Loop 214 preceded by US 80
I-20 BL	5.609	9.027	I-20 west of Big Spring	I-20 in Big Spring	1990	current	Formerly Loop 402 signed as Bus. US 80
I-20 BL	1.069	1.720	I-20/FM 670 west of Westbrook	I-20 in Westbrook	1990	current	Formerly Loop 333 preceded by US 80
I-20 BL	5.926	9.537	I-20 west of Colorado City	I-20 east of Colorado City	1990	current	Formerly Loop 377 signed as Bus. US 80
I-20 BL	1.633	2.628	I-20 west of Loraine	I-20 in Loraine	1990	current	Formerly Loop 316 preceded by US 80
I-20 BS	1.644	2.646	I-20 west of Roscoe	Bus. US 84/FM 608 in Roscoe	1990	current	Formerly Loop 237 preceded by US 80
I-20 BL	6.448	10.377	I-20/US 84 west of Sweetwater	I-20/US 84/SH 70 in Sweetwater	1990	current	Formerly Loop 432 signed as Bus. US 80
I-20 BL	2.076	3.341	I-20/US 84 west of Trent	I-20/US 84 east of Trent	1990	current	Formerly Loop 319 preceded by US 80
I-20 BL	2.786	4.484	I-20/US 84 west of Merkel	I-20/US 84/FM 1235 east of Merkel	1990	current	Formerly Loop 39 preceded by US 80
I-20 BL	1.661	2.673	I-20/US 84 in Tye	I-20/US 84 in Tye	1990	current	Formerly Loop 320 preceded by US 80
I-20 BL	8.466	13.625	I-20/US 84 in Tye	I-20 in Abilene	1990	current	Formerly Loop 355 signed as Bus. US 80
I-20 BL	2.826	4.548	I-20/FM 2047 west of Baird	I-20 east of Baird	1990	current	Formerly Loop 425 preceded by US 80
I-27 BL	1.168	1.880	I-27/US 87 in Hale Center	I-27/US 87 in Hale Center	2002	current	
I-27 BL	9.282	14.938	I-27/US 87 south of Plainview	I-27/US 87 in Plainview	1990	current	Formerly Loop 445 signed as Bus. US 87
I-35 BL	3.400	5.472	Fed. 85 at Gateway to the Americas International Bridge in Laredo	I-35/US 83 in Laredo	1991	current	Segment formerly Bus. US 83 and Loop 420 preceded by US 81/US 83
I-35 BL	1.222	1.967	I-35 south of Encinal	I-35/SH 44 north of Encinal	1990	current	Formerly Loop 532 signed as Bus. US 81
I-35 BL	2.872	4.622	I-35 south of Cotulla	I-35 in Cotulla	1991	current	Formerly part of US 81
I-35 BL	4.147	6.674	I-35 south of Dilley	I-35 north of Dilley	1991	current	Formerly part of US 81
I-35 BL	5.449	8.769	I-35/FM 1581 in Pearsall	I-35 north of Pearsall	1991	current	Segment formerly part of US 81
I-35 BL	4.488	7.223	I-35 in New Braunfels	I-35 in New Braunfels	1991	current	Formerly part of US 81
I-35 BL	1.461	2.351	I-35 in Kyle	I-35 in Kyle	1990	current	Formerly part of US 81
I-35 BL	3.648	5.871	I-35 in Round Rock	I-35/FM 3406 in Round Rock	1990	2013	Formerly Loop 384 signed as Bus. US 81; segment now Spur 379
I-35 BL	5.1	8.2	I-35 in Georgetown	I-35 in Georgetown	1990	2006	Formerly Loop 418 signed as Bus. US 81; segments now Spur 26 and Spur 158
I-35 BL	2.288	3.682	I-35W in Alvarado	I-35W in Alvarado	1990	current	Formerly Loop 392 signed as Bus. US 81
I-35 BL	1.883	3.030	I-35 in Sanger	I-35 in Sanger	1991	current	Formerly Spur 138; a portion preceded by part of US 77
I-40 BL	0.779	1.254	Historic US 66 at New Mexico state line in Glenrio	I-40 east of Glenrio	1990	current	Formerly Spur 504; segment preceded by part of US 66
I-40 BL	2.369	3.813	I-40 west of Adrian	I-40 east of Adrian	1990	current	Formerly Loop 550 preceded by part of US 66
I-40 BL	3.395	5.464	I-40 west of Vega	I-40 east of Vega	1990	current	Formerly Loop 551 preceded by part of US 66
I-40 BL	14.125	22.732	I-40 west of Amarillo	I-40 east of Amarillo	1990	current	Formerly Loop 552 preceded by part of US 66
I-40 BL	3.533	5.686	I-40 west of Groom	I-40 east of Groom	1990	current	Formerly Loop 554 preceded by part of US 66
I-40 BL	3.796	6.109	I-40 west of McLean	I-40 east of McLean	1990	current	Formerly Loop 555 preceded by part of US 66
I-40 BL	2.770	4.458	I-40 west of Shamrock	I-40 east of Shamrock	1993	current	Formerly Loop 556 preceded by part of US 66
I-45 BL	6.367	10.247	I-45 in Corsicana	I-45/US 287 north of Corsicana	1990	current	Formerly Loop 564 preceded by part of US 75
I-45 BL	4.512	7.261	I-45 in Ennis	I-45 in Ennis	1990	current	Formerly Loop 563 preceded by part of US 75
I-45 BL	2.330	3.750	I-45 in Palmer	I-45 north of Palmer	1990	current	Formerly Loop 562 preceded by part of US 75
I-45 BL	3.367	5.419	I-45 south of Ferris	I-45 north of Ferris	1990	current	Formerly Loop 560 preceded by part of US 75
Former

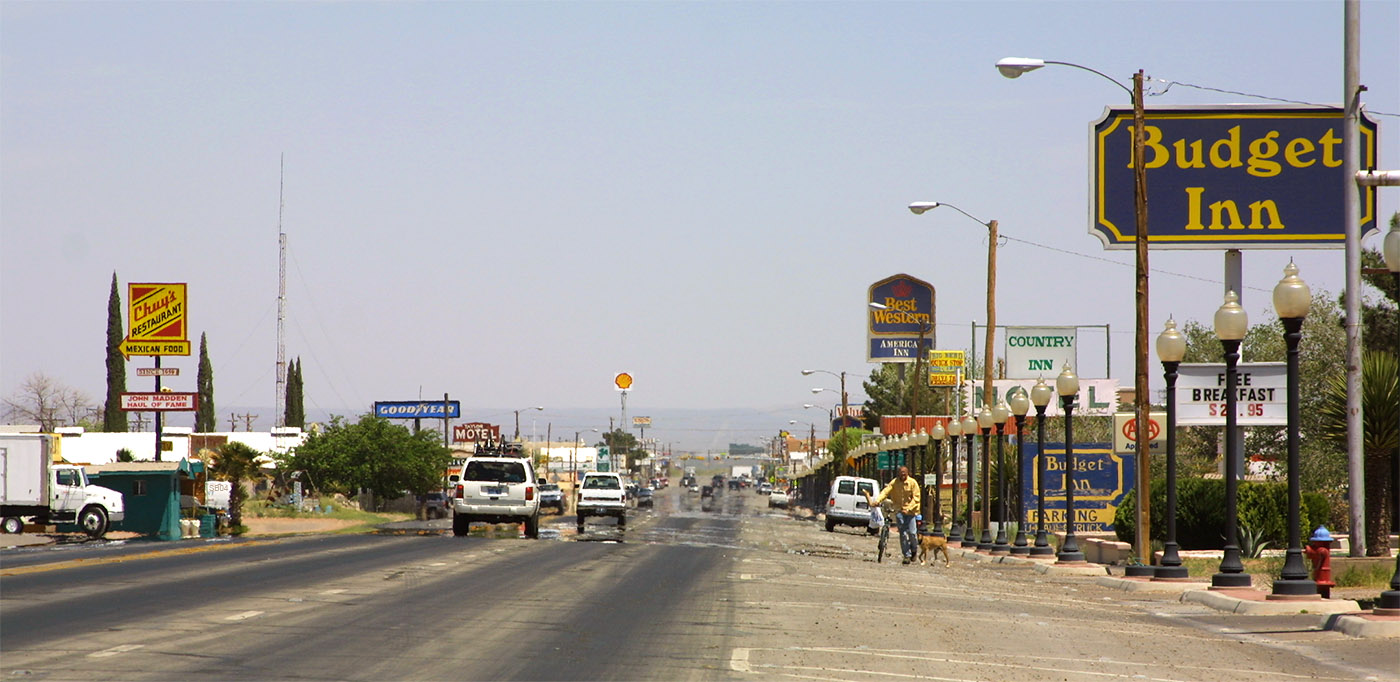
Bus. I-10-D in Van Horn

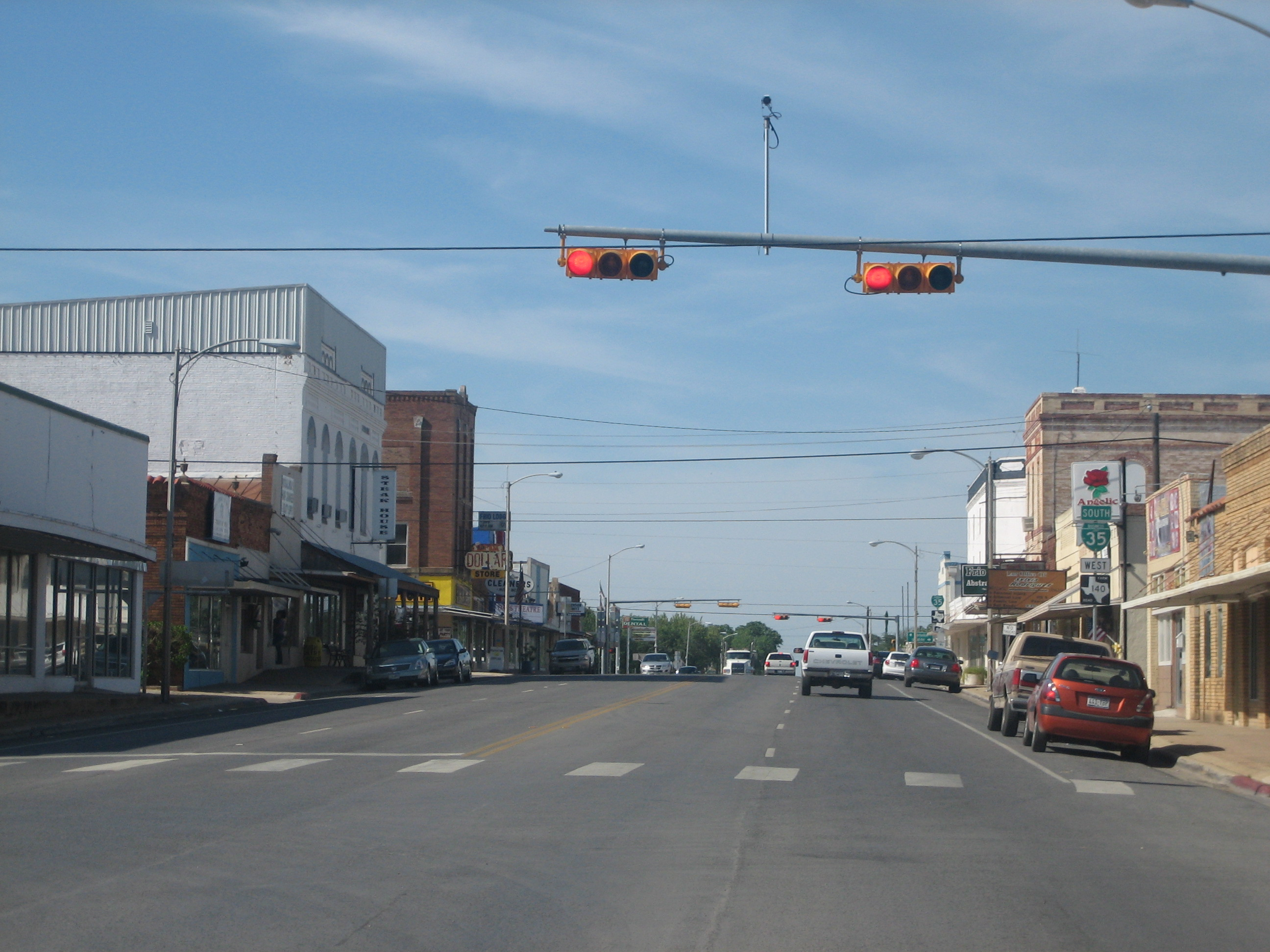
Bus. I-35-E in Pearsall
