= McLean High School (Texas) =

Location
- 4th and Rowe Street; McLean, Texas 79057; United States; 35.236304°N 100.597864°W

Information
- School type: Public high school
- School district: McLean Independent School District
- Principal: Andy Glass
- Staff: 19.31 (on an FTE basis)
- Grades: PK-12
- Enrollment: 189 (2023–24)
- Student to teacher ratio: 9.79
- Colors: Black & Gold
- Athletics conference: UIL Class A
- Mascot: Tiger
- Website: McLean High School

McLean High School or McLean School is a public high school located in the city of McLean, Texas USA and classified as a 1A school by the UIL. It is a part of the McLean Independent School District located in central Gray County. In 2013, the school was rated "Met Standard" by the Texas Education Agency.

== Athletics ==
The McLean Tigers compete in these sports

- Basketball
- Cross Country
- 6-Man Football
- Golf
- Softball
- Tennis
- Track and Field

=== State titles ===
- Boys Track
  - 1968
- Football
  - 2018(1A/D1) Six Man

=== State finalist ===
  - 2019(1A/D1) Six Man

== Theater ==
- One Act Play
  - 1959(1A)
