= McLean, Texas =

- Town
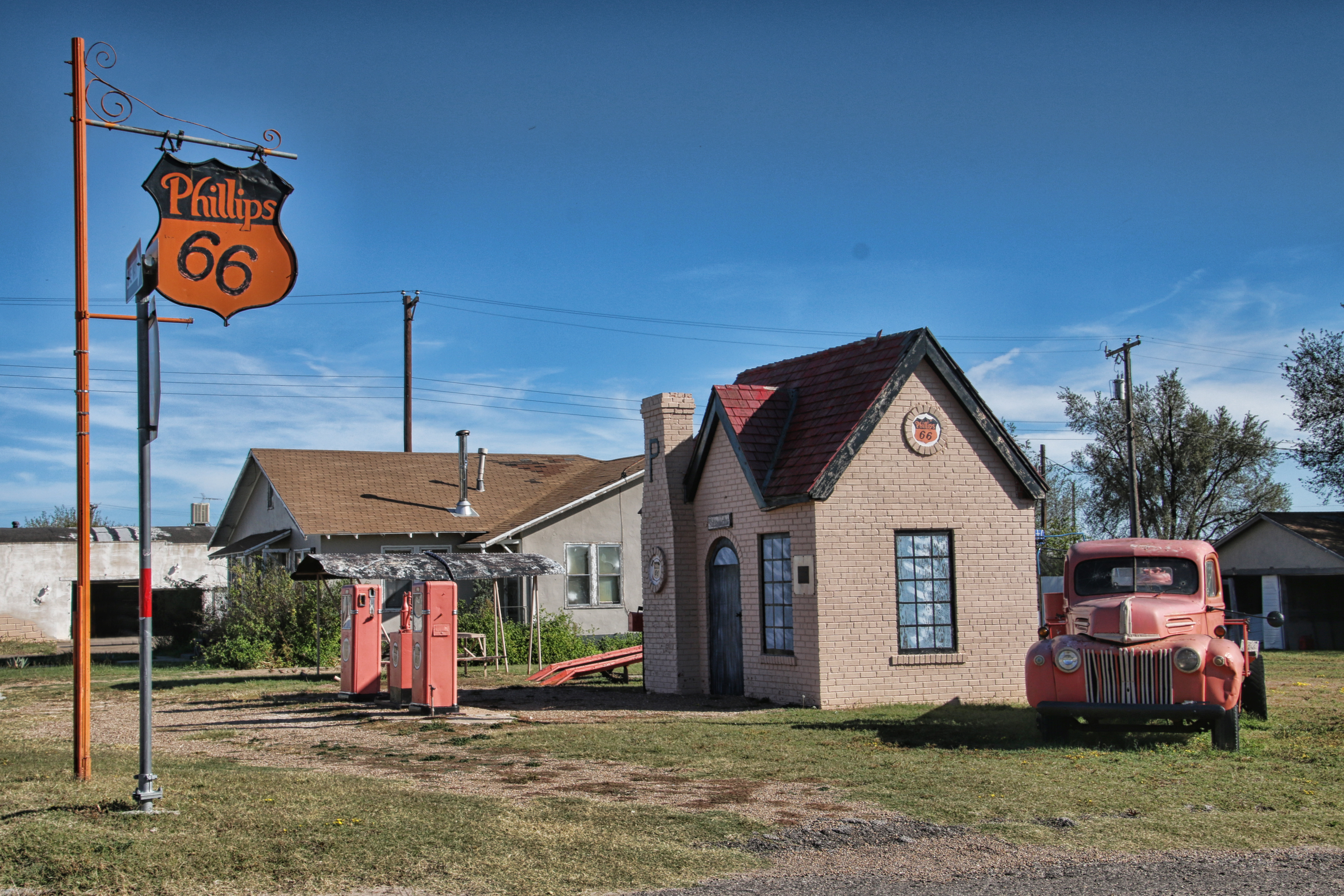

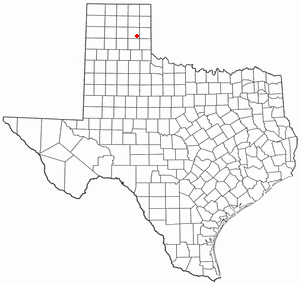
- Location of McLean, Texas

- Coordinates: 35°13′56″N 100°36′0″W
- Country: United States
- State: Texas
- County: Gray

Area
  - Total: 1.16 sq mi (3.00 km^{2})
  - Land: 1.16 sq mi (3.00 km^{2})
  - Water: 0 sq mi (0.00 km^{2})
- Elevation: 2,861 ft (872 m)

Population (2020)
  - Total: 665
  - Density: 574/sq mi (222/km^{2})
- Time zone: UTC-6 (Central (CST))
  - Summer (DST): UTC-5 (CDT)
- ZIP code: 79057
- Area code: 806
- FIPS code: 48-45780
- GNIS feature ID: 2412968
- Website: https://mcleantx.org/

McLean is a town in Gray County, Texas, United States. It is part of the Pampa micropolitan statistical area. Its population was 665 as of the 2020 census.

== Geography ==
McLean is located in southeastern Gray County. Interstate 40 passes through the southern part of the town, leading east 185 miles (298 km) to Oklahoma City and west 74 miles (119 km) to Amarillo. Interstate 40 Business (Old U.S. 66) passes through the town as First Street (westbound) and Railroad Street (eastbound), connecting to I-40 at Exit 141 west of town and Exit 143 to the east. Texas State Highway 273 runs along the western edge of McLean, accessing I-40 at Exit 142 and running north then northwest 35 miles (56 km) to Pampa, the Gray County seat.

According to the United States Census Bureau, McLean has a total area of 1.2 sq mi (3.0 km^{2}), all land.

== History ==
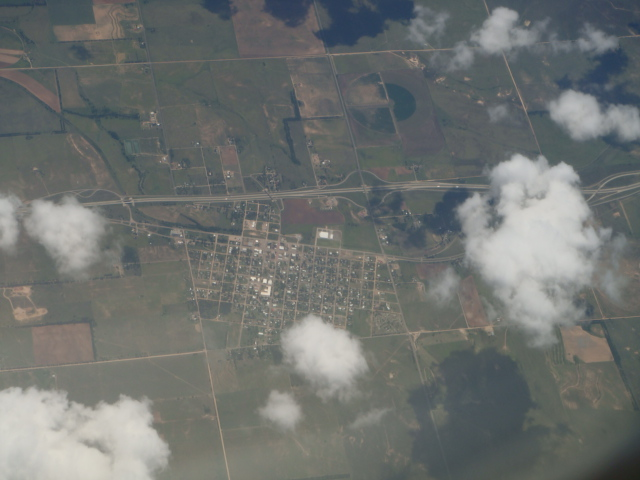
McLean as seen from an airplane, looking south

In 1901, Alfred Rowe, an English rancher who later perished in the sinking of the Titanic, donated land near a railroad cattle-loading stop for the establishment of a town site. The Choctaw, Oklahoma and Texas Railroad Company constructed a water well and a switch and section house there. The town was named for Judge William P. McLean (1836–1925) of the Texas Legislature and Railroad Commission. The town grew rapidly. By 1904, McLean had three general stores, a bank, two wagon yards and livery stables, a lumber yard, and a newspaper, the McLean News. A windmill pumped water from a well drilled in the middle of Main Street, and citizens hauled the water in barrels and buckets. The town was incorporated in 1909, with C. S. Rice as mayor, and became a center for agriculture.

In 1927, the Mother Road, U.S. Route 66, was built through the town, and it became a stop for tourists and a center for oil, livestock, and agriculture processing and shipping. By 1940, the population had risen to 1,500 with six churches, 59 businesses, and a newspaper. In 1942, a prisoner-of-war camp was built east-northeast of the town, and was operated until 1945, housing about 3,000 German prisoners.

As the prominence of other Texas Panhandle cities, especially Amarillo and Pampa, surpassed McLean, the town began to decrease slowly in size. In 1984, the town was bypassed as part of the final phase of construction of Interstate 40, which replaced the old U.S. Route 66 through that area.

== Demographics ==
Historical population
Census	Pop.	Note	%±
1910	633		—
1920	741		17.1%
1930	1,521		105.3%
1940	1,489		−2.1%
1950	1,439		−3.4%
1960	1,330		−7.6%
1970	1,183		−11.1%
1980	1,160		−1.9%
1990	849		−26.8%
2000	830		−2.2%
2010	778		−6.3%
2020	665		−14.5%
U.S. Decennial Census; 2020 Census

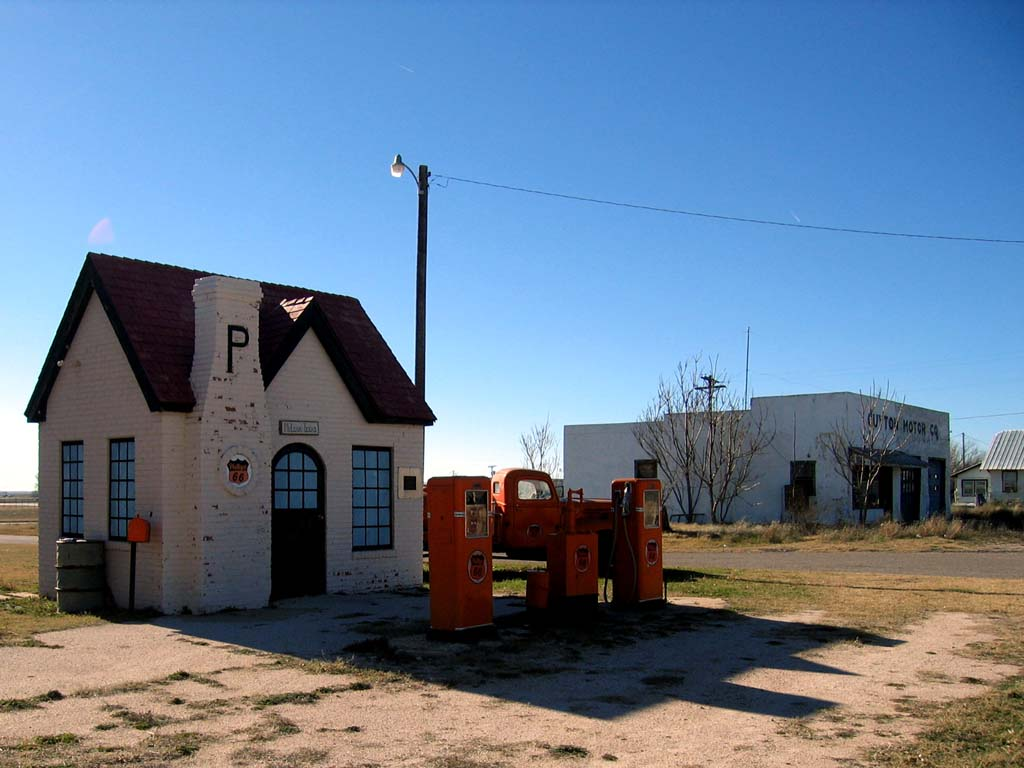
Former Phillips 66 station

As of the census of 2000, 830 people, 343 households, and 186 families were residing in the town. The population density was 706.2 people/sq mi (271.6/km^{2}). The 459 housing units averaged 390.6/sq mi (150.2/km^{2}). The racial makeup of the town was 96.87% White, 0.36% African American, 0.60% Native American, 0.24% Asian, 0.60% from other races, and 1.33% from two or more races. Hispanics or Latinos of any race were 2.17% of the population.

Of the 343 households, 23.3% had children under 18 living with them, 45.5% were married couples living together, 6.7% had a female householder with no husband present, and 45.5% were not families. About 42.6% of all households were made up of individuals, and 25.4% had someone living alone who was 65 or older. The average household size was 2.12, and the average family size was 2.96.

In the town, age distribution was 20.7% under the age of 18, 5.8% from 18 to 24, 17.7% from 25 to 44, 20.1% from 45 to 64, and 35.7% who were 65 or older. The median age was 50 years. For every 100 females, there were 80.4 males. For every 100 females age 18 and over, there were 70.0 males.

The median income for a household in the town was $22,847, and for a family was $34,286. Males had a median income of $26,667 versus $20,000 for females. The per capita income for the town was $13,843. About 12.9% of families and 16.4% of the population were below the poverty line, including 17.9% of those under age 18 and 15.2% of those age 65 or over.

== Education ==
The town is served by the McLean Independent School District and is home to the McLean Tigers.

== Public library ==
The Lovett Memorial Library was established August 9, 1940, in the City Hall of McLean. The city council voted to give $10.00 a month to help finance the new library, and appointed a library board to be the governing body. Mrs. Lady Bryant was hired to open the library from 12:00 noon until 5:00 pm daily (closed on Sundays). Since 1940, the library has seen some changes. The current location of 302 N. Main Street in McLean now houses five public-access computers, Wi-Fi access, fax, copying, printing, movies, audio books, and a selection of large-print, fiction, mystery, Western and nonfiction titles. The library is a member of the Texas Panhandle Library System and the Harrington Library Consortium.

== National Register of Historical Places ==
The McLean Commercial District, consisting of most of the downtown area, was listed in the historical register on December 20, 2006.
