= Texas State Highway 273 =

State highway in Texas

State Highway 273
- SH 273, highlighted in red

Route information
- Maintained by TxDOT
- Length: 61.453 mi (98.899 km)
- Existed: 1938–present

Major junctions
- South end: SH 203 near Hedley
- I-40 at McLean
- North end: US 60 at Pampa

Location
- Country: United States
- State: Texas

Highway system
- Highways in Texas; Interstate; US; State; Former; Toll; Loops; Spurs; FM/RM; Park; Rec
| ← SH 272 | → SH 274 |

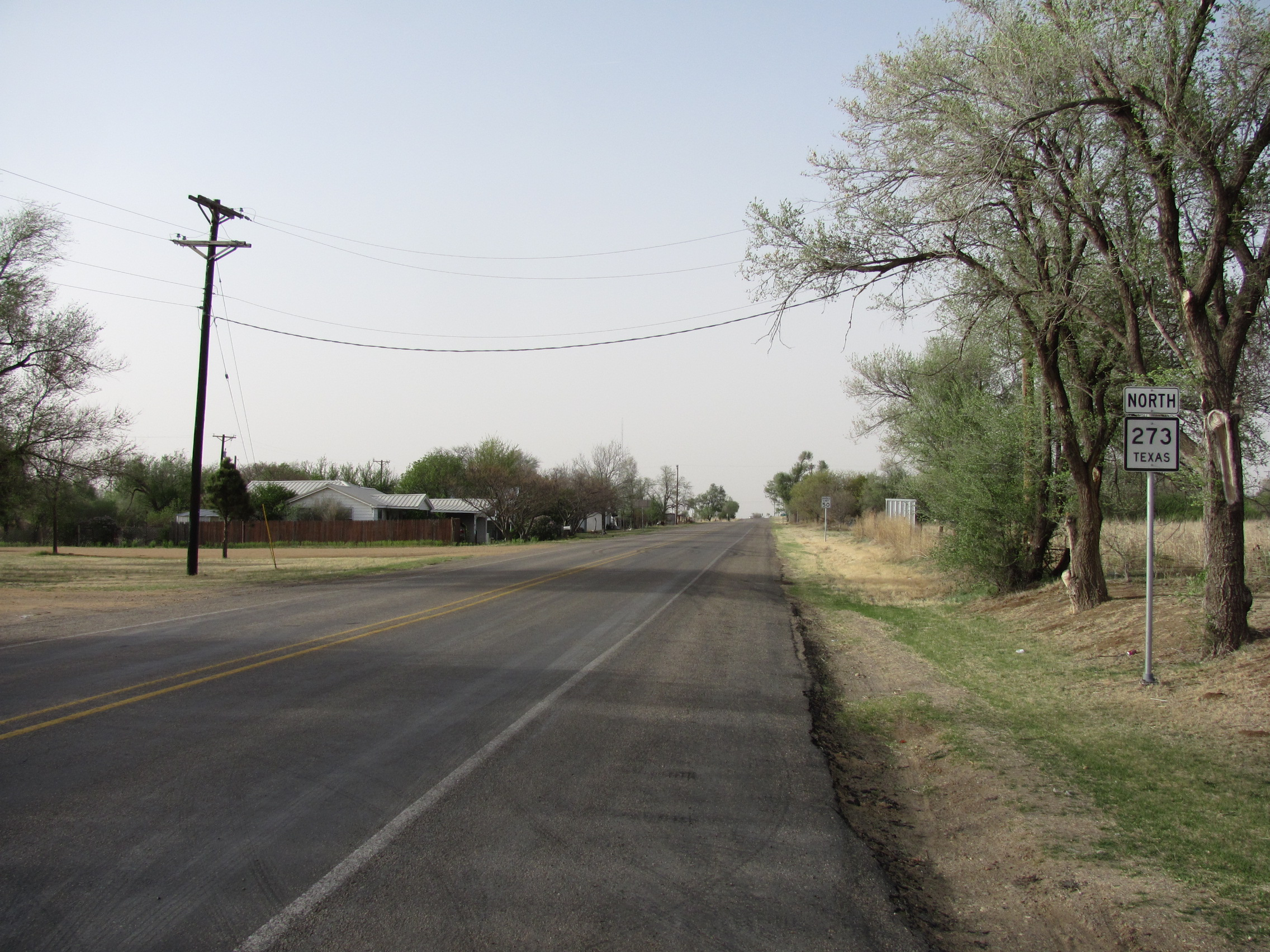
Northbound in McLean, Texas

State Highway 273 (SH 273) is a state highway that runs from Pampa in northern Texas east and south to SH 203 near Hedley.

== History ==
The route was originally designated on July 30, 1938 from Pampa to McLean. On November 4, 1971, an extension along Ranch to Market Road 2695 to US 287 along was signed, but not designated. On August 29, 1990 the current route was completed by redesignating Ranch to Market Road 2695 from McLean to SH 203 as part of SH 273.

== Route description ==
Beginning at a junction with US 60 at Pampa in Gray County, SH 273 runs south to a junction with Loop 171. In Pampa the highway is known as Cuyler Street and Barnes Street. After a brief co-routing with Loop 171, the highway runs southeast to Lefors and then south to a junction with Interstate 40 at McLean, where the route is known as Sitter Street. SH 273 then runs almost directly south to its final junction with SH 203 near Hedley in Donley County. Most of the terrain covered by the highway is lightly populated ranch and oil country.

== Junction list ==
| County | Location | mi | km | Destinations | Notes |
|---|---|---|---|---|---|
| Donley | | | | SH 203 – Hedley, Wellington | |
| Donley | | | | FM 2471 west | |
| Donley | | | | FM 2944 south | |
| Gray | McLean | | | I-40 | I-40 exit 142. |
| Gray | McLean | | | I-40 BL – Amarillo, Shamrock | |
| Gray | | | | RM 1321 east | |
| Gray | | | | FM 2473 east – Kellerville | |
| Gray | | | | FM 291 south – Alanreed | |
| Gray | | | | RM 1321 east | |
| Gray | | | | Spur 398 north – Lefors | |
| Gray | | | | RM 2375 – Lefors | |
| Gray | | | | Spur 398 south – Lefors | |
| Gray | | | | Loop 171 north – Pampa | South end of Loop 171 overlap |
| Gray | | | | Loop 171 south / FM 749 south – Bowers City | North end of Loop 171 overlap |
| Gray | Pampa | | | FM 750 (McCullough Avenue) | |
| Gray | Pampa | | | US 60 (Brown Avenue) – Amarillo, Miami | |
1.000 mi = 1.609 km; 1.000 km = 0.621 mi: Concurrency terminus
