= Quail, Texas =

- Census-designated place
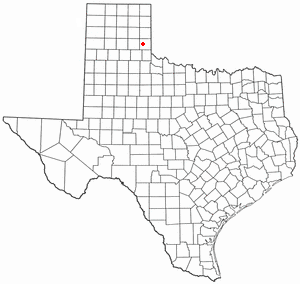
- Location of Quail, Texas

- Coordinates: 34°54′54″N 100°23′30″W
- Country: United States
- State: Texas
- County: Collingsworth

Area
  - Total: 3.2 sq mi (8.2 km^{2})
  - Land: 3.2 sq mi (8.2 km^{2})
  - Water: 0 sq mi (0.0 km^{2})
- Elevation: 2,225 ft (678 m)

Population (2020)
  - Total: 17
  - Density: 5.4/sq mi (2.1/km^{2})
- Time zone: UTC-6 (Central (CST))
  - Summer (DST): UTC-5 (CDT)
- ZIP code: 79251
- Area code: 806
- FIPS code: 48-60020
- GNIS feature ID: 2409112

Quail is a rural small town and census-designated place in Collingsworth County, Texas, United States. The population was 17 at the 2020 census, down from 19 at the 2010 census. The town has a general store, a small hotel and an income tax service.

== Geography ==
Quail is located in west-central Collingsworth County along Texas State Highway 203. It is 14.2 miles (22.9 km) northwest of Wellington, the county seat, and 16 miles (26 km) east of Hedley.

According to the United States Census Bureau, the Quail CDP has a total area of 3.2 square miles (8.2 km^{2}), all land.

== Demographics ==
Historical population
Census	Pop.	Note	%±
2000	33		—
2010	19		−42.4%
2020	17		−10.5%
U.S. Decennial Census; 1850–1900 1910; 1920 1930 1940; 1950 1960 1970; 1980 1990 2000; 2010

Quail first appeared as a census designated place in the 2000 U.S. census.

=== 2020 census ===
Quail CDP, Texas – Racial and ethnic composition Note: the US Census treats Hispanic/Latino as an ethnic category. This table excludes Latinos from the racial categories and assigns them to a separate category. Hispanics/Latinos may be of any race.
Race / Ethnicity (NH = Non-Hispanic)	Pop 2000	Pop 2010	Pop 2020	% 2000	% 2010	% 2020
White alone (NH)	25	18	16	75.76%	94.74%	94.12%
Black or African American alone (NH)	1	0	0	3.03%	0.00%	0.00%
Native American or Alaska Native alone (NH)	7	1	0	21.21%	5.26%	0.00%
Asian alone (NH)	0	0	0	0.00%	0.00%	0.00%
Native Hawaiian or Pacific Islander alone (NH)	0	0	0	0.00%	0.00%	0.00%
Other race alone (NH)	0	0	0	0.00%	0.00%	0.00%
Mixed race or Multiracial (NH)	0	0	0	0.00%	0.00%	0.00%
Hispanic or Latino (any race)	0	0	1	0.00%	0.00%	5.88%
Total	33	19	17	100.00%	100.00%	100.00%

=== 2000 census ===
As of the census of 2000, there were 33 people, 11 households, and 9 families residing in the CDP. The population density was 10.4 people per square mile (4.0/km^{2}). There were 16 housing units at an average density of 5.0/sq mi (1.9/km^{2}). The racial makeup of the CDP was 75.76% White, 3.03% African American and 21.21% Native American.

There were 11 households, out of which 36.4% had children under the age of 18 living with them, 90.9% were married couples living together, and 9.1% were non-families. 9.1% of all households were made up of individuals, and 9.1% had someone living alone who was 65 years of age or older. The average household size was 3.00 and the average family size was 3.10.

In the CDP, the population was spread out, with 24.2% under the age of 18, 12.1% from 18 to 24, 21.2% from 25 to 44, 21.2% from 45 to 64, and 21.2% who were 65 years of age or older. The median age was 38 years. For every 100 females, there were 175.0 males. For every 100 females age 18 and over, there were 150.0 males.

The median income for a household in the CDP was $19,464, and the median income for a family was $19,464. Males had a median income of $30,000 versus $26,250 for females. The per capita income for the CDP was $13,456. None of the population or families were below the poverty line.

== Education ==
Quail is served by the Hedley Independent School District.
