= Hedley Independent School District =

School district in Texas, United States

Coordinates: 34.8691°N 100.6571°W

Hedley School

Location
- 3rd & Jones; Hedley, Texas 79237-0069; United States

Information
- School type: Public K-12 school
- Motto: Hedley - Heading for Success
- School district: Hedley Independent School District
- Principal: Eric Alston
- Staff: 16.84 (FTE)
- Grades: PK-12
- Enrollment: 111 (2017-18)
- Student to teacher ratio: 6.59
- Colors: Green & White
- Athletics conference: UIL Class A
- Mascot: Owl
- Website: www.hedleyisd.net

Hedley Independent School District is a public school district based in Hedley, Texas, USA. Located in southeast Donley County, a portion of the district extends into Collingsworth County. In addition to Hedley, the district also serves the community of Quail. Hedley ISD has one school, Hedley School that serves students in grades pre-kindergarten through twelve.

In 2009, the school district was rated "recognized" by the Texas Education Agency.

In 2013, the school was rated "Met Standard" by the Texas Education Agency.

== Athletics ==
The Hedley Owls compete in the following sports

Cross Country, 6-Man Football, Basketball, Golf, Tennis, Track, Powerlifting

== Faculty ==
- Don Haskins: His second basketball head coaching job was at Hedley from 1956 to 1960. In 1959 his team advanced to the state tournament. He became the men's basketball head coach at Texas Western College (renamed the University of Texas at El Paso in 1967) from 1961 to 1999, including the 1966 season when his team won the NCAA Tournament.
