= Texas State Highway 203 =

Highway in Texas

State Highway 203
- SH 203, highlighted in red

Route information
- Maintained by TxDOT
- Length: 39.837 mi (64.111 km)
- Existed: by 1934–present

Major junctions
- West end: US 287 in Hedley
- FM 1547 at Quail; US 83 in Wellington
- East end: SH-9 towards Mangum, OK

Location
- Country: United States
- State: Texas

Highway system
- Highways in Texas; Interstate; US; State; Former; Toll; Loops; Spurs; FM/RM; Park; Rec
| ← SH 202 | → SH 204 |

State Highway 203 is a nearly 40-mile (64 km) state highway in the U.S. state of Texas. It runs through the Texas panhandle from Hedley to the Oklahoma state line.

== History ==
SH 203 was added to the state highway system by 1919, as part of SH 13; the former alignment of SH 13 via Wheeler became SH 33 and is now SH 152. By 1926, SH 13 had taken the alignment that became US 66, while the route through Wellington became SH 52. On March 13, 1934, the part of SH 52 east of Wellington remained, but the highway west of Wellington was renumbered SH 203, along with a proposed route from Wellington to the state line near Dodson. On June 23, 1945, the state designated the route via Dodson as part of Farm to Market Road 338, causing this section of SH 203 to conflict in designation. SH 203 was rerouted on September 26, 1945 to absorb the rest of SH 52, as the old route was already part of FM 338. There have been no changes to the routing of SH 203 since 1945.

== Route description ==
SH 203 heads northeastward from Hedley. It meets the beginning of SH 273 after leaving that town. SH 203 then turns more easterly and passes through Quail. North of Wellington, it overlaps US 83. It then ends at the Oklahoma state line, where it becomes Oklahoma State Highway 9.

== Junction list ==
| County | Location | mi | km | Destinations | Notes |
|---|---|---|---|---|---|
| Donley | Hedley | 0.0 | 0.0 | US 287 | Western terminus |
| Donley | Hedley | 0.1 | 0.16 | FM 1932 | Southern terminus of FM 1932 |
| Donley | | 2.0 | 3.2 | SH 273 | Southern terminus of SH 273 |
| Donley | | 6.6 | 10.6 | FM 2944 | Southern terminus of FM 2944 |
| Collingsworth | Quail | 16.1 | 25.9 | FM 1547 | |
| Collingsworth | | 21.4 | 34.4 | FM 2344 | Southern terminus of FM 2344 |
| Collingsworth | | 26.4 | 42.5 | FM 1035 | Northern terminus of FM 1035 |
| Collingsworth | | 27.4 | 44.1 | US 83 | Western end of US 83 concurrency |
| Collingsworth | Wellington | 29.3 | 47.2 | US 83 / FM 3197 | Eastern terminus of FM 3197, Western end of US 83 concurrency |
| Collingsworth | | 30.3 | 48.8 | FM 398 | Northern terminus of FM 398 |
| Collingsworth | | 32.3 | 52.0 | FM 2734 | Southern terminus of FM 2734 |
| Collingsworth | | 39.8 | 64.1 | SH-9 | Oklahoma state line; eastern terminus |
1.000 mi = 1.609 km; 1.000 km = 0.621 mi: Concurrency terminus
