= Dozier, Texas =

- Unincorporated community
- Location within Texas Location within the United States
- Coordinates: 35°04′52″N 100°20′38″W
- Country: United States
- State: Texas
- County: Collingsworth
- Elevation: 2,261 ft (689 m)
- Time zone: UTC-6 (Central (CST))
  - Summer (DST): UTC-5 (CDT)
- Area code: 806
- GNIS feature ID: 1356235

Dozier is an unincorporated community in Collingsworth County, in the U.S. state of Texas. According to the Handbook of Texas, the community had a population of 30 in 2000.

== History ==
The community had a population of four in 2010 through 2019.

== Geography ==
Dozier is located at the intersection of Farm to Market Roads 1036 and 1547 near Dozier Creek on the Salt Fork Red River, 10 mi (16 km) south of Lela in northwestern Collingsworth County.

== Education ==
Today, the community is served by the Wellington Independent School District.
