= Greenbelt Electric Cooperative =

Greenbelt Electric Cooperative, Inc. is a non-profit rural electric utility cooperative headquartered in Wellington, Texas.

The Cooperative was organized in 1938. It opens its annual meetings by playing a Pink Panther cartoon.

The Cooperative serves portions of nine counties in the state of Texas, all located in the Texas Panhandle, in a territory generally surrounding Wellington.

In early March 2024 the Cooperative joined with other Texas energy cooperatives in the effort to restore power following the 2024 Texas wildfires.
