= 1916 United States presidential election in Texas =

- November 7, 1916

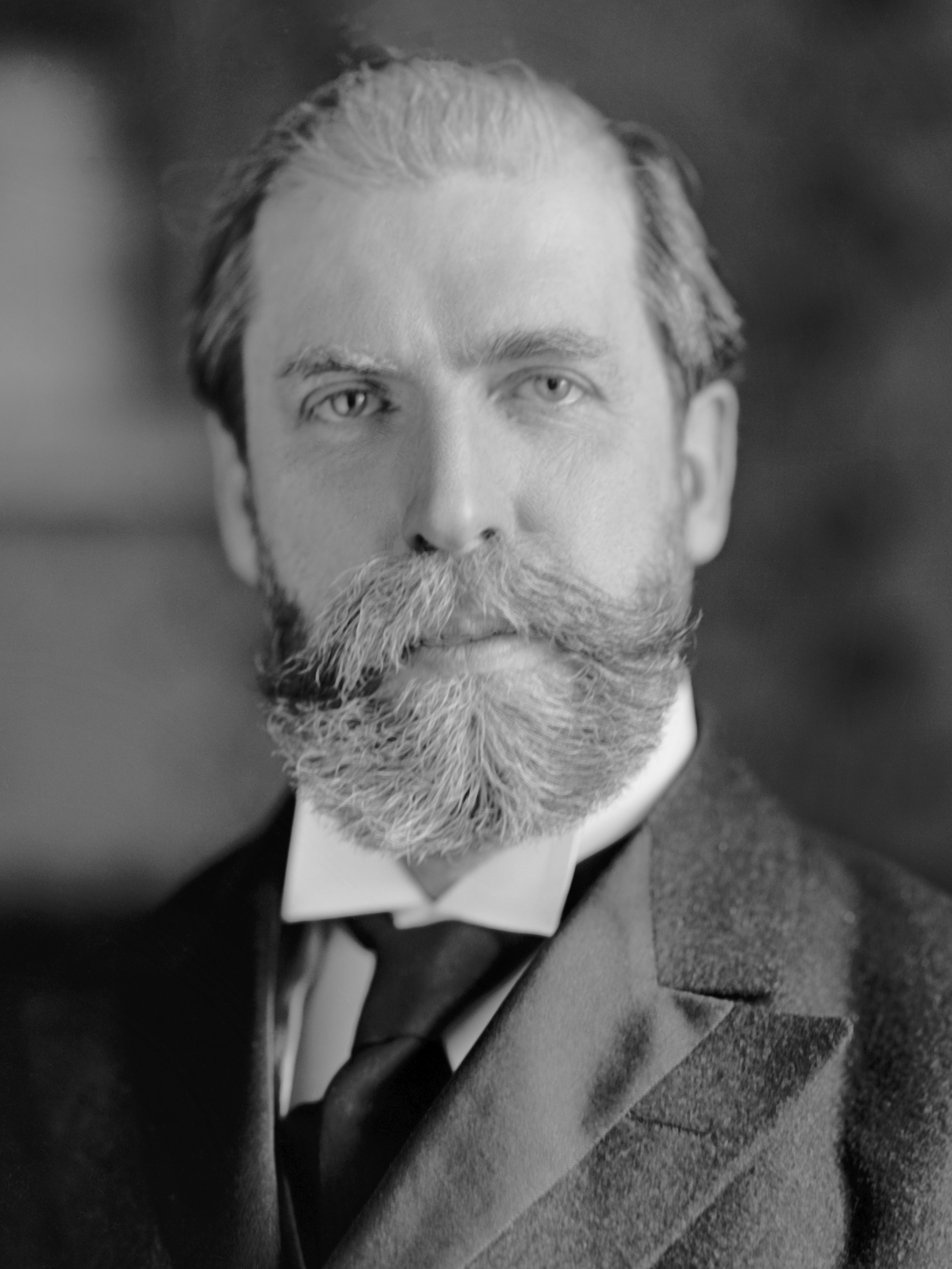

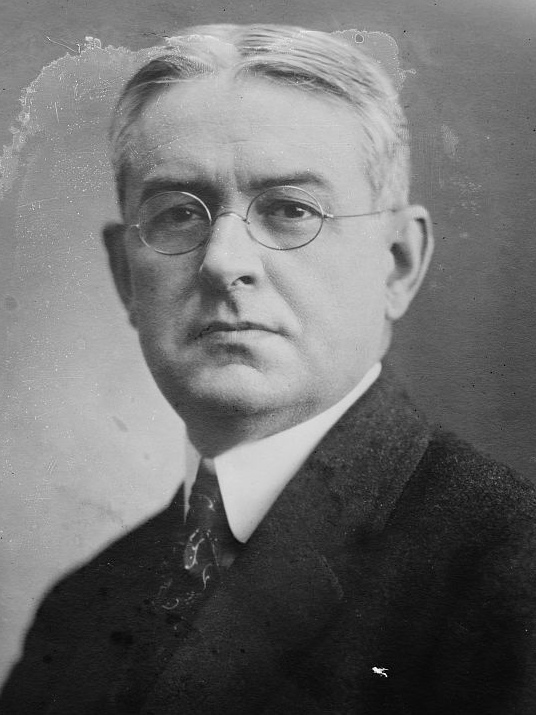
Nominee	Woodrow Wilson	Charles Evans Hughes	Allan L. Benson
Party	Democratic	Republican	Socialist
Home state	New Jersey	New York	New York
Running mate	Thomas R. Marshall	Charles W. Fairbanks	George Ross Kirkpatrick
Electoral vote	20	0	0
Popular vote	286,514	64,999	18,963
Percentage	76.92%	17.45%	5.09%
County results
Wilson
40–50%
50–60%
60–70%
70–80%
80–90%
90–100%
Hughes
40–50%
50–60%
60–70%
70–80%
80–90%
President before election
Woodrow Wilson
Democratic
Elected President
Woodrow Wilson
Democratic

The 1916 United States presidential election in Texas took place on November 7, 1916. All contemporary forty-eight states were part of the 1916 United States presidential election. State voters chose 20 electors to the Electoral College, who voted for president and vice president.

Texas was overwhelmingly won by incumbent president Woodrow Wilson. Wilson defeated Charles Evans Hughes by a landslide margin of 59.47 percent. With 76.92 percent of the popular vote, Texas would prove to be Wilson's fifth strongest in terms of popular vote percentage after South Carolina, Mississippi, Louisiana and Georgia.

== Results ==
1916 United States presidential election in Texas
Party	Candidate	Votes	Percentage	Electoral votes
Democratic	Woodrow Wilson (incumbent)	286,514	76.92%	20
Republican	Charles Evans Hughes	64,999	17.45%	0
Socialist	Allan L. Benson	18,963	5.09%	0
Prohibition	Frank Hanly	1,985	0.53%	0
Totals		372,461	100.00%	20

=== Results by county ===
1916 United States presidential election in Texas by county
County	Woodrow Wilson Democratic		Charles Evans Hughes Republican		Allan L. Benson Socialist		Frank Hanly Prohibition		Margin		Total votes cast
County	#	%	#	%	#	%	#	%	#	%	Total votes cast
Anderson	1,984	74.11%	501	18.71%	187	6.99%	5	0.19%	1,483	55.40%	2,677
Andrews	71	95.95%	0	0.00%	3	4.05%	0	0.00%	68 (Note: In this county where Benson ran second ahead of Hughes, margin given is Wilson vote minus Benson vote and percentage margin Wilson percentage minus Benson percentage.)	91.89%	74
Angelina	1,344	76.54%	75	4.27%	335	19.08%	2	0.11%	1,009	57.46%	1,756
Aransas	179	84.83%	24	11.37%	6	2.84%	2	0.95%	155	73.46%	211
Archer	527	78.54%	104	15.50%	34	5.07%	6	0.89%	423	63.04%	671
Armstrong	353	86.73%	43	10.57%	6	1.47%	5	1.23%	310	76.17%	407
Atascosa	635	78.40%	119	14.69%	44	5.43%	12	1.48%	516	63.70%	810
Austin	960	58.43%	673	40.96%	10	0.61%	0	0.00%	287	17.47%	1,643
Bandera	537	71.41%	168	22.34%	44	5.85%	3	0.40%	369	49.07%	752
Bastrop	1,335	69.93%	550	28.81%	21	1.10%	3	0.16%	785	41.12%	1,909
Baylor	711	85.05%	47	5.62%	74	8.85%	4	0.48%	637	76.20%	836
Bee	584	76.14%	152	19.82%	29	3.78%	2	0.26%	432	56.32%	767
Bell	3,615	86.75%	356	8.54%	162	3.89%	34	0.82%	3,259	78.21%	4,167
Bexar	7,008	55.12%	5,483	43.13%	187	1.47%	36	0.28%	1,525	11.99%	12,714
Blanco	628	70.96%	235	26.55%	19	2.15%	3	0.34%	393	44.41%	885
Borden	84	92.31%	1	1.10%	3	3.30%	3	3.30%	81	89.01%	91
Bosque	1,561	85.91%	179	9.85%	73	4.02%	4	0.22%	1,382	76.06%	1,817
Bowie	1,941	73.69%	414	15.72%	273	10.36%	6	0.23%	1,527	57.97%	2,634
Brazoria	1,033	59.78%	581	33.62%	80	4.63%	34	1.97%	452	26.16%	1,728
Brazos	1,027	78.52%	273	20.87%	3	0.23%	5	0.38%	754	57.65%	1,308
Brewster	207	80.23%	43	16.67%	7	2.71%	1	0.39%	164	63.57%	258
Briscoe	260	90.91%	4	1.40%	22	7.69%	0	0.00%	238	83.22%	286
Brooks	101	60.48%	63	37.72%	1	0.60%	2	1.20%	38	22.75%	167
Brown	1,986	87.22%	181	7.95%	104	4.57%	6	0.26%	1,805	79.27%	2,277
Burleson	1,208	80.80%	262	17.53%	23	1.54%	2	0.13%	946	63.28%	1,495
Burnet	913	86.29%	115	10.87%	23	2.17%	7	0.66%	798	75.43%	1,058
Caldwell	1,216	83.40%	225	15.43%	15	1.03%	2	0.14%	991	67.97%	1,458
Calhoun	388	71.32%	84	15.44%	64	11.76%	8	1.47%	304	55.88%	544
Callahan	959	85.55%	74	6.60%	83	7.40%	5	0.45%	876	78.14%	1,121
Cameron	1,260	73.43%	420	24.48%	25	1.46%	11	0.64%	840	48.95%	1,716
Camp	721	74.79%	206	21.37%	35	3.63%	2	0.21%	515	53.42%	964
Carson	326	78.74%	78	18.84%	7	1.69%	3	0.72%	248	59.90%	414
Cass	1,505	64.43%	707	30.27%	124	5.31%	0	0.00%	798	34.16%	2,336
Castro	176	69.84%	69	27.38%	5	1.98%	2	0.79%	107	42.46%	252
Chambers	239	61.92%	101	26.17%	43	11.14%	3	0.78%	138	35.75%	386
Cherokee	2,002	80.34%	241	9.67%	245	9.83%	4	0.16%	1,757	70.51%	2,492
Childress	948	89.52%	31	2.93%	77	7.27%	3	0.28%	871	82.25%	1,059
Clay	1,324	84.87%	177	11.35%	54	3.46%	5	0.32%	1,147	73.53%	1,560
Coke	484	86.74%	29	5.20%	42	7.53%	3	0.54%	442	79.21%	558
Coleman	1,700	85.86%	96	4.85%	182	9.19%	2	0.10%	1,518	76.67%	1,980
Collin	4,141	83.94%	594	12.04%	190	3.85%	8	0.16%	3,547	71.90%	4,933
Collingsworth	589	86.62%	31	4.56%	54	7.94%	6	0.88%	535	78.68%	680
Colorado	1,041	70.29%	358	24.17%	76	5.13%	6	0.41%	683	46.12%	1,481
Comal	432	35.61%	743	61.25%	38	3.13%	0	0.00%	-311	-25.64%	1,213
Comanche	1,494	76.38%	148	7.57%	301	15.39%	13	0.66%	1,193	60.99%	1,956
Concho	418	82.12%	36	7.07%	53	10.41%	2	0.39%	365	71.71%	509
Cooke	2,273	83.11%	353	12.91%	106	3.88%	3	0.11%	1,920	70.20%	2,735
Coryell	1,802	87.26%	188	9.10%	72	3.49%	3	0.15%	1,614	78.16%	2,065
Cottle	455	85.05%	12	2.24%	67	12.52%	1	0.19%	388	72.52%	535
Crockett	65	75.58%	16	18.60%	5	5.81%	0	0.00%	49	56.98%	86
Crosby	456	85.55%	31	5.82%	46	8.63%	0	0.00%	410	76.92%	533
Culberson	124	97.64%	2	1.57%	1	0.79%	0	0.00%	122	96.06%	127
Dallam	363	74.08%	81	16.53%	39	7.96%	7	1.43%	282	57.55%	490
Dallas	13,410	82.51%	2,554	15.71%	184	1.13%	105	0.65%	10,856	66.79%	16,253
Dawson	288	90.57%	14	4.40%	14	4.40%	2	0.63%	274	86.16%	318
Deaf Smith	356	78.76%	77	17.04%	16	3.54%	3	0.66%	279	61.73%	452
Delta	1,254	86.48%	72	4.97%	115	7.93%	9	0.62%	1,139	78.55%	1,450
Denton	2,844	82.15%	451	13.03%	157	4.53%	10	0.29%	2,393	69.12%	3,462
De Witt	1,056	49.18%	1,068	49.74%	21	0.98%	2	0.09%	-12	-0.56%	2,147
Dickens	389	87.81%	15	3.39%	39	8.80%	0	0.00%	350	79.01%	443
Dimmit	193	72.01%	74	27.61%	0	0.00%	1	0.37%	119	44.40%	268
Donley	636	85.14%	42	5.62%	54	7.23%	15	2.01%	582	77.91%	747
Duval	597	93.72%	37	5.81%	3	0.47%	0	0.00%	560	87.91%	637
Eastland	1,486	76.64%	146	7.53%	294	15.16%	13	0.67%	1,192	61.47%	1,939
Ector	120	98.36%	2	1.64%	0	0.00%	0	0.00%	118	96.72%	122
Edwards	299	79.10%	73	19.31%	5	1.32%	1	0.26%	226	59.79%	378
Ellis	4,718	92.02%	324	6.32%	74	1.44%	11	0.21%	4,394	85.70%	5.127
El Paso	3,603	65.29%	1,770	32.08%	111	2.01%	34	0.62%	1,833	33.22%	5,518
Erath	2,024	80.57%	184	7.32%	287	11.43%	17	0.68%	1,737	69.15%	2,512
Falls	2,037	67.56%	729	24.18%	232	7.69%	17	0.56%	1,308	43.38%	3,015
Fannin	3,493	82.99%	471	11.19%	236	5.61%	9	0.21%	3,022	71.80%	4,209
Fayette	1,902	60.19%	1,212	38.35%	40	1.27%	6	0.19%	690	21.84%	3,160
Fisher	950	77.17%	46	3.74%	229	18.60%	6	0.49%	721	58.57%	1,231
Floyd	600	81.86%	48	6.55%	78	10.64%	7	0.95%	522	71.21%	733
Foard	475	78.64%	41	6.79%	88	14.57%	0	0.00%	387	64.07%	604
Fort Bend	788	69.12%	329	28.86%	16	1.40%	7	0.61%	459	40.26%	1,140
Franklin	684	86.80%	62	7.87%	42	5.33%	0	0.00%	622	78.93%	788
Freestone	1,575	68.15%	637	27.56%	98	4.24%	1	0.04%	938	40.59%	2,311
Frio	410	87.05%	55	11.68%	4	0.85%	2	0.42%	355	75.37%	471
Gaines	80	95.24%	0	0.00%	4	4.76%	0	0.00%	76	90.48%	84
Galveston	3,543	71.94%	1,263	25.64%	73	1.48%	46	0.93%	2,280	46.29%	4,925
Garza	330	92.18%	14	3.91%	14	3.91%	0	0.00%	316	88.27%	358
Gillespie	405	21.52%	1,463	77.74%	12	0.64%	2	0.11%	-1,058	-56.22%	1,882
Glasscock	96	88.89%	8	7.41%	4	3.70%	0	0.00%	88	81.48%	108
Goliad	605	49.71%	548	45.03%	59	4.85%	5	0.41%	57	4.68%	1,217
Gonzales	1,675	70.35%	649	27.26%	51	2.14%	6	0.25%	1,026	43.09%	2,381
Gray	482	81.97%	69	11.73%	35	5.95%	2	0.34%	413	70.24%	588
Grayson	5,092	79.30%	1,024	15.95%	285	4.44%	20	0.31%	4,068	63.35%	6,421
Gregg	820	81.51%	159	15.81%	25	2.49%	2	0.20%	661	65.71%	1,006
Grimes	1,108	89.14%	108	8.69%	25	2.01%	2	0.16%	1,000	80.45%	1,243
Guadalupe	830	31.32%	1,812	68.38%	7	0.26%	1	0.04%	-982	-37.06%	2,650
Hale	908	87.48%	80	7.71%	43	4.14%	7	0.67%	828	79.77%	1,038
Hall	925	86.61%	49	4.59%	88	8.24%	6	0.56%	837	78.37%	1,068
Hamilton	1,231	84.26%	201	13.76%	28	1.92%	1	0.07%	1,030	70.50%	1,461
Hansford	166	70.34%	47	19.92%	14	5.93%	9	3.81%	119	50.42%	236
Hardeman	932	80.69%	94	8.14%	123	10.65%	6	0.52%	809	70.04%	1,155
Hardin	1,279	83.38%	158	10.30%	90	5.87%	7	0.46%	1,121	73.08%	1,534
Harris	10,131	74.24%	3,009	22.05%	433	3.17%	74	0.54%	7,122	52.19%	13,647
Harrison	1,374	85.02%	172	10.64%	60	3.71%	10	0.62%	1,202	74.38%	1,616
Hartley	161	83.42%	30	15.54%	1	0.52%	1	0.52%	131	67.88%	193
Haskell	1,200	72.03%	95	5.70%	369	22.15%	2	0.12%	831	49.88%	1,666
Hays	995	87.82%	123	10.86%	10	0.88%	5	0.44%	872	76.96%	1,133
Hemphill	496	73.48%	141	20.89%	25	3.70%	13	1.93%	355	52.59%	675
Henderson	1,790	74.18%	268	11.11%	354	14.67%	1	0.04%	1,436	59.51%	2,413
Hidalgo	1,364	82.32%	260	15.69%	26	1.57%	7	0.42%	1,104	66.63%	1,657
Hill	3,951	89.07%	382	8.61%	86	1.94%	17	0.38%	3,569	80.46%	4,436
Hood	693	82.30%	64	7.60%	84	9.98%	1	0.12%	609	72.33%	842
Hopkins	2,568	84.72%	218	7.19%	231	7.62%	14	0.46%	2,337	77.10%	3,031
Houston	1,730	76.38%	373	16.47%	162	7.15%	0	0.00%	1,357	59.91%	2,265
Howard	747	85.18%	30	3.42%	99	11.29%	1	0.11%	648	73.89%	877
Hunt	4,242	87.68%	424	8.76%	155	3.20%	17	0.35%	3,818	78.92%	4,838
Hutchinson	114	75.50%	28	18.54%	6	3.97%	3	1.99%	86	56.95%	151
Irion	150	90.36%	5	3.01%	11	6.63%	0	0.00%	139	83.73%	166
Jack	862	78.22%	121	10.98%	115	10.44%	4	0.36%	741	67.24%	1,102
Jackson	403	67.85%	123	20.71%	63	10.61%	5	0.84%	280	47.14%	594
Jasper	906	88.30%	75	7.31%	41	4.00%	4	0.39%	831	80.99%	1,026
Jeff Davis	234	75.24%	74	23.79%	1	0.32%	2	0.64%	160	51.45%	311
Jefferson	3,082	82.06%	488	12.99%	155	4.13%	31	0.83%	2,594	69.06%	3,756
Jim Hogg	187	94.44%	11	5.56%	0	0.00%	0	0.00%	176	88.89%	198
Jim Wells	335	70.68%	100	21.10%	35	7.38%	4	0.84%	235	49.58%	474
Johnson	3,040	86.93%	275	7.86%	170	4.86%	12	0.34%	2,765	79.07%	3,497
Jones	1,798	84.18%	114	5.34%	214	10.02%	10	0.47%	1,584	74.16%	2,136
Karnes	889	78.26%	238	20.95%	5	0.44%	4	0.35%	651	57.31%	1,136
Kaufman	2,780	82.25%	427	12.63%	172	5.09%	1	0.03%	2,353	69.62%	3,380
Kendall	232	27.92%	590	71.00%	5	0.60%	4	0.48%	-358	-43.08%	831
Kent	212	88.70%	2	0.84%	25	10.46%	0	0.00%	187	78.24%	239
Kerr	621	66.99%	272	29.34%	30	3.24%	4	0.43%	349	37.65%	927
Kimble	223	89.56%	13	5.22%	13	5.22%	0	0.00%	210	84.34%	249
King	47	94.00%	3	6.00%	0	0.00%	0	0.00%	44	88.00%	50
Kinney	233	52.71%	201	45.48%	7	1.58%	1	0.23%	32	7.24%	442
Kleberg	427	73.88%	106	18.34%	44	7.61%	1	0.17%	321	55.54%	578
Knox	884	83.79%	64	6.07%	105	9.95%	2	0.19%	779	73.84%	1,055
Lamar	3,412	89.23%	309	8.08%	96	2.51%	7	0.18%	3,103	81.15%	3,824
Lamb	150	87.21%	14	8.14%	4	2.33%	4	2.33%	136	79.07%	172
Lampasas	848	85.23%	113	11.36%	31	3.12%	3	0.30%	735	73.87%	995
La Salle	340	88.54%	40	10.42%	3	0.78%	1	0.26%	300	78.13%	384
Lavaca	1,784	60.13%	936	31.55%	241	8.12%	6	0.20%	848	28.58%	2,967
Lee	571	38.32%	836	56.11%	82	5.50%	1	0.07%	-265	-17.79%	1,490
Leon	979	66.33%	335	22.70%	162	10.98%	0	0.00%	644	43.63%	1,476
Liberty	704	68.68%	235	22.93%	82	8.00%	4	0.39%	469	45.76%	1,025
Limestone	2,188	86.62%	225	8.91%	107	4.24%	6	0.24%	1,963	77.71%	2,526
Lipscomb	350	66.92%	116	22.18%	47	8.99%	10	1.91%	234	44.74%	523
Live Oak	397	69.16%	119	20.73%	51	8.89%	7	1.22%	278	48.43%	574
Llano	716	88.07%	72	8.86%	23	2.83%	2	0.25%	644	79.21%	813
Lubbock	633	90.69%	34	4.87%	27	3.87%	4	0.57%	599	85.82%	698
Lynn	331	93.50%	15	4.24%	8	2.26%	0	0.00%	316	89.27%	354
McCulloch	847	82.63%	61	5.95%	117	11.41%	0	0.00%	730	71.22%	1,025
McLennan	4,979	82.26%	940	15.53%	122	2.02%	12	0.20%	4,039	66.73%	6,053
McMullen	115	79.86%	29	20.14%	0	0.00%	0	0.00%	86	59.72%	144
Madison	730	81.38%	120	13.38%	41	4.57%	6	0.67%	610	68.00%	897
Marion	445	72.48%	166	27.04%	1	0.16%	2	0.33%	279	45.44%	614
Martin	125	77.64%	14	8.70%	22	13.66%	0	0.00%	103	63.98%	161
Mason	386	67.13%	157	27.30%	32	5.57%	0	0.00%	229	39.83%	575
Matagorda	748	68.56%	252	23.10%	79	7.24%	12	1.10%	496	45.46%	1,091
Maverick	192	43.54%	246	55.78%	2	0.45%	1	0.23%	-54	-12.24%	441
Medina	758	52.60%	650	45.11%	26	1.80%	7	0.49%	108	7.49%	1,441
Menard	267	77.84%	44	12.83%	32	9.33%	0	0.00%	223	65.01%	343
Midland	339	91.37%	24	6.47%	7	1.89%	1	0.27%	315	84.91%	371
Milam	2,198	73.07%	576	19.15%	230	7.65%	4	0.13%	1,622	53.92%	3,008
Mills	640	72.89%	129	14.69%	106	12.07%	3	0.34%	511	58.20%	878
Mitchell	803	87.00%	39	4.23%	80	8.67%	1	0.11%	723	78.33%	923
Montague	1,803	78.56%	245	10.68%	242	10.54%	5	0.22%	1,558	67.89%	2,295
Montgomery	880	72.07%	197	16.13%	141	11.55%	3	0.25%	683	55.94%	1,221
Moore	103	94.50%	6	5.50%	0	0.00%	0	0.00%	97	88.99%	109
Morris	689	64.57%	163	15.28%	52	4.87%	163	15.28%	526	49.30%	1,067
Motley	393	91.40%	9	2.09%	28	6.51%	0	0.00%	365	84.88%	430
Nacogdoches	1,766	88.21%	92	4.60%	141	7.04%	3	0.15%	1,625	81.17%	2,002
Navarro	3,527	89.81%	294	7.49%	100	2.55%	6	0.15%	3,233	82.33%	3,927
Newton	493	88.35%	34	6.09%	23	4.12%	8	1.43%	459	82.26%	558
Nolan	1,048	85.97%	91	7.47%	79	6.48%	1	0.08%	957	78.51%	1,219
Nueces	1,830	76.35%	404	16.85%	142	5.92%	21	0.88%	1,426	59.49%	2,397
Ochiltree	238	82.93%	41	14.29%	8	2.79%	0	0.00%	197	68.64%	287
Oldham	138	75.00%	42	22.83%	0	0.00%	4	2.17%	96	52.17%	184
Orange	758	85.84%	92	10.42%	0	0.00%	33	3.74%	666	75.42%	883
Palo Pinto	1,431	77.44%	124	6.71%	282	15.26%	11	0.60%	1,149	62.18%	1,848
Panola	1,228	86.12%	125	8.77%	71	4.98%	2	0.14%	1,103	77.35%	1,426
Parker	1,797	80.69%	173	7.77%	240	10.78%	17	0.76%	1,557	69.91%	2,227
Parmer	194	70.80%	64	23.36%	10	3.65%	6	2.19%	130	47.45%	274
Pecos	394	79.44%	96	19.35%	2	0.40%	4	0.81%	298	60.08%	496
Polk	918	80.60%	107	9.39%	113	9.92%	1	0.09%	805	70.68%	1,139
Potter	1,288	82.62%	166	10.65%	99	6.35%	6	0.38%	1,122	71.97%	1,559
Presidio	245	89.74%	27	9.89%	0	0.00%	1	0.37%	218	79.85%	273
Rains	509	58.57%	71	8.17%	289	33.26%	0	0.00%	220	25.32%	869
Randall	341	80.81%	63	14.93%	6	1.42%	12	2.84%	278	65.88%	422
Reagan	59	95.16%	2	3.23%	0	0.00%	1	1.61%	57	91.94%	62
Real	242	85.21%	14	4.93%	25	8.80%	3	1.06%	217	76.41%	284
Red River	2,021	80.10%	356	14.11%	141	5.59%	5	0.20%	1,665	65.99%	2,523
Reeves	346	87.59%	43	10.89%	5	1.27%	1	0.25%	303	76.71%	395
Refugio	408	58.62%	232	33.33%	47	6.75%	9	1.29%	176	25.29%	696
Roberts	220	87.65%	27	10.76%	3	1.20%	1	0.40%	193	76.89%	251
Robertson	1,313	83.26%	218	13.82%	44	2.79%	2	0.13%	1,095	69.44%	1,577
Rockwall	828	94.95%	27	3.10%	0	0.00%	17	1.95%	801	91.86%	872
Runnels	1,487	81.66%	195	10.71%	133	7.30%	6	0.33%	1,292	70.95%	1,821
Rusk	1,849	72.00%	521	20.29%	196	7.63%	2	0.08%	1,328	51.71%	2,568
Sabine	681	89.72%	22	2.90%	54	7.11%	2	0.26%	627	82.61%	759
San Augustine	682	90.69%	18	2.39%	51	6.78%	1	0.13%	631	83.91%	752
San Jacinto	442	63.23%	255	36.48%	1	0.14%	1	0.14%	187	26.75%	699
San Patricio	594	74.53%	130	16.31%	65	8.16%	8	1.00%	464	58.22%	797
San Saba	935	85.31%	66	6.02%	90	8.21%	5	0.46%	845	77.10%	1,096
Schleicher	163	92.09%	10	5.65%	1	0.56%	3	1.69%	153	86.44%	177
Scurry	994	89.15%	40	3.59%	78	7.00%	3	0.27%	916	82.15%	1,115
Shackelford	378	80.94%	51	10.92%	36	7.71%	2	0.43%	327	70.02%	467
Shelby	1,767	84.99%	131	6.30%	175	8.42%	6	0.29%	1,592	76.58%	2,079
Sherman	152	75.25%	39	19.31%	9	4.46%	2	0.99%	113	55.94%	202
Smith	2,422	69.58%	773	22.21%	270	7.76%	16	0.46%	1,649	47.37%	3,481
Somervell	278	72.77%	20	5.24%	84	21.99%	0	0.00%	194	50.79%	382
Starr	516	81.77%	115	18.23%	0	0.00%	0	0.00%	401	63.55%	631
Stephens	572	83.26%	12	1.75%	103	14.99%	0	0.00%	469	68.27%	687
Sterling	205	96.70%	6	2.83%	0	0.00%	1	0.47%	199	93.87%	212
Stonewall	502	78.19%	21	3.27%	119	18.54%	0	0.00%	383	59.66%	642
Sutton	130	90.91%	13	9.09%	0	0.00%	0	0.00%	117	81.82%	143
Swisher	381	83.55%	62	13.60%	11	2.41%	2	0.44%	319	69.96%	456
Tarrant	10,269	84.08%	1,550	12.69%	329	2.69%	65	0.53%	8,719	71.39%	12,213
Taylor	2,134	89.89%	120	5.05%	118	4.97%	2	0.08%	2,014	84.84%	2,374
Terrell	181	74.79%	59	24.38%	2	0.83%	0	0.00%	122	50.41%	242
Terry	146	99.32%	1	0.68%	0	0.00%	0	0.00%	145	98.64%	147
Throckmorton	333	79.29%	10	2.38%	76	18.10%	1	0.24%	257	61.19%	420
Titus	1,164	79.18%	189	12.86%	95	6.46%	22	1.50%	975	66.33%	1,470
Tom Green	1,243	88.16%	92	6.52%	63	4.47%	12	0.85%	1,151	81.63%	1,410
Travis	3,682	82.54%	690	15.47%	71	1.59%	18	0.40%	2,992	67.07%	4,461
Trinity	906	78.44%	156	13.51%	91	7.88%	2	0.17%	750	64.94%	1,155
Tyler	635	92.03%	24	3.48%	31	4.49%	0	0.00%	604	87.54%	690
Upshur	1,346	80.36%	198	11.82%	121	7.22%	10	0.60%	1,148	68.54%	1,675
Upton	42	85.71%	6	12.24%	1	2.04%	0	0.00%	36	73.47%	49
Uvalde	728	87.29%	92	11.03%	13	1.56%	1	0.12%	636	76.26%	834
Val Verde	446	75.85%	135	22.96%	5	0.85%	2	0.34%	311	52.89%	588
Van Zandt	2,040	69.60%	232	7.92%	648	22.11%	11	0.38%	1,392	47.49%	2,931
Victoria	897	63.44%	476	33.66%	35	2.48%	6	0.42%	421	29.77%	1,414
Walker	763	69.17%	315	28.56%	24	2.18%	1	0.09%	448	40.62%	1,103
Waller	636	77.00%	182	22.03%	6	0.73%	2	0.24%	454	54.96%	826
Ward	178	84.36%	23	10.90%	8	3.79%	2	0.95%	155	73.46%	211
Washington	1,119	46.03%	1,306	53.72%	3	0.12%	3	0.12%	-187	-7.69%	2,431
Webb	676	58.89%	472	41.11%	0	0.00%	0	0.00%	204	17.77%	1,148
Wharton	948	67.67%	351	25.05%	85	6.07%	17	1.21%	597	42.61%	1,401
Wheeler	554	79.14%	56	8.00%	83	11.86%	7	1.00%	471	67.29%	700
Wichita	2,108	81.80%	347	13.47%	94	3.65%	28	1.09%	1,761	68.34%	2,577
Wilbarger	1,242	85.13%	99	6.79%	116	7.95%	2	0.14%	1,126	77.18%	1,459
Willacy	110	91.67%	10	8.33%	0	0.00%	0	0.00%	100	83.33%	120
Williamson	2,701	78.27%	656	19.01%	80	2.32%	14	0.41%	2,045	59.26%	3,451
Wilson	869	69.41%	346	27.64%	30	2.40%	7	0.56%	523	41.77%	1,252
Winkler	21	100.00%	0	0.00%	0	0.00%	0	0.00%	21	100.00%	21
Wise	2,023	82.57%	263	10.73%	9	0.37%	155	6.33%	1,760	71.84%	2,450
Wood	1,719	71.77%	248	10.35%	416	17.37%	12	0.50%	1,303	54.41%	2,395
Yoakum	85	97.70%	1	1.15%	1	1.15%	0	0.00%	84	96.55%	87
Young	1,175	84.65%	71	5.12%	71	5.12%	71	5.12%	1,104	79.54%	1,388
Zapata	26	10.83%	214	89.17%	0	0.00%	0	0.00%	-188	-78.33%	240
Zavala	229	78.69%	43	14.78%	17	5.84%	2	0.69%	186	63.92%	291
Bailey (Note: No returns were canvassed for Bailey County, Cochran County or Hockley County. Whatever voters existed in these counties were listed in totals for neighbouring counties)	0	N/A	0	N/A	0	N/A	0	N/A	0	N/A	0
Cochran	0	N/A	0	N/A	0	N/A	0	N/A	0	N/A	0
Hockley	0	N/A	0	N/A	0	N/A	0	N/A	0	N/A	0
Totals	286,415	76.93%	64,999	17.46%	18,963	5.09%	1,929	0.52%	221,416	59.47%	372,306

== See also ==
- United States presidential elections in Texas
