= 1932 United States presidential election in Texas =

- November 8, 1932

Nominee	Franklin D. Roosevelt	Herbert Hoover
Party	Democratic	Republican
Home state	New York	California
Running mate	John Nance Garner	Charles Curtis
Electoral vote	23	0
Popular vote	760,348	97,959
Percentage	88.06%	11.35%
County results
Roosevelt
60–70%
70–80%
80–90%
90–100%
President before election
Herbert Hoover
Republican
Elected President
Franklin D. Roosevelt
Democratic

The 1932 United States presidential election in Texas took place on November 8, 1932, as part of the 1932 United States presidential election, which was held throughout all contemporary 48 states. Voters chose 23 representatives, or electors to the Electoral College, who voted for president and vice president.

Texas voted for the Democratic nominee, Governor Franklin D. Roosevelt of New York, over the Republican nominee, incumbent President Herbert Hoover of California. Roosevelt ran with Speaker of the House John Nance Garner, a Texas native while Hoover ran with incumbent Vice President Charles Curtis of Kansas.

Roosevelt defeated Hoover in Texas by a landslide margin of 76.71%. In this era, Texas was a one-party Solid South state dominated by the Democratic Party, but Roosevelt's performance was overwhelming even relative to the many prior Democratic landslides, and remains the largest blowout victory by any presidential nominee in the state. Furthermore, Roosevelt carried every single county with more than 65% of the vote. This election constitutes the only time in history that a presidential candidate has swept all 254 counties in the state. (Note: In 1852, before the founding of the Republican Party and before much of the state had been incorporated, Franklin Pierce also swept all counties at the time.)

With 88.06%, Texas would prove to be Roosevelt's fifth strongest state in popular vote percentage after South Carolina, Mississippi, Louisiana and Georgia. To date, this is the last election in which Kendall County voted for a Democratic presidential candidate; in fact, despite Roosevelt carrying the county with over 73% of the vote, no Democrat since has reached even 45%.

== Results ==
1932 United States presidential election in Texas
Party	Candidate	Votes	Percentage	Electoral votes
Democratic	Franklin D. Roosevelt	760,348	88.06%	23
Republican	Herbert Hoover (incumbent)	97,959	11.35%	0
Socialist	Norman Thomas	4,450 (Note: There are significant differences between totals for minor parties given in Dave Leip’s U.S. Election Atlas, America at the Polls and Géoelections.)	0.52%	0
Liberty	William Hope Harvey	324	0.04%	0
Communist	William Z. Foster	207	0.02%	0
Jacksonian Democrat	No candidate	104	0.01%	0
Write-ins	Write-ins	34	0.00%	0
Totals		863,426	100.00%	23

=== Results by county ===
1932 United States presidential election in Texas by county
County	Franklin D. Roosevelt Democratic		Herbert Hoover Republican		Norman Thomas Socialist		William Hope Harvey Liberty		William Z. Foster Communist		Margin		Total votes cast
County	#	%	#	%	#	%	#	%	#	%	#	%	Total votes cast
Anderson	4,354	94.10%	259	5.60%	14	0.30%	0	0.00%	0	0.00%	4,095	88.50%	4,627
Andrews	186	96.37%	6	3.11%	0	0.00%	1	0.52%	0	0.00%	180	93.26%	193
Angelina	4,962	94.46%	287	5.46%	4	0.08%	0	0.00%	0	0.00%	4,675	89.00%	5,253
Aransas	268	87.01%	39	12.66%	1	0.32%	0	0.00%	0	0.00%	229	74.35%	308
Archer	1,555	94.01%	97	5.86%	2	0.12%	0	0.00%	0	0.00%	1,458	88.15%	1,654
Armstrong	813	92.70%	63	7.18%	1	0.11%	0	0.00%	0	0.00%	750	85.52%	877
Atascosa	2,101	91.07%	192	8.32%	14	0.61%	0	0.00%	0	0.00%	1,909	82.75%	2,307
Austin	2,806	94.96%	142	4.81%	7	0.24%	0	0.00%	0	0.00%	2,664	90.15%	2,955
Bailey	851	88.83%	104	10.86%	3	0.31%	0	0.00%	0	0.00%	747	77.97%	958
Bandera	883	70.70%	359	28.74%	6	0.48%	1	0.08%	0	0.00%	524	41.95%	1,249
Bastrop	3,077	94.42%	180	5.52%	1	0.03%	0	0.00%	1	0.03%	2,897	88.89%	3,259
Baylor	1,437	96.25%	55	3.68%	1	0.07%	0	0.00%	0	0.00%	1,382	92.57%	1,493
Bee	2,180	80.03%	534	19.60%	8	0.29%	0	0.00%	2	0.07%	1,646	60.43%	2,724
Bell	7,607	91.06%	724	8.67%	23	0.28%	0	0.00%	0	0.00%	6,883	82.39%	8,354
Bexar	37,765	82.83%	7,466	16.37%	332	0.73%	18	0.04%	13	0.03%	30,299	66.45%	45,594
Blanco	1,233	90.20%	127	9.29%	7	0.51%	0	0.00%	0	0.00%	1,106	80.91%	1,367
Borden	242	97.19%	7	2.81%	0	0.00%	0	0.00%	0	0.00%	235	94.38%	249
Bosque	3,214	92.12%	272	7.80%	3	0.09%	0	0.00%	0	0.00%	2,942	84.32%	3,489
Bowie	5,269	90.39%	541	9.28%	19	0.33%	0	0.00%	0	0.00%	4,728	81.11%	5,829
Brazoria	2,948	82.44%	617	17.25%	11	0.31%	0	0.00%	0	0.00%	2,331	65.18%	3,576
Brazos	2,588	92.40%	195	6.96%	18	0.64%	0	0.00%	0	0.00%	2,393	85.43%	2,801
Brewster	875	86.63%	130	12.87%	3	0.30%	2	0.20%	0	0.00%	745	73.76%	1,010
Briscoe	977	95.50%	42	4.11%	2	0.20%	2	0.20%	0	0.00%	935	91.40%	1,023
Brooks	608	87.23%	86	12.34%	3	0.43%	0	0.00%	0	0.00%	522	74.89%	697
Brown	4,024	91.98%	330	7.54%	19	0.43%	1	0.02%	1	0.02%	3,694	84.43%	4,375
Burleson	2,423	95.21%	119	4.68%	2	0.08%	0	0.00%	1	0.04%	2,304	90.53%	2,545
Burnet	1,904	92.88%	144	7.02%	0	0.00%	1	0.05%	1	0.05%	1,760	85.85%	2,050
Caldwell	3,317	91.88%	291	8.06%	2	0.06%	0	0.00%	0	0.00%	3,026	83.82%	3,610
Calhoun	834	88.35%	100	10.59%	10	1.06%	0	0.00%	0	0.00%	734	77.75%	944
Callahan	2,133	93.23%	152	6.64%	3	0.13%	0	0.00%	0	0.00%	1,981	86.58%	2,288
Cameron	7,146	79.53%	1,785	19.87%	51	0.57%	2	0.02%	1	0.01%	5,361	59.67%	8,985
Camp	1,416	94.97%	73	4.90%	2	0.13%	0	0.00%	0	0.00%	1,343	90.07%	1,491
Carson	1,391	86.67%	212	13.21%	2	0.12%	0	0.00%	0	0.00%	1,179	73.46%	1,605
Cass	3,135	93.33%	224	6.67%	0	0.00%	0	0.00%	0	0.00%	2,911	86.66%	3,359
Castro	949	92.77%	66	6.45%	8	0.78%	0	0.00%	0	0.00%	883	86.31%	1,023
Chambers	843	89.78%	91	9.69%	5	0.53%	0	0.00%	0	0.00%	752	80.09%	939
Cherokee	4,125	94.44%	233	5.33%	9	0.21%	1	0.02%	0	0.00%	3,892	89.10%	4,368
Childress	2,072	92.58%	153	6.84%	13	0.58%	0	0.00%	0	0.00%	1,919	85.75%	2,238
Clay	2,365	93.74%	151	5.98%	7	0.28%	0	0.00%	0	0.00%	2,214	87.75%	2,523
Cochran	345	88.92%	31	7.99%	12	3.09%	0	0.00%	0	0.00%	314	80.93%	388
Coke	983	93.89%	57	5.44%	6	0.57%	1	0.10%	0	0.00%	926	88.44%	1,047
Coleman	2,881	92.10%	235	7.51%	12	0.38%	0	0.00%	0	0.00%	2,646	84.59%	3,128
Collin	6,059	90.46%	589	8.79%	50	0.75%	0	0.00%	0	0.00%	5,470	81.67%	6,698
Collingsworth	1,753	93.29%	115	6.12%	8	0.43%	2	0.11%	1	0.05%	1,638	87.17%	1,879
Colorado	2,715	88.47%	331	10.79%	22	0.72%	1	0.03%	0	0.00%	2,384	77.68%	3,069
Comal	2,211	92.05%	176	7.33%	13	0.54%	1	0.04%	1	0.04%	2,035	84.72%	2,402
Comanche	3,134	93.86%	192	5.75%	13	0.39%	0	0.00%	0	0.00%	2,942	88.11%	3,339
Concho	1,126	95.91%	44	3.75%	4	0.34%	0	0.00%	0	0.00%	1,082	92.16%	1,174
Cooke	3,775	88.51%	470	11.02%	20	0.47%	0	0.00%	0	0.00%	3,305	77.49%	4,265
Coryell	3,347	94.52%	191	5.39%	3	0.08%	0	0.00%	0	0.00%	3,156	89.13%	3,541
Cottle	1,196	96.92%	38	3.08%	0	0.00%	0	0.00%	0	0.00%	1,158	93.84%	1,234
Crane	416	91.63%	37	8.15%	1	0.22%	0	0.00%	0	0.00%	379	83.48%	454
Crockett	329	66.20%	168	33.80%	0	0.00%	0	0.00%	0	0.00%	161	32.39%	497
Crosby	1,590	93.64%	108	6.36%	0	0.00%	0	0.00%	0	0.00%	1,482	87.28%	1,698
Culberson	285	93.75%	18	5.92%	0	0.00%	1	0.33%	0	0.00%	267	87.83%	304
Dallam	1,935	84.13%	341	14.83%	21	0.91%	2	0.09%	1	0.04%	1,594	69.30%	2,300
Dallas	37,363	80.09%	8,919	19.12%	354	0.76%	9	0.02%	8	0.02%	28,444	60.97%	46,653
Dawson	1,659	91.51%	153	8.44%	1	0.06%	0	0.00%	0	0.00%	1,506	83.07%	1,813
Deaf Smith	1,307	86.84%	198	13.16%	0	0.00%	0	0.00%	0	0.00%	1,109	73.69%	1,505
Delta	2,013	95.81%	87	4.14%	1	0.05%	0	0.00%	0	0.00%	1,926	91.67%	2,101
Denton	5,115	90.10%	520	9.16%	39	0.69%	3	0.05%	0	0.00%	4,595	80.94%	5,677
De Witt	3,206	91.05%	309	8.78%	4	0.11%	1	0.03%	1	0.03%	2,897	82.28%	3,521
Dickens	1,491	95.45%	63	4.03%	7	0.45%	1	0.06%	0	0.00%	1,428	91.42%	1,562
Dimmit	843	77.34%	241	22.11%	5	0.46%	1	0.09%	0	0.00%	602	55.23%	1,090
Donley	1,626	91.71%	141	7.95%	5	0.28%	0	0.00%	1	0.06%	1,485	83.76%	1,773
Duval	1,566	98.12%	30	1.88%	0	0.00%	0	0.00%	0	0.00%	1,536	96.24%	1,596
Eastland	4,958	89.24%	598	10.76%	0	0.00%	0	0.00%	0	0.00%	4,360	78.47%	5,556
Ector	530	89.08%	37	6.22%	1	0.17%	19	3.19%	8	1.34%	493	82.86%	595
Edwards	575	71.52%	224	27.86%	4	0.50%	1	0.12%	0	0.00%	351	43.66%	804
Ellis	7,033	92.49%	527	6.93%	39	0.51%	0	0.00%	5	0.07%	6,506	85.56%	7,604
El Paso	11,336	78.77%	2,841	19.74%	214	1.49%	1	0.01%	0	0.00%	8,495	59.03%	14,392
Erath	3,319	91.46%	284	7.83%	20	0.55%	5	0.14%	1	0.03%	3,035	83.63%	3,629
Falls	3,896	95.40%	181	4.43%	7	0.17%	0	0.00%	0	0.00%	3,715	90.96%	4,084
Fannin	5,338	91.80%	460	7.91%	16	0.28%	0	0.00%	1	0.02%	4,878	83.89%	5,815
Fayette	4,985	95.26%	245	4.68%	3	0.06%	0	0.00%	0	0.00%	4,740	90.58%	5,233
Fisher	1,395	92.63%	105	6.97%	6	0.40%	0	0.00%	0	0.00%	1,290	85.66%	1,506
Floyd	1,976	92.94%	145	6.82%	4	0.19%	1	0.05%	0	0.00%	1,831	86.12%	2,126
Foard	882	93.04%	53	5.59%	13	1.37%	0	0.00%	0	0.00%	829	87.45%	948
Fort Bend	3,109	95.22%	148	4.53%	8	0.25%	0	0.00%	0	0.00%	2,961	90.69%	3,265
Franklin	1,305	95.81%	56	4.11%	0	0.00%	0	0.00%	1	0.07%	1,249	91.70%	1,362
Freestone	2,481	93.41%	170	6.40%	5	0.19%	0	0.00%	0	0.00%	2,311	87.01%	2,656
Frio	998	87.54%	142	12.46%	0	0.00%	0	0.00%	0	0.00%	856	75.09%	1,140
Gaines	510	90.75%	44	7.83%	8	1.42%	0	0.00%	0	0.00%	466	82.92%	562
Galveston	10,491	83.38%	2,011	15.98%	71	0.56%	4	0.03%	5	0.04%	8,480	67.40%	12,582
Garza	812	89.82%	87	9.62%	5	0.55%	0	0.00%	0	0.00%	725	80.20%	904
Gillespie	2,642	79.65%	662	19.96%	12	0.36%	1	0.03%	0	0.00%	1,980	59.69%	3,317
Glasscock	212	83.46%	42	16.54%	0	0.00%	0	0.00%	0	0.00%	170	66.93%	254
Goliad	1,542	89.76%	170	9.90%	1	0.06%	4	0.23%	1	0.06%	1,372	79.86%	1,718
Gonzales	3,384	90.77%	337	9.04%	5	0.13%	1	0.03%	1	0.03%	3,047	81.73%	3,728
Gray	3,446	86.69%	505	12.70%	22	0.55%	1	0.03%	1	0.03%	2,941	73.99%	3,975
Grayson	9,631	87.62%	1,317	11.98%	42	0.38%	2	0.02%	0	0.00%	8,314	75.64%	10,992
Gregg	5,204	93.38%	341	6.12%	20	0.36%	0	0.00%	8	0.14%	4,863	87.26%	5,573
Grimes	2,065	92.89%	153	6.88%	4	0.18%	1	0.04%	0	0.00%	1,912	86.01%	2,223
Guadalupe	3,751	84.27%	691	15.52%	9	0.20%	0	0.00%	0	0.00%	3,060	68.75%	4,451
Hale	3,029	88.13%	369	10.74%	39	1.13%	0	0.00%	0	0.00%	2,660	77.39%	3,437
Hall	2,114	95.31%	91	4.10%	13	0.59%	0	0.00%	0	0.00%	2,023	91.21%	2,218
Hamilton	2,474	93.64%	164	6.21%	2	0.08%	1	0.04%	1	0.04%	2,310	87.43%	2,642
Hansford	803	89.12%	67	7.44%	30	3.33%	1	0.11%	0	0.00%	736	81.69%	901
Hardeman	1,985	92.97%	145	6.79%	5	0.23%	0	0.00%	0	0.00%	1,840	86.18%	2,135
Hardin	2,783	94.53%	161	5.47%	0	0.00%	0	0.00%	0	0.00%	2,622	89.06%	2,944
Harris	46,886	83.77%	8,604	15.37%	426	0.76%	9	0.02%	45	0.08%	38,282	68.40%	55,970
Harrison	4,057	88.12%	528	11.47%	19	0.41%	0	0.00%	0	0.00%	3,529	76.65%	4,604
Hartley	586	88.79%	74	11.21%	0	0.00%	0	0.00%	0	0.00%	512	77.58%	660
Haskell	2,330	93.20%	154	6.16%	16	0.64%	0	0.00%	0	0.00%	2,176	87.04%	2,500
Hays	1,822	88.88%	220	10.73%	7	0.34%	1	0.05%	0	0.00%	1,602	78.15%	2,050
Hemphill	918	87.26%	133	12.64%	1	0.10%	0	0.00%	0	0.00%	785	74.62%	1,052
Henderson	3,522	93.67%	219	5.82%	19	0.51%	0	0.00%	0	0.00%	3,303	87.85%	3,760
Hidalgo	9,695	75.84%	2,969	23.22%	100	0.78%	14	0.11%	6	0.05%	6,726	52.61%	12,784
Hill	5,297	93.55%	360	6.36%	4	0.07%	1	0.02%	0	0.00%	4,937	87.20%	5,662
Hockley	1,513	93.22%	76	4.68%	34	2.09%	0	0.00%	0	0.00%	1,437	88.54%	1,623
Hood	1,119	90.98%	106	8.62%	5	0.41%	0	0.00%	0	0.00%	1,013	82.36%	1,230
Hopkins	4,891	94.81%	261	5.06%	7	0.14%	0	0.00%	0	0.00%	4,630	89.75%	5,159
Houston	3,087	94.84%	165	5.07%	3	0.09%	0	0.00%	0	0.00%	2,922	89.77%	3,255
Howard	2,733	94.40%	149	5.15%	13	0.45%	0	0.00%	0	0.00%	2,584	89.26%	2,895
Hudspeth	341	91.42%	31	8.31%	0	0.00%	1	0.27%	0	0.00%	310	83.11%	373
Hunt	6,856	93.41%	465	6.34%	13	0.18%	0	0.00%	6	0.08%	6,391	87.07%	7,340
Hutchinson	1,976	78.79%	505	20.14%	26	1.04%	0	0.00%	1	0.04%	1,471	58.65%	2,508
Irion	398	87.28%	47	10.31%	11	2.41%	0	0.00%	0	0.00%	351	76.97%	456
Jack	1,429	87.45%	189	11.57%	14	0.86%	0	0.00%	2	0.12%	1,240	75.89%	1,634
Jackson	1,030	84.84%	182	14.99%	2	0.16%	0	0.00%	0	0.00%	848	69.85%	1,214
Jasper	1,990	95.49%	93	4.46%	1	0.05%	0	0.00%	0	0.00%	1,897	91.03%	2,084
Jeff Davis	252	83.44%	46	15.23%	4	1.32%	0	0.00%	0	0.00%	206	68.21%	302
Jefferson	17,129	82.09%	3,584	17.18%	145	0.69%	1	0.00%	6	0.03%	13,545	64.92%	20,865
Jim Hogg	428	89.35%	51	10.65%	0	0.00%	0	0.00%	0	0.00%	377	78.71%	479
Jim Wells	1,449	89.39%	162	9.99%	8	0.49%	0	0.00%	2	0.12%	1,287	79.40%	1,621
Johnson	4,858	89.88%	530	9.81%	17	0.31%	0	0.00%	0	0.00%	4,328	80.07%	5,405
Jones	2,934	92.03%	224	7.03%	14	0.44%	12	0.38%	4	0.13%	2,710	85.01%	3,188
Karnes	2,458	92.75%	186	7.02%	4	0.15%	2	0.08%	0	0.00%	2,272	85.74%	2,650
Kaufman	4,116	93.78%	268	6.11%	5	0.11%	0	0.00%	0	0.00%	3,848	87.67%	4,389
Kendall	1,185	73.65%	416	25.85%	5	0.31%	2	0.12%	1	0.06%	769	47.79%	1,609
Kenedy	123	95.35%	5	3.88%	0	0.00%	1	0.78%	0	0.00%	118	91.47%	129
Kent	561	95.57%	23	3.92%	3	0.51%	0	0.00%	0	0.00%	538	91.65%	587
Kerr	2,165	77.21%	623	22.22%	15	0.53%	1	0.04%	0	0.00%	1,542	54.99%	2,804
Kimble	890	87.77%	121	11.93%	3	0.30%	0	0.00%	0	0.00%	769	75.84%	1,014
King	224	98.25%	4	1.75%	0	0.00%	0	0.00%	0	0.00%	220	96.49%	228
Kinney	678	88.28%	89	11.59%	0	0.00%	1	0.13%	0	0.00%	589	76.69%	768
Kleberg	1,727	88.56%	198	10.15%	23	1.18%	2	0.10%	0	0.00%	1,529	78.41%	1,950
Knox	1,600	93.79%	102	5.98%	4	0.23%	0	0.00%	0	0.00%	1,498	87.81%	1,706
Lamar	5,911	93.72%	375	5.95%	16	0.25%	5	0.08%	0	0.00%	5,536	87.78%	6,307
Lamb	2,978	90.57%	271	8.24%	39	1.19%	0	0.00%	0	0.00%	2,707	82.33%	3,288
Lampasas	1,824	93.83%	120	6.17%	0	0.00%	0	0.00%	0	0.00%	1,704	87.65%	1,944
La Salle	810	89.50%	92	10.17%	3	0.33%	0	0.00%	0	0.00%	718	79.34%	905
Lavaca	4,378	94.91%	224	4.86%	9	0.20%	2	0.04%	0	0.00%	4,154	90.05%	4,613
Lee	1,831	94.33%	110	5.67%	0	0.00%	0	0.00%	0	0.00%	1,721	88.67%	1,941
Leon	1,958	94.32%	108	5.20%	9	0.43%	0	0.00%	1	0.05%	1,850	89.11%	2,076
Liberty	2,527	90.38%	247	8.83%	18	0.64%	0	0.00%	4	0.14%	2,280	81.55%	2,796
Limestone	4,416	95.28%	215	4.64%	3	0.06%	1	0.02%	0	0.00%	4,201	90.64%	4,635
Lipscomb	865	68.06%	349	27.46%	19	1.49%	0	0.00%	38	2.99%	516	40.60%	1,271
Live Oak	1,070	89.77%	114	9.56%	7	0.59%	0	0.00%	1	0.08%	956	80.20%	1,192
Llano	1,229	91.92%	108	8.08%	0	0.00%	0	0.00%	0	0.00%	1,121	83.84%	1,337
Loving	187	86.98%	27	12.56%	1	0.47%	0	0.00%	0	0.00%	160	74.42%	215
Lubbock	5,330	89.53%	590	9.91%	29	0.49%	1	0.02%	3	0.05%	4,740	79.62%	5,953
Lynn	1,930	94.24%	110	5.37%	8	0.39%	0	0.00%	0	0.00%	1,820	88.87%	2,048
McCulloch	2,006	88.10%	265	11.64%	6	0.26%	0	0.00%	0	0.00%	1,741	76.46%	2,277
McLennan	11,972	90.80%	1,108	8.40%	100	0.76%	1	0.01%	4	0.03%	10,864	82.40%	13,185
McMullen	258	95.56%	12	4.44%	0	0.00%	0	0.00%	0	0.00%	246	91.11%	270
Madison	1,344	98.53%	20	1.47%	0	0.00%	0	0.00%	0	0.00%	1,324	97.07%	1,364
Marion	861	90.54%	84	8.83%	6	0.63%	0	0.00%	0	0.00%	777	81.70%	951
Martin	694	93.28%	44	5.91%	2	0.27%	4	0.54%	0	0.00%	650	87.37%	744
Mason	828	72.57%	309	27.08%	4	0.35%	0	0.00%	0	0.00%	519	45.49%	1,141
Matagorda	2,039	82.85%	408	16.58%	14	0.57%	0	0.00%	0	0.00%	1,631	66.27%	2,461
Maverick	847	80.21%	199	18.84%	10	0.95%	0	0.00%	0	0.00%	648	61.36%	1,056
Medina	2,516	82.87%	515	16.96%	3	0.10%	2	0.07%	0	0.00%	2,001	65.91%	3,036
Menard	901	85.57%	150	14.25%	2	0.19%	0	0.00%	0	0.00%	751	71.32%	1,053
Midland	1,245	88.80%	136	9.70%	4	0.29%	15	1.07%	2	0.14%	1,109	79.10%	1,402
Milam	4,676	94.22%	264	5.32%		0.46%	0	0.00%	0	0.00%	4,412	88.90%	4,963
Mills	1,434	91.51%	133	8.49%	0	0.00%	0	0.00%	0	0.00%	1,301	83.02%	1,567
Mitchell	1,490	90.85%	148	9.02%	2	0.12%	0	0.00%	0	0.00%	1,342	81.83%	1,640
Montague	3,090	91.39%	262	7.75%		0.77%	3	0.09%	0	0.00%	2,828	83.64%	3,381
Montgomery	1,971	93.90%	126	6.00%	2	0.10%	0	0.00%	0	0.00%	1,845	87.90%	2,099
Moore	549	90.44%	56	9.23%	2	0.33%	0	0.00%	0	0.00%	493	81.22%	607
Morris	1,253	97.06%	38	2.94%	0	0.00%	0	0.00%	0	0.00%	1,215	94.11%	1,291
Motley	900	96.15%	34	3.63%	1	0.11%	1	0.11%	0	0.00%	866	92.52%	936
Nacogdoches	3,603	96.70%	117	3.14%	6	0.16%	0	0.00%	0	0.00%	3,486	93.56%	3,726
Navarro	6,392	92.44%	512	7.40%	11	0.16%	0	0.00%	0	0.00%	5,880	85.03%	6,915
Newton	1,586	97.00%	46	2.81%	2	0.12%	0	0.00%	1	0.06%	1,540	94.19%	1,635
Nolan	2,453	91.70%	219	8.19%	2	0.07%	1	0.04%	0	0.00%	2,234	83.51%	2,675
Nueces	6,659	86.91%	967	12.62%	35	0.46%	1	0.01%	0	0.00%	5,692	74.29%	7,662
Ochiltree	1,097	84.97%	183	14.18%	11	0.85%	0	0.00%	0	0.00%	914	70.80%	1,291
Oldham	432	87.63%	61	12.37%	0	0.00%	0	0.00%	0	0.00%	371	75.25%	493
Orange	2,830	91.94%	244	7.93%	4	0.13%	0	0.00%	0	0.00%	2,586	84.02%	3,078
Palo Pinto	2,722	87.02%	392	12.53%	14	0.45%	0	0.00%	0	0.00%	2,330	74.49%	3,128
Panola	2,630	97.08%	50	1.85%	29	1.07%	0	0.00%	0	0.00%	2,580	95.24%	2,709
Parker	3,074	88.28%	372	10.68%	36	1.03%	0	0.00%	0	0.00%	2,702	77.60%	3,482
Parmer	1,154	87.49%	148	11.22%	16	1.21%	1	0.08%	0	0.00%	1,006	76.27%	1,319
Pecos	1,261	87.09%	180	12.43%	7	0.48%	0	0.00%	0	0.00%	1,081	74.65%	1,448
Polk	2,117	94.98%	110	4.93%	2	0.09%	0	0.00%	0	0.00%	2,007	90.04%	2,229
Potter	6,366	83.29%	1,233	16.13%	40	0.52%	3	0.04%	1	0.01%	5,133	67.16%	7,643
Presidio	863	88.33%	112	11.46%	1	0.10%	1	0.10%	0	0.00%	751	76.87%	977
Rains	937	95.13%	41	4.16%	7	0.71%	0	0.00%	0	0.00%	896	90.96%	985
Randall	1,394	85.10%	231	14.10%	10	0.61%	2	0.12%	1	0.06%	1,163	71.00%	1,638
Reagan	681	84.28%	124	15.35%	3	0.37%	0	0.00%	0	0.00%	557	68.94%	808
Real	335	79.01%	89	20.99%	0	0.00%	0	0.00%	0	0.00%	246	58.02%	424
Red River	3,181	95.44%	145	4.35%	7	0.21%	0	0.00%	0	0.00%	3,036	91.09%	3,333
Reeves	1,085	89.60%	122	10.07%	4	0.33%	0	0.00%	0	0.00%	963	79.52%	1,211
Refugio	1,201	86.15%	172	12.34%	3	0.22%	18	1.29%	0	0.00%	1,029	73.82%	1,394
Roberts	451	91.85%	36	7.33%	3	0.61%	1	0.20%	0	0.00%	415	84.52%	491
Robertson	2,396	94.18%	148	5.82%	0	0.00%	0	0.00%	0	0.00%	2,248	88.36%	2,544
Rockwall	1,237	95.23%	62	4.77%	0	0.00%	0	0.00%	0	0.00%	1,175	90.45%	1,299
Runnels	2,975	92.39%	235	7.30%	10	0.31%	0	0.00%	0	0.00%	2,740	85.09%	3,220
Rusk	5,074	91.16%	483	8.68%	9	0.16%	0	0.00%	0	0.00%	4,591	82.48%	5,566
Sabine	1,789	96.76%	57	3.08%	3	0.16%	0	0.00%	0	0.00%	1,732	93.67%	1,849
San Augustine	1,802	98.96%	19	1.04%	0	0.00%	0	0.00%	0	0.00%	1,783	97.91%	1,821
San Jacinto	828	97.64%	16	1.89%	4	0.47%	0	0.00%	0	0.00%	812	95.75%	848
San Patricio	2,142	83.48%	407	15.86%	13	0.51%	4	0.16%	0	0.00%	1,735	67.61%	2,566
San Saba	1,904	93.89%	122	6.02%	2	0.10%	0	0.00%	0	0.00%	1,782	87.87%	2,028
Schleicher	516	87.16%	76	12.84%	0	0.00%	0	0.00%	0	0.00%	440	74.32%	592
Scurry	1,604	93.75%	105	6.14%	2	0.12%	0	0.00%	0	0.00%	1,499	87.61%	1,711
Shackelford	1,316	91.52%	117	8.14%	3	0.21%	1	0.07%	1	0.07%	1,199	83.38%	1,438
Shelby	3,594	96.25%	120	3.21%	20	0.54%	0	0.00%	0	0.00%	3,474	93.04%	3,734
Sherman	515	84.56%	91	14.94%	3	0.49%	0	0.00%	0	0.00%	424	69.62%	609
Smith	7,424	90.53%	750	9.15%	25	0.30%	0	0.00%	2	0.02%	6,674	81.38%	8,201
Somervell	561	89.90%	43	6.89%	20	3.21%	0	0.00%	0	0.00%	518	83.01%	624
Starr	754	95.93%	32	4.07%	0	0.00%	0	0.00%	0	0.00%	722	91.86%	786
Stephens	2,684	90.40%	256	8.62%	23	0.77%	1	0.03%	5	0.17%	2,428	81.78%	2,969
Sterling	354	96.46%	13	3.54%	0	0.00%	0	0.00%	0	0.00%	341	92.92%	367
Stonewall	976	95.13%	50	4.87%	0	0.00%	0	0.00%	0	0.00%	926	90.25%	1,026
Sutton	372	76.70%	113	23.30%	0	0.00%	0	0.00%	0	0.00%	259	53.40%	485
Swisher	1,448	88.78%	166	10.18%	16	0.98%	1	0.06%	0	0.00%	1,282	78.60%	1,631
Tarrant	27,836	83.06%	5,251	15.67%	423	1.26%	0	0.00%	3	0.01%	22,585	67.39%	33,513
Taylor	5,235	88.95%	639	10.86%	10	0.17%	0	0.00%	1	0.02%	4,596	78.10%	5,885
Terrell	479	78.14%	133	21.70%	1	0.16%	0	0.00%	0	0.00%	346	56.44%	613
Terry	1,448	93.84%	87	5.64%	7	0.45%	1	0.06%	0	0.00%	1,361	88.20%	1,543
Throckmorton	932	90.57%	95	9.23%	2	0.19%	0	0.00%	0	0.00%	837	81.34%	1,029
Titus	2,523	96.96%	75	2.88%	3	0.12%	0	0.00%	1	0.04%	2,448	94.08%	2,602
Tom Green	4,957	86.75%	739	12.93%	16	0.28%	0	0.00%	2	0.04%	4,218	73.82%	5,714
Travis	11,718	87.60%	1,532	11.45%	123	0.92%	1	0.01%	2	0.01%	10,186	76.15%	13,376
Trinity	1,514	95.70%	65	4.11%	3	0.19%	0	0.00%	0	0.00%	1,449	91.59%	1,582
Tyler	1,450	96.99%	44	2.94%	1	0.07%	0	0.00%	0	0.00%	1,406	94.05%	1,495
Upshur	2,900	95.39%	129	4.24%		0.23%	4	0.13%	0	0.00%	2,771	91.15%	3,040
Upton	1,012	91.17%	92	8.29%	5	0.45%	1	0.09%	0	0.00%	920	82.88%	1,110
Uvalde	1,759	80.47%	422	19.30%	4	0.18%	0	0.00%	1	0.05%	1,337	61.16%	2,186
Val Verde	1,412	76.86%	421	22.92%	2	0.11%	0	0.00%	2	0.11%	991	53.95%	1,837
Van Zandt	4,203	94.92%	190	4.29%	35	0.79%	0	0.00%	0	0.00%	4,013	90.63%	4,428
Victoria	2,777	93.44%	190	6.39%		0.10%	2	0.07%	0	0.00%	2,587	87.05%	2,972
Walker	1,811	95.17%	83	4.36%	8	0.42%	1	0.05%	0	0.00%	1,728	90.80%	1,903
Waller	1,192	92.83%	89	6.93%	3	0.23%	0	0.00%	0	0.00%	1,103	85.90%	1,284
Ward	678	89.80%	70	9.27%	3	0.40%	2	0.26%	2	0.26%	608	80.53%	755
Washington	3,443	97.12%	99	2.79%	2	0.06%	0	0.00%	1	0.03%	3,344	94.33%	3,545
Webb	4,299	86.52%	657	13.22%	8	0.16%	5	0.10%	0	0.00%	3,642	73.29%	4,969
Wharton	3,357	88.53%	405	10.68%	28	0.74%	0	0.00%	2	0.05%	2,952	77.85%	3,792
Wheeler	2,263	92.56%	165	6.75%	16	0.65%	0	0.00%	1	0.04%	2,098	85.81%	2,445
Wichita	8,889	85.36%	1,479	14.20%	42	0.40%	1	0.01%	2	0.02%	7,410	71.16%	10,413
Wilbarger	3,397	94.13%	199	5.51%	12	0.33%	1	0.03%	0	0.00%	3,198	88.61%	3,609
Willacy	1,042	80.03%	259	19.89%	1	0.08%	0	0.00%	0	0.00%	783	60.14%	1,302
Williamson	6,783	94.03%	418	5.79%	13	0.18%	0	0.00%	0	0.00%	6,365	88.23%	7,214
Wilson	2,435	93.22%	174	6.66%	3	0.11%	0	0.00%	0	0.00%	2,261	86.56%	2,612
Winkler	642	88.19%	78	10.71%	6	0.82%	2	0.27%	0	0.00%	564	77.47%	728
Wise	2,681	89.97%	286	9.60%	13	0.44%	0	0.00%	0	0.00%	2,395	80.37%	2,980
Wood	3,308	94.08%	189	5.38%	18	0.51%	0	0.00%	1	0.03%	3,119	88.71%	3,516
Yoakum	245	95.33%	11	4.28%	1	0.39%	0	0.00%	0	0.00%	234	91.05%	257
Young	3,156	90.64%	320	9.19%	5	0.14%	1	0.03%	0	0.00%	2,836	81.45%	3,482
Zapata	271	91.86%	24	8.14%	0	0.00%	0	0.00%	0	0.00%	247	83.73%	295
Zavala	783	82.16%	166	17.42%	4	0.42%	0	0.00%	0	0.00%	617	64.74%	953
Totals	771,109	88.19%	98,218	11.23%	4,421	0.51%	235	0.03%	224	0.03%	672,891	76.95%	874,398 (Note: This total includes 157 “Jacksonian” and 34 write-in votes not separated by county.)

==== Counties that flipped from Republican to Democratic ====
- Anderson
- Aransas
- Andrews
- Bandera
- Atascosa
- Bailey
- Bee
- Bell
- Blanco
- Borden
- Bosque
- Brazoria
- Brewster
- Burnet
- Brown
- Brazos
- Callahan
- Cameron
- Carson
- Chambers
- Childress
- Clay
- Cochran
- Coke
- Coleman
- Collingsworth
- Collin
- Comanche
- Concho
- Crockett
- Cooke
- Cottle
- Crosby
- Dallam
- Dallas
- Dawson
- Denton
- Deaf Smith
- Dickens
- Dimmit
- Donley
- Eastland
- Ector
- Edwards
- Erath
- Fisher
- Floyd
- Frio
- Gaines
- Garza
- Gillespie
- Glasscock
- Goliad
- Grayson
- Gray
- Hall
- Hale
- Hansford
- Hardeman
- Harris
- Hays
- Hartley
- Hemphill
- Hidalgo
- Hill
- Hockley
- Hood
- Hutchinson
- Hudspeth
- Howard
- Irion
- Jack
- Jackson
- Jeff Davis
- Jefferson
- Johnson
- Jones
- Kendall
- Kent
- Kerr
- King
- Kimble
- Kleberg
- Knox
- Lamar
- Lamb
- Lampasas
- Liberty
- Lipscomb
- Live Oak
- McCulloch
- Lynn
- Lubbock
- McLennan
- McMullen
- Martin
- Mason
- Matagorda
- Maverick
- Mills
- Menard
- Mitchell
- Montague
- Motley
- Nolan
- Ochiltree
- Oldham
- Palo Pinto
- Parker
- Parmer
- Potter
- Randall
- Reagan
- Real
- Roberts
- Runnels
- San Patricio
- Schleicher
- Scurry
- Shackelford
- Sherman
- Smith
- Somervell
- Stephens
- Sutton
- Swisher
- Tarrant
- Taylor
- Terrell
- Terry
- Throckmorton
- Tom Green
- Travis
- Val Verde
- Upton
- Uvalde
- Wheeler
- Wichita
- Wilbarger
- Wise
- Yoakum
- Zavala
- Young

== See also ==
- United States presidential elections in Texas
