= Donley County, Texas =

County in Texas, United States

- County
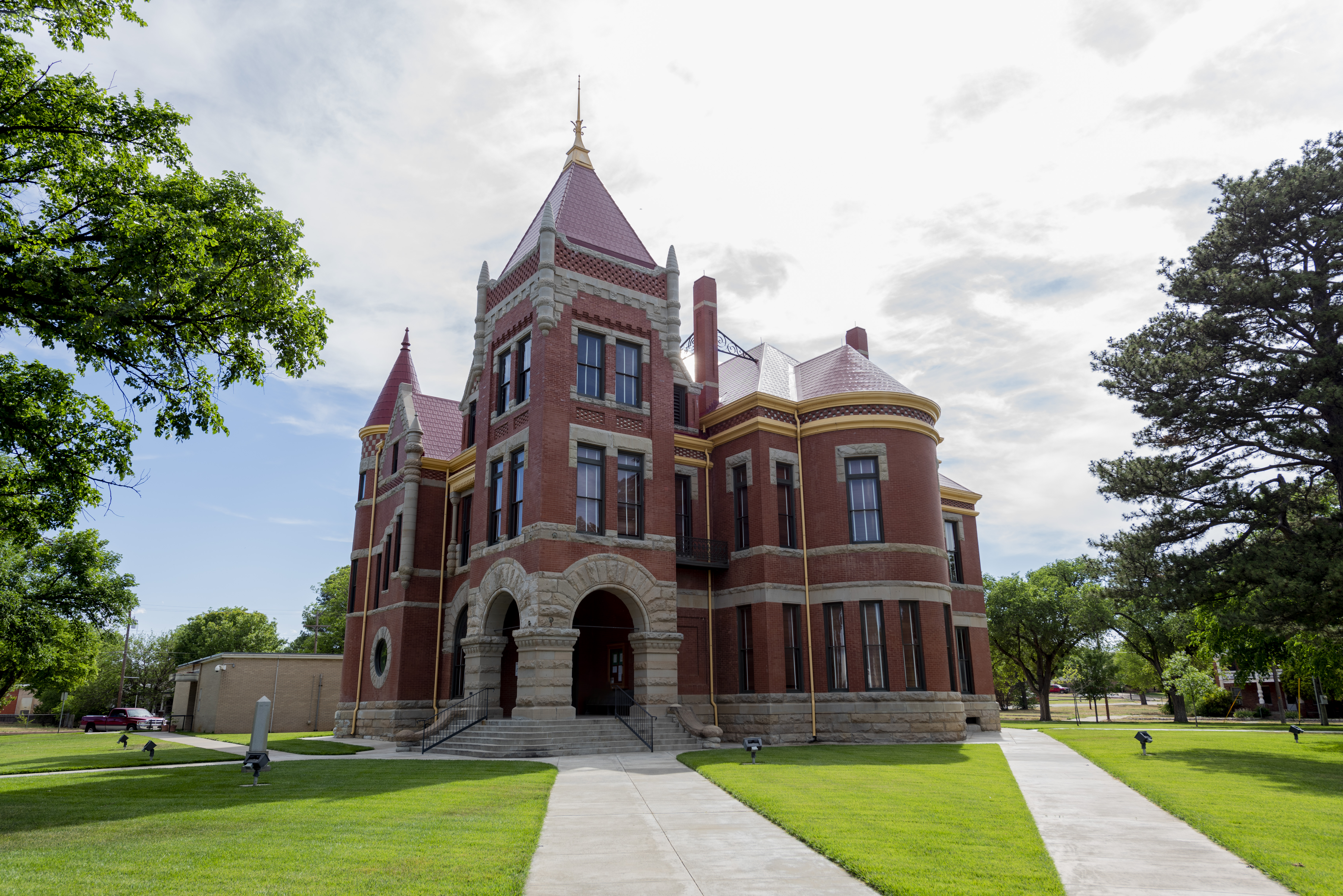
- 1890 Donley County Courthouse in Clarendon

- Location within the U.S. state of Texas
- Coordinates: 34°58′N 100°49′W
- Country: United States
- State: Texas
- Founded: 1882
- Seat: Clarendon
- Largest city: Clarendon

Area
  - Total: 933 sq mi (2,420 km^{2})
  - Land: 927 sq mi (2,400 km^{2})
  - Water: 6.2 sq mi (16 km^{2}) 0.7%

Population (2020)
  - Total: 3,258
  - Estimate (2025): 3,213 ▼
  - Density: 3.51/sq mi (1.36/km^{2})
- Time zone: UTC−6 (Central)
  - Summer (DST): UTC−5 (CDT)
- Congressional district: 13th
- Website: www.co.donley.tx.us

Donley County is a county located in the U.S. state of Texas. As of the 2020 census, its population was 3,258. Its county seat is Clarendon. The county was created in 1876 and later organized in 1882.

== History ==
Donley County was established in 1876 from land given by the Bexar District. It is named for Stockton P. Donley, justice of the state supreme court.

Several historical sites are listed on the National Register of Historic Places in Donley County.

== Geography ==
According to the U.S. Census Bureau, the county has a total land area of 933 sq mi (2,420 km^{2}), of which 5.6 sq mi (15 km^{2}) (0.7%) are covered by water.

=== Major highways ===
- I-40
- US 287
- SH 70
- SH 203
- SH 273

=== Adjacent counties ===
- Gray County (north)
- Wheeler County (northeast)
- Collingsworth County (east)
- Hall County (south)
- Briscoe County (southwest)
- Armstrong County (west)
- Carson County (northwest)

== Demographics ==
Historical population
| Census | Pop. | Note | %± |
|---|---|---|---|
| 1880 | 160 | | — |
| 1890 | 1,056 | | 560.0% |
| 1900 | 2,756 | | 161.0% |
| 1910 | 5,284 | | 91.7% |
| 1920 | 8,035 | | 52.1% |
| 1930 | 10,262 | | 27.7% |
| 1940 | 7,487 | | −27.0% |
| 1950 | 6,216 | | −17.0% |
| 1960 | 4,449 | | −28.4% |
| 1970 | 3,641 | | −18.2% |
| 1980 | 4,075 | | 11.9% |
| 1990 | 3,696 | | −9.3% |
| 2000 | 3,828 | | 3.6% |
| 2010 | 3,677 | | −3.9% |
| 2020 | 3,258 | | −11.4% |
| 2025 (est.) | 3,213 | ▼ | −1.4% |
U.S. Decennial Census; 1850–2010 2010 2020

=== Racial and ethnic composition ===
Donley County, Texas – Racial and ethnic composition Note: the US Census treats Hispanic/Latino as an ethnic category. This table excludes Latinos from the racial categories and assigns them to a separate category. Hispanics/Latinos may be of any race.
| Race / Ethnicity (NH = Non-Hispanic) | Pop 2000 | Pop 2010 | Pop 2020 | 2000 | 2010 | 2020 |
|---|---|---|---|---|---|---|
| White alone (NH) | 3,372 | 3,136 | 2,537 | 88.09% | 85.29% | 77.87% |
| Black or African American alone (NH) | 151 | 163 | 167 | 3.94% | 4.43% | 5.13% |
| Native American or Alaska Native alone (NH) | 29 | 15 | 27 | 0.76% | 0.41% | 0.83% |
| Asian alone (NH) | 4 | 9 | 10 | 0.10% | 0.24% | 0.31% |
| Pacific Islander alone (NH) | 0 | 2 | 1 | 0.00% | 0.05% | 0.03% |
| Other race alone (NH) | 0 | 0 | 6 | 0.00% | 0.00% | 0.18% |
| Multiracial (NH) | 29 | 43 | 154 | 0.76% | 1.17% | 4.73% |
| Hispanic or Latino (any race) | 243 | 309 | 356 | 6.35% | 8.40% | 10.93% |
| Total | 3,828 | 3,677 | 3,258 | 100.00% | 100.00% | 100.00% |

=== 2020 census ===
As of the 2020 census, the county had a population of 3,258. The median age was 46.5 years; 20.5% of residents were under 18 and 25.8% were 65 or older. For every 100 females there were 100.7 males, and for every 100 females 18 and over there were 102.7 males 18 and over.

As of the 2020 census, the racial makeup of the county was 81.3% White, 5.3% Black or African American, 1.0% American Indian and Alaska Native, 0.3% Asian, <0.1% Native Hawaiian and Pacific Islander, 3.7% from some other race, and 8.5% from two or more races. Hispanic or Latino residents of any race comprised 10.9% of the population.

About 0.1% of residents lived in urban areas, while almost 100.0% lived in rural areas.

Of the 1,340 households in the county, 26.5% had children under 18 living in them, 49.8% were married-couple households, 19.4% were households with a male householder and no spouse or partner present, and 27.4% were households with a female householder and no spouse or partner present. About 32.6% of all households were made up of individuals, and 19.1% had someone living alone who was 65 or older.

Of the 1,942 housing units, 31.0% were vacant; of 1,340 occupied units, 72.0% were owner-occupied and 28.0% were renter-occupied. The homeowner vacancy rate was 2.8% and the rental vacancy rate was 13.4%.

=== 2000 census ===
As of the 2000 census, 3,828 people, 1,578 households, and 1,057 families resided in the county. The population density was four people per square mile (1.5 people/km^{2}). The 2,378 housing units averaged 3 units per square mile (1.2/km^{2}). The racial makeup of the county was 91.41% White, 3.94% Black or African American, 0.89% Native American, 0.10% Asian, 2.72% from other races, and 0.94% from two or more races. About 6.35% of the population was Hispanic or Latino of any race.

Of the 1,578 households, 24.80% had children under the age of 18 living with them, 56.70% were married couples living together, 7.50% had a female householder with no husband present, and 33.00% were not families. About 31.40% of all households were made up of individuals, and 17.00% had someone living alone who was 65 years of age or older. The average household size was 2.30 and the average family size was 2.86.

In the county, the population was distributed as 22.40% under the age of 18, 9.80% from 18 to 24, 20.60% from 25 to 44, 25.50% from 45 to 64, and 21.70% who were 65 years of age or older. The median age was 43 years. For every 100 females, there were 94.40 males. For every 100 females age 18 and over, there were 91.70 males.

The median income for a household in the county was $29,006, and for a family was $37,287. Males had a median income of $24,375 versus $18,882 for females. The per capita income for the county was $15,958. About 10.50% of families and 15.90% of the population were below the poverty line, including 20.90% of those under age 18 and 15.90% of those age 65 or over.

== Culture ==
The Harold Dow Bugbee Ranch, formerly owned by the Western artist and his second wife, Olive Vandruff Bugbee, also an artist, is located in Donley County.

U.S. Highway 287, which passes through the county, has a modern rest area. The rest area also provides sanctuary from weather, offering a tornado shelter in the main building.

== Communities ==
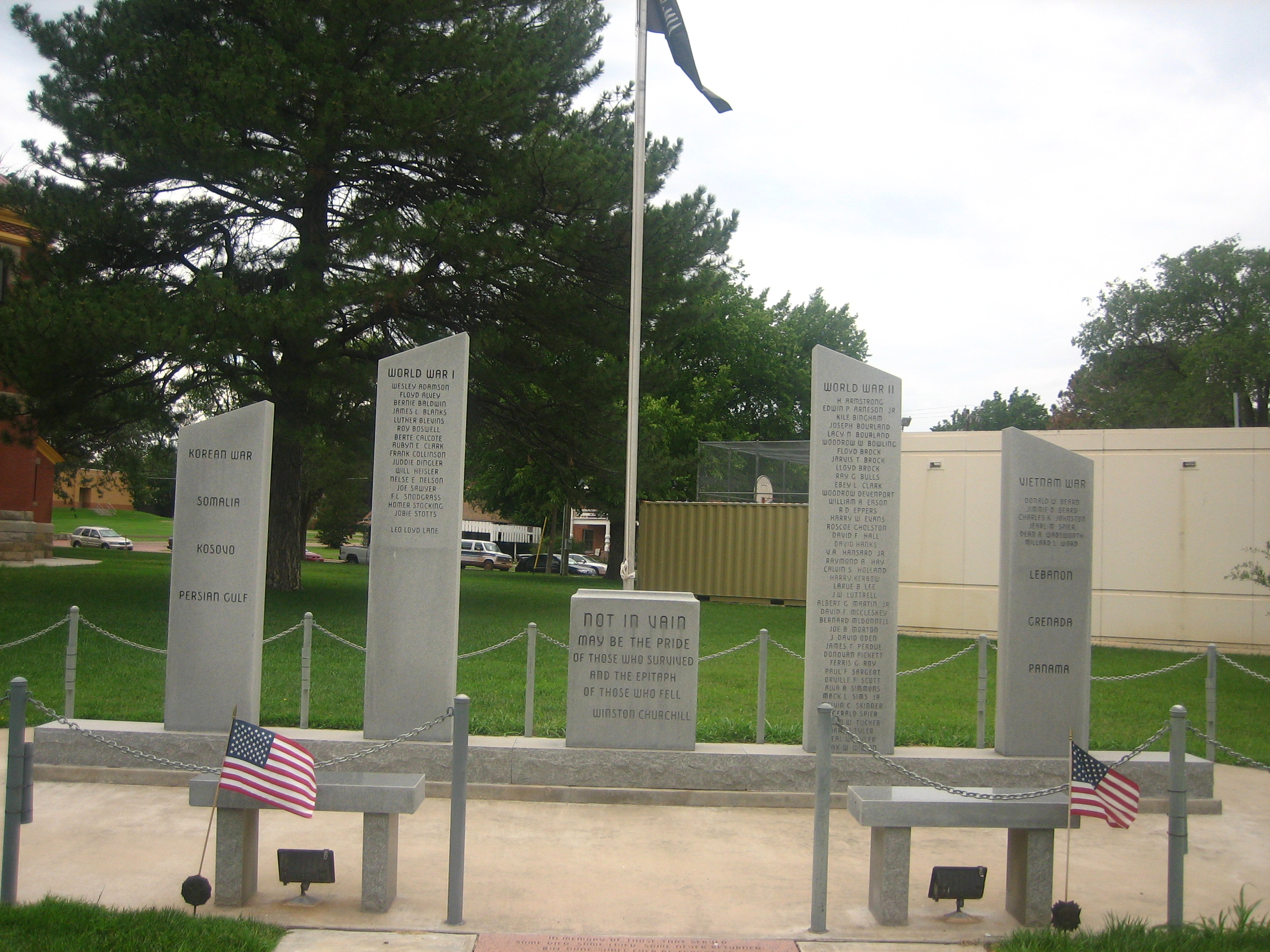
Veterans Memorial at Donley County Courthouse

=== Cities ===
- Clarendon (county seat)
- Hedley
- Howardwick

=== Census-designated place ===
- Lelia Lake

== Notable person ==
- U.S. Representative Mac Thornberry

== Politics ==
Donley County is located within District 88 of the Texas House of Representatives. Donley County is located within District 28 of the Texas Senate.

United States presidential election results for Donley County, Texas
| Year | Republican | | Democratic | | Third party(ies) | |
| Year | No. | % | No. | % | No. | % |
|---|---|---|---|---|---|---|
| 1912 | 12 | 2.74% | 387 | 88.36% | 39 | 8.90% |
| 1916 | 42 | 5.62% | 636 | 85.14% | 69 | 9.24% |
| 1920 | 206 | 20.58% | 766 | 76.52% | 29 | 2.90% |
| 1924 | 273 | 22.12% | 893 | 72.37% | 68 | 5.51% |
| 1928 | 1,092 | 68.90% | 491 | 30.98% | 2 | 0.13% |
| 1932 | 141 | 7.95% | 1,626 | 91.71% | 6 | 0.34% |
| 1936 | 133 | 7.99% | 1,513 | 90.93% | 18 | 1.08% |
| 1940 | 213 | 11.56% | 1,619 | 87.85% | 11 | 0.60% |
| 1944 | 280 | 17.93% | 1,170 | 74.90% | 112 | 7.17% |
| 1948 | 241 | 14.24% | 1,372 | 81.09% | 79 | 4.67% |
| 1952 | 1,150 | 55.93% | 900 | 43.77% | 6 | 0.29% |
| 1956 | 826 | 47.72% | 903 | 52.17% | 2 | 0.12% |
| 1960 | 951 | 55.29% | 764 | 44.42% | 5 | 0.29% |
| 1964 | 708 | 39.86% | 1,068 | 60.14% | 0 | 0.00% |
| 1968 | 816 | 50.15% | 543 | 33.37% | 268 | 16.47% |
| 1972 | 1,229 | 77.74% | 350 | 22.14% | 2 | 0.13% |
| 1976 | 704 | 39.02% | 1,095 | 60.70% | 5 | 0.28% |
| 1980 | 1,106 | 58.58% | 751 | 39.78% | 31 | 1.64% |
| 1984 | 1,297 | 70.84% | 529 | 28.89% | 5 | 0.27% |
| 1988 | 1,043 | 60.89% | 661 | 38.59% | 9 | 0.53% |
| 1992 | 893 | 51.47% | 578 | 33.31% | 264 | 15.22% |
| 1996 | 988 | 62.33% | 495 | 31.23% | 102 | 6.44% |
| 2000 | 1,333 | 77.55% | 360 | 20.94% | 26 | 1.51% |
| 2004 | 1,429 | 80.10% | 349 | 19.56% | 6 | 0.34% |
| 2008 | 1,374 | 81.30% | 291 | 17.22% | 25 | 1.48% |
| 2012 | 1,287 | 83.84% | 226 | 14.72% | 22 | 1.43% |
| 2016 | 1,225 | 83.62% | 191 | 13.04% | 49 | 3.34% |
| 2020 | 1,438 | 87.26% | 198 | 12.01% | 12 | 0.73% |
| 2024 | 1,512 | 88.32% | 174 | 10.16% | 26 | 1.52% |

United States Senate election results for Donley County, Texas1
| Year | Republican | | Democratic | | Third party(ies) | |
| Year | No. | % | No. | % | No. | % |
|---|---|---|---|---|---|---|
| 2024 | 1,453 | 87.01% | 192 | 11.50% | 25 | 1.50% |

United States Senate election results for Donley County, Texas2
| Year | Republican | | Democratic | | Third party(ies) | |
| Year | No. | % | No. | % | No. | % |
|---|---|---|---|---|---|---|
| 2020 | 1,418 | 87.26% | 181 | 11.14% | 26 | 1.60% |

Texas Gubernatorial election results for Donley County
| Year | Republican | | Democratic | | Third party(ies) | |
| Year | No. | % | No. | % | No. | % |
|---|---|---|---|---|---|---|
| 2022 | 1,084 | 90.94% | 97 | 8.14% | 11 | 0.92% |

== Education ==
School districts include:

- Clarendon Independent School District
- Groom Independent School District
- Hedley Independent School District
- McLean Independent School District
- Memphis Independent School District

The Texas Legislature assigns all of Donley County to Clarendon College.

== See also ==
- List of museums in the Texas Panhandle
- Recorded Texas Historic Landmarks in Donley County
