= Hedley, Texas =

City in Donley County, Texas, United States

- City
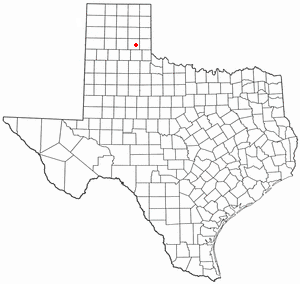
- Location of Hedley, Texas

- Coordinates: 34°52′03″N 100°39′33″W
- Country: United States
- State: Texas
- County: Donley

Area
  - Total: 0.71 sq mi (1.85 km^{2})
  - Land: 0.71 sq mi (1.85 km^{2})
  - Water: 0 sq mi (0.00 km^{2})
- Elevation: 2,615 ft (797 m)

Population (2020)
  - Total: 275
  - Density: 385/sq mi (149/km^{2})
- Time zone: UTC-6 (Central (CST))
  - Summer (DST): UTC-5 (CDT)
- ZIP code: 79237
- Area code: 806
- FIPS code: 48-33044
- GNIS feature ID: 2410732

Hedley is a city in Donley County, Texas, United States. Its population was 275 at the 2020 census, down from 329 at the 2010 census.

== Geography ==
Hedley is located in southeastern Donley County. U.S. Highway 287 passes through the community, leading northwest 14 miles (23 km) to Clarendon, the county seat, and southeast 43 miles (69 km) to Childress. Texas State Highway 203 leads east from Hedley 30 miles (48 km) to Wellington.

According to the United States Census Bureau, the city has a total area of 0.73 square miles (1.9 km^{2}), all land.

== Demographics ==
Historical population
Census	Pop.	Note	%±
1920	594		—
1930	807		35.9%
1940	637		−21.1%
1950	588		−7.7%
1960	494		−16.0%
1970	439		−11.1%
1980	380		−13.4%
1990	391		2.9%
2000	379		−3.1%
2010	329		−13.2%
2020	275		−16.4%
U.S. Decennial Census; 2020 Census

=== 2020 census ===
As of the 2020 census, Hedley had a population of 275. The median age was 44.5 years. 20.7% of residents were under the age of 18 and 25.8% of residents were 65 years of age or older. For every 100 females there were 89.7 males, and for every 100 females age 18 and over there were 92.9 males age 18 and over.

0.0% of residents lived in urban areas, while 100.0% lived in rural areas.

There were 127 households in Hedley, of which 30.7% had children under the age of 18 living in them. Of all households, 46.5% were married-couple households, 20.5% were households with a male householder and no spouse or partner present, and 30.7% were households with a female householder and no spouse or partner present. About 35.4% of all households were made up of individuals and 19.7% had someone living alone who was 65 years of age or older.

There were 180 housing units, of which 29.4% were vacant. The homeowner vacancy rate was 3.4% and the rental vacancy rate was 2.2%.

Racial composition as of the 2020 census
Race	Number	Percent
White	215	78.2%
Black or African American	4	1.5%
American Indian and Alaska Native	4	1.5%
Asian	1	0.4%
Native Hawaiian and Other Pacific Islander	0	0.0%
Some other race	24	8.7%
Two or more races	27	9.8%
Hispanic or Latino (of any race)	42	15.3%

=== 2000 census ===
As of the 2000 United States census, 379 people, 161 households, and 98 families were residing in the city. The population density was 520.1 people/sq mi (200.5/km^{2}). The 209 housing units averaged 286.8/sq mi (110.5/km^{2}). The racial makeup of the city was 91.29% White, 1.85% African American, 1.58% Native American, 5.01% from other races, and 0.26% from two or more races. Hispanics or Latinos of any race were 9.76% of the population.

Of the 161 households, 24.8% had children under the age of 18 living with them, 49.7% were married couples living together, 8.1% had a female householder with no husband present, and 39.1% were not families. About 37.9% of all households were made up of individuals, and 25.5% had someone living alone who was 65 years of age or older. The average household size was 2.35, and the average family size was 3.13.

In the city, the age distribution was 28.8% under 18, 6.9% from 18 to 24, 19.0% from 25 to 44, 21.6% from 45 to 64, and 23.7% who were 65 or older. The median age was 42 years. For every 100 females, there were 83.1 males. For every 100 females age 18 and over, there were 74.2 males.

The median income for a household in the city was $25,750, and for a family was $39,375. Males had a median income of $22,500 versus $20,208 for females. The per capita income for the city was $11,568. About 10.8% of families and 20.4% of the population were below the poverty line, including 13.0% of those under age 18 and 40.5% of those age 65 or over.

== Education ==
The city is served by the Hedley Independent School District and is home to the Hedley High School Owls.

== See also ==
- List of municipalities in Texas
