= Collingsworth County, Texas =

County in Texas, United States

- County
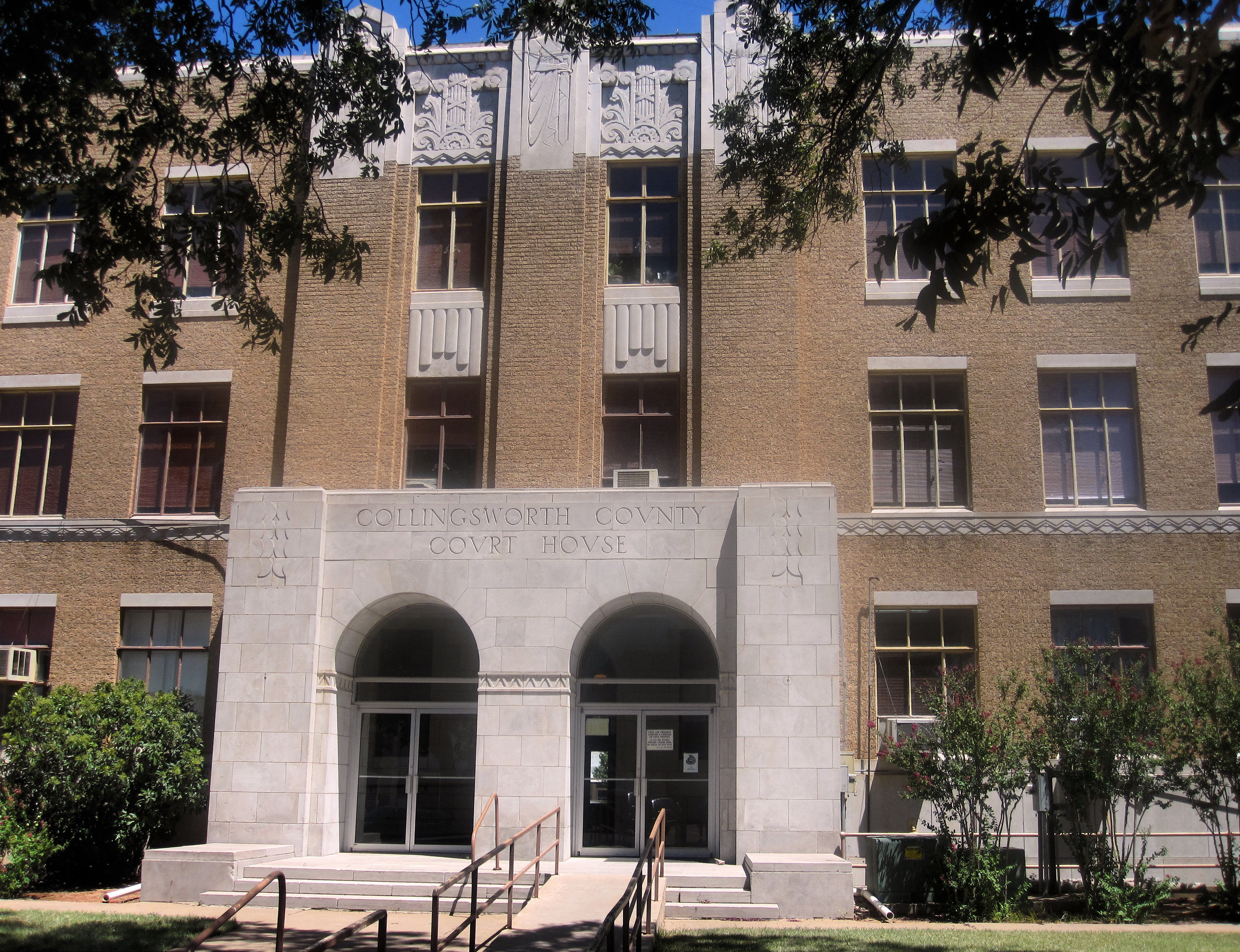
- Collingsworth County Courthouse in Wellington

- Location within the U.S. state of Texas
- Coordinates: 34°58′N 100°16′W
- Country: United States
- State: Texas
- Founded: 1890
- Named for: James Collinsworth
- Seat: Wellington
- Largest city: Wellington

Area
  - Total: 919 sq mi (2,380 km^{2})
  - Land: 918 sq mi (2,380 km^{2})
  - Water: 0.9 sq mi (2.3 km^{2}) 0.1%

Population (2020)
  - Total: 2,652
  - Estimate (2025): 2,487 ▼
  - Density: 2.89/sq mi (1.12/km^{2})
- Time zone: UTC−6 (Central)
  - Summer (DST): UTC−5 (CDT)
- Congressional district: 13th
- Website: www.co.collingsworth.tx.us

Collingsworth County is a county in the U.S. state of Texas. As of the 2020 census, its population was 2,652. Its county seat is Wellington. The county was created in 1876 and later organized in 1890. It is named for James Collinsworth, a signer of the Texas Declaration of Independence and first chief justice of the Republic of Texas (a recording error in the bill accounts for the error in spelling, which was never corrected). Collingsworth County was one of 30 prohibition, or entirely dry, counties in Texas, but a vote in 2017 changed this law.

== History ==
The county was created in 1876 from the Bexar and Young land district of Texas. Collingsworth County was organized in 1890 with Wellington as the county seat. From 1883 until 1896 the county was home to the English owned Rocking Chair Ranche.

== Geography ==
According to the U.S. Census Bureau, the county has a total area of 919 square miles (2,380 km^{2}), of which 0.9 sq mi (2.3 km^{2}) (0.1%) is covered by water.

=== Major highways ===
- U.S. Highway 83
- State Highway 203
- Loop 204

=== Adjacent counties ===
- Wheeler County (north)
- Beckham County, Oklahoma (northeast)
- Harmon County, Oklahoma (southeast)
- Childress County (south)
- Hall County (southwest)
- Donley County (west)
- Gray County (northwest)

== Demographics ==
Historical population
Census	Pop.	Note	%±
1880	6		—
1890	357		5,850.0%
1900	1,233		245.4%
1910	5,224		323.7%
1920	9,154		75.2%
1930	14,461		58.0%
1940	10,331		−28.6%
1950	9,139		−11.5%
1960	6,276		−31.3%
1970	4,755		−24.2%
1980	4,648		−2.3%
1990	3,573		−23.1%
2000	3,206		−10.3%
2010	3,057		−4.6%
2020	2,652		−13.2%
2025 (est.)	2,487	▼	−6.2%
U.S. Decennial Census; 1850–2010 2010 2020

=== Racial and ethnic composition ===
Collingsworth County, Texas – Racial and ethnic composition Note: the US Census treats Hispanic/Latino as an ethnic category. This table excludes Latinos from the racial categories and assigns them to a separate category. Hispanics/Latinos may be of any race.
Race / Ethnicity (NH = Non-Hispanic)	Pop 2000	Pop 2010	Pop 2020	% 2000	% 2010	% 2020
White alone (NH)	2,289	1,937	1,617	71.40%	63.36%	60.97%
Black or African American alone (NH)	169	122	108	5.27%	3.99%	4.07%
Native American or Alaska Native alone (NH)	46	41	23	1.43%	1.34%	0.87%
Asian alone (NH)	6	3	7	0.19%	0.10%	0.26%
Pacific Islander alone (NH)	0	0	1	0.00%	0.00%	0.04%
Other race alone (NH)	3	5	0	0.09%	0.16%	0.00%
Multiracial (NH)	38	33	64	1.19%	1.08%	2.41%
Hispanic or Latino (any race)	655	916	832	20.43%	29.96%	31.37%
Total	3,206	3,057	2,652	100.00%	100.00%	100.00%

=== 2020 census ===
As of the 2020 census, the county had a population of 2,652, with a median age of 42.2 years; 25.0% of residents were under 18 and 22.4% were 65 or older. For every 100 females, there were 91.5 males, and for every 100 females 18 and over, there were 89.2 males.

The racial makeup of the county was 72.7% White, 4.6% Black or African American, 1.4% American Indian and Alaska Native, 0.3% Asian, <0.1% Native Hawaiian and Pacific Islander, 10.1% from some other race, and 10.8% from two or more races. Hispanic or Latino residents of any race comprised 31.4% of the population.

About 0.1% of residents lived in urban areas, while almost 100.0% lived in rural areas.

Of the 1,096 households in the county, 31.6% had children under18 living in them, 49.9% were married-couple households, 16.1% were households with a male householder and no spouse or partner present, and 28.0% were households with a female householder and no spouse or partner present. About 26.7% of all households were made up of individuals, and 14.5% had someone living alone who was 65 or older.

Of the 1,481 housing units, 26.0% were vacant. Among occupied housing units, 78.2% were owner-occupied and 21.8% were renter-occupied. The homeowner vacancy rate was 2.4% and the rental vacancy rate was 16.3%.

=== 2000 census ===
As of the 2000 census, 3,206 people, 1,294 households, and 916 families were residing in the county. The population density was 4 inhabitants per square mile (1.5/km^{2}). The 1,723 housing units had an average density of 2 per square mile (0.77/km^{2}). The racial makeup of the county was 79.82% White, 5.33% Black or African American, 1.62% Native American, 0.19% Asian, 10.89% from other races, and 2.15% from two or more races. About 20.43% of the population were Hispanics or Latinos of any race.

Of the 1,294 households, 29.8% had children under 18 living with them, 57.5% were married couples living together, 9.8% had a female householder with no husband present, and 29.2% were not families. About 27.8% of all households were made up of individuals, and 17.5% had someone living alone who was 65 or older. The average household size was 2.44, and the average family size was 2.97.

In the county, the age distribution was 26.4% under 18, 6.6% from 18 to 24, 22.6% from 25 to 44, 22.5% from 45 to 64, and 22.0% who were 65 or older. The median age was 41 years. For every 100 females, there were 93.0 males. For every 100 females 18 and over, there were 88.0 males.

The median income for a household in the county was $25,438 and for a family was $33,323. Males had a median income of $24,808 versus $17,679 for females. The per capita income for the county was $15,318. About 14.8% of families and 18.7% of the population were below the poverty line, including 27.2% of those under 18 and 16.4% of those 65 or over.

== Communities ==
=== City ===
- Wellington (county seat)

=== Town ===
- Dodson

=== Census-designated places ===
- Quail
- Samnorwood

=== Unincorporated communities ===
- Dozier
- Lutie

=== Ghost towns ===
- Aberdeen
- Fresno
- Marilla
- New Loco
- Rolla
- Swearingen

== Politics ==
Collingsworth County is located within District 88 of the Texas House of Representatives. Collinsworth County is located within District 28 of the Texas Senate.

United States presidential election results for Collingsworth County, Texas
Year	Republican		Democratic		Third party(ies)	
Year	No.	%	No.	%	No.	%
1912	14	3.08%	414	90.99%	27	5.93%
1916	31	4.56%	589	86.62%	60	8.82%
1920	307	30.49%	640	63.56%	60	5.96%
1924	234	23.68%	731	73.99%	23	2.33%
1928	1,179	65.98%	608	34.02%	0	0.00%
1932	115	6.12%	1,753	93.29%	11	0.59%
1936	158	7.27%	2,012	92.63%	2	0.09%
1940	307	13.09%	2,034	86.70%	5	0.21%
1944	261	12.07%	1,725	79.79%	176	8.14%
1948	198	9.48%	1,779	85.16%	112	5.36%
1952	1,334	50.21%	1,321	49.72%	2	0.08%
1956	815	39.66%	1,229	59.81%	11	0.54%
1960	1,084	60.83%	691	38.78%	7	0.39%
1964	724	38.68%	1,145	61.16%	3	0.16%
1968	712	36.83%	746	38.59%	475	24.57%
1972	1,250	71.39%	501	28.61%	0	0.00%
1976	629	34.87%	1,169	64.80%	6	0.33%
1980	1,020	55.11%	798	43.11%	33	1.78%
1984	1,396	64.96%	742	34.53%	11	0.51%
1988	872	51.81%	809	48.07%	2	0.12%
1992	697	43.56%	635	39.69%	268	16.75%
1996	729	50.94%	581	40.60%	121	8.46%
2000	974	68.83%	429	30.32%	12	0.85%
2004	1,051	75.18%	346	24.75%	1	0.07%
2008	943	78.91%	234	19.58%	18	1.51%
2012	962	83.65%	177	15.39%	11	0.96%
2016	983	85.03%	145	12.54%	28	2.42%
2020	1,048	86.04%	155	12.73%	15	1.23%
2024	1,066	88.76%	135	11.24%	0	0.00%

United States Senate election results for Collingsworth County, Texas1
Year	Republican		Democratic		Third party(ies)	
Year	No.	%	No.	%	No.	%
2024	1,039	87.98%	141	11.94%	1	0.08%

United States Senate election results for Collingsworth County, Texas2
Year	Republican		Democratic		Third party(ies)	
Year	No.	%	No.	%	No.	%
2020	1,032	86.58%	145	12.16%	15	1.26%

Texas Gubernatorial election results for Collingsworth County
Year	Republican		Democratic		Third party(ies)	
Year	No.	%	No.	%	No.	%
2022	845	91.35%	75	8.11%	5	0.54%

== See also ==
- List of museums in the Texas Panhandle
- National Register of Historic Places listings in Collingsworth County, Texas
- Recorded Texas Historic Landmarks in Collingsworth County
