= Wellington, Texas =

- City
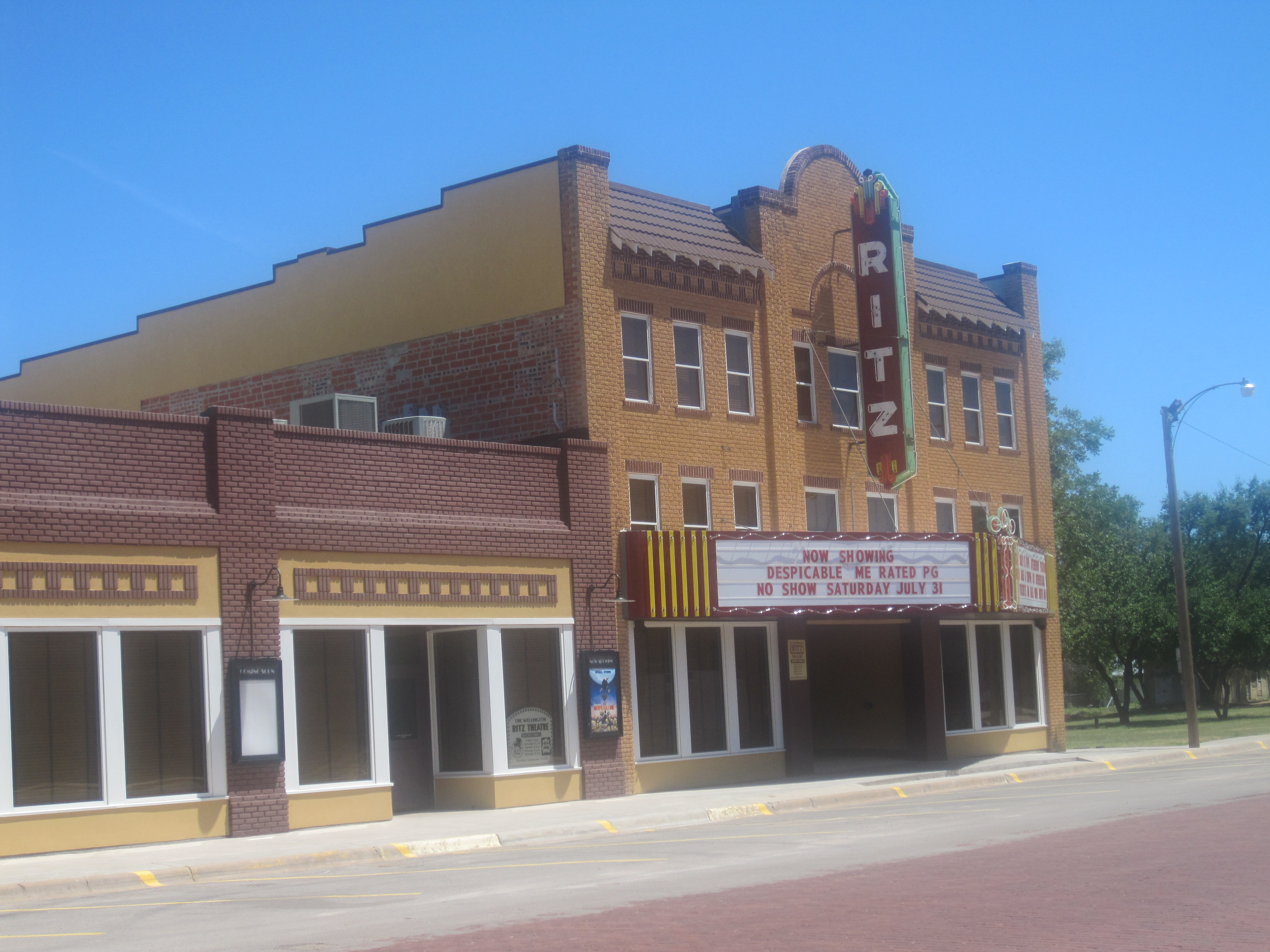
- The restored Historic Ritz Theatre in Wellington. In 2011, the theatre was among 100 national finalists in the "This Place Matters" competition of the National Trust for Historic Preservation.

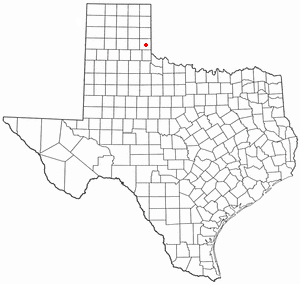
- Location of Wellington, Texas

- Coordinates: 34°51′14″N 100°12′50″W
- Country: United States
- State: Texas
- County: Collingsworth

Area
  - Total: 1.38 sq mi (3.57 km^{2})
  - Land: 1.38 sq mi (3.57 km^{2})
  - Water: 0 sq mi (0.00 km^{2})
- Elevation: 2,034 ft (620 m)

Population (2020)
  - Total: 1,896
  - Density: 1,380/sq mi (531/km^{2})
- Time zone: UTC-6 (Central (CST))
  - Summer (DST): UTC-5 (CDT)
- ZIP code: 79095
- Area code: 806
- FIPS code: 48-77152
- GNIS feature ID: 2412207
- Website: http://www.wellingtontx.com/

Wellington is a city in and the county seat of Collingsworth County, Texas, United States. Its population was 1,896 at the 2020 census.

== History ==
Sometime in 1889 or 1890, as smaller ranches and farmlands were being purchased, Ernest Theodore O'Neil, his brother-in-law John Simon McConnell, and John W. Swearingen, together had purchased the land where the town currently sits, for $5.00 per acre. Subsequently, O'Neil, who originally owned a fourth of the section of the township, purchased the interests of McConnell and Swearingen and retained sole ownership of the land. The 1890 census showed 357 inhabitants across the county, with 89 ranches and farms and 335 acres (1.36 km^{2}) of land in cultivation. In August 1890, a petition was circulated to organize the county, choose a county seat, and elect county officers. Two potential townships were proposed: Wellington and Pearl. The proposed town of Wellington was located on the land owned by Ernest T. O'Neil, who was promoting this location and had been given its proposed name by his wife, Matilda Anna Elisabeth "Lizzie" O'Neil, who greatly admired the Duke of Wellington, hero of the Battle of Waterloo. The alternate and proposed town of Pearl was located several miles north of Wellington.

In September 1890, the vote was held and Wellington was selected for the seat of the newly organized county of Collingsworth. In 1891, the new city, laid out by Ernest T. O'Neil, was surveyed and platted, and the first postal service and postmaster, Carrie M. Barton, was established on January 9, 1891. Construction of a courthouse began in 1893, and contractor J. A. White built the courthouse of locally made bricks. With the extra materials left over from the courthouse, J. A. White erected a mercantile store for Ernest T. O'Neil. This became the first mercantile store and commercial building in Wellington, prior to the opening of a two-story hotel by O'Neil. Later O'Neil organized the first bank, was active in all phases of the county's growth and development, and served as postmaster from August 22, 1895 to December 11, 1897.

Early in the early 20th century, Wellington was connected through Altus, Oklahoma, with Wichita Falls, Texas, through the Wichita Falls and Wellington Railway, one of the properties of industrialist Joseph A. Kemp of Wichita Falls. In 1914, this route was leased by the since-defunct Missouri–Kansas–Texas Railroad. The Wellington-to-Altus segment was abandoned in 1958.

The first time Bonnie Parker and Clyde Barrow made The New York Times newspaper was their incident at the Prichard farm. Bonnie is referenced as a "woman companion", and the perpetrators were Clyde Barrow and his brother, whose name is given as Icy. With the location as "Wellington, Texas", the story tells of their wrecking their car, terrorizing a family and shooting the daughter-in-law (but actually their daughter), and kidnapping two law enforcement officers and taking them in their car near Erick, Oklahoma, where the two kidnapped men were tied to a tree with barbed wire cut from a fence. They freed themselves and alerted local law enforcement, but the trail had gone cold.

== Geography ==
Wellington is located in southern Collingsworth County. U.S. Route 83 runs along the eastern edge of the city, leading north 26 miles (42 km) to Shamrock and Interstate 40, and south 31 miles (50 km) to Childress. Texas State Highway 203 leads east 13 miles (21 km) to the Oklahoma border and west 14 miles (23 km) to Quail.

According to the United States Census Bureau, Wellington has a total area of 1.4 square miles (3.5 km^{2}), all land.

=== Climate ===
According to the Köppen climate classification, Wellington has a semiarid climate, BSk on climate maps.

Climate data for Wellington, Texas (1991–2020)
Month	Jan	Feb	Mar	Apr	May	Jun	Jul	Aug	Sep	Oct	Nov	Dec	Year
Mean daily maximum °F (°C)	56.2 (13.4)	60.1 (15.6)	70.2 (21.2)	78.8 (26.0)	86.6 (30.3)	94.6 (34.8)	98.7 (37.1)	97.6 (36.4)	90.1 (32.3)	78.7 (25.9)	66.2 (19.0)	56.3 (13.5)	77.8 (25.5)
Daily mean °F (°C)	42.1 (5.6)	45.7 (7.6)	54.6 (12.6)	63.1 (17.3)	71.9 (22.2)	80.5 (26.9)	84.4 (29.1)	83.3 (28.5)	75.9 (24.4)	64.1 (17.8)	51.9 (11.1)	43.1 (6.2)	63.4 (17.4)
Mean daily minimum °F (°C)	27.9 (−2.3)	31.3 (−0.4)	38.9 (3.8)	47.4 (8.6)	57.3 (14.1)	66.4 (19.1)	70.1 (21.2)	69.1 (20.6)	61.8 (16.6)	49.6 (9.8)	37.6 (3.1)	30.0 (−1.1)	49.0 (9.4)
Average precipitation inches (mm)	0.73 (19)	0.86 (22)	1.34 (34)	1.86 (47)	3.24 (82)	3.32 (84)	2.15 (55)	1.92 (49)	2.35 (60)	2.25 (57)	1.19 (30)	0.87 (22)	22.08 (561)
Average snowfall inches (cm)	1.3 (3.3)	0.8 (2.0)	0.1 (0.25)	0.0 (0.0)	0.0 (0.0)	0.0 (0.0)	0.0 (0.0)	0.0 (0.0)	0.0 (0.0)	0.0 (0.0)	0.7 (1.8)	1.1 (2.8)	4 (10.15)
Source: NOAA

== Demographics ==
Historical population
Census	Pop.	Note	%±
1910	576		—
1920	1,968		241.7%
1930	3,570		81.4%
1940	3,308		−7.3%
1950	3,676		11.1%
1960	3,137		−14.7%
1970	2,884		−8.1%
1980	3,043		5.5%
1990	2,456		−19.3%
2000	2,275		−7.4%
2010	2,189		−3.8%
2020	1,896		−13.4%
U.S. Decennial Census

=== 2020 census ===
As of the 2020 census, Wellington had a population of 1,896 with 784 households and 563 families residing in the city, and the median age was 39.0 years.

About 26.7% of residents were under 18 and 19.9% were 65 or older. For every 100 females there were 90.2 males, and for every 100 females age 18 and over there were 86.7 males age 18 and over.

None of the residents lived in urban areas, while all lived in rural areas.

Of the 784 households, 33.0% had children under 18 living in them, 44.3% were married-couple households, 17.7% were households with a male householder and no spouse or partner present, and 31.8% were households with a female householder and no spouse or partner present. About 28.2% of all households were made up of individuals, and 14.6% had someone living alone who was 65 or older. The 976 housing units were 19.7% vacant. The homeowner vacancy rate was 2.8%, and the rental vacancy rate was 15.9%.

Racial composition as of the 2020 census
Race	Number	Percent
White	1,296	68.4%
Black or African American	114	6.0%
American Indian and Alaska Native	29	1.5%
Asian	8	0.4%
Native Hawaiian and other Pacific Islander	0	0.0%
Some other race	221	11.7%
Two or more races	228	12.0%
Hispanic or Latino (of any race)	703	37.1%

=== 2000 census ===
As of the 2000 census, 2,275 people, 906 households, and 615 families were residing in the city. The population density was 1,670.4 inhabitants per square mile (644.9/km^{2}). The 1,162 housing units had an average density of 853.2 per square mile (329.4/km^{2}). The racial makeup of the city was 75.87% White, 6.95% African American, 1.05% Native American, 0.22% Asian, 13.23% from other races, and 2.68% from two or more races. Hispanics or Latinos of any race were 25.10% of the population.

Of the 906 households, 31.5% had children under 18 living with them, 52.5% were married couples living together, 11.4% had a female householder with no husband present, and 32.1% were not families. About 30.7% of all households were made up of individuals, and 20.0% had someone living alone who was 65 or older. The average household size was 2.45, and the average family size was 3.08.

In the city, the age distribution was 28.4% under 18, 6.9% from 18 to 24, 23.5% from 25 to 44, 19.5% from 45 to 64, and 21.8% who were 65 or older. The median age was 38 years. For every 100 females, there were 89.6 males. For every 100 females 18 and over, there were 82.5 males.

The median income for a household in the city was $23,260 and for a family was $30,257. Males had a median income of $25,143 versus $15,368 for females. The per capita income for the city was $13,997. About 17.4% of families and 22.5% of the population were below the poverty line, including 32.2% of those under 18 and 20.1% of those 65 or over.

== Education ==
Public education in the city of Wellington is provided by the Wellington Independent School District and is home to the Wellington Skyrockets

== Notable people ==
- John Aaron, NASA engineer (born here and reared in Oklahoma) who played an important roles in both the Apollo 12 and Apollo 13 Moon missions
- Loyd Colson, former Major League Baseball pitcher
- Jan Fortune (born 1892), journalist and writer; first girl born in town
- Glen D. Hardin, piano player and arranger with the TCB Band
- Bob O'Rear, seventh Microsoft-employee and multimillionaire
- Jimmy Webb, Grammy Award-winning songwriter, lived in Wellington in the 1950s
- Tex Winter, former college and NBA head coach who created the triangle offense in basketball

== Gallery ==
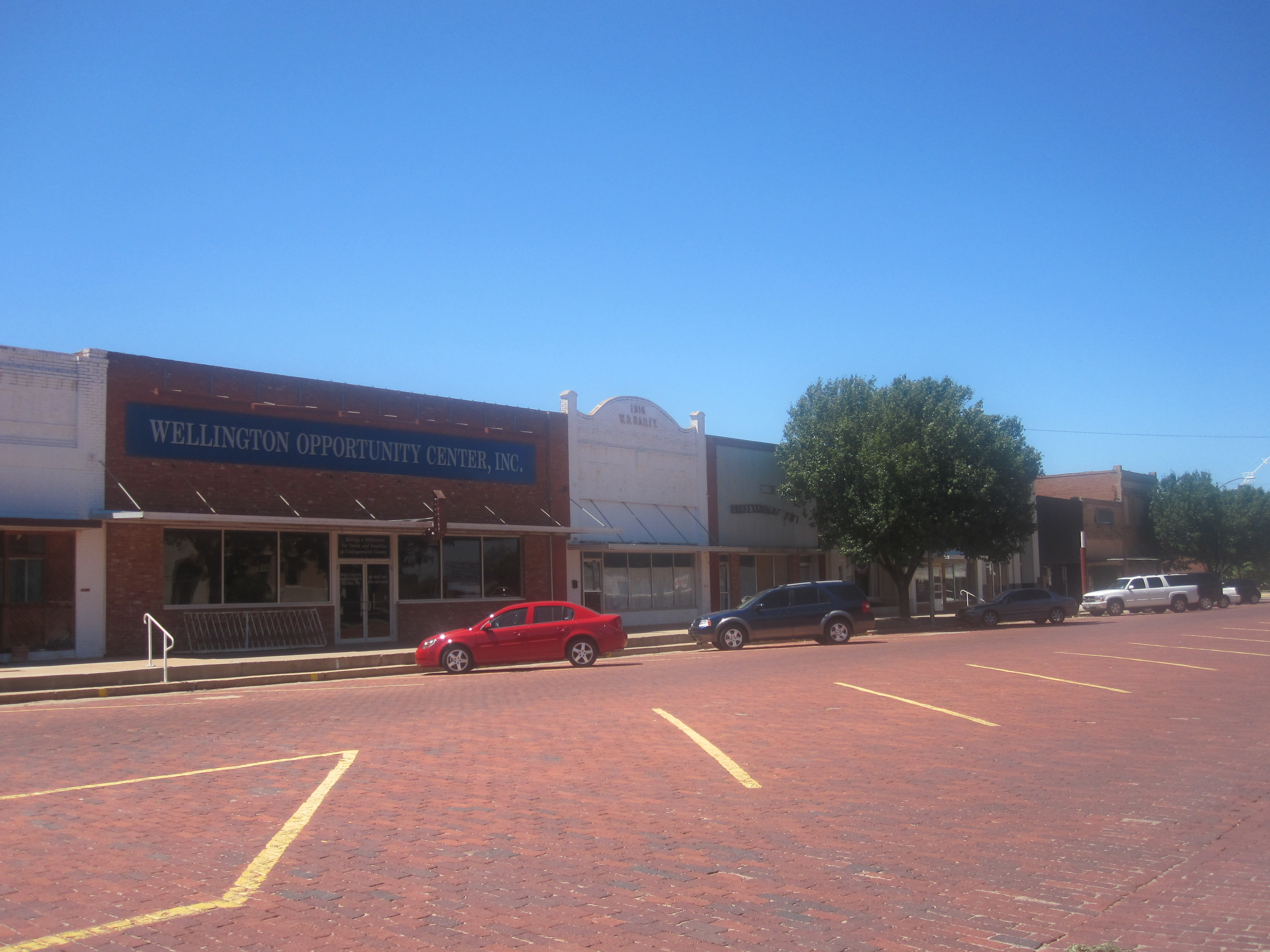
Downtown Wellington across from the Collingsworth County Courthouse; the Collingsworth County Historical Museum and Art Center is located behind the tree.

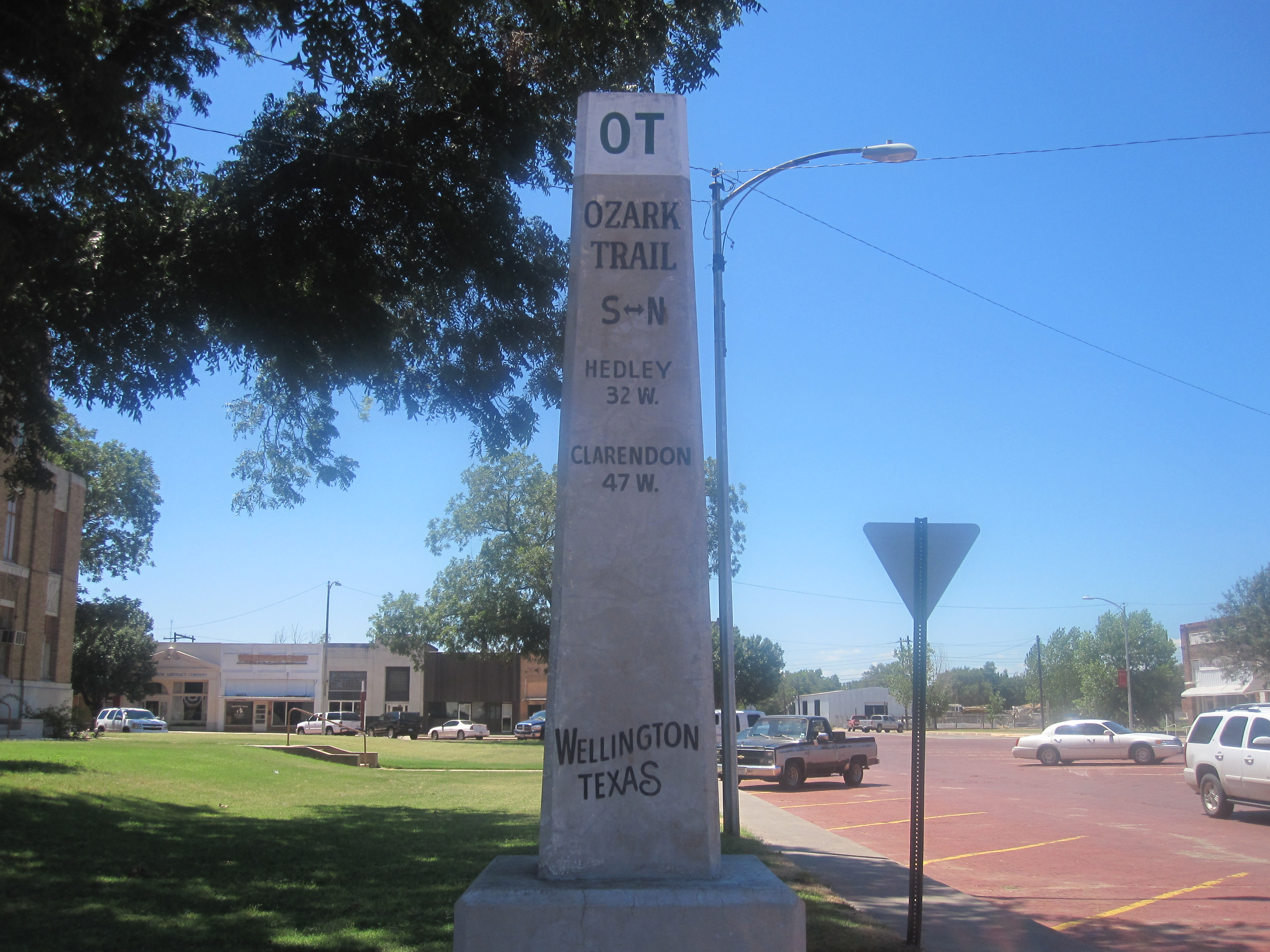
The Ozark Trail runs through parts of the Texas Panhandle, including Wellington.

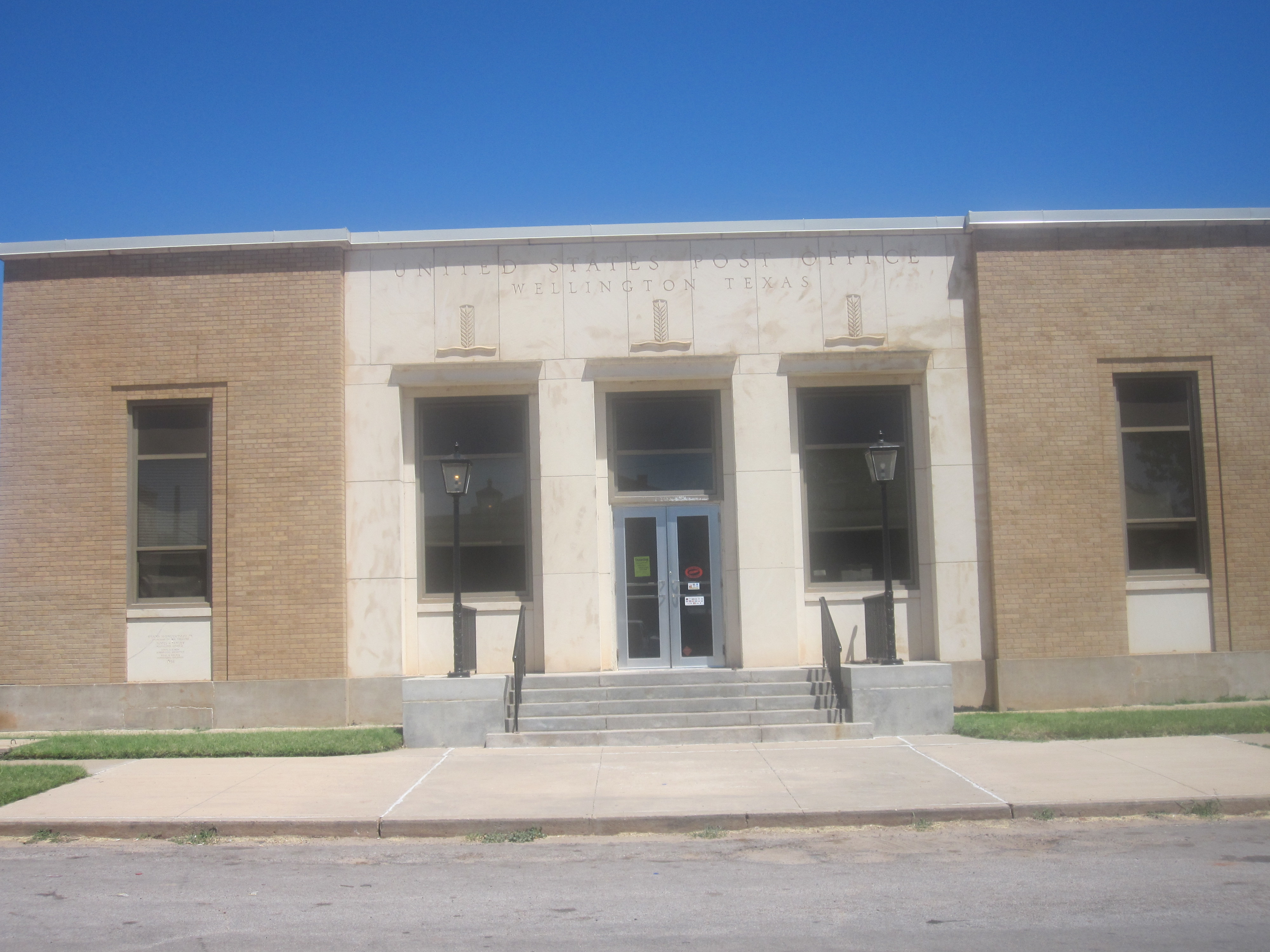
U.S. Post Office in Wellington

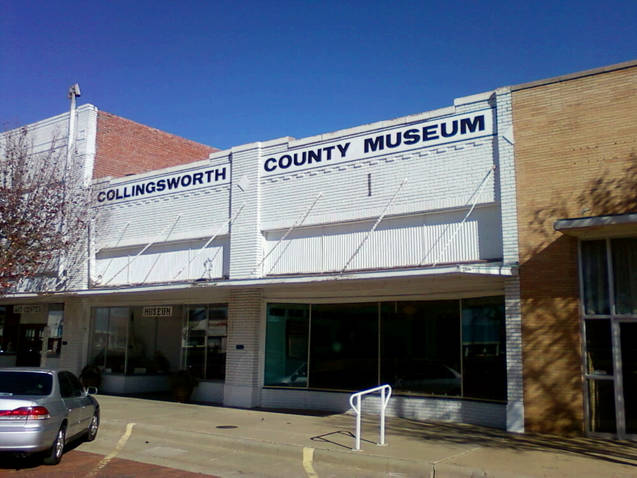
Collingsworth County Museum

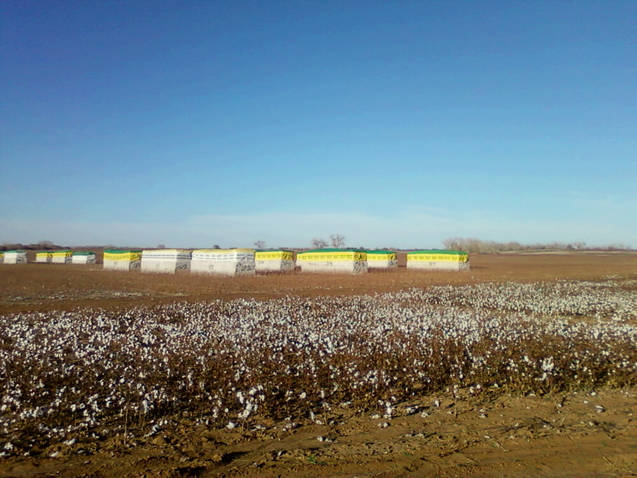
Cotton bales near Wellington

== See also ==
- Greenbelt Electric Cooperative
