= List of United States tornadoes in March 2007 =

This is a list of all tornadoes that were confirmed by local offices of the National Weather Service in the United States in March 2007.

== United States Yearly Total ==
Confirmed tornadoes by Enhanced Fujita rating
EFU	EF0	EF1	EF2	EF3	EF4	EF5	Total
0	675	298	91	27	4	1	1,096

- Note: January tornadoes were rated using the old Fujita scale, but are included in the chart above by matching the F rating to the related EF scale rating.

== March ==
Confirmed tornadoes by Enhanced Fujita rating
EFU	EF0	EF1	EF2	EF3	EF4	EF5	Total
0	96	44	22	8	2	0	172

=== March 1 event ===
List of confirmed tornadoes – Thursday, March 1, 2007 (Note: All dates are based on the local time zone where the tornado touched down; however, all times are in Coordinated Universal Time for consistency.)
EF#	Location	County / Parish	State	Start Coord.	Time (UTC)	Path length	Max width	Summary
EF0	N of Madison	Monroe	MO	39.523°N 92.2246°W	07:30–07:35	2.07 mi (3.33 km)	50 yd (46 m)	An intermittent tornado destroyed a machine shed, scattering debris up to 300 yards (270 m) away. Flying debris damaged another machine shed and the roof of a farmhouse. Farther along the tornado's track, a house sustained slight roof damage, and several tree limbs and pine trees were downed.
EF1	ESE of Maud	Monroe	MO	39.6024°N 92.1498°W	07:40–07:45	3.36 mi (5.41 km)	60 yd (55 m)	The same supercell that produced the previous tornado produced another intermittent tornado that destroyed a machine shed and damaged a pole barn. Debris from the machine shed was scattered up to 0.5 miles (0.80 km) away. Several trees were downed, and four cows were killed by flying debris.
EF1	N of Granville to ESE of Shelbina	Monroe, Shelby	MO	39.5988°N 92.1°W	07:43–07:49	8.62 mi (13.87 km)	100 yd (91 m)	This was the third tornado produced by the Monroe County supercell. A metal shed, a pole barn, and a house were damaged before the tornado moved northeast where it downed several trees and damaged numerous structures and automobiles. A house lost parts of its roof and walls, and a mobile home was flipped over. The tornado continued to the northeast where it partially destroyed a shed and completely destroyed a pole barn. Many cedar trees were downed, and another pole barn sustained minor roof and siding damage. The tornado downed more trees and power poles before moving into Shelby County, where it destroyed another pole barn before dissipating.
EF0	E of Yocum	Carroll	AR	36.4193°N 93.3919°W	10:28–10:30	2 mi (3.2 km)	50 yd (46 m)	Several trees were snapped, and a chicken house was damaged.
EF3	SW of Caulfield to SW of West Plains	Ozark, Howell	MO	36.59°N 92.15°W	12:24–12:43	15 mi (24 km)	200 yd (180 m)	1 death – Trees and power lines were downed at EF1 intensity in Ozark County; then, the tornado quickly moved into Howell County where it rapidly intensified. As it directly struck the town of Caulfield, it destroyed numerous structures and some farms in the area as well as severely damaging a gas station. A person was killed when their mobile home was destroyed. Four other people reportedly suffered injuries during the same incident, but this was not officially counted.
EF0	SE of Archie	Catahoula	LA	37.4389°N 89.3036°W	15:50–15:51	0.5 mi (0.80 km)	50 yd (46 m)	A brief tornado remained in a wooded area and did not cause damage.
EF0	W of Jonesboro	Union	IL	37.4389°N 89.3036°W	16:45–16:47	1.8 mi (2.9 km)	150 yd (140 m)	About 15 to 20 houses suffered minor damage. Many trees were either uprooted or toppled, including one tree that landed on a house and trapped its resident.
EF0	NNW of Spring Hill	Santa Rosa	FL	30.77°N 86.94°W	17:20–17:22	0.5 mi (0.80 km)	30 yd (27 m)	A weak tornado briefly touched down in a forest, downing several trees and power lines.
EF1	E of Benton to ESE of Midway	Yazoo	MS	32.7993°N 90.2335°W	17:58–18:05	6.47 mi (10.41 km)	100 yd (91 m)	Many trees and power lines were downed, and a barn suffered roof damage.
EF0	NNW of Industry	Butler	AL	31.63°N 96.64°W	18:05–18:10	3.15 mi (5.07 km)	30 yd (27 m)	Several trees were blown down, and a tractor-trailer was blown off SR 106.
EF4	NW of Millers Ferry to SW of Cahaba	Wilcox, Dallas	AL	32.12°N 87.4087°W	18:27–18:48	18.32 mi (29.48 km)	500 yd (460 m)	1 death – In Wilcox County, this violent wedge tornado touched down near the William "Bill" Dannelly Reservoir. It heavily damaged or destroyed 40 houses in a recreational and residential area, scattering the debris as far as 2 miles (3.2 km) away. Most of these residences were mobile homes, but four houses were also destroyed, two of which were leveled. One man was killed when he was thrown from his mobile home and two others were injured in similar fashion. In addition, several vehicles were tossed around and damaged. The tornado quickly weakened to EF0-EF1 intensity and caused damage to some houses and hunting camps. In Dallas County, the tornado regained EF2 intensity near the Five Points community and damaged 27 houses, two of which were completely destroyed. At least six outbuildings were also damaged, and numerous trees and power lines were either snapped off or uprooted along the path. Winds from this tornado were estimated at 185 mph (298 km/h), making it the strongest tornado of the outbreak.
EF0	Elwin	Macon	IL	39.7749°N 88.9867°W	18:47–18:48	1 mi (1.6 km)	30 yd (27 m)	A front porch and church's chimney were damaged. Many trees were downed, one of which fell across three vehicles. One person suffered minor injuries when they were blown to the ground.
EF4	Enterprise	Coffee, Dale	AL	31.2836°N 85.9191°W	19:08–19:18	10.33 mi (16.62 km)	500 yd (460 m)	9 deaths – See section on this tornado – This was the first tornado to cause deaths at a school since 1993. Fifty other people were injured.
EF1	SW of Echo, AL to S of Hatcher, GA	Dale (AL), Henry (AL), Clay (GA), Quitman (GA)	AL, GA	31.4493°N 85.506°W	19:48–20:38	37.94 mi (61.06 km)	150 yd (140 m)	This long-tracked tornado touched down in Dale County where 24 mobile homes were damaged and five more were destroyed. Four people were injured in one of the mobile homes. The tornado also destroyed 18 chicken houses, killing around 140,000 chickens. Numerous trees and utility poles were downed as well. The tornado's path missed the Ft Rucker, Alabama WSR-88D RDA site by less than 0.25 miles (0.40 km) The tornado moved into Henry County, where it caused sporadic tree damage. In the town of Bethlehem, 51 mobile homes were damaged, an additional 28 were destroyed, and two more people were injured in one of these mobile homes. A "semi-truck" was overturned before the tornado entered Otho where the it destroyed 14 houses and damaged 27 others. The tornado weakened as it crossed the state line into Clay County, Georgia near Lake Eufaula where it damaged several more houses and downed more trees with EF0 intensity. It downed a few more trees in Quitman County before lifting.
EF1	Northwestern Elkton	Todd	KY	36.8251°N 87.1564°W	20:20–20:21	0.2 mi (0.32 km)	30 yd (27 m)	This tornado struck a neighborhood in the northwest side of Elkton where it blew the roofs off a house, mobile home, and storage facility. A chain-link fence and several trees were downed as well.
EF2	Sandy Ridge to NW of Mathews	Lowndes, Montgomery	AL	32.0275°N 86.4486°W	20:48–21:26	24.55 mi (39.51 km)	600 yd (550 m)	A tornado touched down in Lowndes County and quickly intensified to EF2 strength, damaging several structures, downing trees, and injuring four people. As it moved into Montgomery County, it grew wider and started a path of damage and destruction through the rural communities of Davenport, Fleta, Ada, and Sprague. Ten automobiles were significantly damaged, with two people injured when one of those cars was thrown 100 yards (91 m) from the road. Five large chicken houses were obliterated near Davenport, and at least 23 barns and outbuildings sustained damage. One high-voltage power transmission line was totally destroyed, and 39 houses were damaged, three of which were destroyed. Fourteen grain silos were also destroyed, with four of them thrown up to 0.5 miles (0.80 km) away from where they were anchored. Hundreds of trees were snapped and uprooted along the path.
EF1	S of Bluff to S of Glen Allen	Fayette	AL	33.81°N 87.9°E	20:59–21:08	11.22 mi (18.06 km)	150 yd (140 m)	Several houses and storage buildings were damaged, and many trees were downed as well.
EF1	N of Samantha	Tuscaloosa	AL	33.4275°N 87.6416°W	21:00–21:05	3.73 mi (6.00 km)	100 yd (91 m)	Numerous trees were uprooted, and a brick house lost its roof. The storm was initially confirmed as two different tornado tracks but revised as a single tornado following an aerial survey.
EF1	Richland	Stewart	GA	32.0749°N 84.676°W	21:11–21:13	1.5 mi (2.4 km)	250 yd (230 m)	A weak but damaging tornado moved directly through downtown Richland. At least 50 houses and businesses suffered varying degrees of damage. A frail wooden commercial building and a church were destroyed. One mobile home was shifted off its foundation, a tractor-trailer was lifted and dropped, and trees and power lines were downed.
EF1	NNE of Eufaula	Barbour	AL	31.9830°N 85.1300°W	21:12–21:15	2.4 mi (3.9 km)	75 yd (69 m)	A tornado moved through Lakepoint State Park, where at least 100 pine trees were snapped and several power lines were downed.
EF2	W of Arley to NW of Crane Hill	Winston, Cullman	AL	34.08°N 87.25°W	21:45–21:57	9.62 mi (15.48 km)	100 yd (91 m)	Several houses and barns were damaged along the path. One chicken house was destroyed, and two others sustained major damage. Numerous trees were either uprooted or snapped.
EF1	Adamsville	Jefferson	AL	33.5774°N 86.9515°W	22:06–22:08	0.9 mi (1.4 km)	400 yd (370 m)	Dozens of trees were either uprooted or snapped. Many trees fell on houses and caused significant structural damage. One house had a large portion of its roof lifted off.
EF2	SE of Butler to Reynolds	Taylor	GA	32.4893°N 84.1564°W	22:29–22:40	7.69 mi (12.38 km)	448 yd (410 m)	1 death – Near the town of Potterville, this large tornado destroyed two mobile homes, damaged others, and caused extensive damage to trees and power lines. One person was killed and four others injured in this area. The tornado weakened as it moved northeastward but still downed trees and caused minor roof damage to several houses in Reynolds.
EF3	E of Knoxville to SE of Lizella	Crawford, Bibb	GA	32.72°N 83.9313°W	22:34–22:47	9.72 mi (15.64 km)	448 yd (410 m)	Several houses and outbuildings were damaged or destroyed along Sandy Point Road, and many trees were downed in Crawford County; in Bibb County, one house was damaged, and several trees and power lines were downed. Nine people reported injuries.
EF1	Zenith to NW of Byron	Crawford	GA	32.6099°N 83.9704°W	22:49–23:03	11.86 mi (19.09 km)	100 yd (91 m)	Numerous trees were downed, a number of outbuildings were damaged or destroyed, and several houses sustained minor structural damage.
EF0	W of Payne	Bibb	GA	32.87°N 83.8119°W	22:51–22:54	2.55 mi (4.10 km)	100 yd (91 m)	A gas station, the roof of a house, and several signs and traffic signals were all damaged. Trees and power lines were damaged or downed.
EF2	NW of Phenix City, AL to W of Midland, GA	Russell (AL), Lee (AL), Muscogee (GA)	AL, GA	32.5098°N 85.0505°W	23:27–23:41	10.3 mi (16.6 km)	300 yd (270 m)	Trees were damaged with EF0 intensity in Russell County before the tornado strengthened to EF1 intensity as it crossed into Lee County; there, at least 25 houses suffered minor shingle, window, or structural damage. Many trees were downed, several of which fell onto houses in multiple neighborhoods. The tornado crossed the Chattahoochee River into Georgia, where it first struck the northwestern section of Columbus; from there, it caused EF2 damage while moving through Green Island Hills, Brookstone, Autumn Ridge, Hamilton Station, and along Old Moon Road. Multiple houses and commercial buildings suffered major damage, windows were blown out of buildings, large air conditioning units were tossed around, and many signs and power poles were downed. A Hawthorn Suites was destroyed from roof and water damage, a Ramada Inn under construction sustained major damage, and a Holiday Inn Express only received minor damage. A bowling alley had its roof torn off, and several churches sustained heavy damage. Hundreds of trees were downed along the track, with a number of them falling onto cars. One person was injured.
EF1	NW of Griswoldville to SW of James	Jones	GA	32.9007°N 83.5165°W	23:30–23:35	3.62 mi (5.83 km)	150 yd (140 m)	Many trees were downed, some of which fell onto houses. Several commercial and residential structures suffered varying degrees of damage, and a railroad crossing arm and its support pole were knocked over.
EF0	ENE of James	Jones	GA	32.9899°N 83.4102°W	23:44–23:45	0.02 mi (0.032 km)	50 yd (46 m)	A very brief tornado, that came from the same cell that produced the first Jones County tornado, downed about two dozen trees in less than one minute.
EF1	S of Ryan	Shelby	AL	33.1577°N 86.8592°W	23:56–23:57	0.65 mi (1.05 km)	100 yd (91 m)	At least 15 large pine trees were snapped. One house and a barn both sustained significant roof damage.
EF1	NE of Baughville to WNW of Talbotton	Talbot	GA	32.68°N 84.6588°W	00:00–00:05	4.1 mi (6.6 km)	100 yd (91 m)	Several houses suffered minor roof damage, and five outbuildings and one mobile home were destroyed. A porch was destroyed at a house, and a feed store and barn were damaged. Numerous trees were downed as well.
EF2	ENE of Warrenton	Warren, McDuffie	GA	33.4221°N 82.606°W	01:08–01:24	11.74 mi (18.89 km)	448 yd (410 m)	In Warren County, a school and several mobile homes were damaged, and another mobile home was destroyed. Eight houses received major damage, 13 were moderately damaged, and 17 others sustained minor damage before the tornado crossed into McDuffie County. After crossing the county line, the tornado moved directly through Thomson, downing numerous trees and power lines; in addition, several vehicles, houses, and a private school sustained moderate or major damage. Three people were injured in Warren County.
EF3	SE of Weston to Americus to SSW of Oglethorpe	Webster, Sumter, Macon	GA	31.9217°N 84.5513°W	02:00–02:40	43.2 mi (69.5 km)	1,790 yd (1,640 m)	2 deaths – See section on this tornado – At least 11 people were injured.
EF0	SW of Cary	Bleckley	GA	32.5467°N 83.2869°W	03:30–03:32	1.38 mi (2.22 km)	448 yd (410 m)	A short-lived tornado destroyed several outbuildings and the back porch of a business. It also damaged the porches of several other structures and the roofs of three houses. In addition, numerous trees were downed.
EF2	NE of Allentown to ESE of Toomsboro	Wilkinson	GA	32.6551°N 83.1514°W	03:40–03:53	13.27 mi (21.36 km)	895 yd (818 m)	A large tornado moved through mostly rural areas. One house suffered minor to moderate damage, and many trees and power lines were downed.
EF1	W of Mauk	Marion	GA	32.4901°N 84.5103°W	03:52–03:54	2.51 mi (4.04 km)	100 yd (91 m)	One barn was destroyed, and a mobile home was shifted off its foundation. The roofs of a house and barn were both damaged. Numerous trees and fences were downed.
EF2	W of Newton to N of Bridgeboro	Baker, Mitchell, Dougherty, Worth	GA	31.32°N 84.4485°W	04:44–05:17	30.53 mi (49.13 km)	200 yd (180 m)	6 deaths – This long-tracked tornado touched down in Baker County and destroyed a mobile home park just north of Newton; there, six people were killed and three others were injured. A church and 18 houses were destroyed; in addition, ten other houses had minor damage, and nine more had major damage. The tornado crossed into Mitchell County where it destroyed two houses and caused major damage to 25 others as well as minor damage to 26 more. Thirteen businesses sustained minor damage, about 200 acres of pecan trees were uprooted, and a "semi truck" was flipped. The tornado moved into Dougherty County and ripped carports and shingles away from several houses. Two houses sustained major damage, and ten others had minor damage. Hundreds of trees were downed before the tornado crossed into Worth County and moved north of Bridgeboro; there, it uprooted trees and damaged several mobile homes before dissipating.

=== March 2 event ===
List of confirmed tornadoes – Friday, March 2, 2007
EF#	Location	County / Parish	State	Start Coord.	Time (UTC)	Path length	Max width	Summary
EF2	SSW of Sylvester	Worth	GA	31.4432°N 83.8922°W	05:20–05:28	4.55 mi (7.32 km)	150 yd (140 m)	This tornado came from the same supercell that produced the long-tracked Newton EF2 tornado. A brick house lost its roof and some exterior walls collapsed. Two vehicles outside that house were thrown into a nearby field. Many trees were uprooted, one of which fell on another house. The tornado moved northeastward and destroyed another house, injuring two people. Finally, it downed hundreds more trees before dissipating.
EF2	Sumner	Worth	GA	31.5066°N 83.7565°W	05:30–05:35	2.93 mi (4.72 km)	200 yd (180 m)	A mobile home was destroyed and 24 other structures were damaged, about half of them heavily. Many trees and power poles were downed.
EF1	N of Chula	Tift, Turner	GA	31.55°N 83.6179°W	05:42–05:52	7.9 mi (12.7 km)	150 yd (140 m)	A tornado touched down in Tift County and moved northeastward, striking Sunsweet. Seven houses were heavily damaged, and 13 others sustained minor damage. Numerous trees were downed before the tornado entered Turner County where it destroyed a barn and two houses then caused roof damage to several others. In addition, 13 other houses sustained varying degrees of damage. Trees, fences, and an irrigation system were downed before the tornado dissipated.
EF0	E of Monticello	Jefferson	FL	30.53°N 83.8364°W	07:10–07:16	2.28 mi (3.67 km)	50 yd (46 m)	A quick spin-up tornado that formed on the leading edge of a squall line uprooted several trees and caused minor roof damage to one structure.
EF0	NNE of New Ellenton	Aiken	SC	33.65°N 81.68°W	07:20–07:30	4.48 mi (7.21 km)	80 yd (73 m)	A weak tornado caused minor damage to two houses and downed trees.
EF1	Cherry Lake	Madison	FL	30.58°N 83.43°W	07:36–07:44	3 mi (4.8 km)	50 yd (46 m)	A house sustained roof and porch damage, and 130 acres of planted pine trees were knocked down, with some of those trees landing on and damaging a vehicle.
EF0	Lake Park	Lowndes	GA	30.6745°N 83.1955°W	07:55–08:01	2 mi (3.2 km)	50 yd (46 m)	Brief tornado touched down near a RV park. Minor structural damage was observed, and numerous trees were downed.
EF0	N of Wellborn	Suwannee	FL	30.29°N 82.82°W	09:00	0.1 mi (0.16 km)	100 yd (91 m)	A brief tornado was reported by the Suwannee Valley Electric Company. It caused heavy damage to a garage and downed trees and power lines.
EF0	SSE of Callahan	Nassau	FL	30.5322°N 81.8018°W	10:25–10:30	1.19 mi (1.92 km)	100 yd (91 m)	A tornado damaged three mobile homes, several sheds, and some fences. A number of trees were downed as well.
EF0	NNE of Gloucester	Carteret	NC	34.75°N 76.53°W	13:40–13:41	0.1 mi (0.16 km)	10 yd (9.1 m)	A waterspout moved ashore near Smyrna and blew siding off a house.

=== March 10 event ===
List of confirmed tornadoes – Saturday, March 10, 2007
EF#	Location	County / Parish	State	Start Coord.	Time (UTC)	Path length	Max width	Summary
EF1	Estelline	Hall	TX	34.55°N 100.43°W	02:17–02:18	0.25 mi (0.40 km)	100 yd (91 m)	A brief, non-mesocyclonic tornado embedded inside a downburst completely collapsed two old brick buildings, blew in doors and windows, and destroyed a mobile home.

=== March 13 event ===
List of confirmed tornadoes – Tuesday, March 13, 2007
EF#	Location	County / Parish	State	Start Coord.	Time (UTC)	Path length	Max width	Summary
EF0	S of Berclair	Bee, Goliad	TX	28.44°N 97.53°W	00:51–00:56	0.5 mi (0.80 km)	50 yd (46 m)	A brief tornado touched down with no damage being reported.

=== March 14 event ===
List of confirmed tornadoes – Wednesday, March 14, 2007
EF#	Location	County / Parish	State	Start Coord.	Time (UTC)	Path length	Max width	Summary
EF0	Houma	Terrebonne	LA	29.60°N 90.72°W	13:50–13:53	0.2 mi (0.32 km)	25 yd (23 m)	A brief tornado caused minor damage to four homes and downed three power poles, one of which landed on top of a vehicle.
EF0	Northern Elyria	Lorain	OH	41.37°N 82.10°W	23:32–23:36	2 mi (3.2 km)	20 yd (18 m)	A weak, intermittent tornado tore the roof of off a greenhouse, destroyed a garage (damaging a vehicle inside), removed siding from a store, and picked up a shopping cart and slammed it through a window. Many trees and power lines were downed as well.

=== March 16 event ===
List of confirmed tornadoes – Friday, March 16, 2007
EF#	Location	County / Parish	State	Start Coord.	Time (UTC)	Path length	Max width	Summary
EF0	E of Bunnell	Flagler	FL	29.47°N 81.21°W	14:45–14:48	0.01 mi (0.016 km)	10 yd (9.1 m)	A brief tornado downed road signs and palm trees.

=== March 21 event ===
List of confirmed tornadoes – Wednesday, March 21, 2007
EF#	Location	County / Parish	State	Start Coord.	Time (UTC)	Path length	Max width	Summary
EF0	WSW of Seymour	Wayne	IA	40.62°N 93.31°W	05:39–05:41	1.4 mi (2.3 km)	35 yd (32 m)	A few homes and a building were damaged.

=== March 23 event ===
List of confirmed tornadoes – Wednesday, March 21, 2007
EF#	Location	County / Parish	State	Start Coord.	Time (UTC)	Path length	Max width	Summary
EF1	Logan	Quay	NM	35.3427°N 103.42°W	21:12–21:20	2.67 mi (4.30 km)	200 yd (180 m)	About 50 manufactured homes and recreational vehicles were tossed and/or rolled and site-built structures suffered window and roof damage. 12 people suffered minor injuries.
EF0	SW of Adams	Texas	OK	36.7193°N 101.1183°W	22:11–22:14	1.38 mi (2.22 km)	440 yd (400 m)	A tornado remained over open country and caused no damage.
EF0	WSW of Lovington	Lea	NM	32.8636°N 103.5409°W	22:32–22:38	3 mi (4.8 km)	30 yd (27 m)	A tornado was observed by several trained spotters and the public. It remained over open pasture and caused no damage.
EF2	W of McDonald to W of Tatum	Lea	NM	33.13°N 103.4495°W	23:07–23:14	8.36 mi (13.45 km)	880 yd (800 m)	Many power poles were snapped and a 300 pounds (140 kg) water trough was thrown several hundred feet.
EF0	S of Crossroads	Lea	NM	33.3971°N 103.33°W	23:36–23:38	1 mi (1.6 km)	100 yd (91 m)	A rope tornado remained over open range and caused no damage.
EF0	SW of Crossroads	Lea	NM	33.49°N 103.37°W	23:45–23:47	1 mi (1.6 km)	75 yd (69 m)	A small tornado destroyed an oil field pump house was destroyed as it moved over open country.
EF0	SW of Milnesand	Roosevelt	NM	33.637°N 103.347°W	00:05–00:08	0.6 mi (0.97 km)	70 yd (64 m)	Power and electric lines were downed.
EF0	SE of Fort Stockton	Pecos	TX	30.6755°N 102.632°W	00:30–00:35	2 mi (3.2 km)	75 yd (69 m)	A tornado was caught on film over open country with no damage being reported.
EF0	N of Arch	Roosevelt	NM	34.142°N 103.144°W	01:24–01:27	0.57 mi (0.92 km)	70 yd (64 m)	No damage was reported.
EF0	Rogers	Roosevelt	NM	33.98°N 103.23°W	01:28–01:30	0.18 mi (0.29 km)	50 yd (46 m)	A brief tornado touched down over open country. It was initially reported that the tornado destroyed a house, but an aerial survey did not confirm this and no other areas of possible damage was found.
EF2	Cameo to Clovis	Roosevelt, Curry	NM	34.24°N 103.17°W	01:30–02:06	12.45 mi (20.04 km)	350 yd (320 m)	2 deaths – This strong tornado touched down in Roosevelt County and destroyed a dairy, killing or badly injuring 190 dairy cows, before moving into Curry County. There it damaged power lines and irrigation equipment. It continued generally northward and damaged several structures and downed more power lines. As it moved near Clovis about 500 homes and other structures suffered different degrees of damage. This damage ranged from the destruction of mobile homes and wall collapses in some structures to damage to roofs and rooftop air conditioning units. 35 people were injured with two elderly citizens eventually succumbing to their injuries, making this the first tornado to result in fatalities since October 1974. The two fatalities also tied this tornado with another tornado in Wagon Mound on May 31, 1930, for the deadliest tornado in state history.
EF0	S of Farwell	Parmer	TX	34.37°N 103.03°W	01:59–2:02	1 mi (1.6 km)	50 yd (46 m)	A tornado remained in open fields just east of the Texas/New Mexico border and caused no damage.
EF0	ESE of Lakewood	Eddy	NM	32.57°N 104.21°W	02:00	0.1 mi (0.16 km)	20 yd (18 m)	A brief rope tornado caused no damage.
EF0	W of Muleshoe	Bailey	TX	34.22°N 102.99°W	02:12–02:13	0.25 mi (0.40 km)	50 yd (46 m)	Power lines and poles were downed.
EF0	NNE of Rankin	Upton	TX	31.32°N 101.90°W	02:16–02:21	2 mi (3.2 km)	50 yd (46 m)	A tornado remained over open country and caused no damage.
EF0	Bovina	Parmer	TX	34.52°N 102.90°W	02:38–02:41	1.75 mi (2.82 km)	40 yd (37 m)	Trees and tree limbs were downed, storage sheds were destroyed, several homes sustained roof and window damage, and a carport was wrapped around a tree. Windows were blown out of a mobile home and a horse stable at a farm was destroyed.
EF0	SW of Morton	Cochran	TX	33.66°N 102.84°W	04:18–04:19	0.5 mi (0.80 km)	75 yd (69 m)	A brief tornado collapsed part of one building and shifted another off its foundation.
EF2	WNW of Morton	Cochran	TX	33.72°N 102.84°W	04:22–04:26	1.5 mi (2.4 km)	150 yd (140 m)	This tornado formed shortly after the tornado above. The Star Route Gin was partially destroyed with concrete anchors being pulled out of the ground and portions of the steel roof beams being heavily damaged. At least three irrigation systems were destroyed and over a dozen power poles were snapped.

=== March 24 event ===
List of confirmed tornadoes – Wednesday, March 21, 2007
EF#	Location	County / Parish	State	Start Coord.	Time (UTC)	Path length	Max width	Summary
EF1	SSE of McLean	Gray	TX	35.22°N 100.60°W	08:59–09:02	2 mi (3.2 km)	50 yd (46 m)	A barn, an outbuilding, and farm equipment were damaged.
EF0	E of Clarkville	Yuma	CO	40.39°N 102.33°W	21:40–21:41	0.25 mi (0.40 km)	10 yd (9.1 m)	A brief tornado touched down with no damage being reported.
EF0	WNW of Holyoke	Phillips	CO	40.61°N 102.33°W	22:22	0.1 mi (0.16 km)	50 yd (46 m)	A brief tornado touched down with no damage being reported.
EF0	N of Amherst	Phillips	CO	40.74°N 102.17°W	22:55	0.1 mi (0.16 km)	50 yd (46 m)	A brief tornado touched down with no damage being reported.
EF0	E of Julesburg	Sedgwick	CO	40.95°N 102.07°W	23:35	0.1 mi (0.16 km)	50 yd (46 m)	A brief tornado touched down with no damage being reported.
EF0	NE of Ogallala	Keith	NE	41.14°N 101.71°W	23:35	0.1 mi (0.16 km)	10 yd (9.1 m)	A brief tornado touched down with no damage being reported.
EF0	N of Big Springs	Deuel	NE	41.10°N 102.08°W	23:45	0.1 mi (0.16 km)	10 yd (9.1 m)	A brief tornado touched down with no damage being reported.
EF0	NE of Hayes Center	Hayes	NE	40.54°N 100.99°W	23:53	0.1 mi (0.16 km)	20 yd (18 m)	A brief tornado touched down over open ranchland with no damage being reported.

=== March 26 event ===
List of confirmed tornadoes – Monday, March 26, 2007
EF#	Location	County / Parish	State	Start Coord.	Time (UTC)	Path length	Max width	Summary
EF0	E of Hondo	Medina	TX	29.35°N 99.12°W	19:20–19:29	3 mi (4.8 km)	30 yd (27 m)	Large tree limbs were blown out of a tree.
EF0	NW of Devine	Medina	TX	29.19°N 98.97°W	19:37–19:40	0.5 mi (0.80 km)	30 yd (27 m)	A brief tornado touched down with no damage being reported.
EF0	W of Castroville	Medina	TX	29.35°N 99.18°W	19:45–19:48	0.5 mi (0.80 km)	40 yd (37 m)	A brief tornado touched down with no damage being reported.

=== March 27 event ===
List of confirmed tornadoes – Tuesday, March 27, 2007
EF#	Location	County / Parish	State	Start Coord.	Time (UTC)	Path length	Max width	Summary
EF1	W of Marshall	Harrison	TX	32.4584°N 94.4548°W	16:31–16:45	10 mi (16 km)	50 yd (46 m)	One tree was downed while large tree branches were snapped off many other trees. A barn was also obliterated.
EF0	E of Scottsville to SW of Leigh	Harrison	TX	32.53°N 94.1786°W	17:40–17:50	6 mi (9.7 km)	25 yd (23 m)	Large tree limbs were snapped off numerous trees.
EF0	NW of Lewisville to NW of Patmos	Lafayette, Hempstead	AR	33.4216°N 93.6657°W	19:14–19:30	5 mi (8.0 km)	75 yd (69 m)	A chicken house was damaged and trees were downed in Lafayette County. In Hempstead County, a porch was torn from a home and another home suffered shingle damage. An 18-wheeler and a cattle trailer were overturned and several trees were uprooted as well.
EF1	Shongaloo	Webster	LA	32.90°N 93.32°W	19:35–19:50	8 mi (13 km)	75 yd (69 m)	Many trees were downed, one of which fell on an abandoned home and another that fell on a truck.

=== March 28 event ===
List of confirmed tornadoes – Wednesday, March 28, 2007
EF#	Location	County / Parish	State	Start Coord.	Time (UTC)	Path length	Max width	Summary
EF0	N of Atlanta	Logan	IL	40.28°N 89.23°W	20:05	0.1 mi (0.16 km)	10 yd (9.1 m)	A brief tornado remained in an open field with no damage reported.
EF0	SW of McLean	McLean	IL	40.3°N 89.2°W	20:19	0.1 mi (0.16 km)	10 yd (9.1 m)	A brief tornado remained in an open field with no damage reported.
EF0	ESE of Kress to SW of Silverton	Floyd, Swisher, Briscoe	TX	34.28°N 101.5°W	22:20–22:25	2.5 mi (4.0 km)	75 yd (69 m)	A tornado remained over open fields with no damage reported.
EF0	SW of Silverton	Briscoe	TX	34.37°N 101.42°W	22:28–22:33	2 mi (3.2 km)	75 yd (69 m)	A tornado remained in an open field with no damage reported.
EF1	Silverton	Briscoe	TX	34.45°N 101.36°W	22:43–23:00	6.75 mi (10.86 km)	100 yd (91 m)	Seven utility poles were damaged along with lightweight buildings as the tornado impacted the outskirts of Silverton.
EF0	NE of Silverton (1st tornado)	Briscoe	TX	34.54°N 101.22°W	23:03–23:14	4.75 mi (7.64 km)	220 yd (200 m)	A large cone tornado remained over open country with no damage.
EF0	N of South Plains	Floyd	TX	34.25°N 101.32°W	23:03–23:04	0.5 mi (0.80 km)	50 yd (46 m)	A tornado caused light roof damage to an abandoned farm house, but otherwise remained over open farm land.
EF0	NE of Silverton (2nd tornado)	Briscoe	TX	34.67°N 101.2°W	23:10–23:16	1.75 mi (2.82 km)	100 yd (91 m)	A rope tornado, which occurred simultaneously with the large cone tornado near Silverton, remained over open country with no damage.
EF2	N of Quitaque to NW of Brice	Briscoe, Hall, Donley	TX	34.5°N 101.5°W	23:35–00:09	17.5 mi (28.2 km)	300 yd (270 m)	A large multiple-vortex tornado destroyed a mobile home and tore the roof off a house. A barn and two windmills were destroyed as well.
EF0	SW of Clarendon	Donley	TX	34.7971°N 101.062°W	23:40–23:50	1 mi (1.6 km)	100 yd (91 m)	A brief tornado remained in an open field with no damage reported.
EF0	SSE of Sharon Springs	Wallace	KS	38.8533°N 101.7158°W	23:49−23:50	0.5 mi (0.80 km)	10 yd (9.1 m)	A brief tornado remained in an open field with no damage reported.
EF0	Eastern Sharon Springs	Wallace	KS	38.88°N 101.73°W	23:52–00:07	6 mi (9.7 km)	75 yd (69 m)	Minor damage occurred on the east side of Sharon Springs before the tornado moved over open country.
EF1	W of Clarendon	Donley	TX	34.7697°N 100.9809°W	23:55–00:11	7.27 mi (11.70 km)	150 yd (140 m)	One house was damaged on the south side of US 287.
EF2	ESE of Beaver	Beaver	OK	36.728°N 100.4051°W	00:04–00:21	6 mi (9.7 km)	100 yd (91 m)	This tornado struck a ranch, where several utility trailers were tossed considerable distances, and a horse trailer was tossed over 150 yd (140 m). Several power poles and trees were snapped at the base, and a grain bin was destroyed, with part of it carried over 100 yd (91 m) away.
EF0	Eastern Jennings	Decatur	KS	39.6187°N 100.2003°W	00:05–00:20	8 mi (13 km)	25 yd (23 m)	Tree damage occurred and several grain bins were destroyed on the east side of town.
EF0	S of Merriman	Cherry	NE	42.5193°N 101.9259°W	00:12–00:17	3 mi (4.8 km)	150 yd (140 m)	Tree tops were snapped off, and a door was ripped off of a house on a ranch.
EF2	E of Booker, TX to E of Elmwood, OK	Lipscomb (TX), Beaver (OK)	TX, OK	36.45°N 100.4401°W	00:16–00:54	22 mi (35 km)	150 yd (140 m)	2 deaths – A long-lived, multiple-vortex tornado caused no damage in Texas before crossing into Oklahoma, destroying grain bins and outbuildings. Large trees and power poles were snapped, and a house was destroyed, killing the couple inside who took refuge in their small bathroom. A nearby barn was destroyed, and two vehicles were moved 20 yd (18 m). A horse trailer was also thrown 50 yd (46 m). The tornado downed additional trees, power lines, and fences before dissipating.
EF0	SE of Meade	Meade	KS	37.25°N 100.29°W	00:28–00:32	1.4 mi (2.3 km)	50 yd (46 m)	A brief tornado remained in an open field with no damage reported.
EF0	NE of Meade	Meade	KS	37.33°N 100.27°W	00:32–00:35	1.3 mi (2.1 km)	50 yd (46 m)	A brief tornado remained in an open field with no damage reported.
EF0	NE of Coolidge to SW of Tribune	Hamilton, Greeley	KS	38.12°N 101.88°W	00:33–01:04	21.6 mi (34.8 km)	100 yd (91 m)	A long-tracked tornado remained over open country with no reported damage.
EF0	SSE of Goodland	Sherman	KS	39.2031°N 101.6414°W	00:37–00:38	0.5 mi (0.80 km)	10 yd (9.1 m)	A brief tornado remained in an open field with no damage reported.
EF3	W of Jericho	Donley, Gray	TX	35.13°N 100.94°W	00:39–00:54	6.35 mi (10.22 km)	600 yd (550 m)	In Donley County, a horse barn was heavily damaged, a steel fence was bent, and a boxcar and nearby feeding trough were thrown 100 yards (91 m). A mobile home sustained minor damage, and a large house lost a substantial portion of its roof. A property owner in this area also reported that irrigation pivot tires weighing 300 pounds were relocated, and a 1,500 pound fertilizer tank that was one quarter full was missing. As the tornado crossed I-40, three semi-trucks were tossed around, with the driver and his wife sucked out of one of them. Both were seriously injured, and the contents of the truck were scattered up to a mile away. In Gray County, two additional injuries occurred, and metal roofing was torn from barns and outbuildings before the tornado dissipated.
EF1	W of Fowler to Ensign	Meade, Gray	KS	37.38°N 100.25°W	00:42–01:05	13.47 mi (21.68 km)	125 yd (114 m)	Tornado damaged trees, a barn, and an irrigation pivot.
EF2	NW of Hedley	Donley	TX	34.93°N 100.74°W	00:46–00:55	4.15 mi (6.68 km)	528 yd (483 m)	Initially, the tornado only damaged a tin roof, fences, and tree limbs. The tornado then intensified and caused significant damage to a house and an attached garage, and snapped multiple tree trunks at the base. A large barn was completely swept away, with debris scattered 500 yd (460 m) downwind, and a hitch trailer stored inside was carried away and deposited in a tree. Several power poles were snapped and carried up to 20 yd (18 m) away. A van was displaced into a grove of trees near the end of the path.
EF0	SE of Goodland	Sherman	KS	39.2989°N 101.6539°W	00:49–00:50	0.5 mi (0.80 km)	10 yd (9.1 m)	A brief tornado remained in an open field with no damage reported.
EF0	ESE of Ensign to S of Howell	Ford	KS	37.6325°N 100.18°W	00:58–01:12	7.8 mi (12.6 km)	50 yd (46 m)	A tornado caused minor tree damage.
EF0	N of Hedley	Donley	TX	35.029°N 100.67°W	01:02–01:04	0.25 mi (0.40 km)	50 yd (46 m)	A brief tornado remained in an open field with no damage reported.
EF1	W of Arthur	Arthur	NE	41.4064°N 101.9183°W	01:05–01:35	20.61 mi (33.17 km)	100 yd (91 m)	Damage was limited to trees.
EF0	NW of Imperial	Chase	NE	40.6631°N 101.8185°W	01:05	0.1 mi (0.16 km)	20 yd (18 m)	A brief tornado remained in an open field with no damage reported.
EF0	N of Edson (1st tornado)	Sherman	KS	39.3589°N 101.55°E	01:06–01:11	3 mi (4.8 km)	25 yd (23 m)	A weak tornado moved over open fields, causing no damage.
EF1	WSW of Tribune to S of Weskan	Greeley, Wallace	KS	38.4423°N 101.8353°W	01:09–01:53	23 mi (37 km)	100 yd (91 m)	Three unoccupied mobile homes were damaged by this long-lived tornado.
EF1	NE of Lamar to SSE of Brandon	Chase, Perkins	NE	40.6922°N 101.82°W	01:11–01:14	2.48 mi (3.99 km)	20 yd (18 m)	Power poles were snapped.
EF0	SE of Brandon	Perkins	NE	40.71°N 101.76°W	01:12	0.2 mi (0.32 km)	20 yd (18 m)	A brief tornado remained in an open field with no damage reported.
EF2	NE of Jericho	Donley	TX	35.12°N 100.78°W	01:13–01:24	4.53 mi (7.29 km)	200 yd (180 m)	A strong tornado initially caused tree and fence damage before striking a home, tearing the roof off and scattering debris up to a mile away. The walls of the house were made of reinforced concrete, preventing any further damage at that location. Numerous large trees were snapped and defoliated, and several power poles were snapped as well. 200 yd (180 m) of barbed-wire fence was reportedly rolled into a ball at one location.
EF1	NW of Ensign	Gray	KS	37.67°N 100.25°W	01:14–01:31	10.4 mi (16.7 km)	200 yd (180 m)	Irrigation sprinklers, sheds, barns, garages, trees and a corral were damaged.
EF2	NE of Goodland to NW of Bird City	Sherman, Cheyenne	KS	39.4829°N 101.548°W	01:15–02:17	34 mi (55 km)	700 yd (640 m)	In Sherman County, numerous trees and 15 power poles were snapped by this large, long-tracked tornado. In Cheyenne County, four homes had their roofs torn off, with some damage to exterior walls noted. Garages, outbuildings, and grain bins were destroyed as well. Additionally, 22 mule deer, 50 ducks, 4 pheasants, 4 rabbits and 2 song birds were killed according to wildlife officials.
EF0	SE of Alanreed	Donley	TX	35.087°N 100.675°W	01:15–01:18	1 mi (1.6 km)	50 yd (46 m)	A brief tornado remained in an open field with no damage reported.
EF2	W of Grant	Perkins	NE	40.7598°N 101.7693°W	01:20–01:52	15.93 mi (25.64 km)	900 yd (820 m)	A large wedge tornado damaged three farms. Outbuildings, barns, and grain bins were destroyed, and one farmhouse had its roof torn off, while another had a hole torn in its roof. Trees and power poles were snapped, and irrigation pivots were overturned as well.
EF1	SSW of Grant	Perkins	NE	40.7598°N 101.78°W	01:20–01:52	2.34 mi (3.77 km)	30 yd (27 m)	A second tornado formed to the west of the EF2 tornado above and tracked northeast before dissipating as the other one became dominant. Power poles were broken.
EF2	SE of McLean	Gray	TX	35.2096°N 100.575°W	01:23–01:38	3.61 mi (5.81 km)	200 yd (180 m)	A mesonet weather station recorded a wind gust of around 127 mph (204 km/h), and a Texas Department of Transportation meteorological tower was bent at a ninety degree angle to the ground. A nearby veterinary clinic had a highway sign impaled through one of its exterior walls and lost part of its tin roof. A barn was destroyed, outbuildings were damaged, a house sustained major roof damage, and a satellite dish was damaged as well. The approach of the tornado prompted the issuance of a tornado emergency for McLean.
EF0	SE of Lefors	Gray	TX	35.4198°N 100.8075°W	01:30	0.25 mi (0.40 km)	50 yd (46 m)	This tornado was spawned by the same storm that produced the Jericho tornado. A semi-truck was pushed into a guardrail along SH 273 and tree limbs were snapped.
EF1	N of Howell to W of Jetmore	Ford, Hodgeman	KS	37.9015°N 100.1525°W	01:32–01:56	10.72 mi (17.25 km)	200 yd (180 m)	A tornado damaged trees and power poles.
EF1	NE of Lefors	Gray	TX	35.4402°N 100.8075°W	01:36–01:37	0.25 mi (0.40 km)	50 yd (46 m)	Several garages were damaged and one was completely destroyed. A travel trailer near the destroyed garage was thrown 40 yd (37 m) and destroyed. Large tree branches and power poles were snapped, and fences were damaged as well. A large antique car was moved approximately 15 yd (14 m) and was rotated cyclonically from its original position. Two large tanks weighing 2,000 pounds each were moved 75 yd (69 m).
EF0	Meade State Park	Meade	KS	37.0041°N 100.2736°W	01:39–01:58	8.7 mi (14.0 km)	100 yd (91 m)	A tornado remained over open fields with no damage reported.
EF3	NNE of McLean	Gray	TX	35.3235°N 100.5526°W	01:45–02:00	7.99 mi (12.86 km)	1,760 yd (1,610 m)	This large wedge tornado, which was 1 mi (1.6 km) wide at times and moved at up to 45 mph (72 km/h), formed after the previous tornado near McLean dissipated. Wooden high-tension power poles were snapped off at the base, and trees were completely debarked, with only the stubs of the largest branches remaining. A residence at the outer edge of the circulation had metal roofing peeled back, a porch blown off, and a brick chimney collapsed. A nearby bunkhouse lost its roof. Elsewhere, an anchored large steel feed bunk was pulled out of the ground.
EF1	S of Ashby	Grant	NE	41.8754°N 101.92°W	01:46–01:50	2 mi (3.2 km)	100 yd (91 m)	Power lines, trees and fences were damaged, and cattle feeding equipment was moved.
EF1	E of Bird City to W of McDonald	Cheyenne	KS	39.75°N 101.4548°W	01:49–01:56	4 mi (6.4 km)	100 yd (91 m)	This was a satellite tornado was to the large EF2 Bird City tornado. Four power poles were snapped.
EF3	Holly to S of Towner	Prowers, Kiowa	CO	38.02°N 102.12°W	01:54–02:35	28 mi (45 km)	900 yd (820 m)	2 deaths – A large tornado began in Prowers County and rapidly intensified to EF3 strength, devastating the town of Holly where up to 200 structures were damaged or destroyed, and some block-foundation homes were swept away. Extensive tree damage occurred, and vehicles were thrown as well. One of the fatalities occurred in a mobile home while the other occurred in a permanent home. In the northeast part of the county, the tornado inflicted high-end EF3 damage to a ranch. Damage in Kiowa County was limited to EF2 damage to power poles. Nine people were injured.
EF0	NW of Ogallala	Keith	NE	41.05°N 101.85°W	02:00	0.1 mi (0.16 km)	20 yd (18 m)	A brief tornado remained in an open field with no damage reported.
EF3	W of Jetmore to NE of Beeler	Hodgeman, Ness	KS	38.08°N 100.0736°W	02:01–02:50	29.09 mi (46.82 km)	1,320 yd (1,210 m)	A large, long-tracked wedge tornado formed after the EF1 tornado near Jetmore dissipated. It damaged or destroyed nine homes, snapped hundreds of trees and power poles, and destroyed irrigation pivots and barns. A wedding book registry from one of the destroyed residences in Hodgeman County was found 34 mi (55 km) away, while debris from a shed in the same county was found 40 mi (64 km) to the north. A large oil tank was tossed onto a road, and 90 head of cattle were killed.
EF1	SE of Benkelman, NE	Cheyenne (KS), Dundy (NE)	KS, NE	39.9103°N 101.4435°W	02:09–02:36	15 mi (24 km)	400 yd (370 m)	A tornado touched down in Kansas and moved into Nebraska as the large EF2 Bird City tornado was dissipating to its west. A house lost its roof, and a barn and several other outbuildings were destroyed. A golf course suffered significant tree damage, and several houses were damaged at that location as well. Grain bins were also destroyed.
EF1	Western Ogallala	Keith	NE	41.1205°N 101.7497°W	02:11–02:14	0.69 mi (1.11 km)	20 yd (18 m)	A tornado destroyed outbuildings and a garage, snapped trees and power lines, damaged roofs, and overturned horse trailers.
EF0	N of Ogallala	Keith	NE	41.19°N 101.71°W	02:20	0.1 mi (0.16 km)	20 yd (18 m)	A brief tornado caused minor roof damage to homes and snapped tree limbs.
EF0	E of Edson	Sherman	KS	39.33°N 101.4752°W	02:29–02:34	2.5 mi (4.0 km)	25 yd (23 m)	A brief tornado was observed with power flashes being noted as it passed over power poles.
EF3	E of Miami to W of Canadian	Hemphill	TX	35.6863°N 100.4891°W	02:30–02:55	7.77 mi (12.50 km)	1,408 yd (1,287 m)	1 death – A large tornado moved through an oil drilling location, tossing a mobile home 100 yd (91 m) and destroying it. A nearby semi-trailer was blown over and a railroad boxcar was rolled 150 yd (140 m). A structure used to lift the oil-well casing onto the oil derrick was also blown down and severely damaged, and numerous power poles were snapped nearby. At another drilling site further along the path, a mobile home was rolled over and two fifth-wheel trailers were blown 30–40 yd (27–37 m) away, fatally injuring a person inside one of the trailers. Numerous large trees were snapped, including some that landed on a home at the edge of the circulation. Another well-built house lost much of its roof, and a nearby 6,000 pound feed storage bunk was blown over. The tornado then derailed 50 cars on a BNSF freight train before dissipating. In addition to the fatality, one person was injured.
EF1	ENE of Towner, CO	Kiowa (CO), Greeley (KS)	CO, KS	38.4603°N 102.0501°W	02:40–03:01	11.62 mi (18.70 km)	440 yd (400 m)	This tornado touched down in Colorado and moved into Kansas after the Holly EF3 tornado dissipated. Damage was limited to the destruction of four power poles in Colorado with little to no damage occurring in Kansas.
EF0	NE of Edson	Sherman	KS	39.3709°N 101.4971°W	02:54–02:55	0.5 mi (0.80 km)	10 yd (9.1 m)	A tornado remained over open fields with no damage reported.
EF0	S of Weskan	Wallace	KS	38.7977°N 101.97°W	03:09–03:10	0.5 mi (0.80 km)	10 yd (9.1 m)	A brief tornado remained in an open field with no damage reported.
EF0	Eastern Bird City	Cheyenne	KS	39.7398°N 101.5167°W	03:24–03:28	2 mi (3.2 km)	25 yd (23 m)	A brief tornado remained in open fields with no damage reported.

=== March 29 event ===
List of confirmed tornadoes – Thursday, March 29, 2007
EF#	Location	County / Parish	State	Start Coord.	Time (UTC)	Path length	Max width	Summary
EF1	ESE of Okeene	Blaine	OK	36.1°N 98.36°W	20:05–20:10	2.3 mi (3.7 km)	20 yd (18 m)	Barns and garages were heavily damaged, tree limbs were snapped, and grain bins were thrown. Debris from the damaged structures was scattered up to 2,000 feet away.
EF2	E of Yukon to SE of Piedmont	Canadian	OK	35.5°N 97.71°W	21:05–21:25	7.5 mi (12.1 km)	50 yd (46 m)	Numerous homes were damaged, some heavily. Several travel trailers and a boat were rolled, outbuildings were destroyed, and hardwood trees and power poles were snapped. Three large electrical transmission towers were damaged, and a large metal building was severely damaged. Two people were injured in one of the destroyed travel trailers while three others were also injured when their vehicles were flipped on the Kilpatrick Turnpike.
EF0	WNW of Hillsdale	Garfield, Grant	OK	36.57°N 98.03°W	21:20–21:30	3 mi (4.8 km)	20 yd (18 m)	Barns and sheds were damaged, trees were uprooted, feeding troughs were tossed, and a metal gate was blown over.

=== March 30 event ===
List of confirmed tornadoes – Friday, March 30, 2007
EF#	Location	County / Parish	State	Start Coord.	Time (UTC)	Path length	Max width	Summary
EF0	NW of Woodcreek	Hays	TX	30.14°N 98.22°W	15:03–15:05	0.2 mi (0.32 km)	50 yd (46 m)	A brief tornado touched down with no damage being reported.
EF0	SW of Dripping Springs	Hays	TX	30.12°N 98.17°W	15:25–15:28	0.3 mi (0.48 km)	50 yd (46 m)	A brief tornado touched down with no damage being reported.
EF0	S of Carbon	Eastland	TX	32.24°N 98.83°W	16:20–16:22	1 mi (1.6 km)	30 yd (27 m)	A brief tornado touched down with no damage being reported.
EF0	E of Sweetwater	Nolan, Fisher	TX	32.47°N 100.21°W	17:02–17:10	7.21 mi (11.60 km)	75 yd (69 m)	A tornado turned over a tractor trailer rig on I-20, injuring the driver. Tree and power pole damage occurred further along the path.
EF0	WNW of Huckabay	Erath	TX	32.38°N 98.44°W	17:43–17:44	1 mi (1.6 km)	30 yd (27 m)	A brief tornado touched down with no damage being reported.
EF0	Fort Hood	Coryell, Bell	TX	31.1°N 97.86°W	20:55–20:59	2.5 mi (4.0 km)	30 yd (27 m)	A tornado crossed a runway at the Robert Gray Army Airfield without causing any damage. ASOS on the runway measured a 71 mph (114 km/h) wind gust.
EF1	E of Mound	Coryell	TX	31.35°N 97.6°W	21:36–21:40	3.06 mi (4.92 km)	30 yd (27 m)	A few barns and two houses were damaged and trees were downed.
EF1	SW of McGregor	McLennan	TX	31.42°N 97.44°W	21:40–21:45	2 mi (3.2 km)	30 yd (27 m)	The back half of a metal rodeo arena was destroyed.
EF0	Riesel	McLennan	TX	31.48°N 96.93°W	23:00	0.5 mi (0.80 km)	30 yd (27 m)	A brief tornado touched down with no damage being reported.
EF1	Wylie	Collin	TX	33.02°N 96.55°W	02:20–02:22	0.75 mi (1.21 km)	40 yd (37 m)	This tornado developed on the leading edge of a bow echo.Approximately 25 to 30 homes in and south of the Riverchase subdivision suffered substantial damage to roofs and garage doors. Several other homes suffered minor roof damage, broken windows, and fence damage. In addition, several trees along the track were downed. (Note: The NCEI lists this event as an EF0 tornado, but the report summary says the tornado was rated EF1.)
EF0	ENE of Council Grove	Morris	KS	38.68°N 96.39°W	02:28–02:30	2.8 mi (4.5 km)	20 yd (18 m)	A windmill was toppled, a pole shed was destroyed, and a barn was shifted off of its foundation. Tree damage occurred as well.
EF0	SW of Clinton	Douglas	KS	38.86°N 95.46°W	03:39–03:41	2 mi (3.2 km)	30 yd (27 m)	Two trees fell onto a house, which sustained major wind damage to its roof and garage door. Additional tree damage occurred further along the path.

=== March 31 event ===
List of confirmed tornadoes – Saturday, March 31, 2007
EF#	Location	County / Parish	State	Start Coord.	Time (UTC)	Path length	Max width	Summary
EF1	S of Halletsville	Lavaca	TX	29.39°N 96.95°W	09:30–09:34	0.8 mi (1.3 km)	100 yd (91 m)	A mobile home was shifted off of its foundation and a barn was destroyed. Several trees were downed as well.
EF2	SE of Halletsville	Lavaca	TX	29.39°N 96.88°W	09:45–09:50	0.4 mi (0.64 km)	75 yd (69 m)	This low-end EF2 tornado obliterated a mobile home, with only the twisted metal frame remaining. Four people inside were thrown 150 feet (46 m) but survived with minor injuries. A truck parked nearby was rolled and crushed.
EF1	W of Herman	Washington (Note: The NCEI report map incorrectly places the tornado Dodge County)	NE	41.67°N 96.56°W	19:35–19:36	1 mi (1.6 km)	440 yd (400 m)	Sheds were damaged, a horse barn was nearly destroyed, and trees and fences were damaged.
EF0	NW of Oelwein	Fayette	IA	41.27°N 91.93°W	21:58–21:59	0.25 mi (0.40 km)	75 yd (69 m)	A tornado touched down briefly on a farm, destroying a 100-year-old barn, damaged a garage, a machine shed, a windmill, and a few trees and blew out the windows of the farmhouse.
EF1	N of Delaware	Delaware, Clayton	IA	42.55°N 91.35°W	22:29–22:41	11.85 mi (19.07 km)	200 yd (180 m)	Considerable tree damage occurred, and outbuildings were damaged. On one farm, a dairy barn collapsed, killing 24 cows and temporarily trapping two people. A two car garage was blown off of its foundation with minor damage to the home right next to it. On another farm, a machine shed was destroyed and boards were impaled into the ground.
EF0	St. Louis	City of St. Louis	MO	38.61°N 90.25°W	22:50–22:52	1.71 mi (2.75 km)	60 yd (55 m)	A weak tornado developed inside a squall line, touching down four times on an intermittent path. After damaging the roofs of three homes, it struck the Saint Louis University Medical Center. Tree limbs were downed and a building sustained roof damage. Windows were blown out at two parking garage nearby. Towards the end of the path, a billboard and traffic lights were damaged. Two people driving on I-64 suffered minor injures and were hospitalized after they were hit by flying debris. Tree damage occurred along the entire path of the tornado.
EF0	ENE of Potosi	Grant	WI	42.69°N 90.68°W	23:18–23:19	0.25 mi (0.40 km)	50 yd (46 m)	A weak tornado caused minor damage to a few buildings and downed a few trees.

== See also ==
- Tornadoes of 2007
- List of United States tornadoes from January to February 2007
- List of United States tornadoes in April 2007
