= Tornado outbreak of March 28–31, 2007 =

Severe storms in the central United States

Tornado outbreak of March 28–31, 2007 (Late-March 2007 tornado outbreak)
Meteorological history
- Duration: March 28–31, 2007

Tornado outbreak
- Tornadoes: 81
- Max. rating: EF3 tornado
- Duration: 3 days, 4 hours
- Highest winds: 90 mph (140 km/h) (non-tornadic)
- Largest hail: Softball size

Overall effects
- Casualties: 5 fatalities, 26 injuries
- Damage: $15.1 million
- Areas affected: Great Plains, Central United States

The tornado outbreak of March 28–31, 2007, also known as the Late-March 2007 tornado outbreak, was a tornado outbreak that took place across the central United States. It developed in the High Plains from South Dakota to central Texas on March 28, 2007, which produced most of the tornadoes. Several more tornadoes were reported the next three days before the system weakened on March 31. It affected western Nebraska, western Kansas, extreme eastern Colorado, and much of Oklahoma, and Texas. It was the second major outbreak of 2007, four weeks after an outbreak farther east. The outbreak produced 80 confirmed tornadoes, with five deaths and extensive damage being reported. In addition to the tornadoes, widespread hail as large as softballs and destructive straight-line winds as strong as 90 mph (140 km/h) were reported.

The activity level was very uncertain for March 29, as it was conditional on the dry line refiring. Despite the squall line remaining intact, several more tornadoes developed. Several more tornadoes developed on March 30 and 31 before the system weakened.

== Meteorological synopsis ==
A powerful mid and upper level system brought terrifically strong wind fields aloft over the southern and central portions of the Great Plains region on March 28. This system was located over the Great Basin and tracked eastward into the central Rocky Mountains during this time frame. Ahead of the system, a dry line developed from a low-pressure area over extreme northeastern Colorado and the Nebraska Panhandle southwards into western Texas. Increasing south to southeasterly winds close and above the surface caused a progressively humid air mass to spread across the western portion of the Great Plains during the afternoon. Unseasonably warm surface temperatures and increased lift ahead of the approaching system supported rapid thunderstorm formations. This altogether allowed for the potential for large hail, damaging winds, and tornadoes.

That afternoon — when the first signs of severe weather developed, tornado watches were issued from South Dakota south to Texas. The advancing dry line and the cold front moving eastward combined to produce explosive supercell development late in the afternoon. Early that evening, supercells containing severe thunderstorms and tornadoes was developed along a nearly continuous line from near Lubbock, Texas to Rapid City, South Dakota. Before the supercells reformed into a squall line late that evening, at least 63 tornadoes were reported, many of which were very large and potentially destructive. Fortunately, the area is sparsely populated, preventing widespread death and destruction. Still, five people were killed.

On March 29, the squall line that moved eastward prevented a major outbreak during the daytime hours. Only a slight risk of severe storms was issued that day. Nonetheless, several tornadoes were reported, with two striking the Oklahoma City metropolitan area with almost no advance warnings issued before they struck. Significant damage was reported there with at least two people hospitalized when their RV was hit and four others injured during a tornado ten minutes later.

Another moderate risk was issued for March 30, this time in south-central Texas into the Mexican state of Coahuila. This was later extended into northern Texas and south-central Oklahoma. At around 2254 UTC, one of the two tornado watches in effect in Texas during the day was lifted, although a watch remained in the state's central and northeastern portions. Later the day, the Oklahoma tornado watch was then extended into eastern Kansas.

A moderate risk was issued for central Texas on March 31 with the storm line continuing through the state, along with Oklahoma and Kansas in a north-eastern direction. This outlook was later changed to a slight risk as the system continued on with a tornado watch in effect in south-eastern Texas. In addition to that, a thunderstorm watch was even in effect for Louisiana. The tornado watch was discontinued around 1504 UTC, although tornado warnings were issued in southeastern Arkansas. Later that day, the system reached the north-central United States. As a result, warnings were issued in Wisconsin, Illinois, and Iowa. As the system continued moving in its north-eastern direction early thatevening, a watch was extended into the north-western portion of Indiana. The system weakened that evening and no tornadoes occurred afterwards; however, NWS officials later confirmed a microburst in the Illinois cities of Carol Stream and Glendale Heights in DuPage County just west of Chicago just before 10:00 PM CDT. Extensive roof and window damage was reported to buildings, including an apartment complex and a church. The damage path was about 0.5 miles (0.80 km) long and 250 yards (230 m) wide.

== Confirmed tornadoes ==
Confirmed tornadoes by Enhanced Fujita rating
EFU	EF0	EF1	EF2	EF3	EF4	EF5	Total
0	44	22	10	5	0	0	81

=== March 28 event ===
List of confirmed tornadoes – Wednesday, March 28, 2007 (Note: All dates are based on the local time zone where the tornado touched down; however, all times are in Coordinated Universal Time for consistency.)
EF#	Location	County / Parish	State	Start Coord.	Time (UTC)	Path length	Max width	Summary
EF0	N of Atlanta	Logan	IL	40.28°N 89.23°W	20:05	0.1 mi (0.16 km)	10 yd (9.1 m)	A brief tornado remained in an open field with no damage reported.
EF0	SW of McLean	McLean	IL	40.3°N 89.2°W	20:19	0.1 mi (0.16 km)	10 yd (9.1 m)	A brief tornado remained in an open field with no damage reported.
EF0	ESE of Kress to SW of Silverton	Floyd, Swisher, Briscoe	TX	34.28°N 101.5°W	22:20–22:25	2.5 mi (4.0 km)	75 yd (69 m)	A tornado remained over open fields with no damage reported.
EF0	SW of Silverton	Briscoe	TX	34.37°N 101.42°W	22:28–22:33	2 mi (3.2 km)	75 yd (69 m)	A tornado remained in an open field with no damage reported.
EF1	Silverton	Briscoe	TX	34.45°N 101.36°W	22:43–23:00	6.75 mi (10.86 km)	100 yd (91 m)	Seven utility poles were damaged along with lightweight buildings as the tornado impacted the outskirts of Silverton.
EF0	NE of Silverton (1st tornado)	Briscoe	TX	34.54°N 101.22°W	23:03–23:14	4.75 mi (7.64 km)	220 yd (200 m)	A large cone tornado remained over open country with no damage.
EF0	N of South Plains	Floyd	TX	34.25°N 101.32°W	23:03–23:04	0.5 mi (0.80 km)	50 yd (46 m)	A tornado caused light roof damage to an abandoned farm house, but otherwise remained over open farm land.
EF0	NE of Silverton (2nd tornado)	Briscoe	TX	34.67°N 101.2°W	23:10–23:16	1.75 mi (2.82 km)	100 yd (91 m)	A rope tornado, which occurred simultaneously with the large cone tornado near Silverton, remained over open country with no damage.
EF2	N of Quitaque to NW of Brice	Briscoe, Hall, Donley	TX	34.5°N 101.5°W	23:35–00:09	17.5 mi (28.2 km)	300 yd (270 m)	A large multiple-vortex tornado destroyed a mobile home and tore the roof off a house. A barn and two windmills were destroyed as well.
EF0	SW of Clarendon	Donley	TX	34.7971°N 101.062°W	23:40–23:50	1 mi (1.6 km)	100 yd (91 m)	A brief tornado remained in an open field with no damage reported.
EF0	SSE of Sharon Springs	Wallace	KS	38.8533°N 101.7158°W	23:49−23:50	0.5 mi (0.80 km)	10 yd (9.1 m)	A brief tornado remained in an open field with no damage reported.
EF0	Eastern Sharon Springs	Wallace	KS	38.88°N 101.73°W	23:52–00:07	6 mi (9.7 km)	75 yd (69 m)	Minor damage occurred on the east side of Sharon Springs before the tornado moved over open country.
EF1	W of Clarendon	Donley	TX	34.7697°N 100.9809°W	23:55–00:11	7.27 mi (11.70 km)	150 yd (140 m)	One house was damaged on the south side of US 287.
EF2	ESE of Beaver	Beaver	OK	36.728°N 100.4051°W	00:04–00:21	6 mi (9.7 km)	100 yd (91 m)	This tornado struck a ranch, where several utility trailers were tossed considerable distances, and a horse trailer was tossed over 150 yd (140 m). Several power poles and trees were snapped at the base, and a grain bin was destroyed, with part of it carried over 100 yd (91 m) away.
EF0	Eastern Jennings	Decatur	KS	39.6187°N 100.2003°W	00:05–00:20	8 mi (13 km)	25 yd (23 m)	Tree damage occurred and several grain bins were destroyed on the east side of town.
EF0	S of Merriman	Cherry	NE	42.5193°N 101.9259°W	00:12–00:17	3 mi (4.8 km)	150 yd (140 m)	Tree tops were snapped off, and a door was ripped off of a house on a ranch.
EF2	E of Booker, TX to E of Elmwood, OK	Lipscomb (TX), Beaver (OK)	TX, OK	36.45°N 100.4401°W	00:16–00:54	22 mi (35 km)	150 yd (140 m)	2 deaths – A long-lived, multiple-vortex tornado caused no damage in Texas before crossing into Oklahoma, destroying grain bins and outbuildings. Large trees and power poles were snapped, and a house was destroyed, killing the couple inside who took refuge in their small bathroom. A nearby barn was destroyed, and two vehicles were moved 20 yd (18 m). A horse trailer was also thrown 50 yd (46 m). The tornado downed additional trees, power lines, and fences before dissipating.
EF0	SE of Meade	Meade	KS	37.25°N 100.29°W	00:28–00:32	1.4 mi (2.3 km)	50 yd (46 m)	A brief tornado remained in an open field with no damage reported.
EF0	NE of Meade	Meade	KS	37.33°N 100.27°W	00:32–00:35	1.3 mi (2.1 km)	50 yd (46 m)	A brief tornado remained in an open field with no damage reported.
EF0	NE of Coolidge to SW of Tribune	Hamilton, Greeley	KS	38.12°N 101.88°W	00:33–01:04	21.6 mi (34.8 km)	100 yd (91 m)	A long-tracked tornado remained over open country with no reported damage.
EF0	SSE of Goodland	Sherman	KS	39.2031°N 101.6414°W	00:37–00:38	0.5 mi (0.80 km)	10 yd (9.1 m)	A brief tornado remained in an open field with no damage reported.
EF3	W of Jericho	Donley, Gray	TX	35.13°N 100.94°W	00:39–00:54	6.35 mi (10.22 km)	600 yd (550 m)	In Donley County, a horse barn was heavily damaged, a steel fence was bent, and a boxcar and nearby feeding trough were thrown 100 yards (91 m). A mobile home sustained minor damage, and a large house lost a substantial portion of its roof. A property owner in this area also reported that irrigation pivot tires weighing 300 pounds were relocated, and a 1,500 pound fertilizer tank that was one quarter full was missing. As the tornado crossed I-40, three semi-trucks were tossed around, with the driver and his wife sucked out of one of them. Both were seriously injured, and the contents of the truck were scattered up to a mile away. In Gray County, two additional injuries occurred, and metal roofing was torn from barns and outbuildings before the tornado dissipated.
EF1	W of Fowler to Ensign	Meade, Gray	KS	37.38°N 100.25°W	00:42–01:05	13.47 mi (21.68 km)	125 yd (114 m)	Tornado damaged trees, a barn, and an irrigation pivot.
EF2	NW of Hedley	Donley	TX	34.93°N 100.74°W	00:46–00:55	4.15 mi (6.68 km)	528 yd (483 m)	Initially, the tornado only damaged a tin roof, fences, and tree limbs. The tornado then intensified and caused significant damage to a house and an attached garage, and snapped multiple tree trunks at the base. A large barn was completely swept away, with debris scattered 500 yd (460 m) downwind, and a hitch trailer stored inside was carried away and deposited in a tree. Several power poles were snapped and carried up to 20 yd (18 m) away. A van was displaced into a grove of trees near the end of the path.
EF0	SE of Goodland	Sherman	KS	39.2989°N 101.6539°W	00:49–00:50	0.5 mi (0.80 km)	10 yd (9.1 m)	A brief tornado remained in an open field with no damage reported.
EF0	ESE of Ensign to S of Howell	Ford	KS	37.6325°N 100.18°W	00:58–01:12	7.8 mi (12.6 km)	50 yd (46 m)	A tornado caused minor tree damage.
EF0	N of Hedley	Donley	TX	35.029°N 100.67°W	01:02–01:04	0.25 mi (0.40 km)	50 yd (46 m)	A brief tornado remained in an open field with no damage reported.
EF1	W of Arthur	Arthur	NE	41.4064°N 101.9183°W	01:05–01:35	20.61 mi (33.17 km)	100 yd (91 m)	Damage was limited to trees.
EF0	NW of Imperial	Chase	NE	40.6631°N 101.8185°W	01:05	0.1 mi (0.16 km)	20 yd (18 m)	A brief tornado remained in an open field with no damage reported.
EF0	N of Edson (1st tornado)	Sherman	KS	39.3589°N 101.55°E	01:06–01:11	3 mi (4.8 km)	25 yd (23 m)	A weak tornado moved over open fields, causing no damage.
EF1	WSW of Tribune to S of Weskan	Greeley, Wallace	KS	38.4423°N 101.8353°W	01:09–01:53	23 mi (37 km)	100 yd (91 m)	Three unoccupied mobile homes were damaged by this long-lived tornado.
EF1	NE of Lamar to SSE of Brandon	Chase, Perkins	NE	40.6922°N 101.82°W	01:11–01:14	2.48 mi (3.99 km)	20 yd (18 m)	Power poles were snapped.
EF0	SE of Brandon	Perkins	NE	40.71°N 101.76°W	01:12	0.2 mi (0.32 km)	20 yd (18 m)	A brief tornado remained in an open field with no damage reported.
EF2	NE of Jericho	Donley	TX	35.12°N 100.78°W	01:13–01:24	4.53 mi (7.29 km)	200 yd (180 m)	A strong tornado initially caused tree and fence damage before striking a home, tearing the roof off and scattering debris up to a mile away. The walls of the house were made of reinforced concrete, preventing any further damage at that location. Numerous large trees were snapped and defoliated, and several power poles were snapped as well. 200 yd (180 m) of barbed-wire fence was reportedly rolled into a ball at one location.
EF1	NW of Ensign	Gray	KS	37.67°N 100.25°W	01:14–01:31	10.4 mi (16.7 km)	200 yd (180 m)	Irrigation sprinklers, sheds, barns, garages, trees and a corral were damaged.
EF2	NE of Goodland to NW of Bird City	Sherman, Cheyenne	KS	39.4829°N 101.548°W	01:15–02:17	34 mi (55 km)	700 yd (640 m)	In Sherman County, numerous trees and 15 power poles were snapped by this large, long-tracked tornado. In Cheyenne County, four homes had their roofs torn off, with some damage to exterior walls noted. Garages, outbuildings, and grain bins were destroyed as well. Additionally, 22 mule deer, 50 ducks, 4 pheasants, 4 rabbits and 2 song birds were killed according to wildlife officials.
EF0	SE of Alanreed	Donley	TX	35.087°N 100.675°W	01:15–01:18	1 mi (1.6 km)	50 yd (46 m)	A brief tornado remained in an open field with no damage reported.
EF2	W of Grant	Perkins	NE	40.7598°N 101.7693°W	01:20–01:52	15.93 mi (25.64 km)	900 yd (820 m)	A large wedge tornado damaged three farms. Outbuildings, barns, and grain bins were destroyed, and one farmhouse had its roof torn off, while another had a hole torn in its roof. Trees and power poles were snapped, and irrigation pivots were overturned as well.
EF1	SSW of Grant	Perkins	NE	40.7598°N 101.78°W	01:20–01:52	2.34 mi (3.77 km)	30 yd (27 m)	A second tornado formed to the west of the EF2 tornado above and tracked northeast before dissipating as the other one became dominant. Power poles were broken.
EF2	SE of McLean	Gray	TX	35.2096°N 100.575°W	01:23–01:38	3.61 mi (5.81 km)	200 yd (180 m)	A mesonet weather station recorded a wind gust of around 127 mph (204 km/h), and a Texas Department of Transportation meteorological tower was bent at a ninety degree angle to the ground. A nearby veterinary clinic had a highway sign impaled through one of its exterior walls and lost part of its tin roof. A barn was destroyed, outbuildings were damaged, a house sustained major roof damage, and a satellite dish was damaged as well. The approach of the tornado prompted the issuance of a tornado emergency for McLean.
EF0	SE of Lefors	Gray	TX	35.4198°N 100.8075°W	01:30	0.25 mi (0.40 km)	50 yd (46 m)	This tornado was spawned by the same storm that produced the Jericho tornado. A semi-truck was pushed into a guardrail along SH 273 and tree limbs were snapped.
EF1	N of Howell to W of Jetmore	Ford, Hodgeman	KS	37.9015°N 100.1525°W	01:32–01:56	10.72 mi (17.25 km)	200 yd (180 m)	A tornado damaged trees and power poles.
EF1	NE of Lefors	Gray	TX	35.4402°N 100.8075°W	01:36–01:37	0.25 mi (0.40 km)	50 yd (46 m)	Several garages were damaged and one was completely destroyed. A travel trailer near the destroyed garage was thrown 40 yd (37 m) and destroyed. Large tree branches and power poles were snapped, and fences were damaged as well. A large antique car was moved approximately 15 yd (14 m) and was rotated cyclonically from its original position. Two large tanks weighing 2,000 pounds each were moved 75 yd (69 m).
EF0	Meade State Park	Meade	KS	37.0041°N 100.2736°W	01:39–01:58	8.7 mi (14.0 km)	100 yd (91 m)	A tornado remained over open fields with no damage reported.
EF3	NNE of McLean	Gray	TX	35.3235°N 100.5526°W	01:45–02:00	7.99 mi (12.86 km)	1,760 yd (1,610 m)	This large wedge tornado, which was 1 mi (1.6 km) wide at times and moved at up to 45 mph (72 km/h), formed after the previous tornado near McLean dissipated. Wooden high-tension power poles were snapped off at the base, and trees were completely debarked, with only the stubs of the largest branches remaining. A residence at the outer edge of the circulation had metal roofing peeled back, a porch blown off, and a brick chimney collapsed. A nearby bunkhouse lost its roof. Elsewhere, an anchored large steel feed bunk was pulled out of the ground.
EF1	S of Ashby	Grant	NE	41.8754°N 101.92°W	01:46–01:50	2 mi (3.2 km)	100 yd (91 m)	Power lines, trees and fences were damaged, and cattle feeding equipment was moved.
EF1	E of Bird City to W of McDonald	Cheyenne	KS	39.75°N 101.4548°W	01:49–01:56	4 mi (6.4 km)	100 yd (91 m)	This was a satellite tornado was to the large EF2 Bird City tornado. Four power poles were snapped.
EF3	Holly to S of Towner	Prowers, Kiowa	CO	38.02°N 102.12°W	01:54–02:35	28 mi (45 km)	900 yd (820 m)	2 deaths – A large tornado began in Prowers County and rapidly intensified to EF3 strength, devastating the town of Holly where up to 200 structures were damaged or destroyed, and some block-foundation homes were swept away. Extensive tree damage occurred, and vehicles were thrown as well. One of the fatalities occurred in a mobile home while the other occurred in a permanent home. In the northeast part of the county, the tornado inflicted high-end EF3 damage to a ranch. Damage in Kiowa County was limited to EF2 damage to power poles. Nine people were injured.
EF0	NW of Ogallala	Keith	NE	41.05°N 101.85°W	02:00	0.1 mi (0.16 km)	20 yd (18 m)	A brief tornado remained in an open field with no damage reported.
EF3	W of Jetmore to NE of Beeler	Hodgeman, Ness	KS	38.08°N 100.0736°W	02:01–02:50	29.09 mi (46.82 km)	1,320 yd (1,210 m)	A large, long-tracked wedge tornado formed after the EF1 tornado near Jetmore dissipated. It damaged or destroyed nine homes, snapped hundreds of trees and power poles, and destroyed irrigation pivots and barns. A wedding book registry from one of the destroyed residences in Hodgeman County was found 34 mi (55 km) away, while debris from a shed in the same county was found 40 mi (64 km) to the north. A large oil tank was tossed onto a road, and 90 head of cattle were killed.
EF1	SE of Benkelman, NE	Cheyenne (KS), Dundy (NE)	KS, NE	39.9103°N 101.4435°W	02:09–02:36	15 mi (24 km)	400 yd (370 m)	A tornado touched down in Kansas and moved into Nebraska as the large EF2 Bird City tornado was dissipating to its west. A house lost its roof, and a barn and several other outbuildings were destroyed. A golf course suffered significant tree damage, and several houses were damaged at that location as well. Grain bins were also destroyed.
EF1	Western Ogallala	Keith	NE	41.1205°N 101.7497°W	02:11–02:14	0.69 mi (1.11 km)	20 yd (18 m)	A tornado destroyed outbuildings and a garage, snapped trees and power lines, damaged roofs, and overturned horse trailers.
EF0	N of Ogallala	Keith	NE	41.19°N 101.71°W	02:20	0.1 mi (0.16 km)	20 yd (18 m)	A brief tornado caused minor roof damage to homes and snapped tree limbs.
EF0	E of Edson	Sherman	KS	39.33°N 101.4752°W	02:29–02:34	2.5 mi (4.0 km)	25 yd (23 m)	A brief tornado was observed with power flashes being noted as it passed over power poles.
EF3	E of Miami to W of Canadian	Hemphill	TX	35.6863°N 100.4891°W	02:30–02:55	7.77 mi (12.50 km)	1,408 yd (1,287 m)	1 death – A large tornado moved through an oil drilling location, tossing a mobile home 100 yd (91 m) and destroying it. A nearby semi-trailer was blown over and a railroad boxcar was rolled 150 yd (140 m). A structure used to lift the oil-well casing onto the oil derrick was also blown down and severely damaged, and numerous power poles were snapped nearby. At another drilling site further along the path, a mobile home was rolled over and two fifth-wheel trailers were blown 30–40 yd (27–37 m) away, fatally injuring a person inside one of the trailers. Numerous large trees were snapped, including some that landed on a home at the edge of the circulation. Another well-built house lost much of its roof, and a nearby 6,000 pound feed storage bunk was blown over. The tornado then derailed 50 cars on a BNSF freight train before dissipating. In addition to the fatality, one person was injured.
EF1	ENE of Towner, CO	Kiowa (CO), Greeley (KS)	CO, KS	38.4603°N 102.0501°W	02:40–03:01	11.62 mi (18.70 km)	440 yd (400 m)	This tornado touched down in Colorado and moved into Kansas after the Holly EF3 tornado dissipated. Damage was limited to the destruction of four power poles in Colorado with little to no damage occurring in Kansas.
EF0	NE of Edson	Sherman	KS	39.3709°N 101.4971°W	02:54–02:55	0.5 mi (0.80 km)	10 yd (9.1 m)	A tornado remained over open fields with no damage reported.
EF0	S of Weskan	Wallace	KS	38.7977°N 101.97°W	03:09–03:10	0.5 mi (0.80 km)	10 yd (9.1 m)	A brief tornado remained in an open field with no damage reported.
EF0	Eastern Bird City	Cheyenne	KS	39.7398°N 101.5167°W	03:24–03:28	2 mi (3.2 km)	25 yd (23 m)	A brief tornado remained in open fields with no damage reported.

=== March 29 event ===
List of confirmed tornadoes – Thursday, March 29, 2007
EF#	Location	County / Parish	State	Start Coord.	Time (UTC)	Path length	Max width	Summary
EF1	ESE of Okeene	Blaine	OK	36.1°N 98.36°W	20:05–20:10	2.3 mi (3.7 km)	20 yd (18 m)	Barns and garages were heavily damaged, tree limbs were snapped, and grain bins were thrown. Debris from the damaged structures was scattered up to 2,000 feet away.
EF2	E of Yukon to SE of Piedmont	Canadian	OK	35.5°N 97.71°W	21:05–21:25	7.5 mi (12.1 km)	50 yd (46 m)	Numerous homes were damaged, some heavily. Several travel trailers and a boat were rolled, outbuildings were destroyed, and hardwood trees and power poles were snapped. Three large electrical transmission towers were damaged, and a large metal building was severely damaged. Two people were injured in one of the destroyed travel trailers while three others were also injured when their vehicles were flipped on the Kilpatrick Turnpike.
EF0	WNW of Hillsdale	Garfield, Grant	OK	36.57°N 98.03°W	21:20–21:30	3 mi (4.8 km)	20 yd (18 m)	Barns and sheds were damaged, trees were uprooted, feeding troughs were tossed, and a metal gate was blown over.

=== March 30 event ===
List of confirmed tornadoes – Friday, March 30, 2007
EF#	Location	County / Parish	State	Start Coord.	Time (UTC)	Path length	Max width	Summary
EF0	NW of Woodcreek	Hays	TX	30.14°N 98.22°W	15:03–15:05	0.2 mi (0.32 km)	50 yd (46 m)	A brief tornado touched down with no damage being reported.
EF0	SW of Dripping Springs	Hays	TX	30.12°N 98.17°W	15:25–15:28	0.3 mi (0.48 km)	50 yd (46 m)	A brief tornado touched down with no damage being reported.
EF0	S of Carbon	Eastland	TX	32.24°N 98.83°W	16:20–16:22	1 mi (1.6 km)	30 yd (27 m)	A brief tornado touched down with no damage being reported.
EF0	E of Sweetwater	Nolan, Fisher	TX	32.47°N 100.21°W	17:02–17:10	7.21 mi (11.60 km)	75 yd (69 m)	A tornado turned over a tractor trailer rig on I-20, injuring the driver. Tree and power pole damage occurred further along the path.
EF0	WNW of Huckabay	Erath	TX	32.38°N 98.44°W	17:43–17:44	1 mi (1.6 km)	30 yd (27 m)	A brief tornado touched down with no damage being reported.
EF0	Fort Hood	Coryell, Bell	TX	31.1°N 97.86°W	20:55–20:59	2.5 mi (4.0 km)	30 yd (27 m)	A tornado crossed a runway at the Robert Gray Army Airfield without causing any damage. ASOS on the runway measured a 71 mph (114 km/h) wind gust.
EF1	E of Mound	Coryell	TX	31.35°N 97.6°W	21:36–21:40	3.06 mi (4.92 km)	30 yd (27 m)	A few barns and two houses were damaged and trees were downed.
EF1	SW of McGregor	McLennan	TX	31.42°N 97.44°W	21:40–21:45	2 mi (3.2 km)	30 yd (27 m)	The back half of a metal rodeo arena was destroyed.
EF0	Riesel	McLennan	TX	31.48°N 96.93°W	23:00	0.5 mi (0.80 km)	30 yd (27 m)	A brief tornado touched down with no damage being reported.
EF1	Wylie	Collin	TX	33.02°N 96.55°W	02:20–02:22	0.75 mi (1.21 km)	40 yd (37 m)	This tornado developed on the leading edge of a bow echo.Approximately 25 to 30 homes in and south of the Riverchase subdivision suffered substantial damage to roofs and garage doors. Several other homes suffered minor roof damage, broken windows, and fence damage. In addition, several trees along the track were downed. (Note: The NCEI lists this event as an EF0 tornado, but the report summary says the tornado was rated EF1.)
EF0	ENE of Council Grove	Morris	KS	38.68°N 96.39°W	02:28–02:30	2.8 mi (4.5 km)	20 yd (18 m)	A windmill was toppled, a pole shed was destroyed, and a barn was shifted off of its foundation. Tree damage occurred as well.
EF0	SW of Clinton	Douglas	KS	38.86°N 95.46°W	03:39–03:41	2 mi (3.2 km)	30 yd (27 m)	Two trees fell onto a house, which sustained major wind damage to its roof and garage door. Additional tree damage occurred further along the path.

=== March 31 event ===
List of confirmed tornadoes – Saturday, March 31, 2007
EF#	Location	County / Parish	State	Start Coord.	Time (UTC)	Path length	Max width	Summary
EF1	S of Halletsville	Lavaca	TX	29.39°N 96.95°W	09:30–09:34	0.8 mi (1.3 km)	100 yd (91 m)	A mobile home was shifted off of its foundation and a barn was destroyed. Several trees were downed as well.
EF2	SE of Halletsville	Lavaca	TX	29.39°N 96.88°W	09:45–09:50	0.4 mi (0.64 km)	75 yd (69 m)	This low-end EF2 tornado obliterated a mobile home, with only the twisted metal frame remaining. Four people inside were thrown 150 feet (46 m) but survived with minor injuries. A truck parked nearby was rolled and crushed.
EF1	W of Herman	Washington (Note: The NCEI report map incorrectly places the tornado Dodge County)	NE	41.67°N 96.56°W	19:35–19:36	1 mi (1.6 km)	440 yd (400 m)	Sheds were damaged, a horse barn was nearly destroyed, and trees and fences were damaged.
EF0	NW of Oelwein	Fayette	IA	41.27°N 91.93°W	21:58–21:59	0.25 mi (0.40 km)	75 yd (69 m)	A tornado touched down briefly on a farm, destroying a 100-year-old barn, damaged a garage, a machine shed, a windmill, and a few trees and blew out the windows of the farmhouse.
EF1	N of Delaware	Delaware, Clayton	IA	42.55°N 91.35°W	22:29–22:41	11.85 mi (19.07 km)	200 yd (180 m)	Considerable tree damage occurred, and outbuildings were damaged. On one farm, a dairy barn collapsed, killing 24 cows and temporarily trapping two people. A two car garage was blown off of its foundation with minor damage to the home right next to it. On another farm, a machine shed was destroyed and boards were impaled into the ground.
EF0	St. Louis	City of St. Louis	MO	38.61°N 90.25°W	22:50–22:52	1.71 mi (2.75 km)	60 yd (55 m)	A weak tornado developed inside a squall line, touching down four times on an intermittent path. After damaging the roofs of three homes, it struck the Saint Louis University Medical Center. Tree limbs were downed and a building sustained roof damage. Windows were blown out at two parking garage nearby. Towards the end of the path, a billboard and traffic lights were damaged. Two people driving on I-64 suffered minor injures and were hospitalized after they were hit by flying debris. Tree damage occurred along the entire path of the tornado.
EF0	ENE of Potosi	Grant	WI	42.69°N 90.68°W	23:18–23:19	0.25 mi (0.40 km)	50 yd (46 m)	A weak tornado caused minor damage to a few buildings and downed a few trees.

== See also ==
- List of North American tornadoes and tornado outbreaks
- Tornadoes of 2007
