= List of United States tornadoes from January to February 2007 =

This is a list of all tornadoes that were confirmed by local offices of the National Weather Service in the United States from January to February 2007.

== United States Yearly Total ==
Confirmed tornadoes by Enhanced Fujita rating
EFU	EF0	EF1	EF2	EF3	EF4	EF5	Total
0	675	298	91	27	4	1	1,096

- Note: January tornadoes were rated using the old Fujita scale, but are included in the chart above by matching the F rating to the related EF scale rating.

== January ==
Confirmed tornadoes by Fujita rating
FU	F0	F1	F2	F3	F4	F5	Total
0	7	11	3	0	0	0	21

=== January 4 event ===
List of confirmed tornadoes – Thursday, January 4, 2007 (Note: All dates are based on the local time zone where the tornado touched down; however, all times are in Coordinated Universal Time for consistency.)
EF#	Location	County / Parish	State	Start Coord.	Time (UTC)	Path length	Max width	Summary
F1	Lydia to Loreauville	Iberia	LA	29.919°N 91.798°W	21:45–21:52	15.07 mi (24.25 km)	100 yd (91 m)	2 deaths – Four mobile homes were destroyed, with three of them being flipped. Several brick houses sustained major damage and many trees were downed. 15 additional people were injured.
F1	Oscar	Pointe Coupee	LA	30.6°N 91.45°W	22:35–22:40	1.83 mi (2.95 km)	75 yd (69 m)	Dozens of homes were damaged, with the roofs being removed from two homes and another being demolished.

=== January 5 event ===
List of confirmed tornadoes – Friday, January 5, 2007
EF#	Location	County / Parish	State	Start Coord.	Time (UTC)	Path length	Max width	Summary
F1	SSW of Soso	Jones	MS	31.7296°N 89.294°W	06:27–06:29	1.2 mi (1.9 km)	100 yd (91 m)	Brief tornado downed several trees and power lines. A storage building was damaged, a mobile homes was shifted of its support blocks, and another mobile home suffered roof damage.
F0	Wiggins	Stone	MS	30.85°N 89.13°W	06:40–06:42	0.36 mi (0.58 km)	50 yd (46 m)	The roof of a fire station had some minor damage, the roof of an old train depot was blown off, and several metal buildings were damaged.
F1	W of Union	Newton, Neshoba	MS	32.54°N 89.27°W	06:57–07:05	4.93 mi (7.93 km) (Note: The report summary says the tornado traveled 5.3 mi (8.5 km), but the official path length is 4.93 mi (7.93 km).)	300 yd (270 m)	Four chicken houses were destroyed and one house sustained minor damage. Several trees were downed and three additional homes were damaged, with one losing its roof.
F1	NE of Neville	Neshoba	MS	32.6241°N 89.2283°W	07:07–07:10	3 mi (4.8 km)	400 yd (370 m)	This tornado quickly developed after the previous one dissipated. Numerous trees were snapped and uprooted, two houses suffered roof and wall damage, and several outbuildings were destroyed.
F2	NE of Tucker	Neshoba	MS	32.7211°N 89.03°W	07:25–07:27	1.4 mi (2.3 km)	150 yd (140 m)	A brick house had its entire roof removed and a large outbuilding was destroyed by this brief, but strong tornado. Numerous trees were snapped and uprooted as well.
F2	Blackwater	Kemper	MS	32.6145°N 88.6959°W	07:40–07:44	2.24 mi (3.60 km)	250 yd (230 m)	Five mobile homes and one modular home were destroyed. A vehicle was flipped and trees and power lines were downed as well. Nine people were injured.
F1	WNW of Shuqualak	Noxubee	MS	32.9977°N 88.6596°W	08:05–08:09	3.7 mi (6.0 km)	300 yd (270 m)	Many trees and power lines were downed. One house suffered minor roof damage.
F1	S of Sargent	Coweta	GA	33.3632°N 84.9031°W	15:05–15:08	5.39 mi (8.67 km)	200 yd (180 m)	Many large trees were downed, some of which fell on homes, and numerous structures were damaged. The damage to the structures included: damage to the roof of a barn, a destroyed greenhouse, minor roof, gutter, and siding damage to at least 30 houses, and several damaged or destroyed outbuildings.
F0	Southern Senoia	Coweta	GA	33.2733°N 84.5632°W	16:00–16:02	1.68 mi (2.70 km)	200 yd (180 m)	Many large trees were downed, a mobile home was destroyed, and a car was damaged.
F1	Liberty	Pickens	SC	34.78°N 82.68°W	19:24	0.1 mi (0.16 km)	20 yd (18 m)	A brief tornado touched down in the parking lot of Liberty Elementary School. Nine vehicles were severely damaged, with four being lifted off of the ground and flipped. A shed was blown over as well. 15 people were injured, most of whom were parents in cars inside the parking lot who were waiting for the school dismissal.
F0	NW of Moore	Spartanburg	SC	34.8556°N 82.0311°W	20:11–20:12	0.25 mi (0.40 km)	50 yd (46 m)	Two sheds were destroyed and the roof was partially blown off of another shed. Part of the deck was torn away from a house and several pine trees were snapped.
F0	ESE of Gastonia	Gaston	NC	35.2423°N 81.0982°W	21:39–21:40	0.25 mi (0.40 km)	20 yd (18 m)	Eight homes sustained minor roof damage and some outbuildings were also damaged.
F0	Dixie Union	Ware	GA	31.32°N 82.47°W	22:10–22:15	2 mi (3.2 km)	100 yd (91 m)	Numerous trees were downed and several mobile homes had siding stripped off. Another structure was destroyed.

=== January 7 event ===
List of confirmed tornadoes – Sunday, January 7, 2007
EF#	Location	County / Parish	State	Start Coord.	Time (UTC)	Path length	Max width	Summary
F1	SE of Barnesville	Tallapoosa	AL	32.676°N 85.8°W	22:10–22:12	1 mi (1.6 km)	50 yd (46 m)	Several houses were damaged, a mobile home was destroyed, and about 40 trees were downed.
F2	W of Moreland	Coweta	GA	33.2857°N 84.9009°W	23:39–23:45	4.11 mi (6.61 km)	200 yd (180 m)	One home was destroyed, with several others suffering minor to moderate damage. Several trees and power lines were downed, the awning of a convenience store was damaged, and several storage sheds were destroyed. Several residents were trapped in their damaged homes, but they were all rescued safely with no injuries being reported.
F0	NW of Ozark	Dale	AL	31.4904°N 85.6973°W	01:50–01:52	0.5 mi (0.80 km)	50 yd (46 m)	Weak tornado damaged two structures and downed several trees.
F1	NW of White Oak	Henry, Barbour	AL	31.7585°N 85.17°W	02:29–02:34	2.69 mi (4.33 km)	200 yd (180 m)	Hundreds of trees were snapped or uprooted and several mobile homes were damaged or destroyed.

=== January 12 event ===
List of confirmed tornadoes – Friday, January 12, 2007
EF#	Location	County / Parish	State	Start Coord.	Time (UTC)	Path length	Max width	Summary
F0	SW of Troy	Bell	TX	31.1898°N 97.312°W	22:35–22:40	1.47 mi (2.37 km)	35 yd (32 m)	A few houses suffered roof damage.

=== January 13 event ===
List of confirmed tornadoes – Saturday, January 13, 2007
EF#	Location	County / Parish	State	Start Coord.	Time (UTC)	Path length	Max width	Summary
F1	San Marcos	Hays	TX	29.8734°N 97.9307°W	13:08–13:10	0.75 mi (1.21 km)	200 yd (180 m)	One structure lost its roof, brick was removed from another building, and several trailers/mobile homes were slammed into each other and severely damaged. A large dumpster was spun around, power lines were downed, and 35 vehicles were damaged. This was the last tornado to be rated on the Fujita Scale in the United States.

== February ==
February 1, 2007 marked the changeover to the Enhanced Fujita Scale.

Confirmed tornadoes by Enhanced Fujita rating
EFU	EF0	EF1	EF2	EF3	EF4	EF5	Total
0	22	20	6	4	1	0	53

=== February 2 event ===
List of confirmed tornadoes – Friday, February 2, 2007
EF#	Location	County / Parish	State	Start Coord.	Time (UTC)	Path length	Max width	Summary
EF3	E of Wildwood to E of Lady Lake	Sumter, Lake	FL	28.8815°N 82.0457°W	08:10–08:25	16.17 mi (26.02 km)	450 yd (410 m)	8 deaths – The first tornado from the main supercell began near Wildwood and moved across the south side of The Villages, where numerous frame homes were damaged or destroyed. The tornado then struck the neighboring town of Lady Lake, where numerous mobile homes were obliterated and Lady Lake Church was completely destroyed. Numerous trees were snapped and uprooted, and several greenhouses were destroyed further along the path before the tornado dissipated. 1,246 homes and mobile homes were damaged, and 301 others were destroyed. In addition to the fatalities, an additional 25 people were injured. This was the first tornado to occur after implementation of the Enhanced Fujita Scale. The tornado caused $114 million in damage.
EF3	SW of Paisley to E of DeLand	Lake, Volusia	FL	28.9588°N 81.5871°W	08:37–09:10	26.03 mi (41.89 km)	450 yd (410 m)	13 deaths – After the previous EF3 tornado had dissipated, the supercell produced a second EF3 tornado, the deadliest of the outbreak (the third deadliest tornado in Florida's history behind the Milton F3 tornado in 1962 with 17 fatalities and the Kissimmee tornado of 1998 with 25 fatalities), at 3:37 a.m. EST (08:37 UTC). The high-end EF3 tornado first touched down southwest of Paisley, snapping numerous trees and toppling a radio tower before moving east and striking Lake Mack. Numerous mobile homes and RVs were obliterated, and numerous trees were snapped and debarked, some of which had mobile home frames wrapped around them. The tornado continued east and tore through the south side of DeLand before dissipating. Numerous mobile homes, frame homes, and apartment buildings were damaged or destroyed in DeLand. In all, 421 homes and mobile homes were damaged, and 192 others were destroyed. A total of 51 people injured. Damage totaled $98 million.
EF1	New Smyrna Beach	Volusia	FL	29.0641°N 80.9890°W	09:22–09:27	3.1 mi (5.0 km)	100 yd (91 m)	Many homes sustained structural damage, mainly to roofs and chimneys. Carports, garage doors, and pool screens were damaged as well.
EF0	Frostproof	Polk	FL	27.73°N 81.53°W	13:00–13:04	0.5 mi (0.80 km)	50 yd (46 m)	A house sustained shingle loss, two sheds were blown over, and several citrus trees were downed.

=== February 13 event ===
List of confirmed tornadoes – Tuesday, February 13, 2007
EF#	Location	County / Parish	State	Start Coord.	Time (UTC)	Path length	Max width	Summary
EF1	Flanders to SW of Pilette	Lafayette	LA	30.11°N 92.02°W	06:10–06:15	2.16 mi (3.48 km)	50 yd (46 m)	Two brick homes received significant roof damage. One home had its garage destroyed which caused part of the roof to be ripped off. The neighbors roof was damaged by flying debris. 31 other homes sustained lesser damage, trees were downed, and other debris was blown across fields and into trees along the path as well.
EF2	Ruth to SSW of Henderson	St. Martin	LA	30.235°N 91.865°W	06:36–06:46	4.31 mi (6.94 km)	300 yd (270 m)	The same storm that spawned the previous tornado later spawned this low-end EF2 tornado to the northeast. 80 homes and mobile homes were impacted, 44 of which sustained significant damage or were destroyed. Trees in the area were damaged and uprooted, and 3 people were injured in a small brick home where the roof blew off, causing a brick wall and other debris to land on them. This was the strongest tornado in southwest Louisiana since the November 23, 2004 tornado outbreak.
EF0	ESE of New Iberia	Iberia	LA	29.98°N 91.76°W	07:03–07:04	0.46 mi (0.74 km)	25 yd (23 m)	A mobile home was pushed into a neighbor's car and house.
EF0	NW of Charon	Vermilion	LA	30.03°N 92.04°W	07:25–07:26	0.46 mi (0.74 km)	25 yd (23 m)	A brief tornado destroyed a house that was under construction.
EF2	Westwego to ESE of Metairie	Jefferson, Orleans	LA	29.897°N 90.153°W	08:55–09:08	8.72 mi (14.03 km)	50 yd (46 m)	This strong tornado first touched down in Westwego before crossing the Mississippi River into the northwestern side of New Orleans. Significant damage occurred in the Uptown and Carrollton of the city. Several structures in Westwego were significantly damaged, including a two-story motel building which had its roof removed and a portion of the second floor walls caved in. In New Orleans, the tornado heavily damaged several warehouses, homes, and commercial buildings. The roofs and portions of roofs were removed from a number of houses. The collapse of some exterior walls was also noted. 24 people were injured and damage was estimated at $2 million.
EF2	Gentilly	Orleans	LA	30.0121°N 90.0519°W	09:10–09:12	1.29 mi (2.08 km)	50 yd (46 m)	1 death – A second strong tornado touched down after the previous one dissipated and struck the Pontchartrain Park neighborhood in Gentilly northeast of New Orleans. Several homes sustained considerable structural damage in that area. Extensive damage to trees and power lines occurred before it lifted near the Industrial Canal. Damage was also reported to many FEMA trailers in this area that was devastated by Hurricane Katrina. An 86-year-old woman died from her injuries after her FEMA trailer was destroyed. Roofs were blown off of several homes and the upper portions of two story houses were partially collapsed. 10 other people were injured. In total, the two New Orleans tornadoes destroyed 55 houses and damaged 526 others. Damage was $1 million.
EF1	Lemon	Smith	MS	32.1438°N 89.5106°W	09:52–09:57	1.29 mi (2.08 km)	50 yd (46 m)	One home had some roofing blown off, power poles were blown down and multiple trees were snapped. Another home sustained damage to its porch, and a chicken house also sustained minor roof damage.
EF0	SW of Bassfield	Jefferson Davis	MS	31.4182°N 89.8459°W	10:13–10:16	3 mi (4.8 km)	75 yd (69 m)	A weak tornado downed several trees and broke off tree limbs.
EF0	SE of Poplarville	Pearl River	MS	30.7789°N 89.4705°W	10:45	0.3 mi (0.48 km)	25 yd (23 m)	A brief, weak tornado knocked down a few trees.
EF0	ENE of Ocean Springs	Jackson	MS	30.4477°N 88.7425°W	13:20–13:23	0.3 mi (0.48 km)	25 yd (23 m)	A brief, weak tornado caused no significant damage.
EF1	N of Hosford	Liberty	FL	30.4089°N 84.8°W	20:05–20:06	0.25 mi (0.40 km)	50 yd (46 m)	The roof was blown off of a house and a large shed was destroyed. Numerous pine trees were snapped as well.
EF1	N of Meriwether to N of Edgefield	McCormick, Edgefield	SC	33.65°N 82.17°W	22:47–23:15	31.33 mi (50.42 km)	200 yd (180 m)	In McCormick County, two homes sustained minor damage and several trees were downed. In Edgefield County, numerous other trees were downed, three outbuildings were destroyed, and one other was severely damaged. The tornado was down only intermittently.
EF0	Newbern	Hale, Perry	AL	32.5928°N 87.5715°W	23:01–23:13	6.52 mi (10.49 km)	25 yd (23 m)	Several old barns and metal sheds were lightly damaged, and numerous trees were downed, including at least one that fell onto a mobile home.
EF1	SE of Duncanville to Eoline	Tuscaloosa, Bibb	AL	33.0128°N 87.3994°W	23:10–23:29	9.71 mi (15.63 km)	400 yd (370 m)	Several trailers, homes, barns and sheds were damaged along the path. Additionally, numerous trees were snapped off and downed.
EF1	E of Sylvania	Screven	GA	32.75°N 81.5956°W	23:28–23:29	0.6 mi (0.97 km)	35 yd (32 m)	A pump house was destroyed, a large tree branch fell onto a car, a mobile home and an outbuilding was damaged, and uprooted and snapped several trees. Nearly a dozen large pecan trees were uprooted. Other pecan trees had large limbs broken off, and one person was injured.
EF0	Sixmile	Bibb	AL	33.02°N 87.08°W	23:48–00:01	7.47 mi (12.02 km)	250 yd (230 m)	Sporadic tree and building damage occurred.
EF1	SE of Allendale	Allendale	SC	32.99°N 81.29°W	00:01–00:02	0.03 mi (0.048 km)	30 yd (27 m)	A brief tornado uprooted trees and damaged the skirting of a mobile home.
EF1	NE of Mulberry	Autauga	AL	32.4653°N 86.7469°W	00:22–00:23	1.1 mi (1.8 km)	200 yd (180 m)	Several trees were snapped off and uprooted. The roof of a carport was lifted off and thrown into the front yard of another residence, and a tractor shed in the same area had sheet metal blown off its roof.
EF1	ESE of Olar	Bamberg	SC	33.1391°N 81.1312°W	00:27–00:37	2.01 mi (3.23 km)	40 yd (37 m)	A weak tornado downed several trees.

=== February 23 event ===
List of confirmed tornadoes – Friday, February 23, 2007
EF#	Location	County / Parish	State	Start Coord.	Time (UTC)	Path length	Max width	Summary
EF0	N of McLean	Gray	TX	35.2806°N 100.6°W	00:10–00:11	0.1 mi (0.16 km)	25 yd (23 m)	A brief tornado touchdown over open country resulted in no damage. The path length and width are estimated.
EF0	WNW of Fowler	Meade	KS	37.38°N 100.35°W	03:56–04:06	0.1 mi (0.16 km)	25 yd (23 m)	A weak tornado caused minor tree damage.
EF1	NW of Fowler to WSW of Dodge City	Meade, Gray, Ford	KS	37.4458°N 100.2829°W	04:11–04:40	18.41 mi (29.63 km)	100 yd (91 m)	Five pivot irrigation sprinklers and several outbuildings were damaged. Trees were downed and a 3000-gallon tank was moved about 0.5 miles (0.80 km).

=== February 24 event ===
List of confirmed tornadoes – Saturday, February 24, 2007
EF#	Location	County / Parish	State	Start Coord.	Time (UTC)	Path length	Max width	Summary
EF1	NW of Red Chute	Bossier	LA	32.5916°N 93.6351°W	16:42–16:45	1 mi (1.6 km)	200 yd (180 m)	40 to 50 structures sustained varying degrees of roof damage. One home had a collapsed wall. One person was injured.
EF0	SW of Lucas	Russell	KS	39.0105°N 98.6008°W	19:15–19:16	0.25 mi (0.40 km)	25 yd (23 m)	A brief tornado touched down with no damage being reported.
EF3	Junction City to New London	Union	AR	33.02°N 92.73°W	19:35–19:52	26 mi (42 km)	250 yd (230 m)	Six structures sustained heavy damage, including two mobile homes. Several other structures suffered minor damage and many trees were downed. Five people were injured.
EF2	SE of Moro Bay to SSE of Warren	Bradley, Drew	AR	33.2696°N 92.2821°W	19:58–20:21	21.65 mi (34.84 km)	440 yd (400 m)	This tornado touched down after the previous one dissipated. The most severe damage occurred near Mount Olive. A house suffered major damage and a mobile home was destroyed. Three more houses sustained minor damage and several sheds and outbuildings were destroyed. Thousands of trees were downed, as were many power poles and lines. Six people were injured.
EF3	E of Montongo to Dumas to NE of Pendleton	Drew, Lincoln, Desha, Arkansas	AR	33.7369°N 91.7468°W	20:36–21:07	29.1 mi (46.8 km)	880 yd (800 m)	This long-tracked, intense tornado began near Montongo and moved northeastward through mostly forested area, knocking down and damaging a large number of trees. It then moved through the southeastern part of Dumas, destroying 25 businesses and 19 homes while also damaging an additional 65 homes. Six mobile homes and an athletic park were also destroyed along with an electrical substation, leaving the community without power for days. A community building and an assisted living center were also damaged. The tornado than crossed over more forested areas, knocked down additional trees before passing near the community of Back Gate. A home and 11 mobile homes were destroyed while three other homes were damaged and 12 more mobile homes sustained minor damage. The tornado dissipated shortly thereafter. Many trees and power lines were downed along the path. 28 people were injured.
EF1	N of Spearsville, LA	Union (LA), Union (AR)	LA, AR	32.9893°N 92.6166°W	21:15–21:25	7 mi (11 km)	150 yd (140 m)	Several homes suffered roof damage in Louisiana. In Arkansas, five structures received heavy damage, four of which were chicken houses. Many trees were downed along the path.
EF2	N of Monticello to SE of Garrett Bridge	Drew, Lincoln	AR	33.6951°N 91.8°W	22:01–22:17	14.81 mi (23.83 km)	200 yd (180 m)	In Drew County, many trees were downed, some of which landed on a vehicle and a mobile home, windows were blown out of a house, a metal barn was heavily damaged, and a large metal shop building was destroyed. In Lincoln County, part of a house was destroyed, several other shop buildings sustained damage, and more trees were downed.
EF1	NE of Pendleton	Desha, Arkansas	AR	33.9956°N 91.3492°W	22:30–22:39	8.5 mi (13.7 km)	150 yd (140 m)	A grain storage facility, a few homes, several metal shop buildings, and several trailers/mobile homes were damaged. Several sheds and outbuildings were destroyed and many trees were downed.
EF1	SSW of Selma	Drew	AR	33.6225°N 91.6086°W	22:33–22:34	0.9 mi (1.4 km)	50 yd (46 m)	Several trees were downed.
EF0	North Crossett	Ashley	AR	33.15°N 91.95°W	22:44–22:46	1 mi (1.6 km)	50 yd (46 m)	The tornado moved through a wooded area without damaging any structures.
EF1	Medford to S of Holden	Johnson	MO	38.6477°N 94°W	23:18–23:21	2 mi (3.2 km)	50 yd (46 m)	Two homes, one business, and several farm buildings were damaged. Trees and power lines were downed.
EF1	Southern Indianola	Sunflower	MS	33.3887°N 90.7235°W	00:05–00:14	12 mi (19 km)	150 yd (140 m)	A fast-moving tornado struck the southern side of Indianola as it moved northeastward. Numerous trees, power poles, and metal signs were downed. Several sheds and a carport were destroyed, a church lost part of its roof, a fence was damaged, and an irrigation pivot was flipped.
EF0	N of Schlater	Leflore	MS	33.6602°N 90.3623°W	00:26–00:28	1 mi (1.6 km)	40 yd (37 m)	One mobile home had its roof blown off, while another suffered minor damage as the tornado moved over a mostly open field.
EF2	S of Jonesville	Catahoula, Concordia	LA	31.6055°N 91.83°W	01:13–1:38	17.33 mi (27.89 km)	500 yd (460 m)	A tornado touched down in Catahoula Parish, where it heavily damaged or destroyed 6 mobile homes and caused minor damage to 3 others at EF1 intensity. It also downed dozens of trees before crossing the Tensas River into Concordia Parish, where it strengthened to EF2 intensity. It downed many trees in a heavily wooded area before crossing the river back into Catahoula Parish, downing more trees. It finally crossed the river back into Concordia Parish once more where it mangled hundreds of trees, downed power lines, and destroyed two mobile homes before lifting.
EF1	SE of Brandon	Rankin	MS	32.2189°N 89.9196°W	03:47–03:48	1 mi (1.6 km)	75 yd (69 m)	Numerous trees were downed.
EF1	SE of Lake to NW of Lawrence	Newton	MS	32.32°N 89.2984°W	04:40–04:43	3.5 mi (5.6 km)	150 yd (140 m)	Many trees were downed, some of which blocked the eastbound lanes of I-10 as the tornado crossed the interstate.

=== February 25 event ===
List of confirmed tornadoes – Sunday, February 25, 2007
EF#	Location	County / Parish	State	Start Coord.	Time (UTC)	Path length	Max width	Summary
EF0	Southern Elk Grove	Sacramento	CA	38.39°N 121.37°W	20:24–20:26	1 mi (1.6 km)	5 yd (4.6 m)	A very weak tornado downed trees and power poles and damaged fences and a rooftop solar panel.

=== February 28 event ===
List of confirmed tornadoes – Wednesday, February 28, 2007
EF#	Location	County / Parish	State	Start Coord.	Time (UTC)	Path length	Max width	Summary
EF0	Tamarac to Lauderhill	Broward	FL	26.2°N 80.22°W	18:55–19:00	2.17 mi (3.49 km)	100 yd (91 m)	A roof and a porch screen were damaged, and tree branches were broken.
EF0	W of Neosho Falls (1st tornado)	Woodson	KS	38°N 95.59°W	00:33–00:36	0.25 mi (0.40 km)	50 yd (46 m)	This was the first of two simultaneous, short-lived, rope tornadoes that did not cause damage.
EF0	W of Neosho Falls (2nd tornado)	Woodson	KS	38°N 95.59°W	00:33–00:36	0.25 mi (0.40 km)	50 yd (46 m)	This was the second of two simultaneous, short-lived, rope tornadoes that did not cause damage.
EF0	WSW of Colony	Anderson	KS	38.0534°N 95.4209°W	00:53–00:54	1.17 mi (1.88 km)	50 yd (46 m)	This tornado remained over open country and did not cause damage.
EF0	N of Carlyle (1st tornado)	Allen	KS	38.01°N 95.4°W	01:01–01:03	0.1 mi (0.16 km)	20 yd (18 m)	A brief rope tornado touched down in an open field and did not cause damage.
EF1	E of Colony to E of Welda	Anderson	KS	38.07°N 95.3401°W	01:05–01:22	9.42 mi (15.16 km)	440 yd (400 m)	Greater than 40 structures were damaged, mostly minor. Many trees and power lines were downed, and numerous outbuildings were destroyed. A barn was also destroyed, and a few houses suffered major structural damage. Windows were blown out of numerous homes and vehicles, and a large metal horse arena with steel girders and concrete footings was lifted out of the ground and destroyed. A horse and rider were thrown about 100 feet (30 m) but were uninjured. Another horse was injured when it had a steel pipe driven through its head. An old railroad car - being used as a shed at that time - was rolled three times and smashed multiple fences.
EF0	N of Carlyle (2nd tornado)	Allen	KS	38.0301°N 95.4°W	01:07–01:09	0.25 mi (0.40 km)	250 yd (230 m)	Three tornadoes combined into a larger tornado that remained over open country and did not cause damage.
EF4	E of Selma to Trading Post	Anderson, Linn	KS	38.13°N 95.1°W	01:24–02:10	28.01 mi (45.08 km)	800 yd (730 m)	A large wedge tornado touched down in Anderson County, downing trees and flattening grasses with weak EF0 intensity. It moved into Linn County where a farmhouse was swept away, with only the basement remaining. Several other houses and farm buildings were damaged or destroyed as it passed well north of Blue Mound and Mound City. The occupants of the house that sustained EF4 damage were in a storm cellar at the time and were not injured. Extensive tree and power line damage was reported in Linn County before the tornado lifted north-northeast of Pleasanton. This was the first tornado to be rated EF4 on the newly implemented Enhanced Fujita Scale.
EF1	ESE of Amsterdam to Burdett	Bates	MO	38.3334°N 94.5289°W	02:27–02:37	12.87 mi (20.71 km)	100 yd (91 m)	The same storm that produced the EF4 tornado in Linn County, Kansas later produced this tornado. Major damage was reported to one house and minor damage to several other structures. Trees and power lines were downed.
EF1	E of Gunn City/Hadsell to SW of Kingsville	Cass, Johnson	MO	38.67°N 94.1515°W	04:05–04:14	6.23 mi (10.03 km)	50 yd (46 m)	A mobile home was destroyed, and two houses and a garage were damaged.

== See also ==
- Tornadoes of 2007
- List of United States tornadoes in March 2007
