= Sargent, Georgia =

Unincorporated community in Georgia, U.S.

Coordinates: 33.376°N 84.788°W

Sargent is an unincorporated community in Coweta County, in the U.S. state of Georgia. The ZIP Code for Sargent is 30275.

== History ==
An old variant name was "Lodi". A post office called Lodi was established in 1835, and the name was changed to Sargent in 1892. The present name is after brothers George and Captain H. J. Sargent, proprietors of a local cotton mill.
