= Spring Hill, Santa Rosa County, Florida =

Spring Hill, Florida
- Census-designated place
- Location within Florida Location within the United States
- Coordinates: 30°46′03″N 86°56′30″W
- Country: United States
- State: Florida
- County: Santa Rosa

Area
  - Total: 12.523 sq mi (32.43 km^{2})
  - Land: 12.521 sq mi (32.43 km^{2})
  - Water: 0.002 sq mi (0.0052 km^{2})
- Elevation: 200 ft (61 m)

Population (2020)
  - Total: 169
  - Density: 13.5/sq mi (5.21/km^{2})
- Time zone: UTC-6 (Central (CST))
  - Summer (DST): UTC-5 (CDT)
- Area code: 850
- GNIS feature ID: 294934

Spring Hill (also known as Springhill) is an unincorporated community and census-designated place in Santa Rosa County, Florida, United States. Its population was 169 at the 2020 census, up from 160 at the 2010 census. It is part of the Pensacola—Ferry Pass—Brent, Florida Metropolitan Statistical Area.

== Geography ==
According to the U.S. Census Bureau, the community has an area of 12.523 square miles (32.43 km^{2}); 12.521 square miles (32.43 km^{2}) of its area is land, and 0.002 square miles (0.0052 km^{2}) is water.

== Demographics ==
Spring Hill first appeared as a census designated place in the 2010 U.S. census.
