= Hillsdale, Oklahoma =

- Town
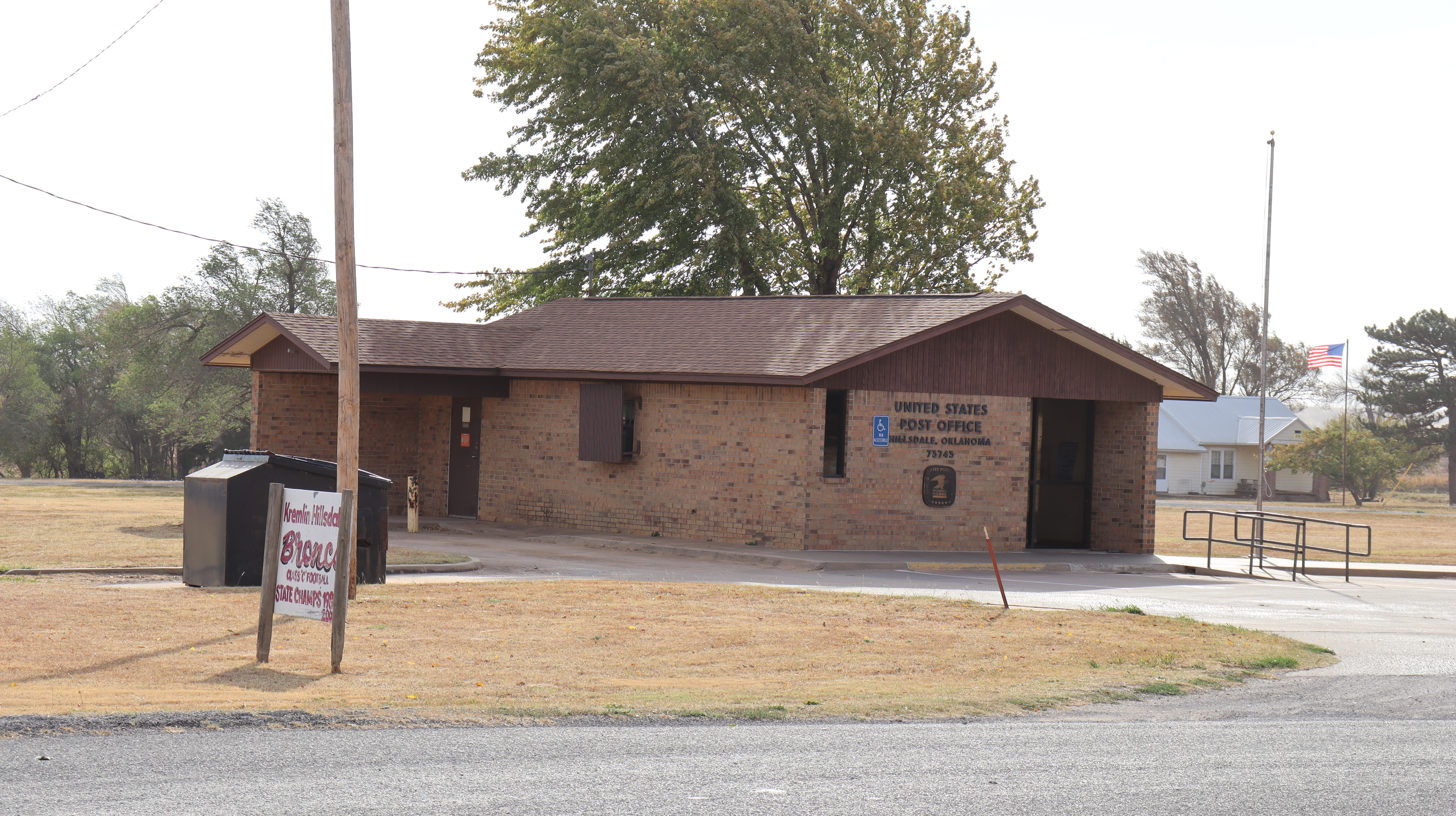
- Post Office in Hillsdale, Oklahoma

- Location in Garfield County and the state of Oklahoma
- Coordinates: 36°33′48″N 97°59′34″W
- Country: United States
- State: Oklahoma
- County: Garfield

Area
  - Total: 0.35 sq mi (0.90 km^{2})
  - Land: 0.35 sq mi (0.90 km^{2})
  - Water: 0 sq mi (0.00 km^{2})
- Elevation: 1,234 ft (376 m)

Population (2020)
  - Total: 75
  - Density: 216.4/sq mi (83.56/km^{2})
- Time zone: UTC-6 (Central (CST))
  - Summer (DST): UTC-5 (CDT)
- ZIP code: 73743
- Area code: 580
- FIPS code: 40-34650
- GNIS feature ID: 2412753

Hillsdale is a town in Garfield County, Oklahoma, United States. The population was 75 at the 2020 decennial census.

== Geography ==
Hillsdale is located in northwestern Garfield County and is 18 miles (29 km) northwest of Enid, the county seat.

According to the United States Census Bureau, the town has a total area of 0.3 square miles (0.9 km^{2}), all land.

== Demographics ==
Historical population
Census	Pop.	Note	%±
1910	226		—
1920	209		−7.5%
1930	173		−17.2%
1940	131		−24.3%
1950	104		−20.6%
1960	60		−42.3%
1970	77		28.3%
1980	110		42.9%
1990	96		−12.7%
2000	101		5.2%
2010	121		19.8%
2020	75		−38.0%

=== 2020 census ===
As of the 2020 census, Hillsdale had a population of 75. The median age was 48.4 years. 14.7% of residents were under the age of 18 and 18.7% of residents were 65 years of age or older. For every 100 females there were 134.4 males, and for every 100 females age 18 and over there were 146.2 males age 18 and over.

0.0% of residents lived in urban areas, while 100.0% lived in rural areas.

There were 38 households in Hillsdale, of which 36.8% had children under the age of 18 living in them. Of all households, 50.0% were married-couple households, 23.7% were households with a male householder and no spouse or partner present, and 21.1% were households with a female householder and no spouse or partner present. About 26.4% of all households were made up of individuals and 7.9% had someone living alone who was 65 years of age or older.

There were 40 housing units, of which 5.0% were vacant. The homeowner vacancy rate was 0.0% and the rental vacancy rate was 12.5%.

Racial composition as of the 2020 census
Race	Number	Percent
White	70	93.3%
Black or African American	0	0.0%
American Indian and Alaska Native	3	4.0%
Asian	0	0.0%
Native Hawaiian and Other Pacific Islander	0	0.0%
Some other race	0	0.0%
Two or more races	2	2.7%
Hispanic or Latino (of any race)	2	2.7%

=== Ancestry ===
The average family size was approximately 3.13, recorded during the 2021 American Community Survey. According to the survey, the town's ancestry data was composed of 40% German, 15% English, 9% Irish, and 1% Scottish ancestry.

=== Income ===
The median income for a household in the town was $58,750 (± $12,937) in 2021 inflation-adjusted dollars.

== Education ==
Hillsdale is within the Kremlin-Hillsdale Schools school district. The Hillsdale Christian School is a private school within the town which offers faith-guided education to pre-K through 12th grade students.
