= Edson, Kansas =

Unincorporated community in Sherman County, Kansas

- CDP
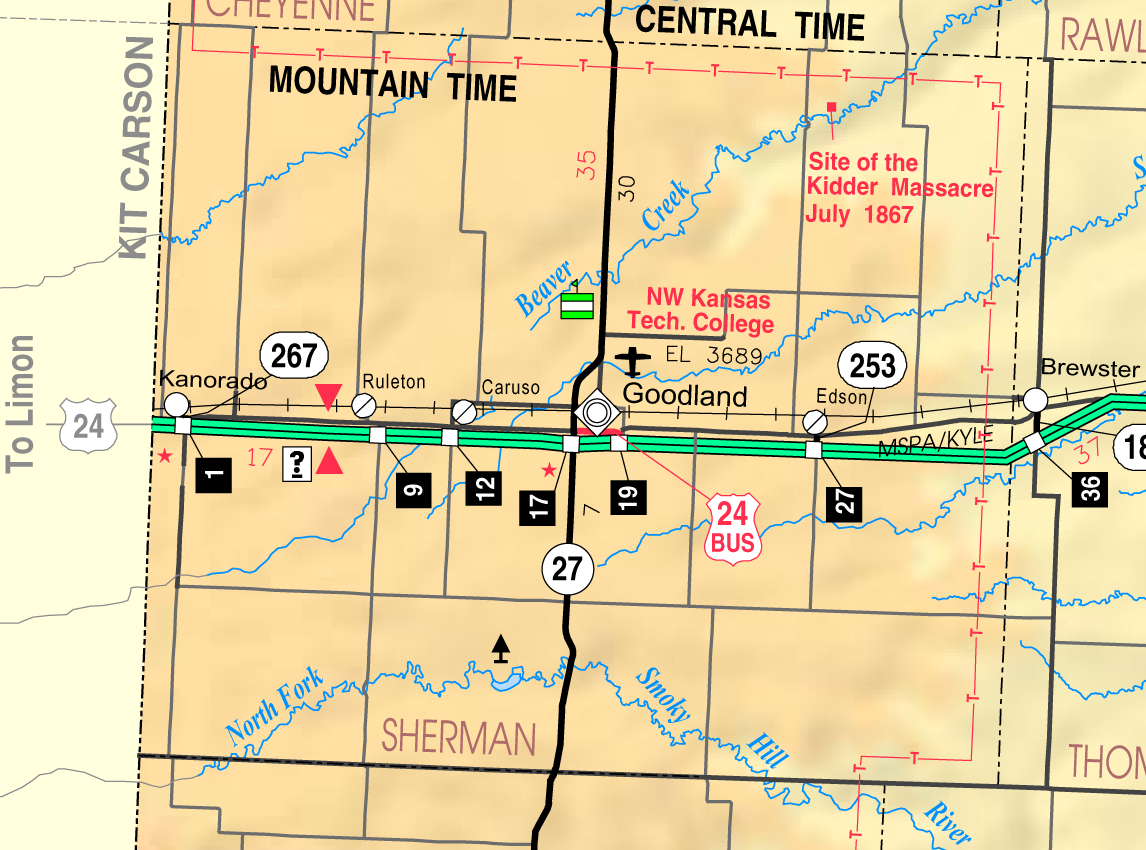
- KDOT map of Sherman County (legend)

- Location within Kansas Location within the United States
- Coordinates: 39°20′14″N 101°32′26″W
- Country: United States
- State: Kansas
- County: Sherman
- Named for: Ed Harris & Son
- Elevation: 3,566 ft (1,087 m)

Population (2020)
  - Total: 17
- Time zone: UTC-7 (Mountain (MST))
  - Summer (DST): UTC-6 (MDT)
- ZIP Code: 67733
- Area code: 785
- FIPS code: 20-19925
- GNIS ID: 471252

Edson is a census-designated place (CDP) in Sherman County, Kansas, United States. As of the 2020 census, the population was 17. Edson is located near Interstate 70, 9 miles (14 km) east of Goodland.

== History ==
Edson was named for settler Ed Harris, and his son. The first post office in Edson was established in 1888. The ZIP Code is 67733.

Edson was a station and shipping point on the Chicago, Rock Island and Pacific Railroad.

== Geography ==
=== Climate ===
According to the Köppen Climate Classification system, Edson has a semi-arid climate, abbreviated "BSk" on climate maps.

== Demographics ==
Historical population
Census	Pop.	Note	%±
2020	17		—
U.S. Decennial Census

The 2020 United States census counted 17 people, 12 households, and 5 families in Edson. The population density was 24.1 per square mile (9.3/km^{2}). There were 12 housing units at an average density of 17.0 per square mile (6.6/km^{2}). Everyone was white or European American (100% non-Hispanic white).

Of the 12 households, 1 had children under the age of 18; 5 were married couples living together; 2 had a female householder with no spouse or partner present. 7 households consisted of individuals and 4 had someone living alone who was 65 years of age or older. The average household size was 1.4 and the average family size was 1.7. It was estimated no-one in Edson had a bachelor's degree.

3 people were 25 to 44 years old, 8 were 45 to 64, and 6 were 65 or older. The median age was 57.8 years. There were 5 males and 12 females.

== Education ==
The community is served by Goodland USD 352 public school district.

Edson schools were closed through school unification. The Edson Rockets won the Kansas State High School boys class BB Track & Field championship in 1965.
