= Howell, Kansas =

Unincorporated community in Ford County, Kansas

- Unincorporated community
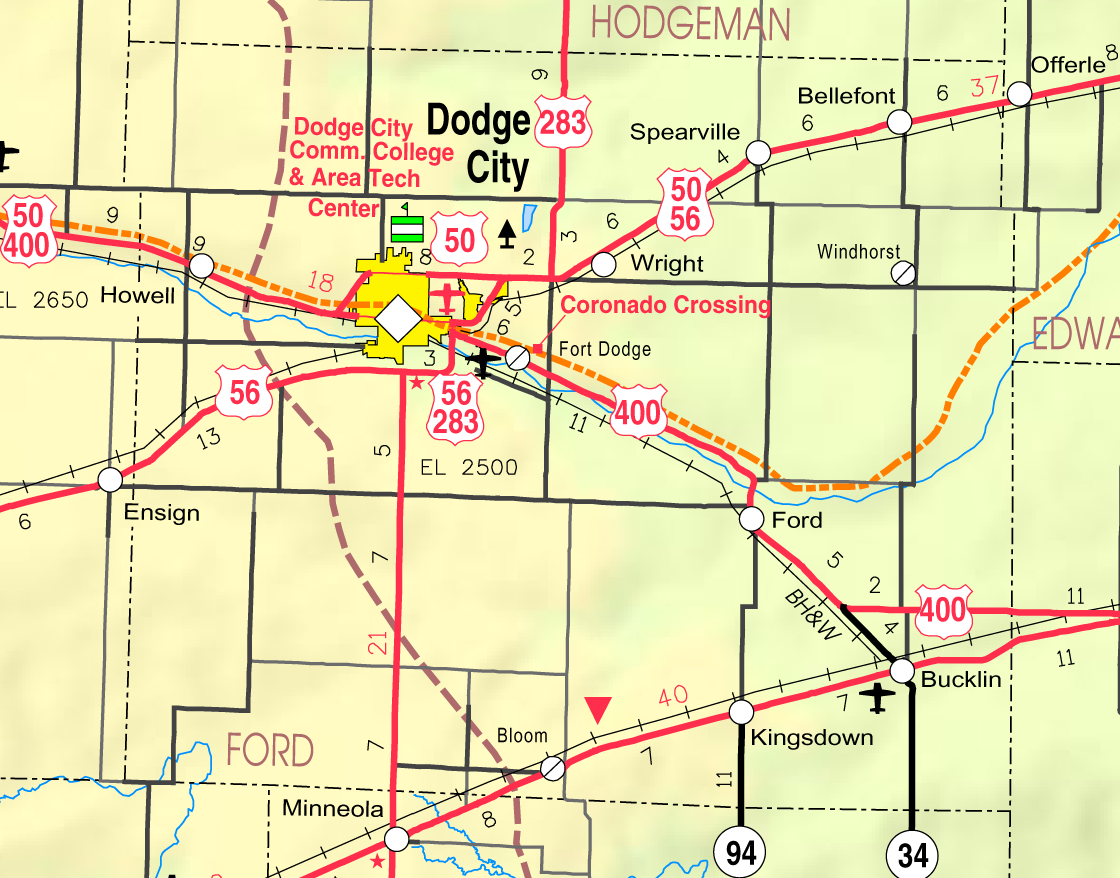
- KDOT map of Ford County (legend)

- Location within Kansas Location within the United States
- Coordinates: 37°47′0.08″N 100°10′45.5″W
- Country: United States
- State: Kansas
- County: Ford
- Elevation: 2,553 ft (778 m)
- Time zone: UTC-6 (CST)
  - Summer (DST): UTC-5 (CDT)
- Area code: 620
- FIPS code: 20-33325
- GNIS ID: 471658

Howell is an unincorporated community in Ford County, Kansas, United States. It is located along Highway 50 at 102 Rd.

== Education ==
The community is served by Dodge City USD 443 public school district.
