= Brandon, Nebraska =

Unincorporated community in Nebraska, United States

- Unincorporated Community
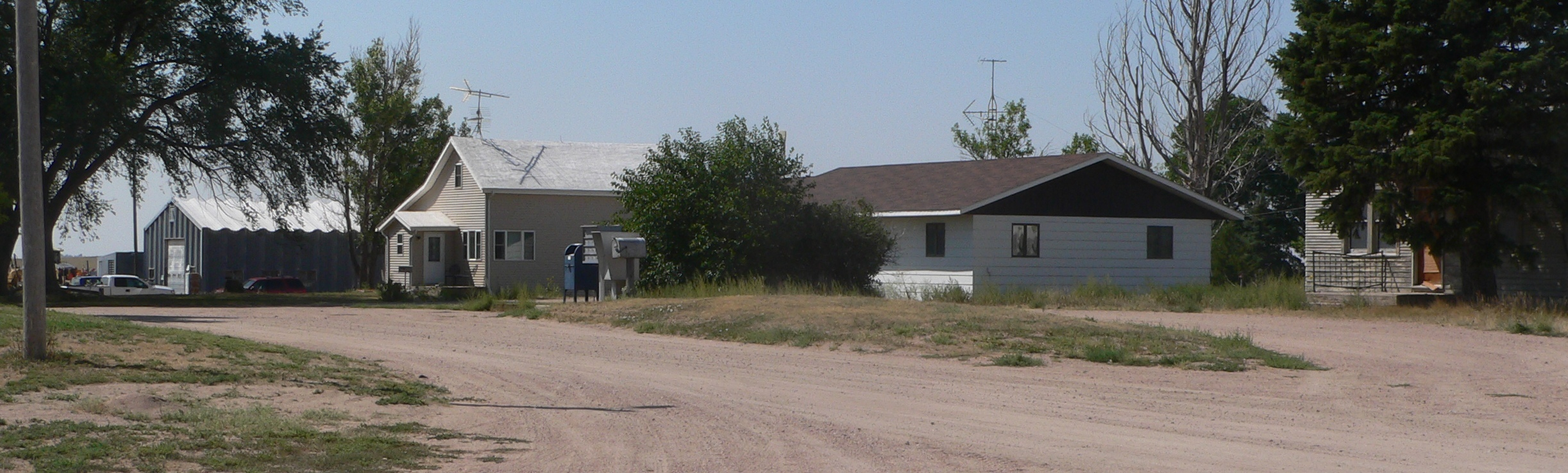
- Downtown Brandon

- Location within Nebraska Location within the United States
- Coordinates: 40.8°N 101.9°W
- Country: United States
- State: Nebraska
- County: Perkins

Brandon is an unincorporated community in Perkins County, Nebraska, United States.

== History ==
Brandon got its start when the Burlington Railroad was extended to that point. A post office called Brandon was established in 1890. The origin of the name Brandon is unclear. It might be either the name of a railroad official, or named after a place in Ohio.

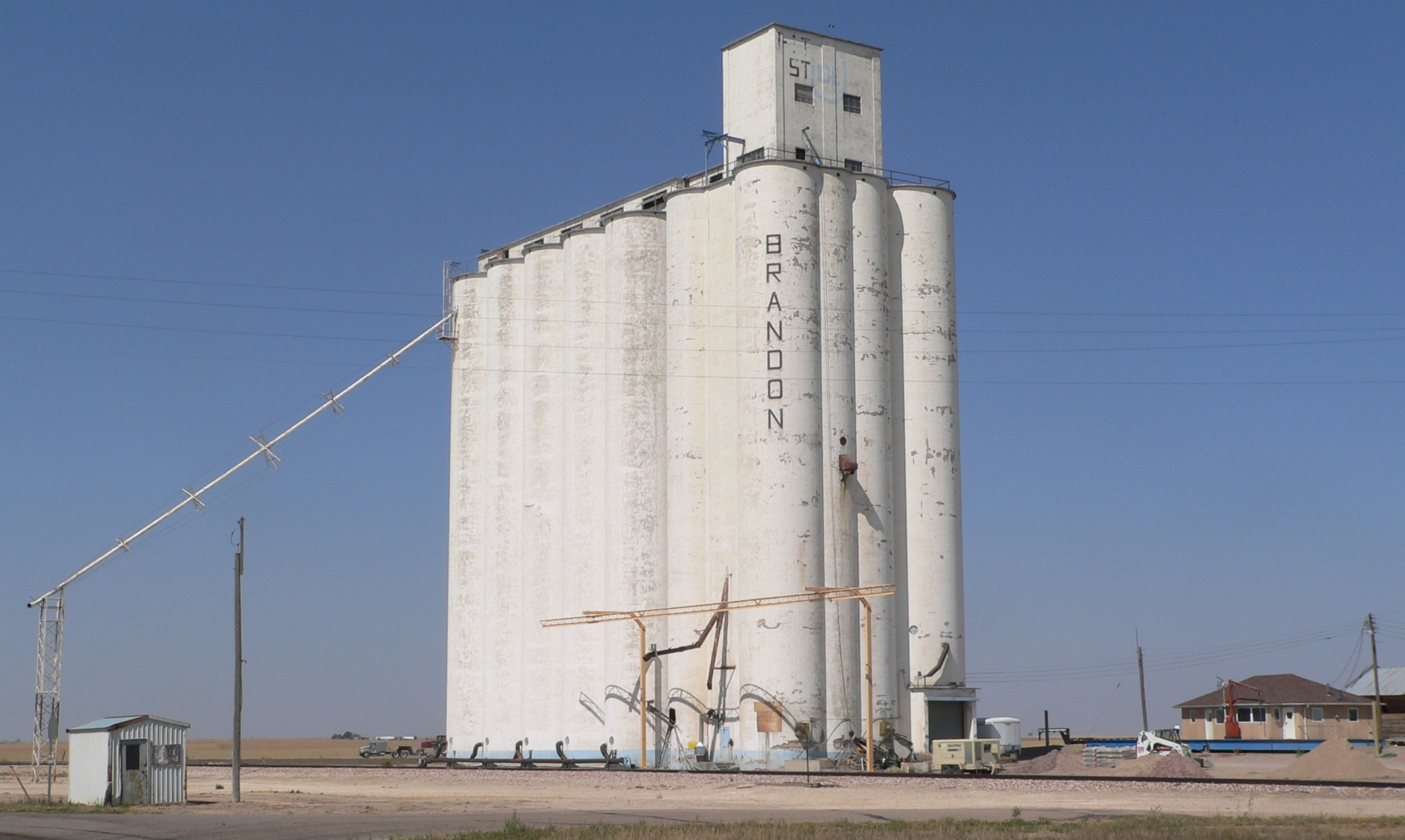
Brandon, Nebraska grain elevator 1
