= Ashby, Nebraska =

Unincorporated community in Grant County, Nebraska, United States

- Unincorporated Community
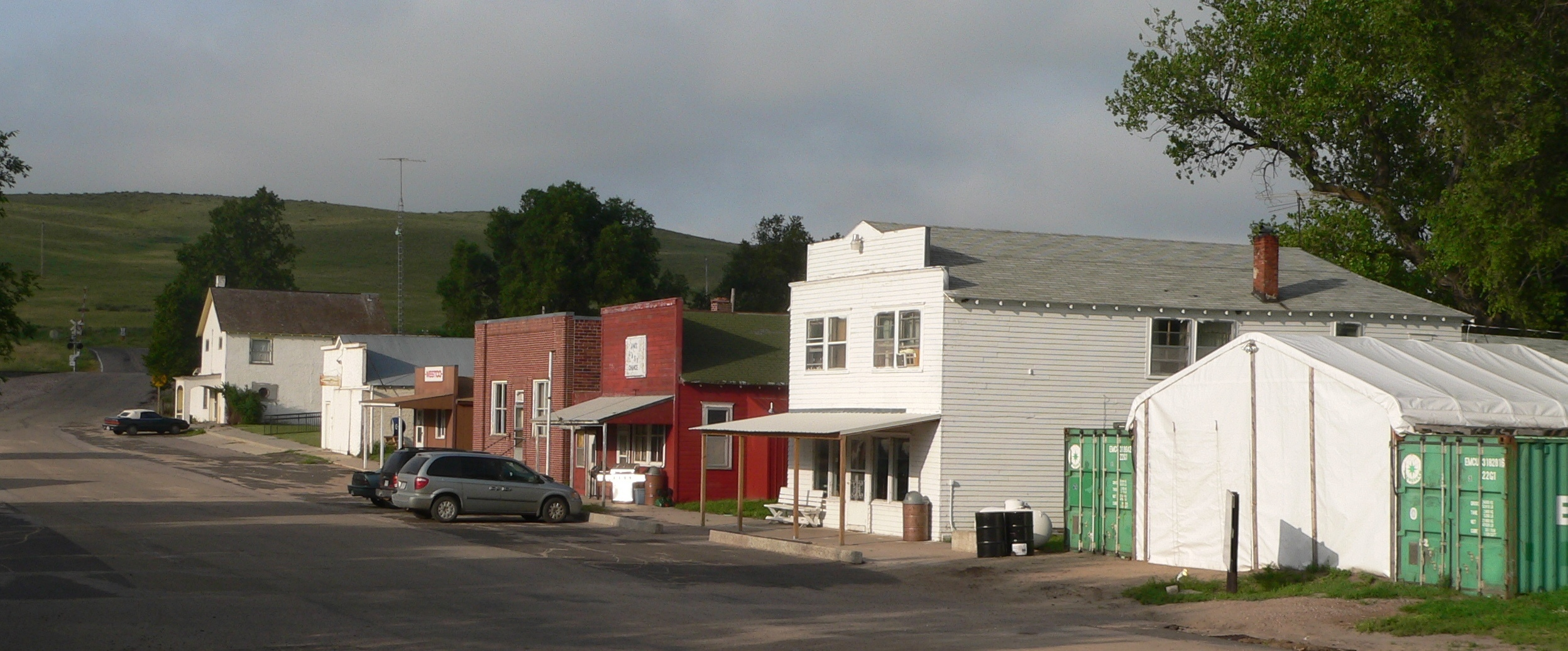
- Downtown Ashby

- Location within Nebraska Location within the United States
- Coordinates: 42.0219°N 101.928°W
- Country: United States
- State: Nebraska
- County: Grant

Ashby is an unincorporated community in Grant County, Nebraska, United States. Its elevation is 3,843 feet (1,173 m), and it is located at 42°1′19″N 101°55′40″W (42.0219276, -101.9276811). It lies along Nebraska Highway 2, 9 miles (14½ km) west-northwest of Hyannis, the county seat of Grant County. It has a post office with the ZIP code 69333.

== History ==
Ashby got its start following construction of the railroad through the territory. It was named after the town of Ashby, Massachusetts by a railroad official.

The Ashby post office was established in 1908.
