= Lamar, Nebraska =

- Village
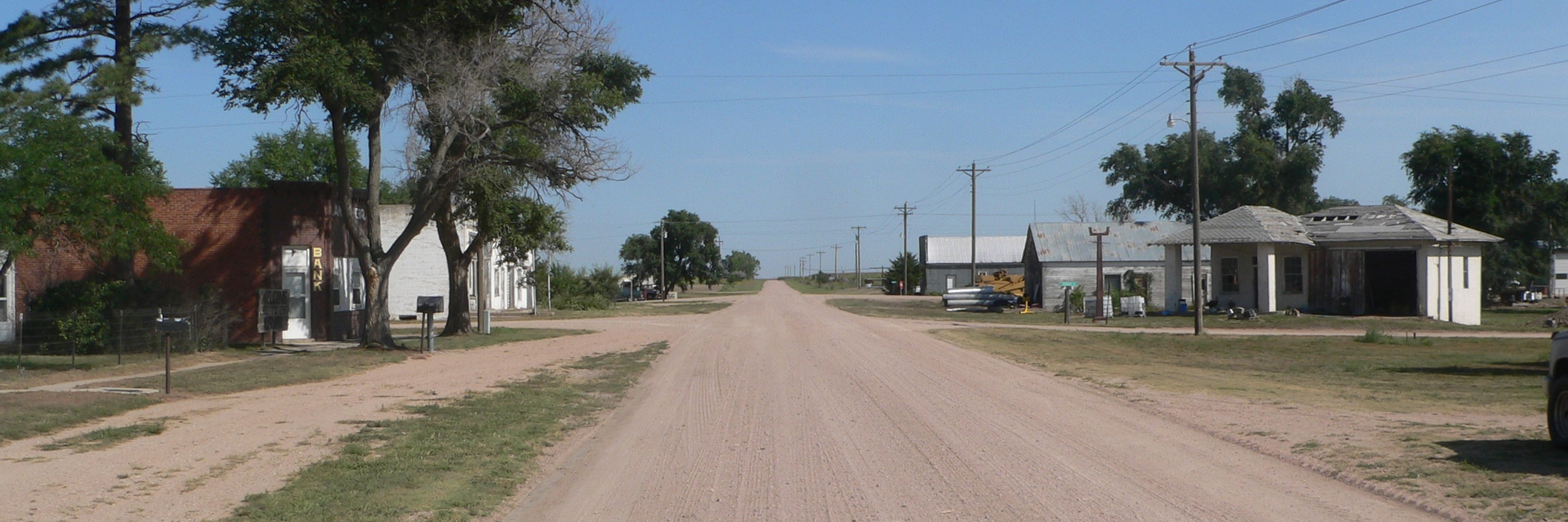
- Downtown Lamar: Pawnee Street

- Location of Lamar, Nebraska
- Coordinates: 40°34′21″N 101°58′45″W
- Country: United States
- State: Nebraska
- County: Chase

Area
  - Total: 0.077 sq mi (0.20 km^{2})
  - Land: 0.077 sq mi (0.20 km^{2})
  - Water: 0 sq mi (0.00 km^{2})
- Elevation: 3,517 ft (1,072 m)

Population (2020)
  - Total: 28
  - Density: 356/sq mi (137.4/km^{2})
- Time zone: UTC-7 (Mountain (MST))
  - Summer (DST): UTC-6 (MDT)
- ZIP code: 69023
- Area code: 308
- FIPS code: 31-26175
- GNIS feature ID: 2398392

Lamar was a village in Chase County, Nebraska, United States. As of the 2020 census, Lamar had a population of 28. On November 5, 2024, the Village of Lamar voted to unincorporate.

== History ==
Lamar was laid out at its current site in 1887 when the Chicago, Burlington and Quincy Railroad was extended to that point. It was named for Lucius Quintus Cincinnatus Lamar II, a former Confederate soldier and diplomat who wrote the Mississippi Ordinance of Secession and who served as United States Secretary of the Interior in the Grover Cleveland administration.

A post office was established at Lamar in 1887, and remained in operation until it was discontinued in 1995.

== Geography ==
According to the United States Census Bureau, the village had a total area of 0.07 square miles (0.18 km^{2}), all land.

== Demographics ==
Historical population
Census	Pop.	Note	%±
1930	122		—
1940	120		−1.6%
1950	81		−32.5%
1960	50		−38.3%
1970	30		−40.0%
1980	60		100.0%
1990	31		−48.3%
2000	19		−38.7%
2010	23		21.1%
2020	28		21.7%
U.S. Decennial Census

=== 2010 census ===
As of the census of 2010, there were 23 people, 11 households, and 4 families residing in the village. The population density was 328.6 inhabitants per square mile (126.9/km^{2}). There were 12 housing units at an average density of 171.4 per square mile (66.2/km^{2}). The racial makeup of the village was 100.0% White.

There were 11 households, of which 18.2% had children under the age of 18 living with them, 36.4% were married couples living together, and 63.6% were non-families. 36.4% of all households were made up of individuals, and 27.3% had someone living alone who was 65 years of age or older. The average household size was 2.09 and the average family size was 3.25.

The median age in the village was 54.5 years. 17.4% of residents were under the age of 18; 0.0% were between the ages of 18 and 24; 21.7% were from 25 to 44; 30.4% were from 45 to 64; and 30.4% were 65 years of age or older. The gender makeup of the village was 47.8% male and 52.2% female.

=== 2000 census ===
As of the census of 2000, there were 19 people, 10 households, and 6 families residing in the village. The population density was 248.3 inhabitants per square mile (95.9/km^{2}). There were 12 housing units at an average density of 156.8 per square mile (60.5/km^{2}). The racial makeup of the village was 100.00% White. Hispanic or Latino of any race were 10.53% of the population.

There were 10 households, out of which 30.0% had children under the age of 18 living with them, 40.0% were married couples living together, 10.0% had a female householder with no husband present, and 40.0% were non-families. 40.0% of all households were made up of individuals, and 30.0% had someone living alone who was 65 years of age or older. The average household size was 1.90 and the average family size was 2.50.

In the village, the population was spread out, with 15.8% under the age of 18, 5.3% from 18 to 24, 10.5% from 25 to 44, 42.1% from 45 to 64, and 26.3% who were 65 years of age or older. The median age was 50 years. For every 100 females, there were 137.5 males. For every 100 females age 18 and over, there were 100.0 males.

As of 2000 the median income for a household in the village was $23,750, and the median income for a family was $28,750. Males had a median income of $25,625 versus $33,750 for females. The per capita income for the village was $14,463. There were no families and 12.5% of the population living below the poverty line, including no under eighteens and 50.0% of those over 64.
