= Samuel May Williams =

Influential Texas patriot and businessman

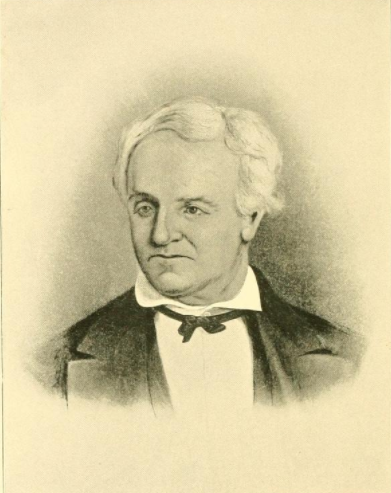
- Samuel May Williams

Member of the Texas diplomatic mission to Mexico
- In office September 1843 – April 1844

Member of the Lower House, Republic of Texas, Galveston County District
- In office 1839–1840

Diputado of the Coahuila and Texas state legislature, Republic of Mexico, Brazos District
- In office 1835–1835

Secretary of the San Felipe de Austin Ayuntamiento
- In office 1828–1832

Personal details
- Born: October 4, 1795 Providence, Rhode Island
- Died: September 13, 1858 (aged 62) Galveston, Texas
- Citizenship: American, Mexican, Texan
- Party: Sam Houston faction (Republic of Texas)
- Spouse: Sarah Patterson Scott
- Children: 9
- Relatives: Henry Howell Williams (brother)
- Occupation: Secretary, businessman, politician

Samuel May Williams (October 4, 1795 – September 13, 1858) was an American businessman, politician, and close associate of Stephen F. Austin, who was an Anglo-American colonizer of Mexican Texas. As a teenager, Williams started working in the family's mercantile business in Baltimore. He spent time in South America and New Orleans, fleeing the latter because of debts. He landed in Mexican Texas in 1822, having learned French and Spanish. Stephen F. Austin hired Williams for his colony in 1824. Williams first worked as a clerk, and later assumed the title of secretary to the ayuntamiento, a local government established for the colony by the Mexican state of Coahuila and Texas. He worked for Austin for about a decade.

In 1834, Williams quit as secretary of the Austin Colony to work as a merchant, then formalized a partnership with Thomas F. McKinney. The next year he also made deals with the provincial government in Monclova for a bank charter and for large tracts of land in Texas. At that time he was a representative in the Coahuila and Texas legislature. However, by 1836, Williams and his partner, Thomas F. McKinney, supported the Texas Revolution against Mexico. Williams borrowed money against his family's lines of credit, which the partners applied to ships and ammunition on behalf of the rebel government.

After Texas gained independence, Williams focused most of his business activities in Galveston, and represented Galveston County for one term in the Republic of Texas legislature. Through his partnership with McKinney he was invested in the Galveston City Company, and established diverse business interests there. The partnership ended when their business was acquired by Henry Howell Williams in 1842.

After 1842, Williams worked toward establishing a bank in Texas. He briefly returned to public service when he accepted a diplomatic mission to negotiate a treaty with Mexico, which had still not recognized the sovereignty of the Republic of Texas. In the first year of Texas statehood, he ran twice for the U.S. House of Representatives, losing both times. In 1848 Williams succeeded in introducing the first bank in Texas: the Commercial & Agricultural Bank (C & A Bank). This was the only institution to legally issue paper money, though his charter and the bank's practices faced legal challenges throughout its existence, including anti-banking legislation and scrutiny from various Texas Attorneys General. Favorable decisions rendered by the district courts saved Williams and his bank for about four years. C & A Bank remained solvent during the Panic of 1857, but anti-banking politics were on the rise. Many of Williams' friends and allies distanced themselves from the bank and encouraged him to give up the project, but he resisted their advice. He died in 1858 after a short illness.

== Early life ==
Samuel May Williams was born October 4, 1795, in Providence, Rhode Island, to Howell and Dorothy (Wheat) Williams. His ancestors arrived in New England in the 1630s, and his family tree included a signer of the Declaration of Independence and a president of Yale University. Williams had four brothers and three sisters. His immediate family consisted of sailors and merchants; Howell Williams was a ship captain, and Samuel's uncle, Nathaniel Felton Williams, was a commission merchant in Baltimore. After some schooling in his native city, Samuel apprenticed to Nathaniel. A younger brother, also named Nathaniel Felton Williams, succeeded him as their uncle Nathaniel's apprentice.

The Williams family conducted a robust trade with Argentina, shipping food in exchange for cash or hides. Williams left Baltimore to oversee freight bound for Buenos Aires, where he stayed to conduct further business in South America. There Williams learned the Spanish and French languages, and his business dealings gave him experience in navigating Spanish business and political customs. In 1818, Williams boarded at a hotel in Washington, D. C. (where pirate and New Orleans denizen Jean Lafitte had been a resident), and the next year, Williams was living and working in New Orleans. Historians disagree about the timing of Williams's return to the United States from South America. While Joe B. Frantz and Ruth G. Nichols estimate his arrival to New Orleans as the year 1815, Margaret Swett Henson disputes this as a possibility, though she is less certain about timeline.

== Career ==
=== Gone to Texas ===
The Panic of 1819 in the United States forced many Americans into insolvency. By 1822, the opening of Mexican Texas to Anglo-colonization offered these distressed families an opportunity to escape debts by moving outside the jurisdiction of American law. Sometimes these debtors abandoned their property and wrote the letters "GTT" on their doors, an acronym for Gone to Texas. Though Williams sold tobacco to the Karankawa people on Galveston Island in 1821, he joined the ranks of the immigrant debtors in May 1822. He and a female companion left New Orleans and the United States to escape debts and poor economic prospects. They registered under the names of Mr. and Mrs. E. Eccleston, and passed over the gangplanks of the sloop Good Intent. The sailing ship met a storm in the Gulf of Mexico, and finally made landfall at the mouth of the Colorado River on June 18.

At this time Texas was a part of Mexico. Moses Austin had negotiated a contract to colonize part of Texas, but his death in 1821 put the deal in limbo. As Williams first arrived in Texas, Stephen F. Austin, the son of Moses Austin, traveled to Mexico City in order to reinstate the contract and facilitate implementation of the Austin Colony. During Austin's visit, word reached Mexico City of a Mr. Eccleston, who was literate in English, Spanish, and French. By late 1823, Austin had returned to Texas and met Eccleston, who had established a local reputation by clerking and teaching school. Austin hired him in November. This is around the time that Williams reverted to his birth name. For a time both Williams and Austin had lived and worked in the same area of New Orleans, but there is no direct evidence that they had known each other prior to their meeting in 1823.

=== Stephen F. Austin Colony ===
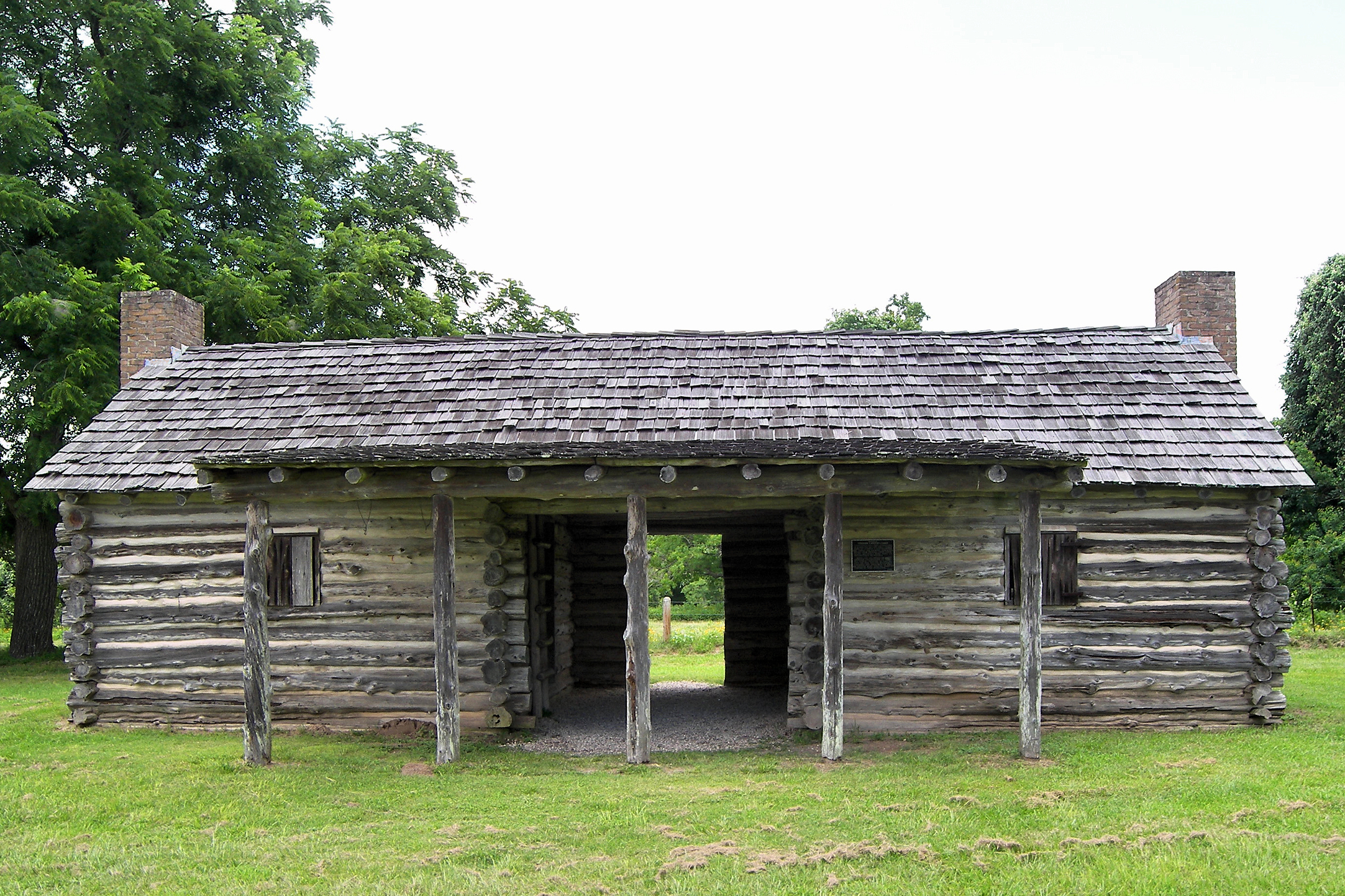
Replica log cabin at San Felipe de Austin Historic Site

Williams was with Austin when the new empresario selected a location for his colonial headquarters, San Felipe de Austin. Austin first hired Williams as a translator and clerk, whose language skills, both in English and Spanish, were necessary to fulfill his responsibilities. Another critical skill was his handwriting. In an era when all documents were written by hand, the ability to write legibly was critical to properly reading them later. Williams' knowledge of Mexican culture and Spanish business practices were also assets. In the fall of 1824, Austin appointed Williams as a recording secretary for the Austin Colony. Though Mexico had not yet established an ayuntamiento (local government) in the colony, Austin had told Jose Antonio Saucedo about his intention to establish the recording secretary position with all of the responsibilities of a secretary for an ayuntamiento. Also in 1824, Williams received his own headright, which included two leagues (about 4,428 acres each) and three labores (about 640 acres each). Austin had promised Williams an annual salary of $1,000, ($24,434 in 2019) but the colony was not generating much revenue.

Williams continued to accept additional responsibilities at the Austin Colony. He managed the Public Land Office, and he served as its postmaster from 1826. He served as secretary of the ayuntamiento from 1828 to 1832, a post requiring him to record official documents in Spanish and send them to the state government. Austin later claimed that Williams had been underpaid for his service and later compensated him with 49,000 acres (200 km^{2}) of land in Texas. With his existing land grant of 9,387 acres (37.99 km^{2}), Williams had accumulated more than 58,000 acres (230 km^{2}) of land in Texas.

=== After the Austin Colony ===
Early in 1834 Williams co-founded the partnership of McKinney and Williams, setting up a warehouse at Brazoria, then relocated to Quintana at the mouth of the Brazos River. The firm operated small steamboats on the Brazos and used its warehouse to manage transfer of freight to and from the larger ships operating on the Gulf of Mexico.

An internal political battle in Mexico caused the state of Coahuila and Texas to split into two capitals. Those loyal to Santa Anna (santanistas) controlled the original capital, Saltillo, while the rival federalistas established their capital at Monclova. During meetings at the state capital, Williams bought 100 leagues of land in northeast Texas from the Monclova government at an eighty percent discount. During the trip he also secured a bank charter, while selling $85,000 (~$2.72 million in 2024) worth of its stock. However, back in Anglo-Texas, the Consultation nullified the land deal when it declared all large land grants voided in November 1835.

In 1835, Williams was elected as a delegate to the Coahuila and Texas Legislature, representing the district of Brazos. That legislature offered for sale 3.5 million acres of land in the Mexican state, an action which many Texians (ethnic Anglos living in Mexican Texas) perceived as corrupt. His participation in the Monclova government aroused the resentment of such persons, many of whom were already suspicious of Williams because of his former position of power in granting land in the Austin Colony. From the perspective of Williams, a member of the federalist Monclova government, the massive land sale was a justified state action in defense of the Mexican Constitution of 1824, which was challenged by Santa Anna and the Saltillo government. The Monclova government was raising money to prepare for a possible civil war in Coahuila.

=== Texas independence ===
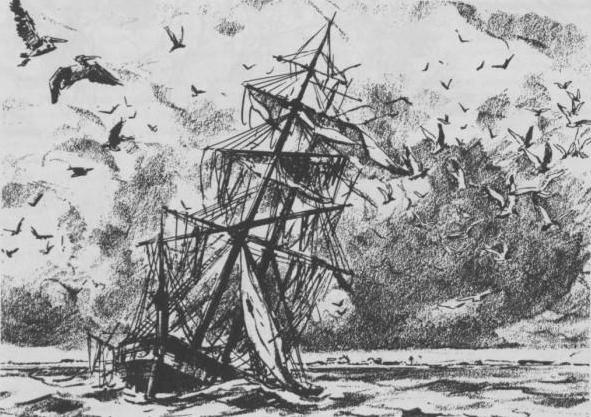
Invincible depicted as wrecked in 1837

With santanista General Martín Perfecto de Cos marching from Saltillo, the Monclova legislature ended its session in late-May 1835 with most of its members fleeing the region. Many of the federalists were captured, including Williams who was taken after crossing the Rio Grande River at Presidio, Texas. He was incarcerated at San Antonio, but escaped on horseback in a plot engineered by his friend, José Antonio Navarro. Williams arrived in San Felipe de Austin as an enemy of Santa Anna and Cos. At the same time, his actions in Monclova made him unpopular with Anglos in Texas.

Williams went on a tour of the eastern United States in order to raise capital for his bank. Williams was selling stock in New York when he read about a possible war in Texas. He pivoted toward Texas independence while relying on financial assistance from his brother, Henry Howell Williams. He borrowed against his brother's credit to obtain the 125-ton schooner Invincible in support of a Texian naval force. In May 1836, Williams returned with ammunition and supplies loaded on his schooner, along with as many as 700 volunteers on three other boats. Mostly as a result of procurements Williams made in the United States in 1835, the McKinney and Williams partnership had contracted $99,000 (~$2.96 million in 2024) in short-term debt on behalf of the Republic of Texas. The new government was not able to repay the debt. These loans to the Texas cause had been leveraged by letters of credit from Henry Howell Williams. Thus the Republic of Texas mounted substantial debt from the account of the McKinney and Williams partnership, which in turn had at least of portion of its financial backing from Henry Howell Williams. After independence, Williams served the Republic of Texas as its loan commissioner while serving simultaneously as a procurement officer for the Texas Navy, serving both the Sam Houston and Mirabeau Lamar administrations.

=== Galveston ===
==== Mercantile business ====
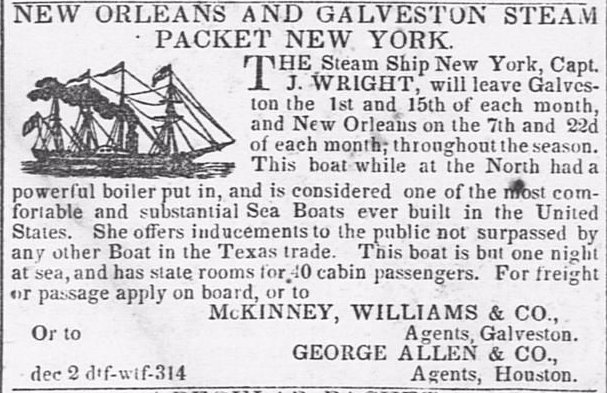
Advertisement for the steamer New York (via Portal to Texas History)

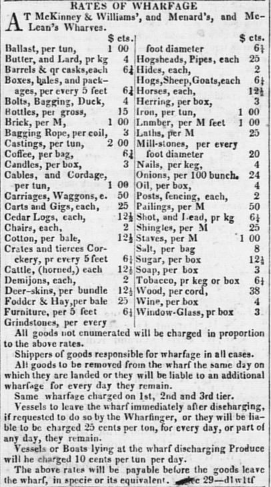
Rates at the Galveston Wharf, 1843 (via Portal to Texas History)

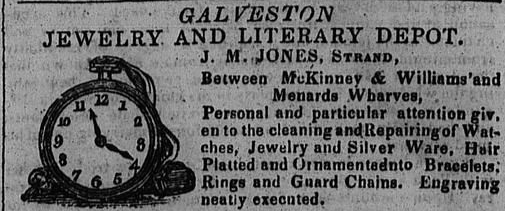
An 1844 advertisement jeweler near McKinney and Williams (via Portal to Texas History)

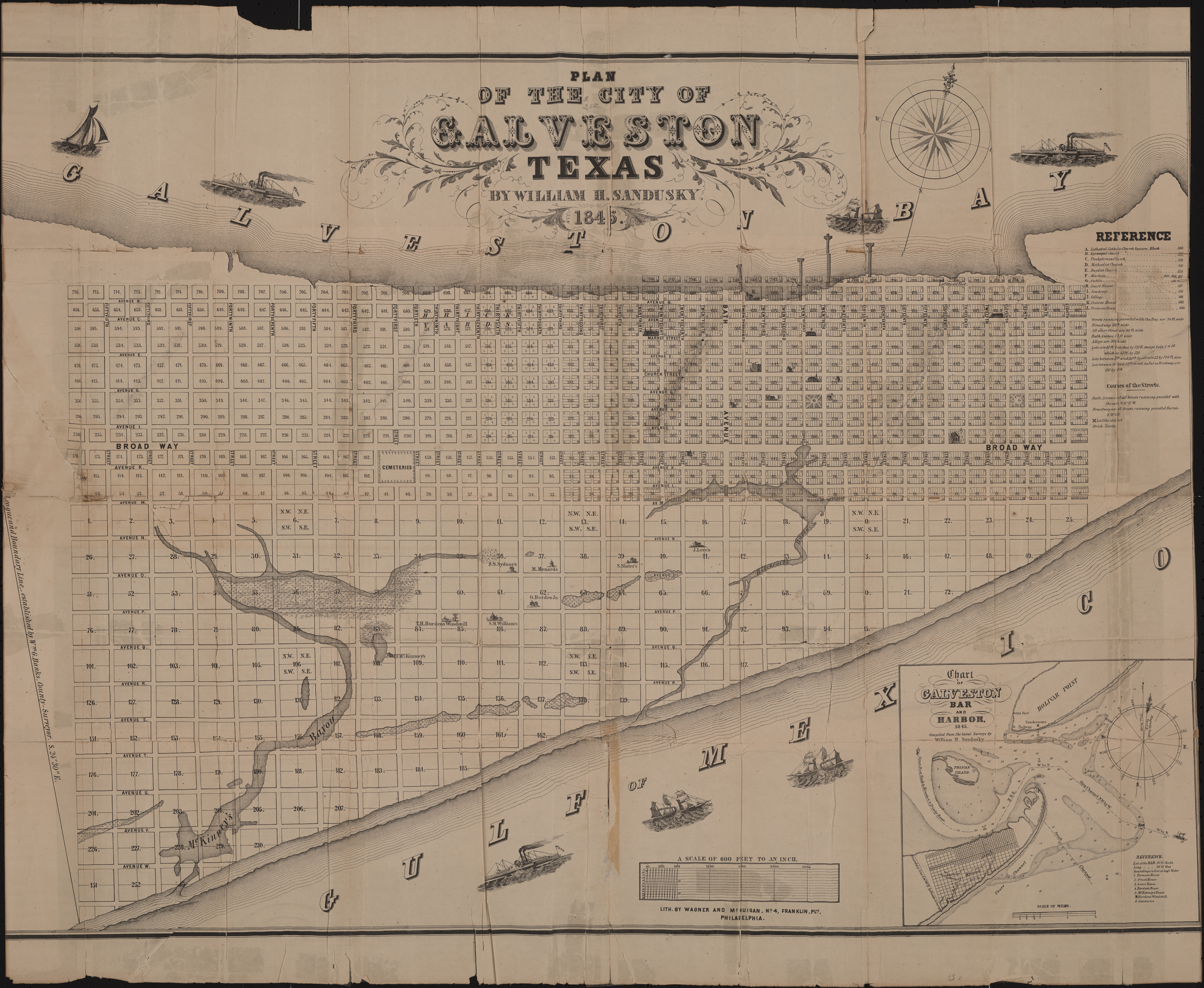
Map of Galveston, circa 1845

McKinney and Williams were investors and co-founders of the Galveston City Company with Michel B. Menard. Menard hatched the development scheme in 1833, coordinating to acquire a Mexican title to bayside land at the east end of Galveston Island from Juan Seguin. The next year Galveston City Company purchased from Seguin a league and a labor, or about 4,605 acres. The McKinney and Williams investment was initially a fifty-percent share. In December 1836, the Republic of Texas announced it would validate this title in exchange for $50,000 (~$1.49 million in 2024) in cash or merchandise. While there is no evidence of any payment to the Texas government, this action transferred land on the east end of the island to the Galveston City Company. Both Williams and McKinney joined the company's board of directors, and voted with the board to make lots available for sale on April 20, 1838.

McKinney and Williams relocated its headquarters from Quintana to Galveston in 1838. The main business of the firm was its mercantile operations, which specialized in buying Texas cotton for trade in the United States and England. The firm advanced sales to planters on credit, drawing from the lines of credit from the large mercantile house of Henry Howell Williams in Baltimore. McKinney and Williams competed most aggressively for market share of the Texas cotton crop in 1838 and 1839. In addition, the firm also operated a diverse set of businesses on Galveston Island: they owned a race track, operated a tavern and stables, and offered houses for let, and they owned the Tremont hotel, for which Henry Howell Williams was the managing partner. The Tremont continued operating in Galveston through 1865. Their principal developments were their three-story warehouse and the wharf at Twenty-fourth Street. In 1839, McKinney and Williams received goods from Liverpool, England, and loaded the same ship with Texas cotton, establishing direct trade between England and the Republic of Texas. McKinney and Williams divested their commission business in 1842, selling it to Henry Howell Williams, who ran it as a division of his commission house in Baltimore.

In 1839, Williams represented Galveston County in the lower house of the Congress of the Republic of Texas. McKinney and Williams used their commission house to support the Williams campaign. They offered to buy Texas Treasury notes (redbacks) for 50 cents on the dollar just as rival commission houses offered only 37.5 cents on the dollar. Substantively, he campaigned based on a conservative monetary policy in response to the Republic's devaluing currency.

Williams once used his position in the House to assert the interests of the Galveston City Company, challenging the election of John M. Allen, the town's first mayor. He led the passage of a bill to change Galveston's charter, which imposed a requirement of land ownership in order to vote in municipal elections. Effectively this reduced the number of eligible voters by half, and this paved the way for the "conservatives" to elect John W. Walton over the "liberal" John M. Allen in 1840. Allen transported the town's archives and stored them in his home, which was guarded by two artillery pieces. McKinney recruited a group of men to recapture the archives, and Allen surrendered them without incident.

Williams chaired the finance committee for the lower house, and served as a member of the naval affairs committee. Williams allied with Sam Houston's faction against President Mirabeau Lamar's spending proposals and his Indian policy. He issued a finance report and proposal on January 12, 1840, which included two Hamiltonian recommendations: the recall of older debt instruments and stopping further issuance of unsecured debt. In addition, he proposed that Texas only accept payments in cash from importers and suggested a broad fifteen percent tariff on imported goods. This proposal was a political success, as all of its recommendations were adopted. However, inflation continued into 1841, as Texas redbacks traded at 37.5 cents on the dollar before he went to Austin and later depreciated to 12.5 cents. He sponsored a successful bill which established a state charter for the city of Galveston and another to build a local lighthouse. Williams promoted a bill to emancipate Cary McKinney, a slave of his business partner. Cary was just one of two enslaved persons emancipated in recognition of service to the Republic of Texas. Though Cary's family was not emancipated, he was able to reunite his family by purchased his family members himself.

President Sam Houston selected Williams for a diplomatic mission to Mexico. As late as 1843, Mexico did not recognize the sovereignty of Texas, while Santa Anna offered a general amnesty and other concessions to Texas provided it agreed to re-incorporate itself into Mexico. Houston agreed to a cease fire and peace talks. He appointed Williams and George W. Hockley as envoys, charging them with entertaining a proposal which was unpopular in Texas. The two envoys accepted their official orders in September 1843, but they lacked the authority to stand behind their own agreements, which would be subject to approval by the President and the Texas Congress. According to the Secretary of State, Anson Jones, their job was to extend the process as long as possible. Meanwhile, unknown to Williams and Hockley, Texas negotiated an annexation treaty with the United States and appealed for sovereign recognition from Great Britain. The Texas War Department, on the other hand, instructed them to demand demilitarization of the Nueces Strip, the corridor in south Texas between the Rio Grande and Nueces rivers. Diplomatically, Mexico claimed all of Texas as its sovereign territory; militarily, Mexico fortified at the Nueces River. Withdrawing from the Nueces Strip was an untenable position for Mexico, though Jones had told them that Mexico would agree to it. Williams and Hockley sailed for Laredo in early October, but the venue changed to Sabinas while they were in transit. After arriving, an illness postponed the meetings, so negotiations did not start until December. Their counterparts, Cayetano Montero and Alexander Ybara, did not consent to the Texans' proposal that Mexico withdraw troops beyond the Rio Grande River.

Williams acquired a sugar plantation in 1844. This 1,100 acre parcel was located near the coast and west of Quintana, at the San Bernard River. Joseph and Austin Williams, two of his sons, managed the plantation for a brief period before its sale in 1850.

Williams ran for US Congress twice. A special election in 1846 was necessary to determine representation for Texas for the few months remaining of the Twenty-ninth Congress. Williams was one of six candidates for the Texas Second district while running on a platform of national assumption of Texas's debt. Texans would benefit from the passage of such legislation; however, Williams and his former business partner had not been repaid by the Republic of Texas for its war debt. He finished second to Timothy Pillsbury. He challenged Pillsbury for the seat in November and lost by a wider margin; it was the last time he ran for public office.

==== Commercial and Agricultural Bank ====
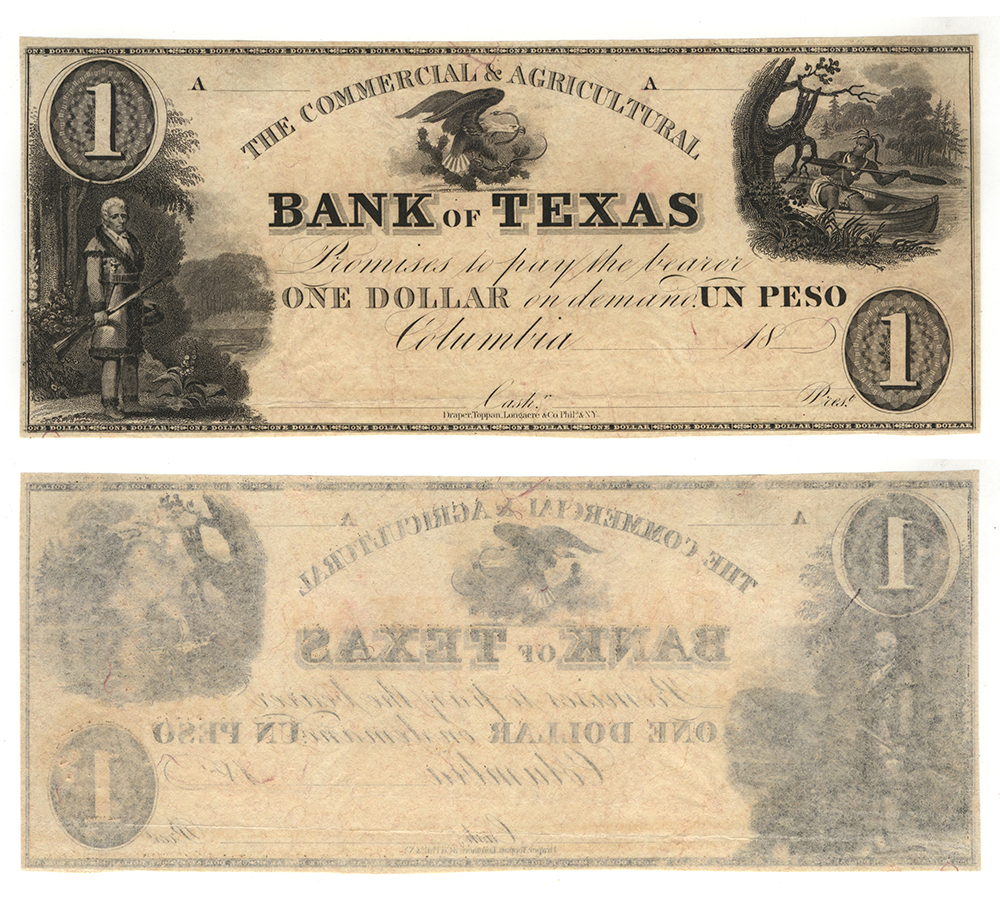
$1.00 (one dollar) private scrip issued by Commercial and Agricultural Bank of Texas

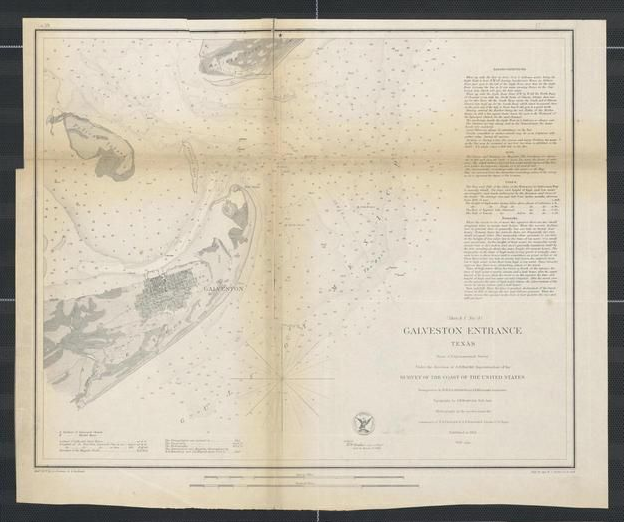
Map of 1853 showing eastern entrance to Galveston Bay and the east end of Galveston Island (via Portal to Texas History

Williams was president of the first incorporated bank to operate in Texas. The Commercial and Agricultural Bank opened in Galveston on December 30, 1847, and later established a branch in Brownsville, as well as agencies in New Orleans, New York City, and Akron, Ohio. Williams continued as the bank's president until his death. Williams exploited his latent 1835 Mexican bank charter and an old resolution from the Republic of Texas. He had permission to open a bank during the Texas Republic, but did not use this privilege. The Texas bank inspector, Niles F. Smith, never had an opportunity to execute his duties in 1837, but he was never officially relieved of his appointed post. Williams recalled inspector Smith in 1847, who certified the bank's assets in Galveston, New Orleans, and New York. Williams operated out of a building at the corner of Market and Tremont streets.

Three months later the Texas Legislature proscribed the distribution of paper money, creating a civil fine of $5,000 per offense. Despite this law, $30,000 of the Commercial & Agricultural bank notes had been circulating in New Orleans that year, with another $18,000 distributed in Texas. Meanwhile, Williams maintained a large cache of specie to cover redemptions of his notes. Two members of the Texas Congress headed an opposition to the C & A Bank: Guy M. Bryan and Elisha M. Pease. Attorney General and Pease-ally John W. Harris filed a lawsuit against Williams, who retained Galveston-attorney, Ebenezer C. Allen. Harris filed a total of four suits against Williams with $75,000 in fines. In 1849, a District Court ruled that an 1841 law that gave Williams banking privileges was still valid.

In 1849, Williams gained an ally in the state congress. His former partner in the mercantile trade, Thomas McKinney gained a seat in the lower house and sought to repeal the 1848 banking laws. McKinney also found common cause with Williams in relation to the incoming Attorney General, Andrew Jackson Hamilton. For McKinney it was personal, and for Williams it was business. Hamilton had prosecuted the case against Williams in district court and was then the official in charge of enforcing the 1848 banking act. McKinney took over as chairman of a special investigations committee, which determined that Hamilton had failed to report "widespread corruption". After the legislature passed a reform bill to change the office of Attorney General into an elected one, McKinney campaigned for the election of Ebenezer C. Allen, Williams's lawyer.

Liquidity in Galveston conferred an advantage for local business interests to finance large infrastructure projects. The C & A Bank financed the Galveston and Brazos Navigation Company, chartered in 1850. The company cut a channel through the shallow, sandy bottoms, from the coast at the west end of Galveston Island to the mouth of the Brazos River.

In March 1852, the Texas Supreme Court ruled on the state's appeal in the Williams case. The prosecution strategy was based on challenging the legality of the charter, but the court affirmed the 1835 charter and the 1841 relief law. In response to the decision, Bryan and Hamilton devised a new strategy, emphasizing the illegality of paper money issuance, and fining anyone who issued or circulated paper money. By the end of the year, a new attorney general, Thomas J. Jennings sued officers of the C & A Bank, though it was dismissed by District Judge Peter W. Gray. Jennings continued to file similar suits against two Galveston financiers into the next year, while Gray continued to dismiss them.

Early in 1857, District Judge Gray fined Robert G. Mills $100,000 after a jury found him guilty of violating the 1848 banking act. The jury in the Williams trial was deadlocked, but his legal team recommended that he consent to a fine of $2,000 with a guilty plea. A few weeks later, Gray lost his election bid for the Texas Supreme Court to Oran M. Roberts, with the court seating an anti-banking, pro-agrarian judge. The political climate did not favor Williams and his banking interests in 1857, but an economic panic was a greater threat. A bank closed for business in New York that August, and by October, three banks in New Orleans stopped paying in specie. This triggered a mass of demands for redemptions at both Galveston banks, which prompted Williams to refuse to honor some depositors' checks. An early closing triggered a sharp discount on his bank notes, but local fears were allayed after local merchants honored the Williams notes at par, and Williams reversed his policy, resuming payments in specie. Williams survived the Panic of 1857. However, political and legal prospects for his bank did not improve. Williams persisted in the banking business despite the legal challenges, and he resisted the advice of family and friends to divest of C & A Bank.

== Personal life ==
=== Family life ===
In 1822, Williams and a female companion arrived in Texas under the assumed names of Mr. and Mrs. E. Eccleston. He left unresolved debt in New Orleans, but there may have been other reasons for his departure. The couple lived together in San Felipe de Austin, but there is no indication of their marital status or even her name. They had a son together named Joseph Guadalupe Victoria Williams, who was born in San Felipe de Austin in 1825. The next year Williams split up with her, and she left the colony, taking their son with her. After her death, Williams brought Joseph back to Texas and raised him as a member of his family.

Williams married Sarah Patterson Scott on March 4, 1828, at San Felipe de Austin. A native of Kentucky, she emigrated to Texas with her parents William and Mary Scott in 1824. Sarah Williams gave birth to nine children, five of whom survived to adulthood. By 1829, Samuel and Sarah Williams were caring for two children: their newborn daughter Sophia Caroline Williams and his four-year-old son "Vic" from the previous relationship. By 1830, Williams had already moved his family from Calle Commercio to a lot on the outskirts of town, and added onto this wood-framed house, then finished it with locally milled siding and brick, and with imported sash from New Orleans. In addition to his annual salary of $1,000, (~$30,234 in 2025) he received a seven-league bonus in 1830 for service to the ayuntamiento. He selected seven leagues scattered throughout the colony.

After escaping from jail in June 1835, Williams moved his family from the seat of the Austin Colony to Quintana. While Samuel was in the United States, Sarah fled her home during the Runaway Scrape early in 1836. By that time, the Williams's had already relocated from San Felipe de Austin to Quintana, the site of the McKinney and Williams warehouse, where the McKinneys also lived. Thomas McKinney and William H. Jack transported a small contingent of people from Quintana over the Gulf to McKinney's warehouse at the mouth of the Neches River.

For the four years ending in the summer of 1839, business travels on behalf of his own interests and in support of the Texas cause kept him occupied in the United States. He only resided with his family for eight months during this period.

=== Freemasonry ===
The Independent Royal Arch Lodge No. 2, Free & Accepted Masons initiated Williams in New York City on November 21, 1835. Williams received the first three degrees of Freemasonry that same night. Four days later, on November 25, 1835, he received all the degrees of the Royal Arch chapter in Jerusalem Chapter No. 8, Royal Arch Masons. Six days later, on December 1, 1835, he received the orders of Masonic Knighthood in Morton Commandery No. 4, Knights Templar. A week after that, on December 8, 1835, the General Grand Chapter of Royal Arch Masons, meeting in Washington, D.C., granted Williams a charter for a chapter of Royal Arch Masons to be known as San Felipe de Austin Chapter No. 1, it being the first Royal Arch chapter in Texas, and he was installed as its first presiding officer.

As a Freemason, Williams became a member of a fraternity that included a number of other early Texas patriots like Stephen F. Austin, Sam Houston, Jose Antonio Navarro and Lorenzo de Zavala. Williams "was the moving spirit" behind the formation of the first Masonic lodge in Galveston, and is considered "the father" of Galveston's Harmony Lodge No. 6. Williams represented Harmony Lodge at the annual Grand Lodge meeting in December 1839. At that meeting, he was elected the third Grand Master of Masons in Texas, succeeding Anson Jones and Branch T. Archer. An avid proponent of Royal Arch Freemasonry, Williams was instrumental in the formation of the Grand Chapter of Texas, Royal Arch Masons, and, on December 30, 1850, he was elected its first presiding officer.

=== Samuel May Williams House ===
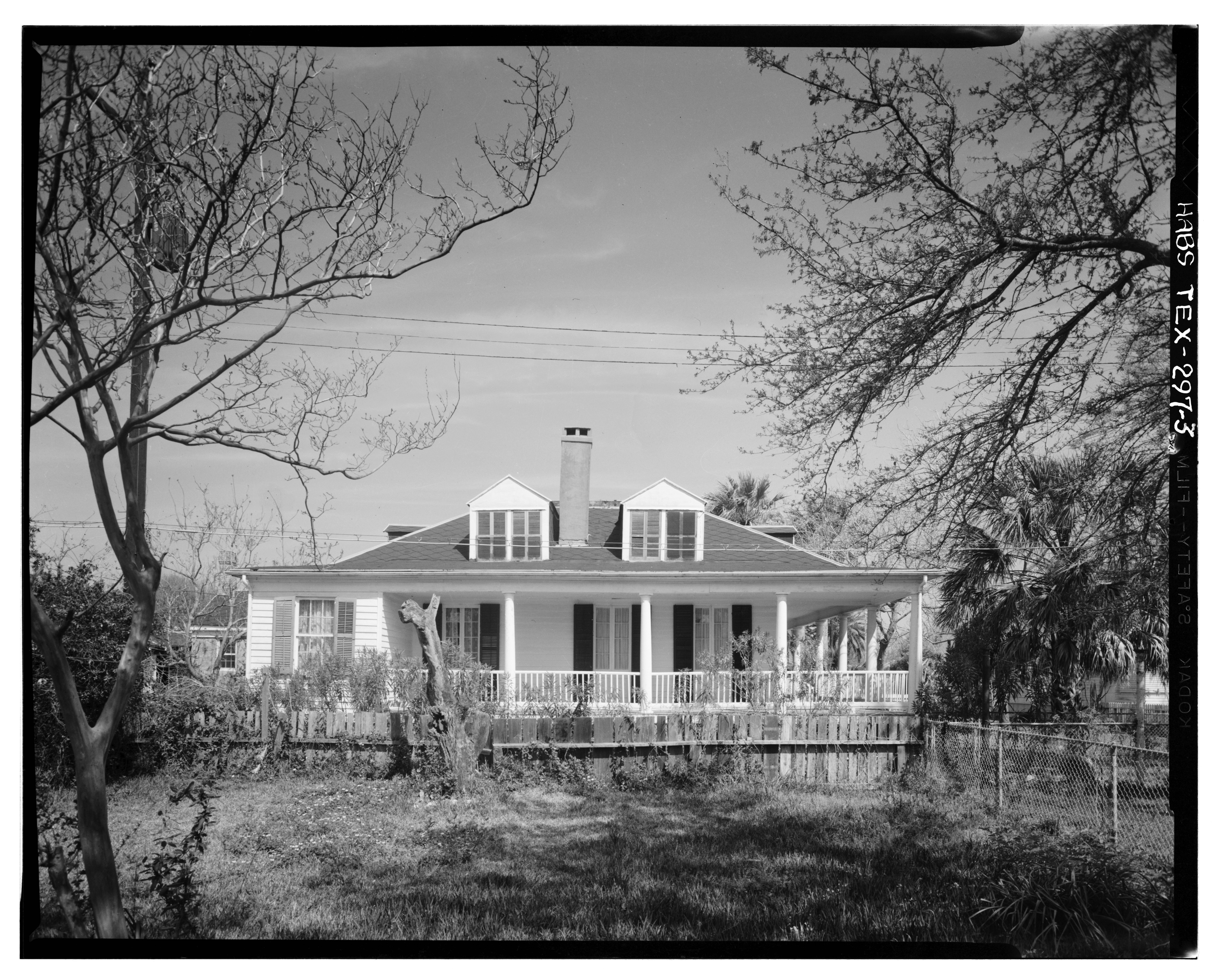
Southern view of Samuel May Williams House

Thomas McKinney managed the construction of Williams's house and his own on a large nearby suburban lots outside of Galveston, a project he started in 1839. The family took residency sometime in 1840. The large tract included a pasture, a vegetable garden, and several outbuildings. They kept henhouse and a cowpen for their own consumption of eggs and other dairy, as well as stables and a carriage house. The Williams' owned slaves, perhaps all from the same family, who worked in the house and other parts of the property. Allegedly a cook attempted to poison the family in 1842; however, there is no record to indicate any punishment, legal or otherwise.

This suburban area near the Williams house was home to several local merchants during the 1840s. In addition to the McKinney house, his neighbors included Michel Menard, John Sydnor, and two of the Borden brothers. Menard was a co-founder of Galveston with McKinney and Williams, and engaged as a merchant with J. Temple Doswell. Sydnor was a commission merchant, and is known to have auctioned enslaved persons, though there is a question about whether this was a regular part of his business. Thomas and Gail Borden Jr. co-published the Telegraph and Texas Register before moving to Galveston. Thomas surveyed land in the Austin Colony before the Texas Revolution. Gail, during part of his stay in Galveston, was a collector of customs, but he is best known for inventing a process for condensed milk. Despite the population growth of Galveston through 1850, this neighborhood ceded its popularity among the wealthy to the Broadway corridor in the next decade.

== Death and legacy ==
Williams died on September 13, 1858, after an illness of about two weeks. Local Knights Templar and Royal Arch Freemasons led his funeral proceedings. Many flags were flown that day at half mast, while many Galveston businesses closed to honor his memory. He left four surviving children and his wife. He and his wife are buried at the Trinity Episcopal Cemetery in Galveston. The original grave sites cannot be identified, but the State of Texas installed a cenotaph in their memory. Since he had not recorded a will, he left a contested estate which included large tracts of undeveloped land in addition to other assets valued at $95,000. His Galveston home, the Samuel May Williams House, is on the National Register of Historic Places.

Early in 1859, the Texas State Supreme Court invalidated the bank charter of 1835 used to support the C & A Bank. The ruling had three consequences for the bank: it made the bank responsible for paying a large fine imposed by the lower court, it lost the ability to issue notes, and all notes outstanding were to be redeemed and destroyed. This effectively killed the bank, though Williams did not live quite long enough to witness its ending. Biographer Margaret Swett Henson writes, "The ten-year court battle with its political overtones had eroded his once robust health, and despairing of vindication, he relinquished the struggle and allowed despondency to triumph." Journalist Gary Cartwright claims that Williams "died a bitter and frustrated old man, emotionally, physically, and financially drained."

Williams, through his business partnership with McKinney, supported the war for independence with cash, and with goods and services in-kind, including ships, mercenaries, and ammunition. Williams died in 1858, without seeing any repayment by the Republic or by the State of Texas. McKinney continued to assert the claims of the partnership, but died in 1873 before succeeding in this advocacy. Upon his death, the state acknowledged $17,000, a small portion of the claim, but did not remit any funds to his estate. The State of Texas finally acknowledged the legacy of the Williams and McKinney contributions through a repayment in 1835.

Texas historian Joe Frantz characterizes the partnership of McKinney and Williams as "Underwriters of the Texas Revolution," since, "without their aid [Sam] Houston's army conceivably would have lacked clothes, provisions, and most especially, arms." Yet Cartwright notes a lack of acknowledgement of the legacy of Williams in his adopted hometown: "Today hardly anyone in Galveston remembers his name or what he did. The city of Galveston is tireless, almost shameless, in its devotion to its heroes, but there is no street, no park, no school or building or monument that bears the name Samuel May Williams." He also cites examples of actions by Williams which were corrupt, or at least, perceived to be corrupt by dint of their association with what many Texans considered to be unsavory business and political dealings. Williams was labelled a "Monclova speculator" by some of his Texian contemporaries, a reference to his advantageous land acquisitions from the rebelling anti-Santanista faction in Coahuila. After Texas independence, the Republic brokered a deal acknowledging a legacy land grant from the Monclova government and conveying it to the Galveston Town Company, which included Williams as one of its business partners. Cartwright alleges that Williams was conscious of his own standing in Galveston when he ran for the Congress of the Texas Republic in 1839. Leading up to the election, McKinney and Williams offered favorable exchange rates for Texas treasury notes compared to their local business rivals, which Cartwright suggests was a successful attempt to buy votes.

== Bibliography ==
- Barker, Eugene C. (1926). The Life of Stephen F. Austin: Founder of Texas, 1793–1836. 1969 reprint. Austin: University of Texas.
- Cartwright, Gary (1991). Galveston: A History of the Island. New York: Macmillan Publishing Company.
- Duncan, William J. (1904). History of Independent Royal Arch Lodge No. 2, F. & A.M., of the State of New York. New York: Grand Lodge of New York, F. & A.M.
- Frantz, Joe B. (1952). "The Mercantile House of McKinney & Williams, Underwriters of the Texas Revolution". Bulletin of the Business Historical Society. 26 (1): 1–18. doi:10.2307/3111339. JSTOR 3111339.
- Henson, Margaret Swett (1976). Samuel May Williams: Early Texas Entrepreneur. College Station, TX: Texas A & M University Press. ISBN 9780890960097 – via archive.org.
- Henson, Margaret Swett (1992). The Samuel May Williams Home. Austin: Texas State Historical Association.
- Henson, Margaret Swett (June 15, 2010). "WILLIAMS, SAMUEL MAY". Texas Handbook Online. Texas State Historical Association.
- Lightfoot, Jewel P. (August 25, 1943). "History of Relations Between the Grand Chapter of Texas and the General Grand Chapter of the United States of America" (PDF). Grand Royal Arch Chapter of Texas. Archived from the original (PDF) on March 7, 2019.
- Maca, Kathleen Shanahan (2015). Galveston's Broadway Cemeteries. Images of America. Charleston, SC: Arcadia Publishing.
- McComb, David G. (1986). "The New York of Texas". Galveston: A History. Austin: University of Texas Press. pp. 42–83.
- Nichols, Ruth G. (1952). "Samuel May Williams". The Southwestern Historical Quarterly. 56 (2): 189–210. JSTOR 30235125.
- Petitfils, Chas. K. (1997). "History of Harmony Lodge No. 6, A.F. & A.M." Harmony Lodge No. 6, A.F. & A.M.
- Ruthven, A.S. (1857). Proceedings of the Grand Lodge of Texas, 1837–1857, in Two Volumes. Galveston: Richardson & Co.
- Torget, Andrew (2015). Seeds of Empire: Cotton, Slavery, and the Transformation of the Texas Borderlands, 1800–1850. Chapel Hill: University of North Carolina Press. ISBN 978-1-4696-4556-8.
