= Ashworth family =

Free African-American family prominent in the early history of Texas

Ashworth
- Current region: Texas (Orange County, Jefferson County) Louisiana (Calcasieu Parish)
- Origin: Province of South Carolina
- Founder: James Ashworth
- Connected families: Dial family

The Ashworth family is a free African-American ranching family that achieved economic success in Texas during the 19th century.

They were part of a larger network of families, often referred to by whites as Redbones or Melungeons. They participated in the 1856 Orange County War on the side of the Regulators, and some left to Louisiana afterwards.

Scholar Jason A. Gillmer notes the Ashworths offer a method to examine the subject of free Black people in Texas, which he states is underdeveloped due to a lack of documentation on the subject compared to in Virginia and the Carolinas. Some of their descendants now document the history of the family through media.

== History ==
=== South Carolina (1700s – 1810) ===
The Ashworth family previously lived in the backcountry of South Carolinia during the 1760s. Author Tim Hashaw states they raised cattle along the Peedee River, using innovations developed by African cattle herders in Virginia during the 17th century. The cattleman James Ashworth fought in the South Carolina militia during the 1759 campaign against the Cherokee.

The Ashworth family lived in Pendleton District, South Carolina before large numbers of white settlers had arrived, when it was part of the South Carolina frontier. They were stock raisers, and grazed their cattle on peavine forests in the area. The family lived with the Dial, Sweat, Perkins, and Goins families, who shared a similar background.

=== Migration to Louisiana (1810) ===
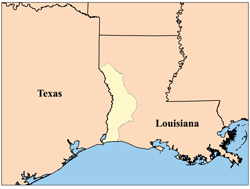
The Neutral Ground (1806–1821)

In 1810, James Ashworth and his family migrated from Pendleton District to the Neutral Ground, between the Calcasieu and Sabine rivers in Louisiana. His wife was Keziah Dial, of the Dial family originating in 17th century Virginia. Their sons were William, Aaron, Abner, and Moses. They initially lived in simple log cabins, before the area was reorganized into historic St. Landry's Parish, and then split off into Calcasieu Parish.

The Ashworth, Dial, Perkins, and Bunch families settled together in Louisiana. They founded a Baptist church, as the previous settlers in the area had been Catholics. Locals began referring to them as Redbones. By 1820 these families tended to intermarry. Some white families also lived among them, intermarrying with them at times as well.

=== Migration to Mexican Texas (1831 – 1835) ===
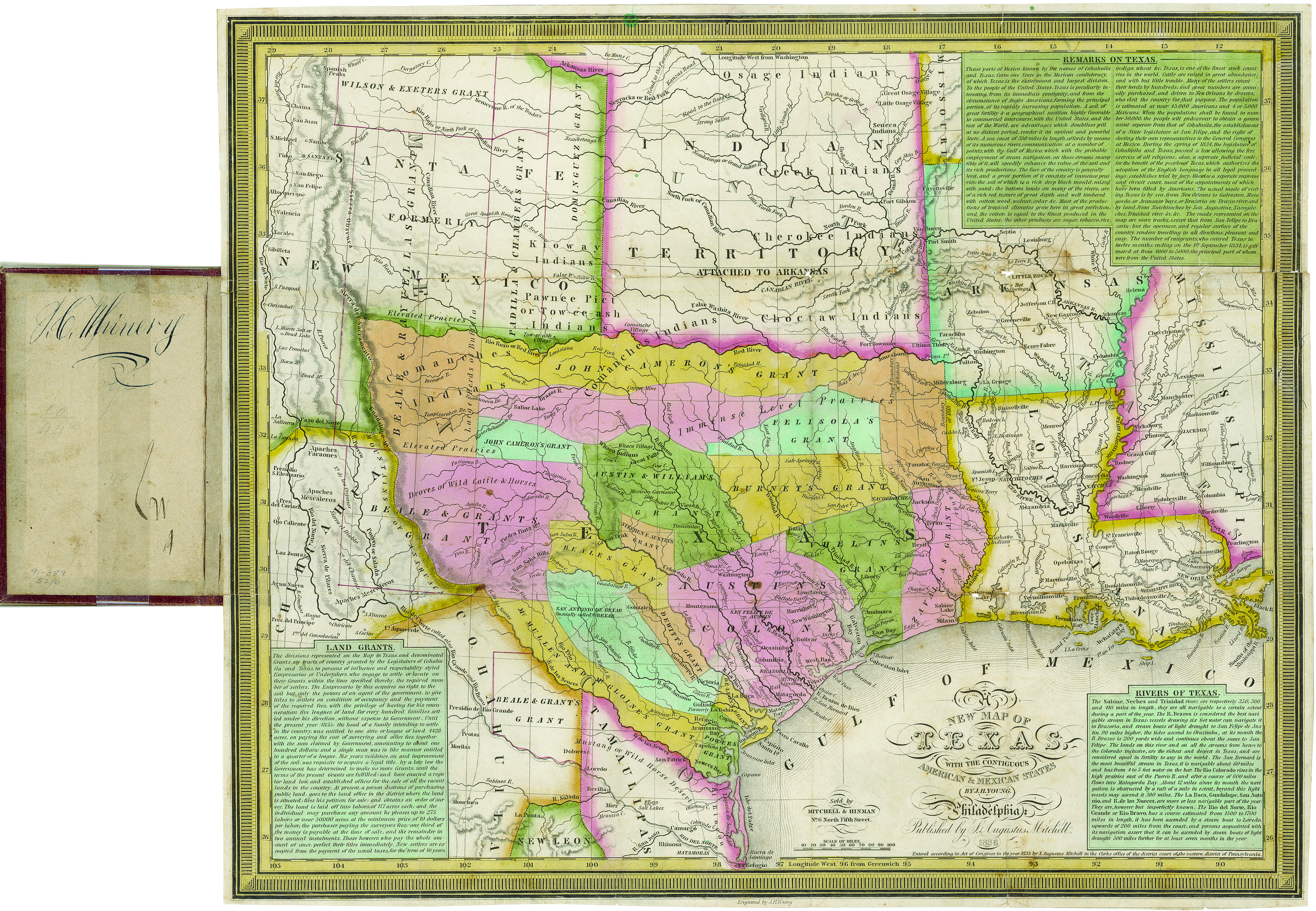
Lorenzo de Zavala's land grant in Texas.
Calcasieu Parish, Louisiana (1835).
Sabine Lake and the Neches River are visible on the southeast portion of the grant.

The Ashworth family drove their cattle to Southeast Texas in the early 1830s, from Calcasieu Parish, Louisiana. Scholar Terry G. Jordan-Bychkov refers to them as the first cattle ranchers in Texas not of Mexican descent. James Ashworth's sons William and Aaron migrated to Mexican Texas first in 1831. They settled on land previously owned by Lorenzo de Zavala, by the lower Neches near modern-day Orange. William and his wife Delaide did not initially have legal permission to immigrate, and likely lived in a crude dogtrot house. They were followed by Abner and Moses Ashworth. William began operating a ferry across the Sabine Lake and up the Neches River to Beaumont.

In 1834, Mexico lifted its immigration ban, and the Ashworths began applying for land patents. There were 150 free African-Americans in Mexican Texas including the Ashworths, and they enjoyed full legal rights under Mexican law. Three members of the family received orders of survey from the Mexican government, but were unable to receive land title and locate the land before the Texas Revolution of 1835–1836.

William Ashworth served for three months in the Texas Revolution, during the fall of 1835. He fought under James Bowie in the "Grass Fight" against Mexican cavalry near San Antonio, and was honorably discharged. William and Aaron later paid others to fight for them in the revolution. (Note: William paid one of his kin, Gibson Perkins, to fight for him. He was related to the Melungeon Gibson family, as well as the Perkins family of Tennessee and Louisiana.) One member of the family died at Goliad. Colonel William Gray and others fleeing the Mexican Army attempted to use the Ashworth ferry during the Runaway Scrape, but the family had left the area.

=== Republic of Texas (1836 – 1846) ===
By 1838, William obtained a contract to operate his ferry to Beaumont, and owned two slaves. Later that year, the local board accepted land applications from members of the Ashworth family, issuing them land certificates. At this time, most free Black people in the area were members of the Ashworth family.

The family became early Texan cattle barons, bringing over the cattle-tending practices they had developed on the Peedee River in South Carolina. In 1845, William was sued by Joseph and Nancy Hutchinson, under the claim that William's ferry violated the ferry license they possessed. They sought one thousand in damages, but the suit was dismissed. In 1847, William's license to operate the Santa Ana Ferry, near the modern-day ExxonMobil Beaumont Refinery, was revoked in favor of Hutchinson.

The Republic of Texas stripped Black people of the rights to vote, serve on juries, and hold office. The Constitution of the Republic of Texas initially proposed to ban all free people of color from the republic, but the Texas Congress was persuaded to allow those previously residing in the republic to remain. This was reconsidered in February 1840, when the Congress passed a law stating all free Black people had to vacate the republic by 1842. Those who did not would be subject to fines, and slavery upon failure to pay said fines. Local residents, including William M. McFaddin, took issue with this law, and signed petitions in support of the Ashworth family. Congressman Joseph Grigsby presented these petitions to the Congress in November 1840, after which he headed a committee which concluded that the Ashworths should be excluded from the ban. On December 12, 1840, the Ashworth Act was signed into law by Mirabeau B. Lamar, allowing all free people of color present within Texas before the Texas Declaration of Independence to remain in the republic.

In 1842, traveling land commissioners from the Texas General Land Office rejected the land certificates owned by the Ashworth family, stating its regulations did not include ownership of lands by free Black people. Roughly seventy residents of the county, including all three local land commissioners, petitioned the Texas Congress to pass an act acknowledging their land claims directly. In response, a bill was passed which issued patents on certificates issued by the Jefferson County Board, which Texan President Sam Houston signed into law in January 1843.

=== State of Texas ===
Map of Texas, highlighting counties the family owned land in during the year 1850. Note land owned further to the west.

By the first year of Texas statehood in 1846, there were thirteen Ashworth households in Jefferson County. The families were some of the most affluent in the county, and Aaron Ashworth was the wealthiest person in the county by 1850, owning a herd of 2,750 cattle. They also owned several slaves. The family often obtained headrights further west, due to land availability in Jefferson County lowering by the time their patents had been approved. By 1850, they owned thousands of acres in the counties of Orange, Jefferson, Williamson, Bell, and McLennan.

Scholar Jason A. Gillmer states growing antagonism to free people of color manifested itself via an increase of criminal accusations against the Ashworth family. He suggests Aaron's decision to obtain a private tutor for his children due to them being banned from white schools may have incensed his neighbors. They were accused of various offenses, such as playing cards, battery, larceny and stealing cattle. Some of the charges were quashed, but members of the family sometimes did not even show up to court. J.P. Barnes threatened to sue Abner Ashworth for slander unless he paid him two thousand dollars. Gillmer states he was reportedly playing on Abner's fear of losing property in courts, due to being of African descent.

Gillmer states that as the Civil War approached, the Ashworth family and their white spouses were targeted by locals seeking to create stronger delineations between races. There were seventeen indictments against members of the Ashworth family for "irregular sexual relations". Two were for adultery, and fifteen were for fornication. All were later quashed. Three were for Henderson Ashworth, who had been legally married to his white wife in Louisiana. This marriage was considered a "miscegenetic union" by the State of Texas and thus not recognized as legal. (Note: Henderson's case went to the Texas Supreme Court, due to a five-hundred dollar security pledge by David Garner, one of the first residents of the county.) In 1847, Sillistia Gallier and Margaret Ashworth were told by a court that Gallier's charge of marrying a colored women would be dismissed if they left the county. They moved to Calcasieu Parish afterwards and started a family. Several other members of the family were repeatedly brought to court for similar charges between 1847 and 1855.

=== Orange County War (1856) ===
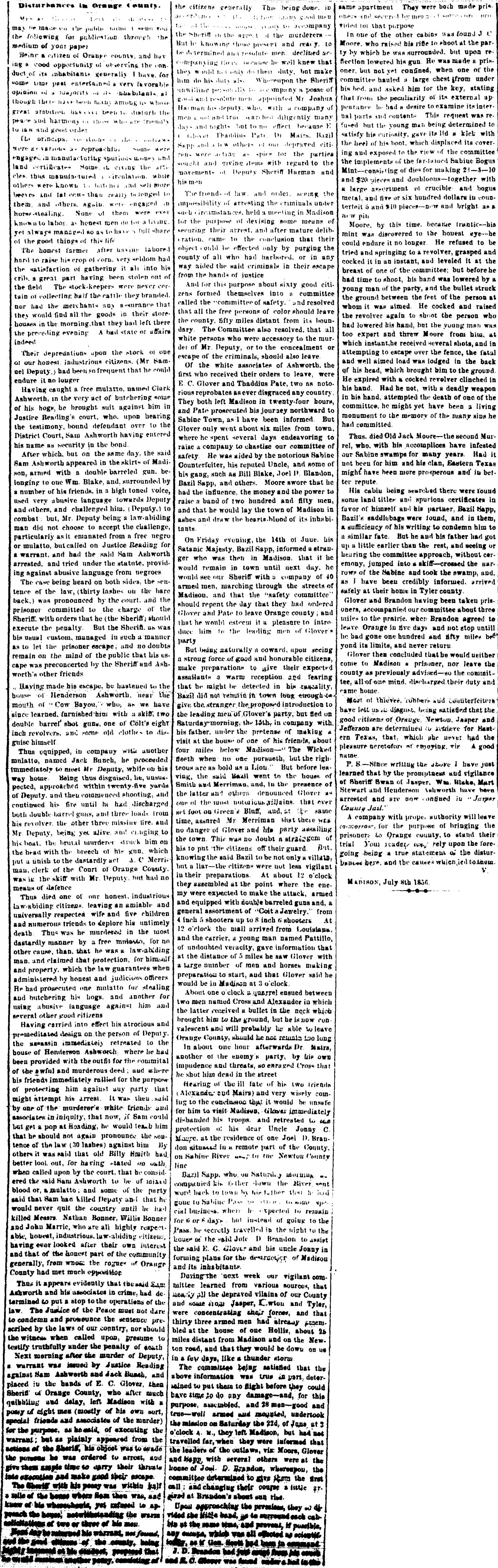
The Orange County War described in the Galveston News, July 15, 1856.

By 1856, there were one hundred free people of color in Orange County, the most of any county in the state. In June and July 1856, there was an armed struggle between two factions, one composed of whites and free Black people, and the other with only whites. They were known as the Regulators or "Negro party" and the Moderators or "law and order party" respectively.

==== Course of the conflict ====
The initial cause of the conflict was a dispute between Clark Ashworth and Samuel Deputy, a white deputy who accused Clark of butchering hogs he did not own. Clark's cousin Sam challenged Deputy to a duel, but he arrested him under a statute regarding "providing against abusive language from negroes." Sam Ashworth left on bond, and ambushed Deputy shortly after with another free Black man, Jack Bunch. They killed Deputy, and a vigilante committee formed in response. The County sheriff refused to accompany the vigilantes, but his own group failed to find them.

The Orange County War was documented by Frederick Law Olmsted. His writings, along with news articles, indicate the county erupted into a minor war during the summer. A heavily armed "Committee of Safety" composed of sixty white men ordered all free Black people to leave the county immediately. Many African-Americans crossed the Sabine River into Louisiana, and the sheriff fled town. The Ashworths formed their own group in response to the Moderators, and planned to attack the committee in Madison, but they were alerted beforehand. The same day in Madison, Regulators and Moderators began shooting each other dead in the street.

The Moderators drove the Ashworth's cattle away and stole many of their horses. Documentation indicates several assassinations, house-burnings, shootings, and fights took place over the course of the war, causing fear in the local citizenry. A group of Moderators located the sheriff and executed him in a field, after shooting his uncle to death. They forced the Regulators to surrender and expelled them from the county.

==== Exodus and aftermath (1856 – 1900) ====
Some members of the family moved back to Calcasieu Parish after the deaths of the sheriff and their allies, which the local newspaper reported on positively. Abner Ashworth began selling off his land in the county the same year, stating he was compelled to remove his children from the county due to the war.

William Ashworth took out a loan in 1856, but could not pay it back, and began selling off his land and town lots in 1857. The local sheriff seized all of his cattle under a specific brand and auctioned them off due to William's creditors. By 1860, William worked as a laborer rather than as a farmer, to support his wife. Aaron Ashworth's estate had reduced by 50%, and his herd had reduced to twenty cattle. He died in 1862, and William died two years later. Only twenty-nine free people of color remained in Orange County in 1860. After fleeing the county, some members of the family were able to increase their landholdings again.

The Ashworths in Calcasieu Parish continued to live and intermarry with the Perkins and Goins families through the rest of the 18th century, being recognized as mulatto within Louisiana, rather than fully integrating into white or Black society. Ashworths in Texas instead hid their ethnic pasts, and passed as white. In 1858, the court of Texas upheld a legislative ban on free Black people, stating they were de facto slaves. Afterwards, some members of the family migrated to the counties of Galveston, Brazoria, and Calhoun, and were listed as white on the 1860 census. The Ashworths were unable to rebuild their Antebellum era fortunes after the Civil War.

== Modern times ==
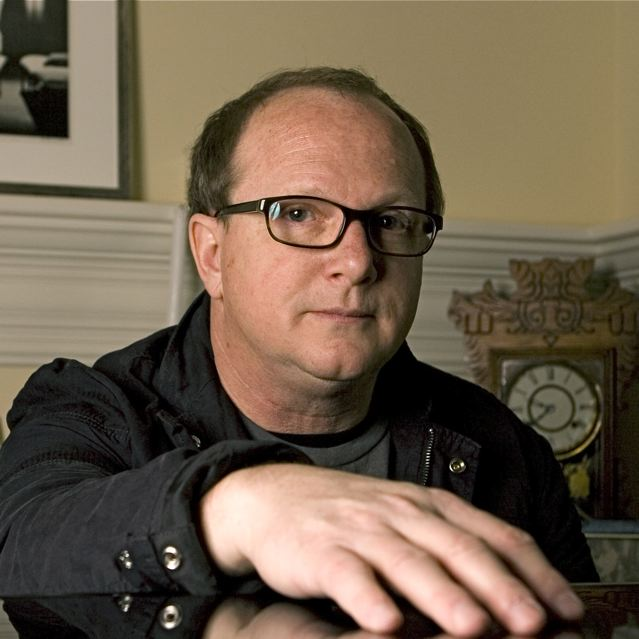
Charlie Peacock, a descendant of the Ashworth family.

Members of the Ashworth family still live in the counties of Orange and Jefferson today. One member denies African heritage, stating the family was solely white.

In 2009, the gravestone of William Ashworth's wife was located under the shed of a couple living in north Beaumont. Beaumont historian W. T. Block stated she was buried at Spell Cemetery, near her son. The president of the Spell Cemetery Association stated the same, and noted her headstone was one of two known to be missing.

In 2023, Ramona Young, a woman with ancestral ties to the Ashworths, began researching for a play about the history of the family, completing it by 2025. In 2025, A local filmmaker descended from the family took part in a documentary with Young for the John Jay French Museum. Young states the museum was chosen due to the French and Ashworth families being contemporaries.

American singer Charlie Peacock, originally Charlie Ashworth, says he began including references to his family history in his music after discovering his ancestor was a member of the Ashworth family. He notes that the Ashworth and Perkins families did not necessarily self-identify as Redbones, but he had decided to himself.

== See also ==
- Black Codes (United States)
- Black cowboys
- Black homesteaders
- Black land loss in the United States
- Blackwell Family of Virginia
- Brandywine people
- Bunch family
- Carmel Melungeons
- Chavis family
- Dominickers
- Gibson family (Virginia)
- Healy family
- History of African Americans in Texas
- Mass racial violence in the United States
- Microhistory
- Piney Woods
- Quander family
- Regulator–Moderator War
- Sam Ashworth (songwriter)
- Syphax family

== Bibliography ==
- Gillmer, Jason A. (2017). Finkelman, Paul; Huebner, Timothy S. (eds.). Slavery and Freedom in Texas: Stories from the Courtroom, 1821–1871. Southern Legal Studies. Athens, GA: The University of Georgia Press. ISBN 9780820351322. LCCN 2016055423.
- Muir, Andrew Forest (April 1950). "The Free Negro in Jefferson and Orange Counties, Texas". The Journal of Negro History. 35 (2). Association for the Study of African American Life and History: 183–206. JSTOR 2715860.
- Gillmer, Jason (23 February 2011). "Shades of Gray: The Life and Times of a Free Family of Color on the Texas Frontier" (PDF). Law and Inequality. 29 (1). Minneapolis, MN: University of Minnesota Law School: 33–107. SSRN 1448739.
- Hashaw, Tim (2006). Children of Perdition. Melungeons and the Struggle of Mixed America. Macon, GA: Mercer University Press. ISBN 9780881460742.
- Hashaw, Tim (2007). The Birth of Black America: The First African Americans and the Pursuit of Freedom at Jamestown. New York, NY: Carroll & Graf Publishers. ISBN 978-0-78671-718-7.
