= Jane Larson =

American law professor (1958–2011)

Jane Larson (1958–2011) was the Voss-Bascom Professor of Law at the University of Wisconsin Law School, United States.

== Education and career ==
Born in Omaha, Nebraska, Larson was a Phi Beta Kappa, magna cum laude graduate of Macalester College and of University of Minnesota Law School. At Minnesota, she was a member of the Order of the Coif and Articles Editor of the Journal of Law and Inequality.

Larson served as law clerk to two U.S. Judges. From 1985–1986 she clerked for Minnesota Supreme Court Justice Rosalie E. Wahl. During the 1986–1987 court term she clerked for Judge Theodore McMillian of the U.S. Court of Appeals, Eighth Circuit.

In 1987, Larson began working as an associate for the Washington D.C. branch of the law firm Powell, Goldstein, Frazer & Murphy. In 1990 she joined the faculty of Northwestern University Law School, where she twice won the Robert Childs award for excellence in teaching. Larson joined the faculty of the University of Wisconsin Law School in 1996, where she remained for the rest of her life. She was active in the Association of American Law Schools.

== Scholarship and philosophy ==
During her time on faculty at Northwestern, Larson developed her theory of "sexual fraud" – "intentional lies made for the express purpose of gaining sexual consent that would otherwise have been withheld", in Larson's words – as a tort for which people could sue if they suffered damages such as sexually transmitted diseases.

Larson's 1993 Columbia Law Review article, "'Women Understand So Little, They Call My Good Nature "Deceit"': A Feminist Rethinking of Seduction", was widely acclaimed within the fields of legal theory and feminist thought.

In 1999, Oxford University Press published her book Hard Bargains: The Politics of Sex, co-authored with Linda Hirshman. The book offered a critical analysis of the power dynamics involved in heterosexual sex, a theme echoed in Larson's scholarly work on the legal histories of prostitution, rape and sexual harassment.

Other notable areas of scholarship included her participation in amicus briefs for Webster v. Reproductive Health Services and Planned Parenthood v. Casey, supporting reproductive rights, and her analysis of the legal rights of residents of the colonia settlements on the U.S. Mexico border.

== Death and influence ==
Larson died at her home in Madison, Wisconsin on December 24, 2011.

Professor Larson taught law in an unorthodox way, stressing the social, cultural, historical, and philosophical dimensions of legal outcomes. She influenced her students to rethink concepts such as property, free speech, and gender, and had an international following.
