= Denworth, Texas =

Ghost town in Texas, US

Denworth
- Ghost town
- Location in Texas
- Coordinates: 35.3939365°N 100.6079123°W
- Country: United States
- State: Texas
- County: Gray
- Elevation: 2,560 ft (780 m)

Denworth is a ghost town in Gray County, Texas, United States.

== History ==
Situated near Farm to Market Road 2857, Denworth was named for the nearby Fort Worth and Denver Railway. It was laid out in 1919. After the closing of Back's post office in 1928, Denworth's post office opened in September 1932, with Ina Marshal serving as postmistress. By 1945, the population was 100, and the post office closed in March 1946. The town was completely abandoned—besides a gas station—after the completion of Interstate 40.
