= Grandview-Hopkins Independent School District =

School district in Texas

Coordinates: 35.3056°N 101.0094°W

Grandview-Hopkins Independent School District is a public school district in Gray County, Texas (USA).

The district has one school that serves students in grades kindergarten through six. Students attend Junior High and High School in either Groom or Pampa.

In 2010, the school district was rated "Exemplary" by the Texas Education Agency.
