= Groom High School =

Location
- 304 West 3rd Street; Groom, Texas 79039; United States; 35.2049°N 101.1109°W

Information
- School type: Public High school
- Established: 1903
- School district: Groom Independent School District
- Principal: Stephen Vanderpool
- Staff: 18.67 (FTE)
- Grades: PK-12
- Enrollment: 135 (2023–2024)
- Student to teacher ratio: 7.23
- Colors: Red and black
- Athletics conference: UIL Class A
- Mascot: Tiger
- Yearbook: The Tiger
- Website: Groom High Schoo

Groom High School is a public high school located in the city of Groom in Carson County, Texas, United States. It is classified as a 1A school by the UIL. It is a part of the Groom Independent School District located in extreme southeastern Carson County. For the 2021–2022 school year, the school was given an "A" by the Texas Education Agency.

== Athletics ==
The Groom Tigers compete in:

- Basketball
- Cross country running
- Six-man football
- Tennis
- Track and field

=== State finalist ===
- Football - 1975 (class B), 1999 (six-man, div. 1), 2014 (six-man, div. 2)
