= Wesco, Texas =

Unincorporated community in Texas, US

Wesco
- Unincorporated community
- Location in Texas
- Coordinates: 35.4333802°N 100.7631962°W
- Country: United States
- State: Texas
- County: Gray
- Elevation: 2,776 ft (846 m)

Population (2000)
  - Total: 7

Wesco is an unincorporated community in Gray County, Texas, United States.

== History ==
Wesco is situated on the junction of Farm to Market Roads 1321 and 1474. The area used to be a carbon black plant owned by the Western Carbon Company. From the 1950s, the community declined, and as of 2000, the population was 7.
