= Groom, Texas =

- Town
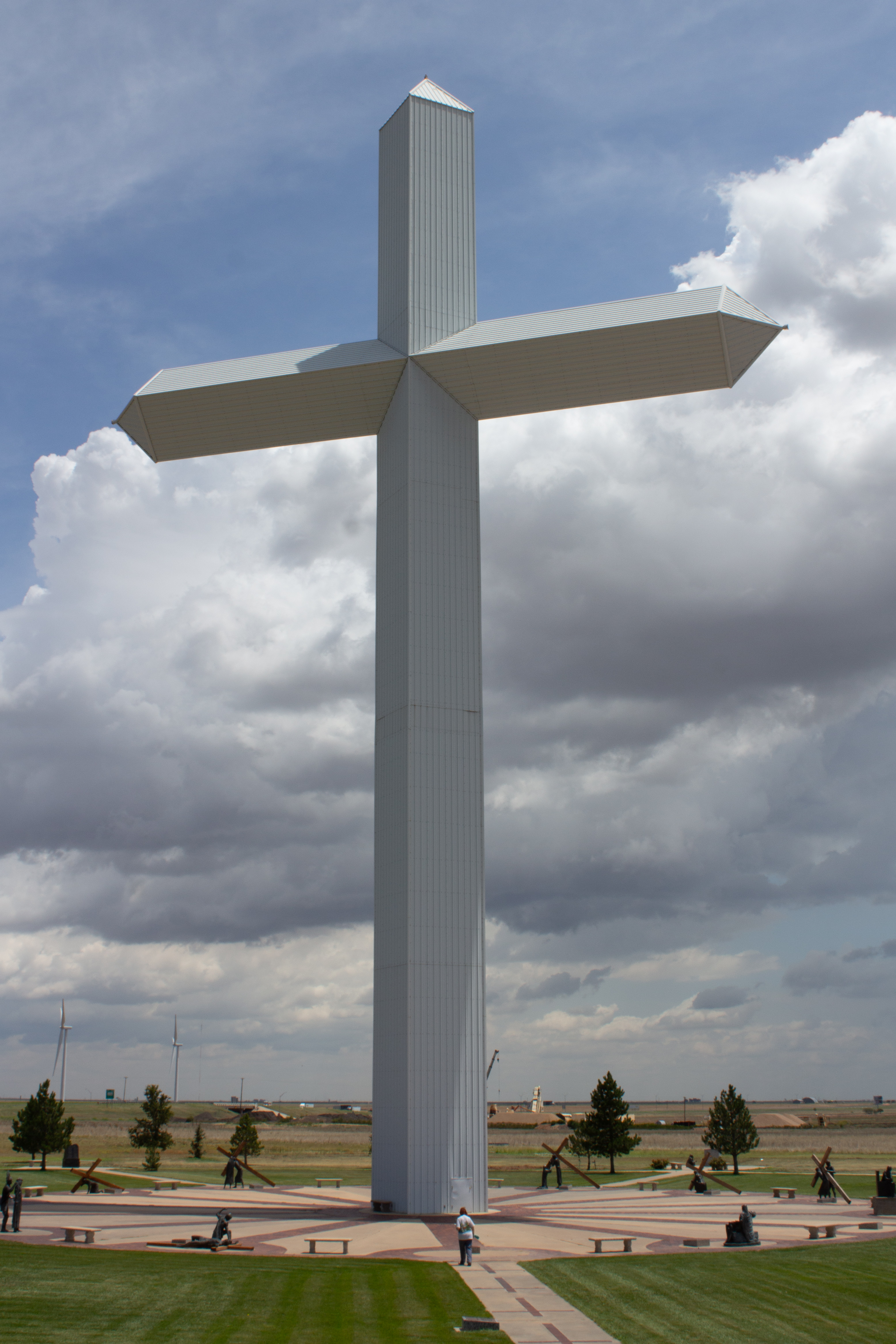
- The Cross of Our Lord Jesus Christ In Groom, Texas

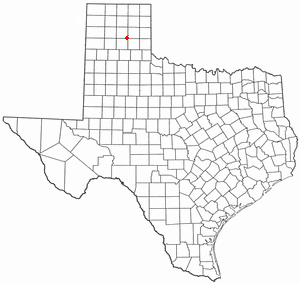
- Location of Groom, Texas

- Coordinates: 35°12′18″N 101°06′25″W
- Country: United States
- State: Texas
- County: Carson

Government
  - Type: Council-Manager

Area
  - Total: 0.75 sq mi (1.93 km^{2})
  - Land: 0.75 sq mi (1.93 km^{2})
  - Water: 0 sq mi (0.00 km^{2})
- Elevation: 3,251 ft (991 m)

Population (2020)
  - Total: 552
  - Density: 741/sq mi (286/km^{2})
- Time zone: UTC-6 (Central (CST))
  - Summer (DST): UTC-5 (CDT)
- ZIP code: 79039
- Area code: 806
- FIPS code: 48-31292
- GNIS feature ID: 2412711

Groom is a town in Carson County, Texas, United States. The population was 552 at the 2020 census. It is part of the Amarillo metropolitan area. It is on Interstate 40, about 42 miles (68 km) east of Amarillo and 215 miles (346 km) west of Oklahoma City.

== Geography ==
Groom is located in the southeastern corner of Carson County. Interstate 40 (I-40) bypasses the town to the north, with access from exits 110 through 114. I-40 Business) passes through the center of town.

According to the United States Census Bureau, the town has a total area of 0.75 square miles (1.93 km^{2}), all land.

== Demographics ==
Historical population
Census	Pop.	Note	%±
1930	564		—
1940	475		−15.8%
1950	678		42.7%
1960	679		0.1%
1970	808		19.0%
1980	736		−8.9%
1990	613		−16.7%
2000	587		−4.2%
2010	574		−2.2%
2020	552		−3.8%
U.S. Decennial Census

As of the census of 2000, 587 people, 240 households, and 178 families resided in the town. The population density was 778.7 inhabitants per square mile (300.7/km^{2}). The 290 housing units had an average density of 384.7 per square mile (148.5/km^{2}). The racial makeup of the town was 94.72% White, 0.17% Native American, 0.17% Asian, 2.90% from other races, and 2.04% from two or more races. Hispanics or Latinos of any race were 4.77% of the population.

Of the 240 households, 31.3% had children under 18 living with them, 63.3% were married couples living together, 7.5% had a female householder with no husband present, and 25.8% were not families. About 25.8% of all households were made up of individuals, and 16.3% had someone living alone who was 65 or older. The average household size was 2.45, and the average family size was 2.92.

In the town, the age distribution was 26.6% under 18, 6.8% from 18 to 24, 23.9% from 25 to 44, 22.0% from 45 to 64, and 20.8% who were 65 or older. The median age was 40 years. For every 100 females, there were 95.0 males. For every 100 females 18 and over, there were 93.3 males.

The median income in the town for a household was $31,705 and for a family was $39,063. Males had a median income of $30,577 versus $24,500 for females. The per capita income for the town was $15,593. About 9.4% of families and 13.2% of the population were below the poverty line, including 22.0% of those under 8 and 11.8% of those 65 or over.

== Landmarks ==
=== Giant cross ===
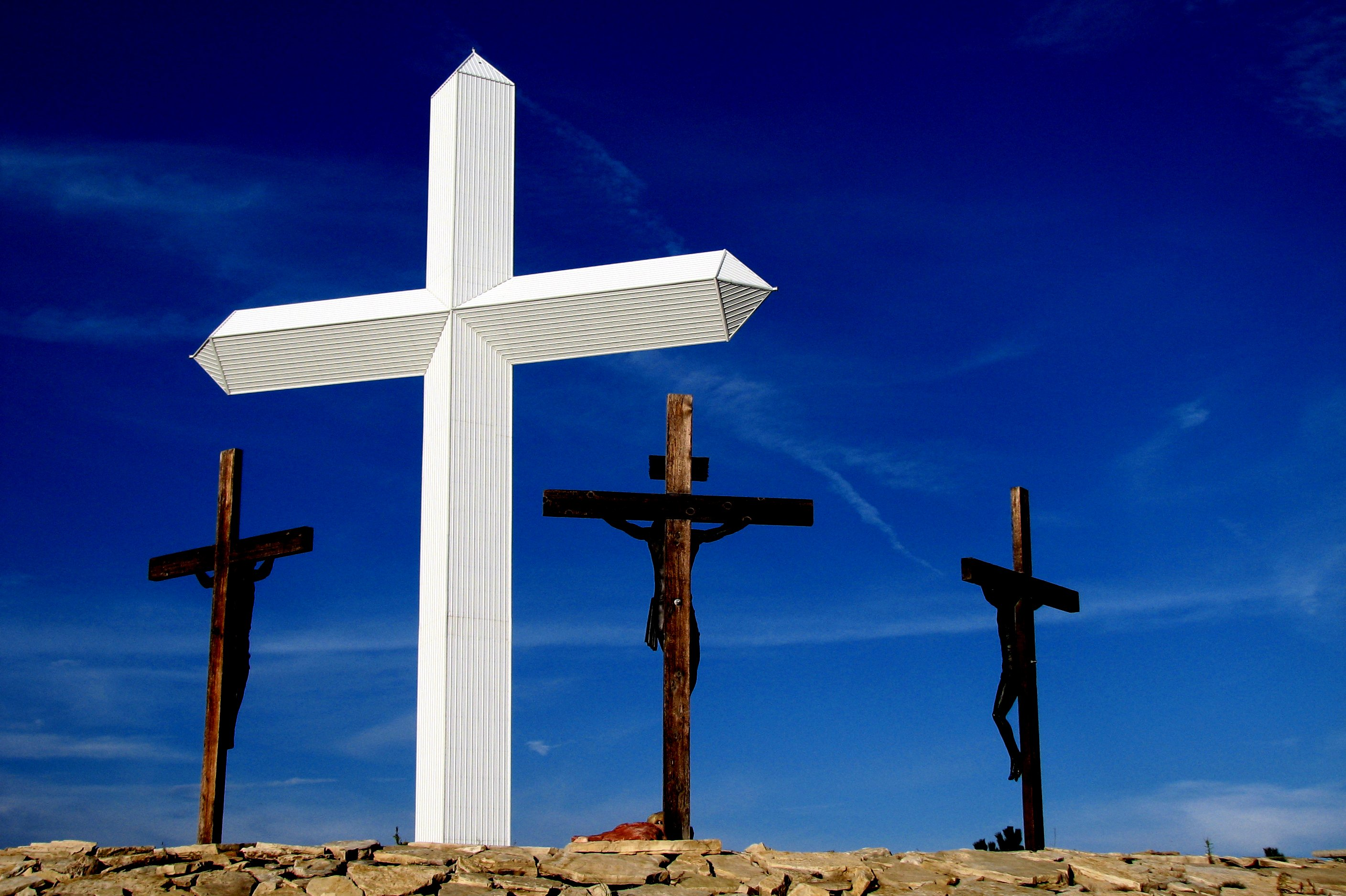
Cross of our Lord Jesus Christ

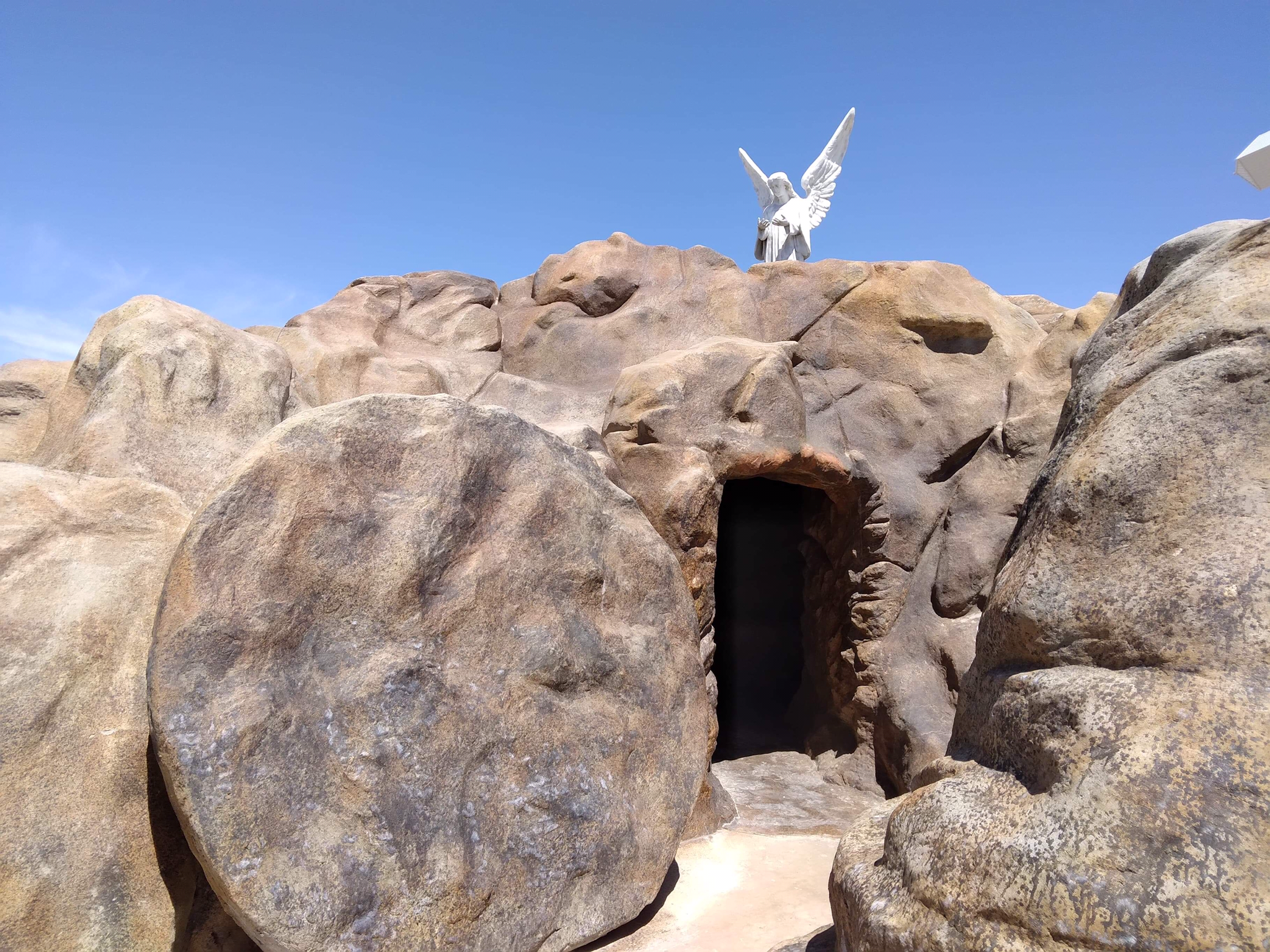
One of the Stations of the Cross at the site is a tomb

A 19-story cross erected by The Cross of Our Lord Jesus Christ Ministries is located next to I-40 northwest of the town limits. This 190-foot-tall (58 m), free-standing cross can be seen from 20 miles (32 km) away and 8 months were required to construct it. Surrounding the base of the cross are life-sized statues of the 14 Stations of the Cross. In addition to the giant cross and the Stations of the Cross, a visitor center, gift shop, and amphitheater are located at the site.

Inspired by this cross, residents of Effingham, Illinois, erected a similar cross that is 8 feet (2.4 m) taller. Though some tourist brochures claim this cross to be the largest in the Western Hemisphere, it is smaller than the Valle de los Caídos cross in Spain, which is elevated 500 feet (152.4 m) overground. The cross is also 18 feet (5.5 m) shorter than the 208 ft (63 m) cross at the Mission Nombre de Dios in St. Augustine, Florida, and shorter than the 213-foot-tall (65 m) Lakeuden Risti cross-shaped church tower in Seinäjoki, Finland. The movie Leap of Faith was filmed on location near the site of the cross in Groom, but the movie was filmed before the cross was built.

=== Leaning water tower ===
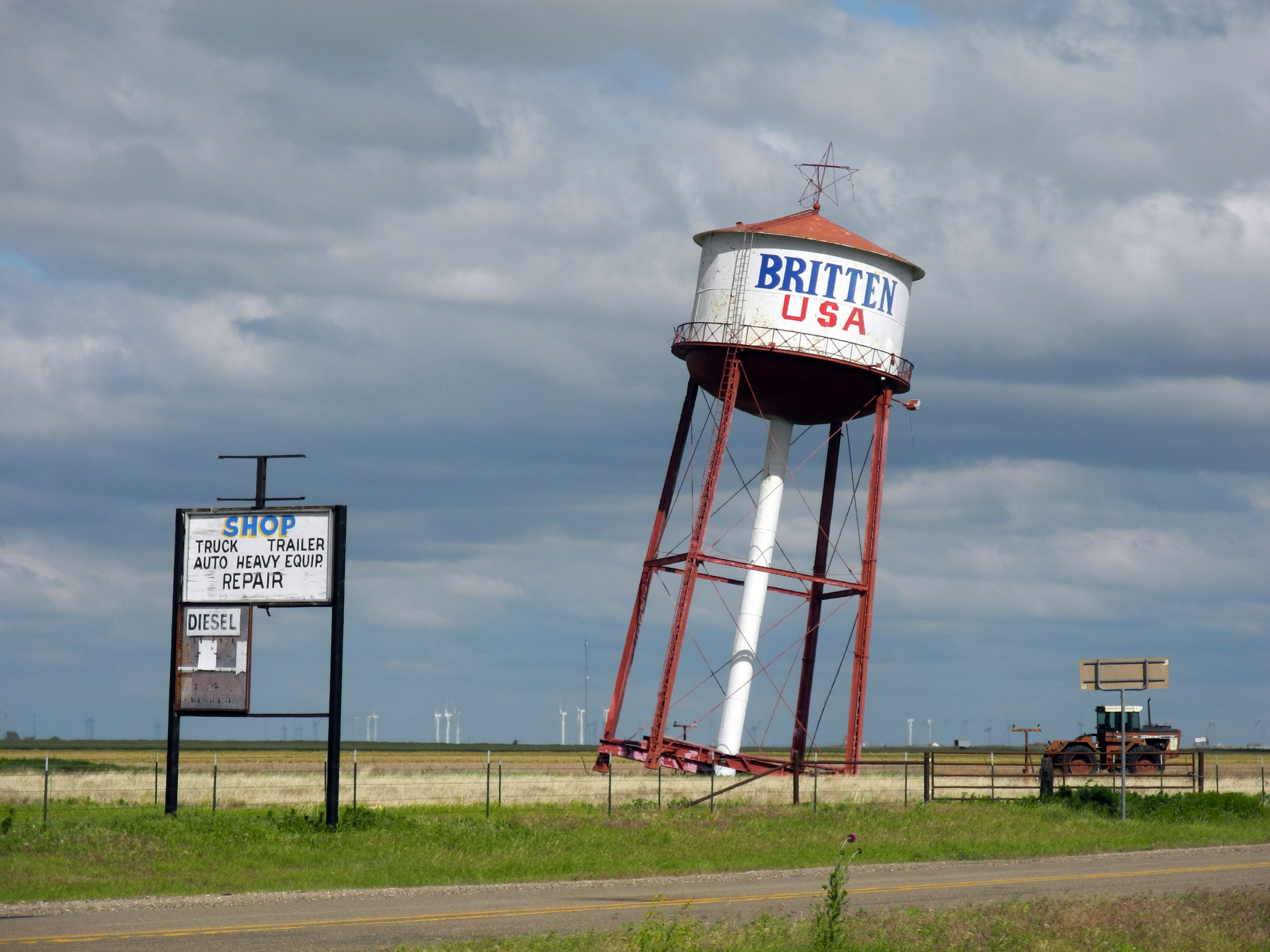
The Leaning Tower of Britten, found east of Groom along I-40 (old U.S. Route 66)

Also in Groom one can find a leaning water tower, sometimes called the Leaning Tower of Texas or the Leaning Tower of Britten, which currently serves as a decorative item and roadside attraction. The leaning tower was originally a functioning water tower, which was slated for demolition until Ralph Britten bought it and moved it to serve as a sign for his truck stop and tourist information center (located on a stretch of I-40 that was once a part of U.S. Route 66). This truck stop can still be seen, set back from the road behind the tower, now boarded up and in disrepair following a devastating fire decades ago.

The leaning water tower still remains a popular target for cameras, and the town of Groom turns on a large, colored star mounted on the top around Christmas time. The water tower is a common image from Route 66 photography books.

== Education ==
The Town of Groom is served by the Groom Independent School District.

== History ==
=== Early exploration ===
The route from Fort Smith, Arkansas, to Santa Fe, New Mexico, along the Canadian River was charted c. 1849 by Captain Randolph Barnes Marcy. Published in 1859, Marcy's book, The Prairie Traveler: A Handbook for Overland Expeditions, contained maps and illustrations of routes between the Mississippi and the Pacific and was used as a basic manual by westward-bound wagon trains and travelers for years.

=== Colonel B. B. Groom ===
Colonel B. B. Groom, an experienced cattleman near Lexington, Kentucky, leased from the New York and Texas Land Company 592,920 acres (2,399.5 km^{2}) of land in Hutchinson, Carson, Gray, and Roberts Counties in the Texas Panhandle in 1882, resulting in the organization of the Francklyn Land and Cattle Company. Groom purchased an estimated 1,300 head of shorthorns in 1882 and selected the Diamond F brand, approved by the Francklyn officials and filed as the company's brand in October 1882. Unfortunately, Groom's vision of the finest and most desirable cattle ranch in the United States did not materialize for him. The Francklyn Land and Cattle Company became insolvent in 1886. The bondholders foreclosed and organized a new company known as White Deer Lands (later White Deer Land Company), under the management of the agent Timothy Dwight Hobart, one of the subsequent founders of Pampa, Texas.

=== Harrison Groom ===
Colonel Groom's son, Harrison Groom, established a camp at the edge of a little lake just west of the present town of White Deer.

=== The town ===
The site of Groom was chosen in 1902, along the route of the Chicago, Rock Island and Gulf Railway. Groom was first incorporated in 1911.

== Notable people ==
- Leland Chapman, bounty hunter
- Steve Haskins, professional golfer

== See also ==
- List of municipalities in Texas
