= The Cross at the Crossroads =

Monument in Illinois

Coordinates: 39.1076°N 88.5714°W

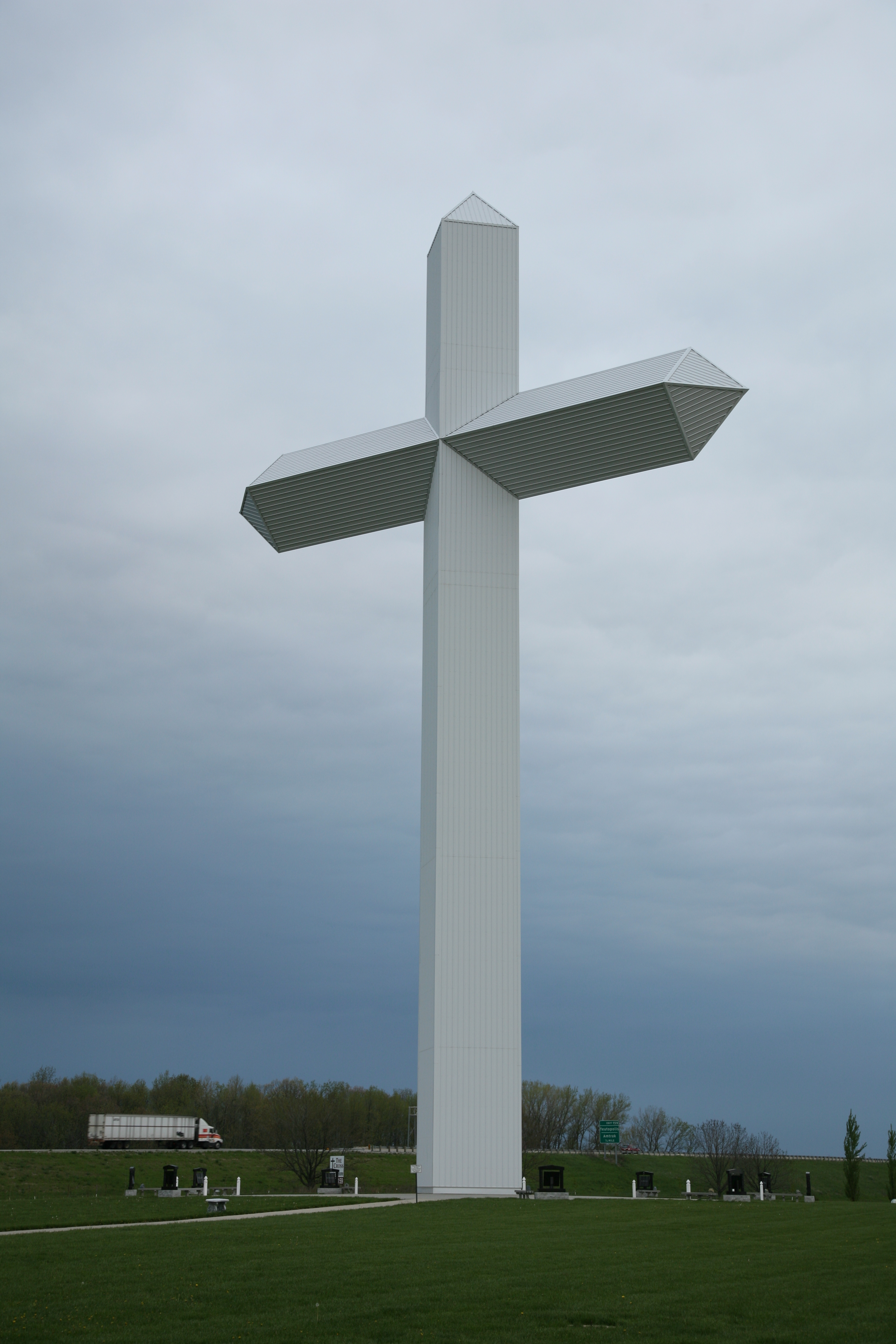
The Cross at the Crossroads, as seen from Interstate 70

The Cross at the Crossroads is a large roadside Christian cross sculpture off the intersection of Interstate 57 and Interstate 70 in Effingham, Illinois, United States. The cross measures 198 feet (60 m) tall and 113 feet (34 m) wide. Surrounding the cross on the ground are monuments for each of the Ten Commandments. Completed in 2001, the project cost more than $1 million to build. According to the Cross Foundation, the organization responsible for the cross's construction and maintenance, roughly 20 million people drive past the cross each year.

== History ==
The idea for the cross came during the fall of 1996, when Effingham residents John and Fran Schultz made their annual trip to Sun City, Arizona. Traveling along Interstate 40, the couple passed the town of Groom, Texas, and noticed its large cross, totaling 190 feet (58 m) in height, laying on the ground. On the return trip in spring 1997, they saw the erected cross. When they returned home, John and local businessman Bud Althoff began constructing a plan to build a similar cross in Effingham.

The individuals responsible for the construction of the Groom cross shared the blueprints of the design, though warned the men that it would be hard to find a suitable site for the cross. Indeed, plans to build the cross in nearby Teutopolis and Brownstown fell through, leading to concern about the viability of the project. John's son, Jack, along with several business partners made 8 acres (32,000 m^{2}) of land off the highway available.

After core samples were collected and the land was deemed suitable to build, the US Fabrication Company of Indianapolis, Indiana, was commissioned to construct the three pieces that made up the cross, and ARKA Builders constructed a reinforcement made of rebar around the base, pouring concrete into the base of the cross. The cross was dedicated in front of a large crown on September 16, 2001.

Upon its construction, the cross became the tallest in North America, a title it held until the Branson Cross in Walnut Shade, Missouri, with a height of 218 feet (66 m), was constructed in 2019. The cross's height of 198 feet (60 m) was a deliberate choice, as the Federal Aviation Administration requires structures above 200 feet (61 m) to put a light on top of the structure for the safety of aircraft.
