= Back, Texas =

Unincorporated community in Texas, US

Back
- Unincorporated community
- Location in Texas
- Coordinates: 35.3647702°N 100.6098567°W
- Country: United States
- State: Texas
- County: Gray
- Elevation: 2,700 ft (823 m)

Population (2000)
  - Total: 6

Back, formerly Pumpkin Ridge, is an unincorporated community in Gray County, Texas, United States.

== History ==
Settled in the late 1890s, Back is situated on the junction of Texas State Highway 273 and Farm to Market Road 1321. A post office opened in October 1899, and was named Northfork, for the North Fork Red River. John J. Simpkins served as first postmaster.

In the 1920s, oil and natural gas was discovered, and oil wells produced as many as 6,000 barrels a day. The Phillips Petroleum Company built an oil plant nearby. In 1927, real estate developers proposed the community of Back City, which was never built. In 1932, the Fort Worth and Denver Railway completed railroad in Back. The post office closed in 1928, and in September 1932, was reestablished in Denworth, causing the decline of the settlement. As of 2000, the population was 6.
