= Peter W. Gray =

American judge (1819–1874)

Peter W. Gray (December 12, 1819 – October 3, 1874) was an American lawyer, judge, and legislator from Texas. He represented Texas in the Confederate House of Representatives, and briefly served on the Texas Supreme Court.

== Early life ==
Gray was born to William Fairfax Gray and Mary "Millie" (Stone) Gray in Fredericksburg, Virginia on December 12, 1819. In 1838, he moved to Houston, Texas, with his parents and siblings. He read law with his father and was admitted to the bar.

== Career ==
After his father died, Gray was appointed Houston’s District Attorney on April 24, 1841, remaining in the job until Texas became a state in 1845. He also served the city of Houston as an Alderman and on the local board of health.

Gray was elected to the House of Representatives in the first Texas state legislature in 1846, then authored the first procedural code in Texas.

In 1848 he founded the Houston Lyceum, which later became the Houston Public Library. He was elected to the Texas State Senate in 1854, then served as a State District Court Judge from 1856 to 1861.

In 1861, Gray attended the Texas State Secession Convention, and voted to leave the union. In November that year, he was elected to the Confederate House of Representatives. After the war he returned to his law practice in Houston, Gray, Botts & Baker. In 1874 he quit his practice upon being appointed as an associate justice of the Texas Supreme Court, but served only a few months before resigning due to declining health.

== Death and legacy ==
Gray died at home in Houston of tuberculosis, and is buried in the Glenwood Cemetery in Houston. He was an active Episcopalian and a Mason. Gray County, Texas, is named in his honor.

Texas Senate
Preceded by David Y. Portis	Texas State Senator from District 17; 1854–1856	Succeeded by Mark M. Potter
