= Ashworth Act =

Law passed by the Republic of Texas

The Ashworth Act, was an act that was passed by the Texas Senate on December 12, 1840. It made the Ashworth Family as well as all free persons of color and emancipated slaves in the Republic of Texas exempt from a new law stipulating that all Black Texans either leave or risk being enslaved.

== Background ==
=== The Ashworths ===
The Ashworths were of free African-American origin. They migrated from South Carolina, then moved through Louisiana, finally ending their journey in the early 1830s in southeast Texas, at the town of Beaumont, when Texas was part of Mexico.

Prior to the 1836 ordinance passed by the General Council, the Ashworth family may have been viewed as white, at least socially, by Anglo-American settlers in Texas prior to 1836. They also owned slaves, raised cattle, and grew crops, and one of the brothers also became one of the largest stock raisers in the entire county.

=== Texas before 1840 ===
Immediately after winning independence from Mexico in 1836, the General Council of Texas implemented an ordinance prohibiting future immigration of black and free people of color, and took the draconian measure of forcing those already in Texas to leave. In the next paragraph, free people of color already in Texas were to be stripped of their citizenship and all the rights and privileges that accompanied it.

Soon after, in June 1837, the 1st legislative session after the constitution was adopted, Congress reversed this ordinance and allowed people of color "who were residing within the Republic of Texas at the date of the declaration of Independence" to stay in the country.

In the ensuing years, Texans both encouraged and developed the institution of slavery with remarkable vigor, turning Texas from a society with slaves into a "Slave Society". Most of the people who came to Texas after its independence were Southerners and identified with that particular way of life.

Multiple laws were passed in the favor of the white race and against people that were of African descent. Slavery became the official policy of Texan society. Blacks were welcomed to Texas, but only as slaves.

== 1840 and the Ashworth Act ==
On February 5, 1840, the Texas Congress passed an act that contradicted the act of 1837, reiterating the prohibition on free people of color emigrating into the then Republic of Texas. There also was an addition to the 1836 provision that ordered all free slaves and people of color "who are now in this Republic" to leave by January 1, 1842, unless they have obtained express permission to stay from the legislature. The penalty for disobedience, moreover, was severe. The person, formerly free, would be subjected to fines and, if unable to pay, sold to the highest bidder as a slave for life.

Many people of color began to rise up, and get the support they needed from their white neighbors through petitioning for their right to stay in Texas. This land to them is what they called home. Many people of color such as John and Charity Bird, Allen Dimery, Diana Leonard, James Richardson, Robert Thompson, Joseph Tate, and William Goyens (who all were freed slaves, partly black, and/or of color) were among the petitioners that fought for their right to stay in the Republic of Texas.

Several petitions were created on the behalf of these free people. Most notably and recognized of all the petitions written were of the Ashworths. Their petitions alone were what seemed to weigh the heaviest on the passing of the new act on December 12, 1840.

In the first petition of the Ashworths, 47 citizens endorsed and knew the Ashworths for years and swore that they were "peaceable and respectable citizens" and all the petitioners agreed that the act of February 5 of 1840 would "operate oppressively upon the said Ashworths, and they therefore asked Congress to exempt them from its general scope.

In the second petition that was submitted on behalf of William and his brother Abner Ashworth, 72 citizens from Jefferson County noted how the two, despite being "free persons of color," had "contributed generously to the advancement of the revolution." Signers of the petition were adamant that the passing of the recent act was both unfair and unjust to "force them from their County, whose battles they have fought and whose independence they assisted in achieving." The second petition put more weight on the issue and made for a stronger case for the Ashworths.

The third petition was created exclusively for the right of Elisha Thomas to continue to reside in Texas. Elisha had served in the army immediately after the Battle of San Jacinto. In all three cases, the petitions were signed by their neighbors, friends, and prominent officials in Jefferson County.

Representative Joseph Grigsby was one of the wealthiest slaveholders in Jefferson County and had great influence within the Republic of Texas. He introduced the Ashworths' petitions to the House. While there is no proof, it is assumed that the Ashworths or at least one of the members of the Ashworth family had good relations with Grigsby.

On November 5, 1840, the Speaker referred the petitions to a select committee made up of Grigsby and two others. The next day the committee reported back reaffirming that "as a general rule, it is not the true policy of this Country to encourage the introduction of this description of persons among us, nor even to allow them to remain." Grigsby's committee thought that the Ashworths "should be an exception to that rule". The committee noted the Ashworths' contribution to the independence of Texas and their aid in the building of their surrounding community.

Representative Joseph Grigsby did not sign the petition, but a family member of Joseph's named Nathaniel Grigsby did. Joseph Grigsby then, by family association of the petitioner Nathaniel Grigsby was able to testify as the committee and to sum up what the public thought of the Ashworths: "they have at all times conducted themselves well, and are men of good credit wherever they are known, having been at all times punctual to their engagements, up right in their dealings, and peaceable in their dispositions."

On November 23, 1840, the bill passed the Senate. The act then became law on December 12. Later the law was dubbed as the "Ashworth Act". It had a lasting impact; the final version extended its scope to include not just the Ashworths, but all free people of color who had arrived prior to the declaration of independence:

Be it enacted...That William Ashworth, Abner Ashworth, David Ashworth, Aaron Ashworth, Elisha Thomas, and all free persons of color, together with their families, who were residing in Texas on the day of the declaration of independence, are, and shall be exempt from the operation and provisions of an act of Congress, entitled "An act concerning Free Persons of Color,"... and that the above named persons, with their families are hereby granted permission to remain in this republic. All free people of color who had come to Texas before March 2, 1836, the absolute right to remain, "anything in the laws of the country to the contrary notwithstanding." (Shades 74)

== Notes ==
- (1) See Application for Veteran Land Certificate, Delaide Ashworth, Widow of William Ashworth, Voucher File No. 1110, at B (May 5, 1884) (affidavit of Delaide Ashworth) (collection of Texas General Land Office) (on file with author) (indicating that William served in the Texas army during the fall of 1835).
- (2) Slave Inhabitants, Jefferson County, Tex. 819, in BUREAU OF THE CENSUS, supra note 36 (listing Aaron Ashworth as the owner of six slaves, Abner three, William two, and Joshua one). Copies of deed records in which the Ashworths bought and sold slaves can be found in the Jefferson County Civil Court and the Orange County Civil Court. For a general discussion of slave ownership among free people of color, see IRA BERLIN, SLAVES WITHOUT MASTERS: THE FREE NEGRO IN THE ANTEBELLUM SOUTH 269-75 (1974).
- (3) J. Res., 1st Cong., 1838 Repub. Tex. Laws 231 (June 5, 1837), reprinted in 1 THE LAWS OF TEXAS, supra note 124, at 1291
- Act Approved Feb 5, 1840, 4th Cong., R.S. Sect 1, 1840 Repub. Tex. Laws 151,
- The Laws of Texas, supra section 8,10 of the 1840 act
- The Laws of Texas, supra sections 2, 8
