= Hoover, Texas =

Unincorporated community in Texas, US

Hoover
- Unincorporated community
- Location in Texas
- Coordinates: 35.5939333°N 100.8507004°W
- Country: United States
- State: Texas
- County: Gray
- Elevation: 3,045 ft (928 m)

Population (2000)
  - Total: 5

Hoover is an unincorporated community in Gray County, Texas, United States.

== History ==
Established in 1887 on the Panhandle and Santa Fe Railway, Hoover coins its namesake from businessman and landowner Harvey E. Hoover. As the town began to grow, a post office was formed, with E. D. McClain becoming postmaster. It was then closed in 1914, but later reopened in 1915 until its final closure in 1972, due to the declining population. It was a shipping point for cattle drovers during the 1920s, and soon became known for the oil discovered there in the 1930s. From the 1940s onward, Hoover declined, and as of 2000 the population was 5.
