= Henry Howell Williams =

American merchant

- Born: 1796; Providence, Rhode Island
- Died: December 17, 1873 (aged 76–77); Baltimore
- Spouse: Rebecca Wilkins
- Parent(s): Howell Williams and Dorothy (Wheat) Williams
- Relatives: Samuel May Williams, Nathaniel Felton Williams (b. 1800) (brothers); Nathaniel Felton Williams (uncle)

Henry Howell Williams (1796 – December 17, 1873) was an American merchant.

== Early life ==
Henry Howell Williams was born in 1796 to Howell Williams and Dorothy (Wheat) Williams in Providence, Rhode Island. His older brother was Samuel May Williams.

== Career ==
Williams started work as a sailor from a young age. He joined the Colombian Navy as a young man, serving for several years. After ending his tour with the Colombian Navy, he visited San Felipe de Austin, where his brother Samuel was a legal secretary for the colony. Williams applied for a Mexican land grant, but left before establishing his claim. He instead returned to the United States to work in Baltimore for a merchant, his uncle, Nathaniel Felton Williams.

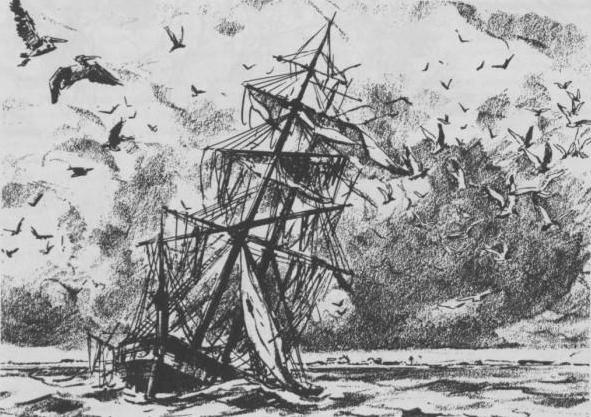
Invincible depicted as wrecked in 1837

Williams was a financier of the Texas Revolution. He managed a family commission house in Baltimore, where he transferred his letters of credit to Samuel, who supplied the Texas Navy with the ammunition, guns, and the schooner Invincible. After Texas gained independence, Williams assisted its Navy again while acting as Texas Consul to the United States. He was a liaison between the Texans and the shipbuilder Nicholas Dawson, who supplied six new ships.

Williams dispatched the first direct shipment from Texas to England. He delivered cargoes of supplies to the McKinney and Williams wharf, guaranteed advances to Texas cotton planters, and loaded cotton onto the large English brig, Ambassador.

Williams was appointed to serve as president of the board of directors of the Galveston City Company. He was an investor in shares of the company, and invested in other Texas real estate. He operated his own eponymous commission house in Baltimore, H. H. Williams and Company. In 1842, he created a Galveston branch when he acquired McKinney and Williams from his brother Samuel, and Thomas F. McKinney. Threat of invasion by Mexico, however, dampened commerce between Galveston and the United States as firms in New Orleans avoided putting their ships as risk. A hurricane and a ruined cotton crop in 1842 were all factors when Williams filed for bankruptcy.

In 1847, Williams raised capital in New York and New Orleans for Commercial & Agricultural Bank, a firm founded by Samuel.

== Death ==
Williams died on December 17, 1873, in Baltimore. His estate included substantial property in Galveston.
