= Jose Antonio Saucedo =

Mexican politician

José Antonio Saucedo (20 November 1773 – April 1832) was a Mexican politician.

José Antonio Saucedo served the local government ayuntamiento of San Fernando de Béxar in the early 19th-century. He served as its secretary in 1823, and he signed declarations of Texas’ intention to comply with the Plan of Casa Mata.

During Stephen F. Austin's early attempt to establish a colony in Texas, Saucedo urged discontented settlers to recognize Austin's local authority. By April 1824, however, Saucedo reduced the fees Austin charged settlers for surveying and administrating the Mexican land grants. He continued to back Austin's authority within the colony. After briefly acting as governor of Texas in the first part of 1824, he established the boundaries and regulations for the Stephen F. Austin Colony after August 1824 under the authority of the newly established state of Coahuila and Texas.
