= Margaret Henson =

American historian (1924–2001)

- Born: Margaret Louise Swett; January 3, 1924 (age 102); Chicago, Illinois, U.S.
- Died: January 22, 2001 (aged 77)
- Education: Glenbard High School; University of Houston
- Occupations: Historian; archivist; author
- Spouse(s): Bill Nowotny (m. 1943, divorced) J. Scott Henson (m. 1951)
- Children: 5
- Parent(s): William Claude Swett; Clara Kaufman

Margaret Louise Swett Henson (January 3, 1924 – January 22, 2001) was an American historian, archivist, and author specializing in 19th-century Texas history.

== Biography ==
Born Margaret Louise Swett on January 3, 1924, to William Claude and Clara (née Kaufman) Swett in Chicago, she was raised near Chicago and attended Glenbard High School. She enrolled at the University of Texas in 1941, but did not graduate. Henson earned her bachelor's degree from the University of Houston in 1962, her master's degree in 1969, and her doctorate in history in 1974. She was an archivist and taught history at the University of Houston–Clear Lake. Henson's research and writing focused on the Texas Revolution and the Republic of Texas.

Henson was a member of the Tejano Association for Historic Preservation.

Henson married twice. She married Bill Nowotny in 1943, a union which produced two daughters. Margaret and Bill divorced about seven years later. She married J. Scott Henson in 1951. They had three sons. Henson died on January 22, 2001, and was interred at Memorial Oaks Cemetery, Houston.

== Selected works ==
- Samuel May Williams: Early Texas Entrepreneur. College Station: Texas A&M University Press. 1976. ISBN 0-89096-009-7. OCLC 1975978.
- Juan Davis Bradburn : A Reappraisal of the Mexican Commander of Anahuac. College Station: Texas A&M University Press. 1982. ISBN 0-585-17451-2. OCLC 44954442.
- Lorenzo de Zavala: The Pragmatic Idealist. Fort Worth: Texas Christian University Press. 1996. ISBN 0-585-03420-6. OCLC 42854533.
