= Groom Independent School District =

School district in Texas

Coordinates: 35.2043°N 101.1107°W

Address
- 304 W 3rd Groom Groom, Texas, 79039-0598; United States

District information
- Type: Public
- Grades: PK–12
- Superintendent: Jay Lamb
- Governing agency: Texas Education Agency
- Schools: 1
- NCES District ID: 4821840

Students and staff
- Enrollment: 150 (2022–2023)
- Teachers: 19.32 (on an FTE basis)
- Student–teacher ratio: 7.76

Other information
- Website: www.groomisd.net

Groom Independent School District is a public school district based in Groom, Texas, United States.

Located in Carson County, portions of the district extend into Armstrong, Donley, and Gray Counties.

Groom ISD has one school, Groom High School, that serves students in kindergarten through grade 12.

== History ==
The district changed to a mixed schedule in fall 2022, in which class is not held on either a Monday or a Friday.

== Academic achievement ==
In 2009, the school district was rated "recognized" by the Texas Education Agency.

== Special programs ==
=== Athletics ===
Groom High School plays six-man football.

== See also ==
- List of school districts in Texas
