= Law and Inequality =

Minnesota Journal of Law & Inequality
- Discipline: Law review
- Language: English
- Edited by: Jaxon Alston

Publication details
- History: 1981–present
- Publisher: University of Minnesota Law School (United States)
- Frequency: Biannually

Standard abbreviations
- Bluebook: Law & Ineq.
- ISO 4: Law Inequal.

Indexing
- ISSN: 0737-089X
- LCCN: 84644028
- OCLC no.: 60616345

Links
- Journal homepage

Minnesota Journal of Law & Inequality, (formerly Law & Inequality: A Journal of Theory and Practice) is a biannual peer-reviewed law journal edited by law students at University of Minnesota Law School. It was established in 1981 to examine the social impact of law on disadvantaged people.

In 2016, the journal launched its online companion site, Inequality Inquiry (formerly Sua Sponte).

The journal has been cited by federal and state courts, including:

- United States v. Virginia
- State v. Janes
- Sayers by Sayers v. Beltrami County
- Isabellita S. v. John S.
- Rio v. Rio
- Eastman v. Virginia Polytechnic Institute and State University

The journal is ranked first in the "Family Law" and "Immigration Law" subcategories on the Washington and Lee University law journal rankings for scholarly impact; third in the "Civil Rights" and "Minority and "Race and Ethnic Issues" subcategories; and in the top ten for "Criminal Law and Procedure" and "Gender, Women and Sexuality" subcategories.
