= William Fairfax Gray =

American and Texas lawyer

William Fairfax Gray (November 3, 1787 – 1841) was a lawyer and land agent in the United States and in the Republic of Texas.

== Early life ==
Gray was born on November 3, 1787, in Fairfax County, Virginia, to William and Catherine (Dick) Gray.

== Career ==
Gray joined the Virginia militia and was assigned to the Sixteenth Regiment as a Captain. He served this unit in the War of 1812. In 1821, he attained the rank of Lieutenant Colonel.

Gray scouted land in Mississippi and Texas for Thomas Green and Albert T. Brumley, land agents based in Washington, D.C. When he arrived in Texas in 1835, Texas territory controlled by Mexico. He was present at Washington-on-the-Brazos during the Convention of 1836 and maintained a detailed journal of the proceedings.

Gray was a founding member and an officer of the Philosophical Society of Texas.

== Family life ==
Gray was married to Millie Richards Stone Gray.

== Death and legacy ==
Gray died in Houston on April 16, 1841. He was buried at the Old City Cemetery in Houston. His remains were moved twice to other cemeteries in Houston: first to the Episcopal Cemetery, and finally to Glenwood Cemetery after 1872.

His journal was published posthumously in 1909 and titled, From Virginia to Texas, 1835.
