= Gray County, Texas =

County in Texas, United States

- County
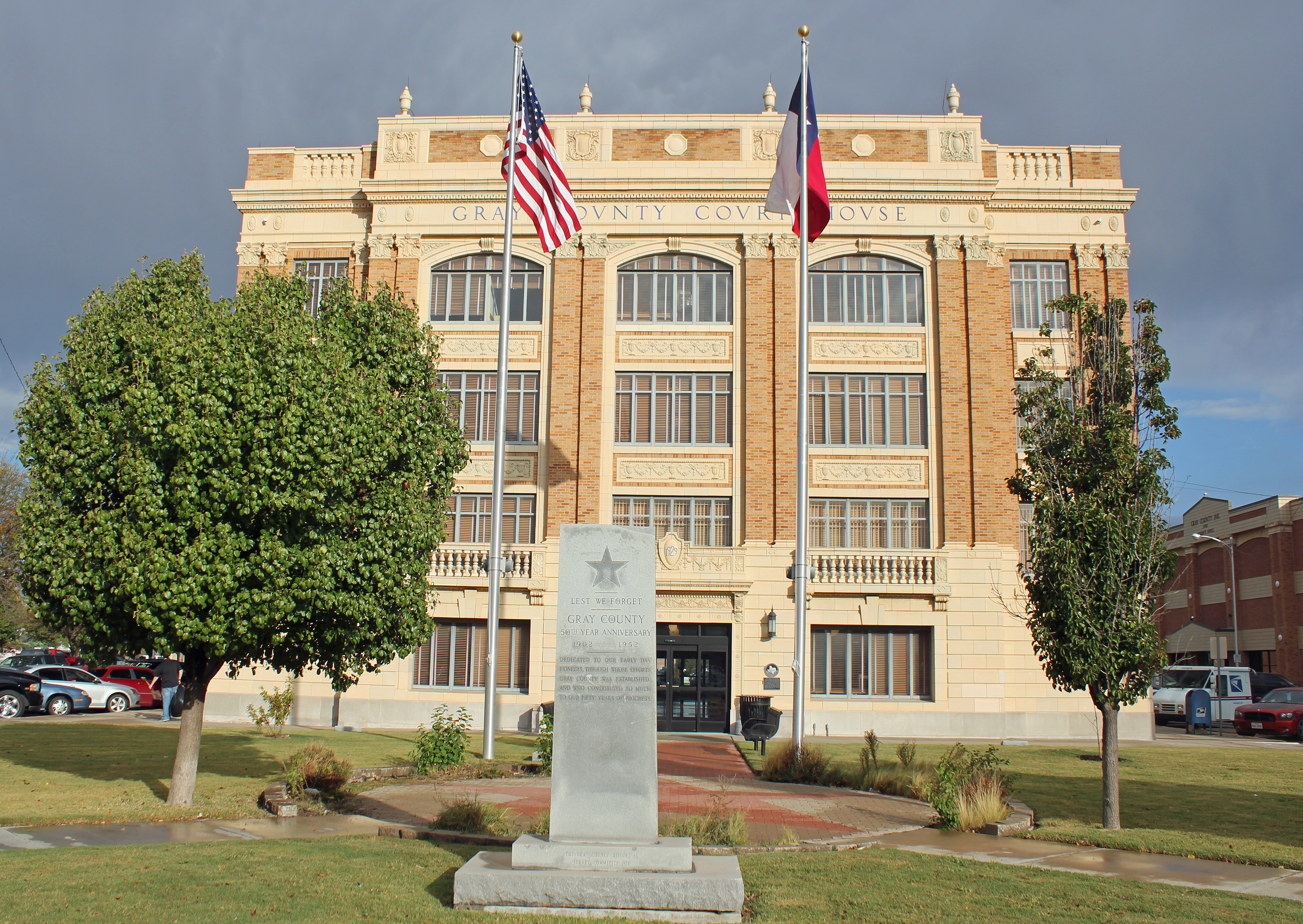
- The Gray County Courthouse

- Location within the U.S. state of Texas
- Coordinates: 35°25′N 100°49′W
- Country: United States
- State: Texas
- Founded: 1902
- Named for: Peter W. Gray
- Seat: Pampa
- Largest city: Pampa

Area
  - Total: 929 sq mi (2,410 km^{2})
  - Land: 926 sq mi (2,400 km^{2})
  - Water: 3.4 sq mi (8.8 km^{2}) 0.4%

Population (2020)
  - Total: 21,227
  - Estimate (2025): 20,919 ▼
  - Density: 23/sq mi (8.9/km^{2})
- Time zone: UTC−6 (Central)
  - Summer (DST): UTC−5 (CDT)
- Congressional district: 13th
- Website: www.co.gray.tx.us

Gray County is a county located in the U.S. state of Texas. As of the 2020 census, its population was 21,227. The county seat is Pampa. The county was created in 1876 and later organized in 1902. Gray County is named for Peter W. Gray, a Confederate lawyer and soldier in the American Civil War. Gray County comprises the Pampa, TX micropolitan statistical area.

== Geography ==
According to the U.S. Census Bureau, the county has a total area of 929 square miles (2,410 km^{2}), of which 926 sq mi (2,400 km^{2}) are land and 3.4 sq mi (8.8 km^{2}) (0.4%) are covered by water.

=== Major highways ===
- Interstate 40
  - I-40 BL (McLean)
- U.S. Highway 60
- State Highway 70
- State Highway 152
- State Highway 273
- Loop 171
- Loop 271
- Spur 398

=== Adjacent counties ===
- Roberts County (north)
- Hemphill County (northeast)
- Wheeler County (east)
- Collingsworth County (southeast)
- Donley County (south)
- Armstrong County (southwest)
- Carson County (west)

=== National protected area ===
- McClellan Creek National Grassland

== Demographics ==
Historical population
Census	Pop.	Note	%±
1880	56		—
1890	203		262.5%
1900	480		136.5%
1910	3,405		609.4%
1920	4,663		36.9%
1930	22,090		373.7%
1940	23,911		8.2%
1950	24,728		3.4%
1960	31,535		27.5%
1970	26,949		−14.5%
1980	26,386		−2.1%
1990	23,967		−9.2%
2000	22,744		−5.1%
2010	22,535		−0.9%
2020	21,227		−5.8%
2025 (est.)	20,919	▼	−1.5%
U.S. Decennial Census; 1850–1900 1910; 1920 1930 1940; 1950 1960 1970; 1980 1990 2000; 2010 2020

=== Racial and ethnic composition ===
Gray County, Texas – Racial and ethnic composition Note: the US Census treats Hispanic/Latino as an ethnic category. This table excludes Latinos from the racial categories and assigns them to a separate category. Hispanics/Latinos may be of any race.
Race / Ethnicity (NH = Non-Hispanic)	Pop 2000	Pop 2010	Pop 2020	% 2000	% 2010	% 2020
White alone (NH)	17,800	15,564	13,025	78.26%	69.07%	61.36%
Black or African American alone (NH)	1,309	1,055	835	5.76%	4.68%	3.93%
Native American or Alaska Native alone (NH)	169	152	141	0.74%	0.67%	0.66%
Asian alone (NH)	88	83	127	0.39%	0.37%	0.60%
Pacific Islander alone (NH)	4	1	0	0.02%	0.00%	0.00%
Other race alone (NH)	18	11	37	0.08%	0.05%	0.17%
Mixed race or Multiracial (NH)	397	304	715	1.75%	1.35%	3.37%
Hispanic or Latino (any race)	2,959	5,365	6,347	13.01%	23.81%	29.90%
Total	22,744	22,535	21,227	100.00%	100.00%	100.00%

=== 2020 census ===
As of the 2020 census, the county had a population of 21,227. The median age was 39.2 years. 24.1% of residents were under the age of 18 and 17.5% of residents were 65 years of age or older. For every 100 females there were 111.1 males, and for every 100 females age 18 and over there were 111.7 males age 18 and over.

The racial makeup of the county was 68.9% White, 4.1% Black or African American, 1.0% American Indian and Alaska Native, 0.6% Asian, <0.1% Native Hawaiian and Pacific Islander, 12.6% from some other race, and 12.8% from two or more races. Hispanic or Latino residents of any race comprised 29.9% of the population.

79.5% of residents lived in urban areas, while 20.5% lived in rural areas.

There were 7,939 households in the county, of which 33.0% had children under the age of 18 living in them. Of all households, 49.9% were married-couple households, 18.9% were households with a male householder and no spouse or partner present, and 26.4% were households with a female householder and no spouse or partner present. About 29.1% of all households were made up of individuals and 14.1% had someone living alone who was 65 years of age or older.

There were 9,996 housing units, of which 20.6% were vacant. Among occupied housing units, 73.0% were owner-occupied and 27.0% were renter-occupied. The homeowner vacancy rate was 3.4% and the rental vacancy rate was 19.6%.

=== 2000 census ===
As of the 2000 census, 22,744 people, 8,793 households, and 6,049 families were residing in the county. The population density was 24 people per square mile (9.3 people/km^{2}). The 10,567 housing units averaged 11 units per square mile (4.2/km^{2}). The racial makeup of the county was 82.15% White, 5.85% African American, 0.94% Native American, 0.39% Asian, 8.25% from other races, and 2.42% from two or more races. About 13.01% of the population was Hispanic or Latino of any race.

Of the 8,793 households, 30.00% had children under the age of 18 living with them, 57.00% were married couples living together, 9.00% had a female householder with no husband present, and 31.20% were not families. About 28.70% of all households were made up of individuals, and 15.30% had someone living alone who was 65 years of age or older. The average household size was 2.39, and the average family size was 2.93.

In the county, the age distribution was 24.00% under 18, 8.40% from 18 to 24, 27.20% from 25 to 44, 22.30% from 45 to 64, and 18.10% who were 65 or older. The median age was 39 years. For every 100 females, there were 104.00 males. For every 100 females age 18 and over, there were 103.70 males.

The median income for a household in the county was $31,368, and for a family was $40,019. Males had a median income of $32,401 versus $20,158 for females. The per capita income for the county was $16,702. About 11.20% of families and 13.80% of the population were below the poverty line, including 17.60% of those under age 18 and 9.60% of those age 65 or over.

== Communities ==
=== City ===
- Pampa (county seat)

=== Towns ===
- Lefors
- McLean

=== Census-designated place ===
- Alanreed

=== Other unincorporated communities ===
- Back
- Hoover

== Politics ==
Prior to 1952, Gray County was primarily Democratic similar to most of Texas and the Solid South. The county only gave a Republican presidential candidate a majority before 1952 in 1928, when Herbert Hoover won the county due to anti-Catholic sentiment towards Al Smith. Starting with the 1952 election, the county has become a Republican stronghold along with the rest of the Texas Panhandle. This level of Republican dominance has increased in recent years, as every Republican presidential candidate in the second millennium has racked up 80% of the county's vote. Additionally, after the 2012 election, Democrats Hillary Clinton, Joe Biden, and Kamala Harris have failed to win even 1,000 votes total in the county. However, the county has gradually swung leftward since the 2016 election from a 78.3% Republican margin of victory to 77.1%.

Gray County is located within District 88 of the Texas House of Representatives. Gray County is located within District 28 of the Texas Senate.

United States presidential election results for Gray County, Texas
Year	Republican		Democratic		Third party(ies)	
Year	No.	%	No.	%	No.	%
1912	13	3.09%	272	64.61%	136	32.30%
1916	69	11.73%	482	81.97%	37	6.29%
1920	251	30.95%	529	65.23%	31	3.82%
1924	581	48.86%	608	51.14%	0	0.00%
1928	1,871	65.35%	986	34.44%	6	0.21%
1932	505	12.70%	3,446	86.69%	24	0.60%
1936	464	9.59%	4,347	89.83%	28	0.58%
1940	1,217	21.97%	4,315	77.89%	8	0.14%
1944	1,739	34.86%	3,067	61.48%	183	3.67%
1948	1,594	27.98%	3,699	64.94%	403	7.08%
1952	5,467	61.73%	3,367	38.02%	23	0.26%
1956	5,047	61.90%	3,034	37.21%	72	0.88%
1960	6,197	68.76%	2,802	31.09%	14	0.16%
1964	5,011	57.93%	3,633	42.00%	6	0.07%
1968	5,994	55.53%	2,374	21.99%	2,427	22.48%
1972	7,968	84.37%	1,367	14.47%	109	1.15%
1976	6,010	60.33%	3,872	38.87%	80	0.80%
1980	7,187	70.81%	2,786	27.45%	176	1.73%
1984	8,955	81.50%	2,003	18.23%	30	0.27%
1988	7,259	74.22%	2,460	25.15%	62	0.63%
1992	6,105	58.86%	2,426	23.39%	1,841	17.75%
1996	6,102	69.15%	2,114	23.96%	608	6.89%
2000	6,732	82.25%	1,376	16.81%	77	0.94%
2004	7,260	84.69%	1,289	15.04%	23	0.27%
2008	6,924	85.13%	1,153	14.18%	56	0.69%
2012	6,443	87.20%	886	11.99%	60	0.81%
2016	6,500	87.78%	701	9.47%	204	2.75%
2020	6,840	87.90%	829	10.65%	113	1.45%
2024	6,691	88.27%	845	11.15%	44	0.58%

United States Senate election results for Gray County, Texas1
Year	Republican		Democratic		Third party(ies)	
Year	No.	%	No.	%	No.	%
2024	6,489	86.29%	878	11.68%	153	2.03%

United States Senate election results for Gray County, Texas2
Year	Republican		Democratic		Third party(ies)	
Year	No.	%	No.	%	No.	%
2020	6,705	87.21%	774	10.07%	209	2.72%

Texas Gubernatorial election results for Gray County
Year	Republican		Democratic		Third party(ies)	
Year	No.	%	No.	%	No.	%
2022	5,013	90.19%	478	8.60%	67	1.21%

== Education ==
School districts include:

- Fort Elliott Consolidated Independent School District
- Grandview-Hopkins Independent School District
- Groom Independent School District
- Lefors Independent School District
- McLean Independent School District
- Miami Independent School District
- Pampa Independent School District
- Wheeler Independent School District
- White Deer Independent School District

According to state law, all of the county is in the service area of Clarendon College.

== Notable people ==
- Tom Mechler, state Republican Party chairman since 2015, is a former Gray County Republican chairman.
- Trae Young, NBA player, was raised in Pampa while his father played pro-basketball overseas.

== See also ==
- List of museums in the Texas Panhandle
- National Register of Historic Places listings in Gray County, Texas
- Recorded Texas Historic Landmarks in Gray County
