= U.S. Route 60 in Texas =

Segment of American highway

U.S. Highway 60
- US 60 highlighted in red

Route information
- Maintained by TxDOT
- Length: 210.698 mi (339.086 km)
- Existed: June 8, 1931–present

Major junctions
- West end: US 60 in Farwell
- US 385 in Hereford; US 87 in Canyon; I-27 near Canyon; I-27 / I-40 / US 287 in Amarillo; US 87 / US 287 in Amarillo; US 83 in Canadian
- East end: US 60 / SH-51 near Higgins

Location
- Country: United States
- State: Texas
- Counties: Parmer, Castro, Deaf Smith, Randall, Potter, Carson, Gray, Roberts, Hemphill, Lipscomb

Highway system
- United States Numbered Highway System; List; Special; Divided; Highways in Texas; Interstate; US; State; Former; Toll; Loops; Spurs; FM/RM; Park; Rec
← SH 59	→ SH 60

U.S. Highway 60 (US 60) in Texas is a 210.70-mile-long (339.09 km) U.S. Highway that runs southwest to northeast through the Texas Panhandle. The route passes through the cities of Hereford, Canyon, Amarillo, and Canadian.

== Route description ==
US 60 enters Texas from New Mexico at Farwell, having just left a concurrency with US 70 and US 84 across the New Mexico state line in Texico. The route travels northeast through small towns in the western Panhandle, reaching an intersection with US 385 in Hereford. In Canyon, the highway turns north, merging with US 87 and then Interstate 27. The three routes run concurrently into Amarillo, where I-27 ends at an interchange with Interstate 40 and US 287. The freeway ends and splits into two one-way pairs of surface streets; westbound US 60 and northbound US 287 follow Buchanan Street, while eastbound US 60 and southbound US 87 follow Taylor Street. Upon reaching the north side of Amarillo, US 60 departs to the east on Amarillo Boulevard. This route is cosigned with Business I-40, and was part of the original route of US 66 through the city. US 60 and Business I-40 split just northeast of Rick Husband Amarillo International Airport, with US 60 continuing to the northeast. The route passes through Panhandle and Pampa, before beginning a 10-mile (16 km) concurrency with US 83 in Hemphill County. The two routes split north of Canadian, with US 60 travelling northeast to the Oklahoma state line near Higgins in Lipscomb County.

== History ==
The section of US 60 from New Mexico to Amarillo was originally a portion of the Ozark Trail and paralleled the Panhandle and Santa Fe Railway, part of the Atchison, Topeka and Santa Fe Railway. When Texas began numbering its highway system, the Ozark Trail received the number State Highway 13. By 1920, the entire US 60 route had been renumbered as State Highway 33, or its spur SH 33A, with the northeastern portion also following the AT&SF Railway. By the mid-1920s, the entire route had become an extension of the Abo Pass Highway, and was SH 33 along the entire length. In 1928, the AASHO added the highway to the U.S. Highway System as U.S. Highway 164, with the Texas section being signed in 1929. It was renumbered as US 60 on June 8, 1931, when the route was extended to Los Angeles, California, to make it a coast-to-coast highway.

== Major intersections ==
County	Location	mi	km	Destinations	Notes
Parmer	Farwell	0.000	0.000	US 60 west to US 84 – Clovis	Continuation into Texico, New Mexico
Parmer		0.845	1.360	FM 292 south	
Parmer		3.955	6.365	FM 2396 north	
Parmer		4.897	7.881	FM 3333 east	
Parmer		11.291– 11.467	18.171– 18.454	SH 86 east / FM 1381 north – Dimmitt	
Parmer	Bovina	12.653	20.363	FM 1731 south (3rd Street) / FM 2290 west	west end of FM 1731 overlap
Parmer	Bovina	13.048	20.999	FM 1731 north	east end of FM 1731 overlap
Parmer	Friona	24.473	39.385	SH 214 south – Muleshoe	west end of SH 214 overlap
Parmer	Friona	25.063	40.335	FM 2013 west	
Parmer	Friona	25.445	40.950	SH 214 north – Adrian	east end of SH 214 overlap; west end of SH 214 Bus. overlap
Parmer	Friona	25.783	41.494	Bus. SH 214 south	east end of SH 214 Bus. overlap
Parmer	Black	30.843	49.637	FM 3140 south	
Parmer	Black	33.212	53.450	FM 1172 south – Lazbuddie	
Castro	Summerfield	39.315	63.271	FM 1057	
Deaf Smith	Hereford	46.884	75.452	FM 2856 west	
Deaf Smith	Hereford	47.394	76.273	US 385 (25 Mile Avenue) – Vega, Dimmitt	
Deaf Smith	Hereford	47.901	77.089	FM 1259 east (Main Street)	
Deaf Smith	Hereford	43.830	70.538	Loop 211 west – Amarillo College	
Deaf Smith		50.787	81.734	FM 2943 south – Dimmitt	west end of FM 2943 overlap
Deaf Smith		52.072	83.802	FM 2943 north	east end of FM 2943 overlap
Deaf Smith	Dawn	60.591	97.512	FM 809 north – Wildorado	
Randall	Umbarger	67.099	107.985	FM 168 south – Nazareth, Buffalo Lake National Wildlife Refuge, Olton	west end of FM 168 overlap
Randall		67.644	108.862	FM 168 north	east end of FM 168 overlap
Randall		73.726– 73.957	118.650– 119.022	FM 1062 west	
Randall	Canyon	77.021	123.953	FM 2590 north (VFW Road) – Soncy	
Randall	Canyon	77.201	124.243	SH 217 east (11th Street) – Business District, Palo Duro Canyon State Park	
Randall	Canyon	77.223– 77.902	124.278– 125.371	15th Street	Interchange; west end of freeway
Randall	Canyon	77.956	125.458	US 87 south – Canyon, WTA&M	Eastbound exit and westbound left entrance
Randall	Canyon	78.228	125.896	Frontage Road	Eastbound exit only
Randall	Canyon	78.350	126.092	US 87 south (Texas Plains Trail) to SH 217 – Palo Duro Canyon State Park	West end of US 87 overlap; westbound left exit and eastbound left entrance
Randall	Canyon	78.463– 79.253	126.274– 127.545	FM 3331 (Hunsley Road)	
Randall	Canyon	79.606	128.113	To I-27 south / West Country Club Road	
Randall		80.965	130.301	I-27 south – Lubbock	West end of I-27 overlap; westbound left exit and eastbound left entrance; I-27 exit 110
see I-27
Potter	Amarillo	93.814– 94.287	150.979– 151.740	I-27 ends / US 287 south / I-40 – Albuquerque, Oklahoma City, Fort Worth	Current northern terminus of I-27; east end of I-27 overlap; west end of US 287 south overlap; I-27 exit 653B; I-40 exit 70
Potter	Amarillo	94.430	151.970	US 287 (Taylor Street)	One-way street, inbound access only; westbound entrance only; east end of US 287 south overlap
Potter	Amarillo	94.465	152.027	US 87 north (Filmore Street)	One-way street, outbound access only; eastbound exit only; east end of freeway; east end of US 87 north overlap (eastbound)
Potter	Amarillo	94.591	152.229	US 287	Eastbound entrance only; west end of US 287 north overlap; east end of freeway
Potter	Amarillo	94.800	152.566	Loop 395 (10th Avenue)	
Potter	Amarillo	95.091	153.034	Loop 279 west (6th Avenue)	Western terminus of Loop 279
Potter	Amarillo	96.101	154.660	I-40 BL west (Amarillo Boulevard west) / US 87 (Pierce Street)	Pierce St. is one-way street, inbound access only; east end of US 87 south overlap (westbound); west end of I-40 Bus. overlap; I-40 Bus. is former US 66 west
Potter	Amarillo	96.135	154.714	US 287 north (Buchanan Street north)	One-way street, outbound access only; east end of US 287 north overlap
Potter	Amarillo	98.228– 98.796	158.083– 158.997	Lake Street	Interchange
Potter	Amarillo	98.903	159.169	SH 136 north – Borger	
Potter	Amarillo	101.157– 101.219	162.796– 162.896	Loop 335 (Lakeside Road) – Airport	Interchange
Potter	Amarillo	104.376– 104.868	167.977– 168.769	Parsley Road – Amarillo College East Campus	Interchange
Potter	Amarillo	106.214– 106.878	170.935– 172.003	FM 1912	Interchange
Potter		107.131	172.411	I-40 BL east – Oklahoma City	East end of I-40 Bus. overlap; former US 66 east
Carson		108.675	174.895	FM 683 north – Texas Tech Research Farm	
Carson		112.952– 113.870	181.779– 183.256	FM 2373	Interchange
Carson		115.480	185.847	FM 2161 south	
Carson	Panhandle	123.036– 123.332	198.007– 198.484	SH 207 – Borger, Conway, Panhandle Business District	
Carson	Panhandle	123.282	198.403	FM 293 east	
Carson	Panhandle	124.224	199.919	FM Spur 293 south	
Carson	White Deer	136.696	219.991	FM 294 – Skellytown, Goodnight	
Carson		139.375	224.302	FM 2386 north	
Gray		145.160	233.612	FM 2300 south	
Gray	Pampa	148.325	238.706	FM 750 east	
Gray	Pampa	148.616	239.174	FM 282 (Price Road)	
Gray	Pampa	149.715	240.943	SH 70 / SH 152 west (Hobart Street) – Perryton, Borger, Clarendon	west end of SH 152 overlap; access to Pampa Regional Medical Center
Gray	Pampa	150.562	242.306	SH 273 south (Cuyler Street) – Lefors	
Gray	Pampa	152.838	245.969	Loop 171	
Gray		157.279– 157.478	253.116– 253.436	SH 152 east – Wheeler	east end of SH 152 overlap
Gray		158.225	254.638	FM 2391 – Hoover	
Roberts	Miami	173.011	278.434	FM 282 west / FM 748 south (Main Street) to SH 70 / FM 283 – Laketon	
Roberts		178.757	287.682	FM 3367 south	
Hemphill		188.678– 189.362	303.648– 304.749	US 83 south / SH 33 east – Wheeler, Watonga	Interchange; west end of US 83 overlap
Hemphill	Canadian	196.529	316.283	FM 2388 south (Main Street) – Court House	
Hemphill		198.466	319.400	FM 2266 east – Gene Howe Wildlife Management Area, Black Kettle National Grassland, Camp Kiowa	
Hemphill		198.668– 198.810	319.725– 319.954	US 83 north – Perryton, Liberal	east end of US 83 overlap
Hemphill		201.609– 201.742	324.458– 324.672	FM 1920 north to RM 3260	
Hemphill	Glazier	206.800	332.812	SH 305 north / RM 2758 east – Lipscomb	
Lipscomb	Higgins	222.229	357.643	SH 213 west / FM 1453 south – Lipscomb	
Lipscomb		223.794	360.162	US 60 east / SH-51 east – Arnett, Seiling, Enid	Continuation into Oklahoma
1.000 mi = 1.609 km; 1.000 km = 0.621 mi: Concurrency terminus; Incomplete access

U.S. Route 60
Previous state: New Mexico	Texas	Next state: Oklahoma
