= Texas State Highway 217 =

State highway in Texas

State Highway 217
- SH 217; highlighted in red

Route information
- Maintained by TxDOT
- Length: 13.587 mi (21.866 km)
- Existed: 1935–present

Major junctions
- West end: US 60 in Canyon
- US 87 in Canyon; I-27 in Canyon
- East end: PR 5 in Palo Duro Canyon State Park

Location
- Country: United States
- State: Texas

Highway system
- Highways in Texas; Interstate; US; State; Former; Toll; Loops; Spurs; FM/RM; Park; Rec
← SH 216	→ SH 218

State Highway 217 (SH 217) is a Texas state highway running from Canyon east to the Palo Duro Canyon State Park where it becomes Texas Park Road 5. The route was designated on May 29, 1935.

== Junction list ==
The entire route is in Randall County.

Location	mi	km	Destinations	Notes
Canyon			US 60	
Canyon			US 87	
Canyon			Loop 48	
Canyon			I-27	I-27 exit 106.
			FM 1541	FM 1541 Spur
			FM 1541	
			PR 5	
1.000 mi = 1.609 km; 1.000 km = 0.621 mi
