= U.S. Route 66 in Texas =

Historic highway in Texas

U.S. Highway 66
- Will Rogers Highway
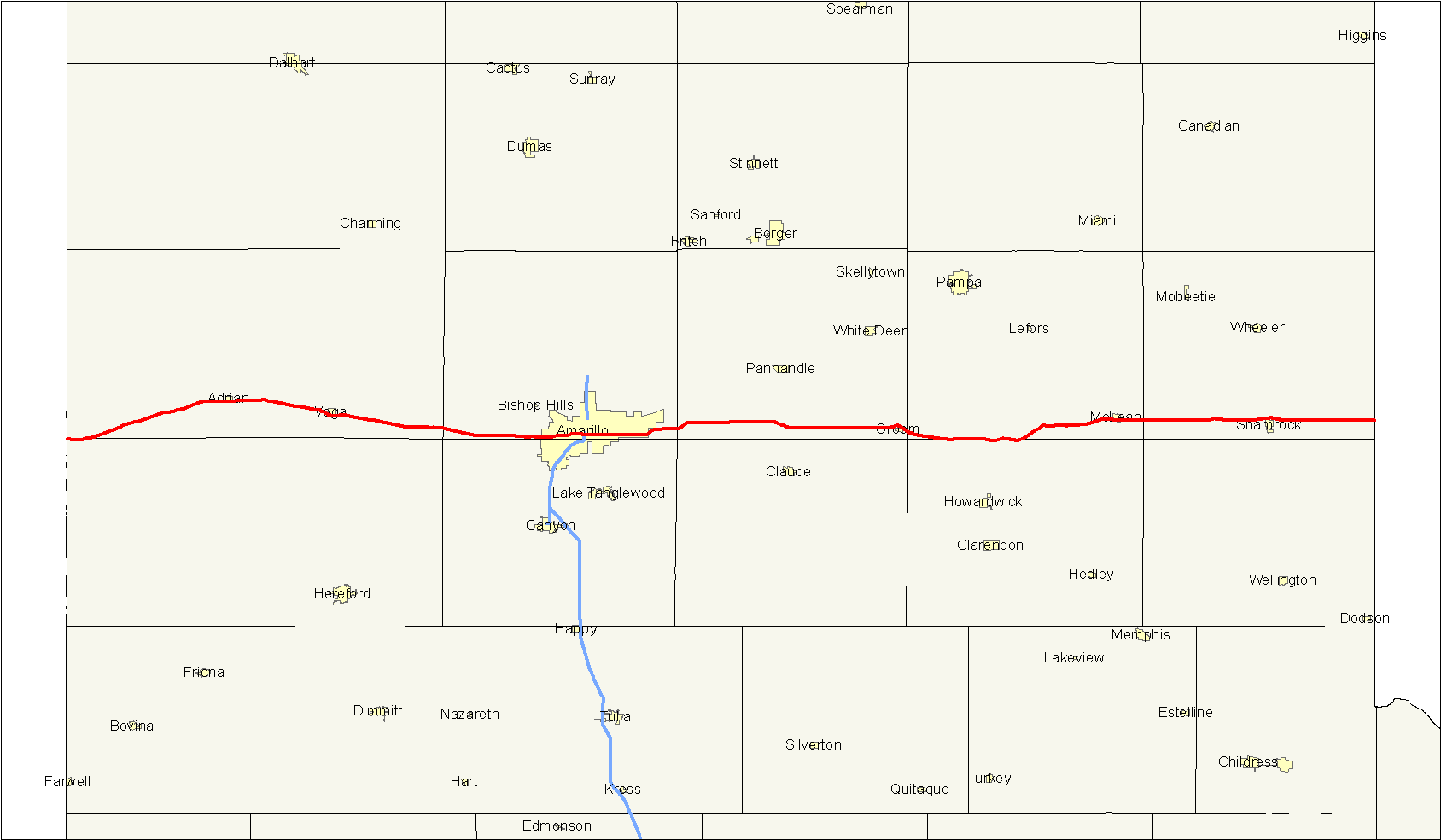

Route information
- Maintained by TxDOT
- Length: 179 mi (288 km)
- Existed: November 11, 1926–June 26, 1985

Major junctions
- West end: US 66 at the New Mexico state line in Glenrio
- US 385 in Vega; US 60 / US 87 / US 287 Amarillo; US 83 in Shamrock
- East end: US 66 at the Oklahoma state line near Texola

Location
- Country: United States
- State: Texas
- Counties: Deaf Smith, Oldham, Potter, Carson, Gray, Donley, Wheeler

Highway system
- United States Numbered Highway System; List; Special; Divided; Highways in Texas; Interstate; US; State; Former; Toll; Loops; Spurs; FM/RM; Park; Rec
← SH 65	→ SH 66

U.S. Route 66 (US 66, Route 66) in the state of Texas extended across the Texas Panhandle from its designation in 1926 to its decommissioning in 1985. From the New Mexico state line in Glenrio to Amarillo in Potter County, US 66 was directly located along the historic Ozark Trail, an auto trail that stretched from St. Louis, Missouri to Las Vegas, New Mexico.

== Route description ==
The original US 66 followed an east–west line across the Texas Panhandle from Glenrio to Texola, Oklahoma. When Interstate 40 (I-40) was constructed most of the highway was upgraded in place, reducing construction costs and keeping existing towns close to the new highway to minimize tourism losses. Bypassed towns included Glenrio, Adrian, Vega, Conway, Groom, Jericho, Alanreed, McLean, and Shamrock; US 66 in each is retained as a business loop or spur of I-40. Outside of the towns, US 66 is typically retained as a frontage road for I-40.

Route 66 originally crossed from New Mexico into Texas at Glenrio, an unincorporated community founded in 1903 as a Rock Island Railroad siding. During Route 66's heyday, Glenrio's cafés, filling stations and businesses such as the First/Last Motel in Texas served travellers on the highway; after the road was bypassed in 1973, Glenrio became a ghost town.

Adrian (pop. 149) bills itself as the geographic "Midpoint of Route 66". Flo of Flo's V-8 Diner in Pixar's Cars is based on Fran Houser (who owned the Midpoint Café but has since semi-retired); the Mia and Tia characters are based on two sisters at the Midpoint Café. In Vega, Texas, the 1947 Vega Motel remains in operation as a historic motel.

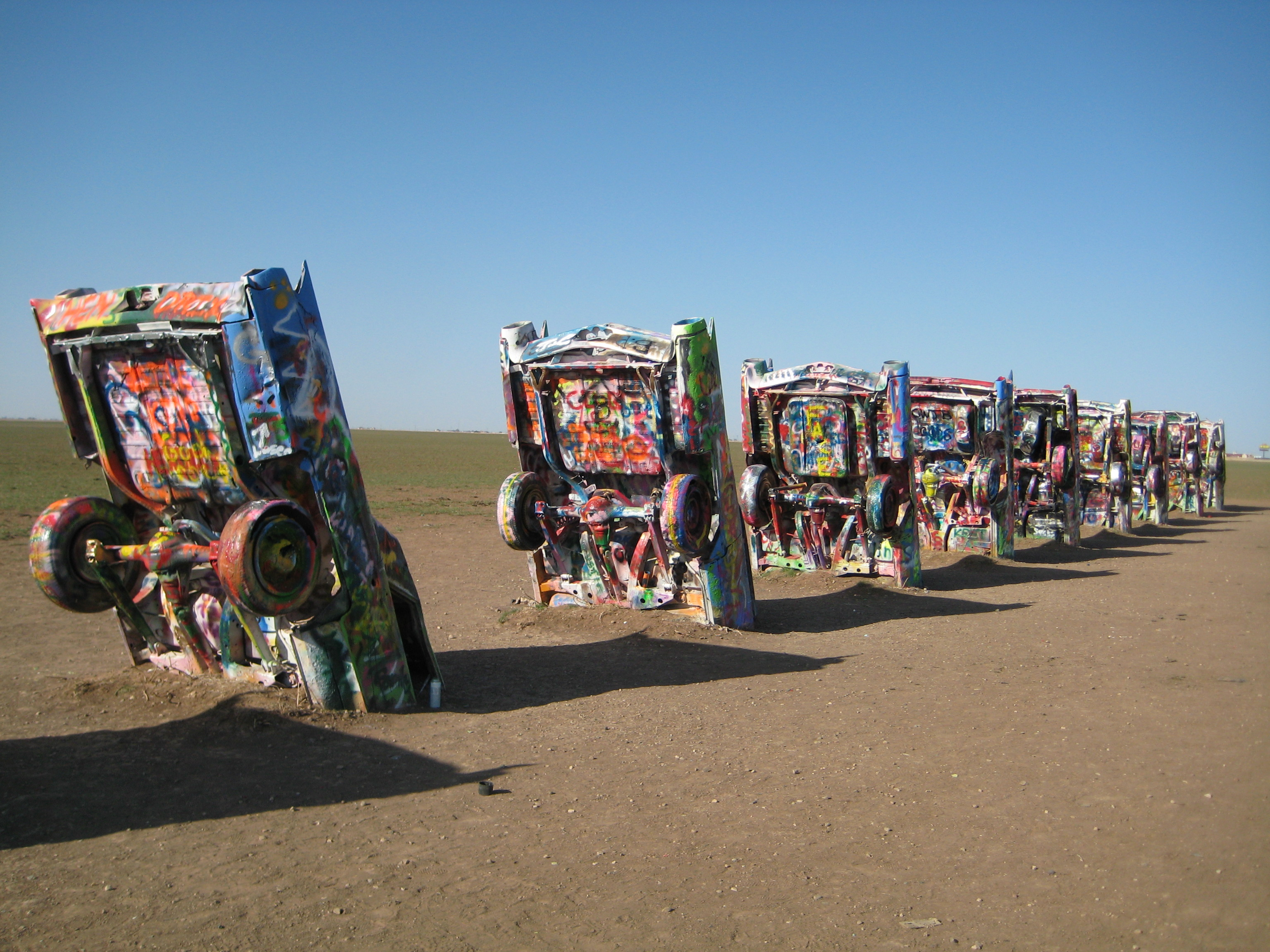
Cadillac Ranch in Amarillo

Amarillo is the only major city on the Texas portion of US 66; its 6th Street Historic District includes a dozen buildings incorporating elements of Spanish Revival, Art Deco, and Art Moderne design including homes, service stations, a historic fire hall and a church. The Cadillac Ranch inspired the Cadillac Range mountains in Cars while the Tex Dinoco character adopts the appearance of the stretched, longhorn Cadillac vehicles at Amarillo's Big Texan Steak Ranch. The Ranchotel, a tourist court built in 1940 and designed architecturally to resemble a Texas ranch, was one of sixty-eight Route 66 lodgings operating in Amarillo by 1953. The building still stands in good condition but is now used as apartments. Eastbound alignments out of Amarillo include one that parallels I-40 (where one can find the Steak Ranch), while another is along I-40 business, multiplexed with US Route 60 for several miles out of town. The original alignment was probably along 8th Avenue, but that alignment has been interrupted by Amarillo International Airport.

In Conway a portion of Route 66 from State Highway 207 (SH 207) to I-40 is listed on the National Register of Historic Places. Conway is home to The Bug Farm (with five VW Beetles buried nose down) and a trading post; the Triangle Motel is as of 2012 being restored after years of resting closed, neglected and abandoned.

In Groom, Texas a leaning water tower stands empty, originally placed as an advertisement for a truck stop which burned years ago. A large crucifix serves as a local landmark. In McLean the McLean Commercial Historic District includes one of the first Phillips Petroleum stations in Texas (1929, now restored). Also in McLean is the Devils Rope Barbed Wire Museum, the Avalon Theatre and the Cactus Inn Motel.

Shamrock has restored the Tower Station and U-Drop Inn Café as a visitor centre; the Tower Station's distinctive architecture appears as Ramone's body shop in Cars. A Pioneer West Museum on two floors of the former Reynolds Hotel highlights a diversity of West Texas exhibits and the Route 66 Bridge over the Chicago, Rock Island and Gulf Railroad is listed on the National Register of Historic Places.

== History ==
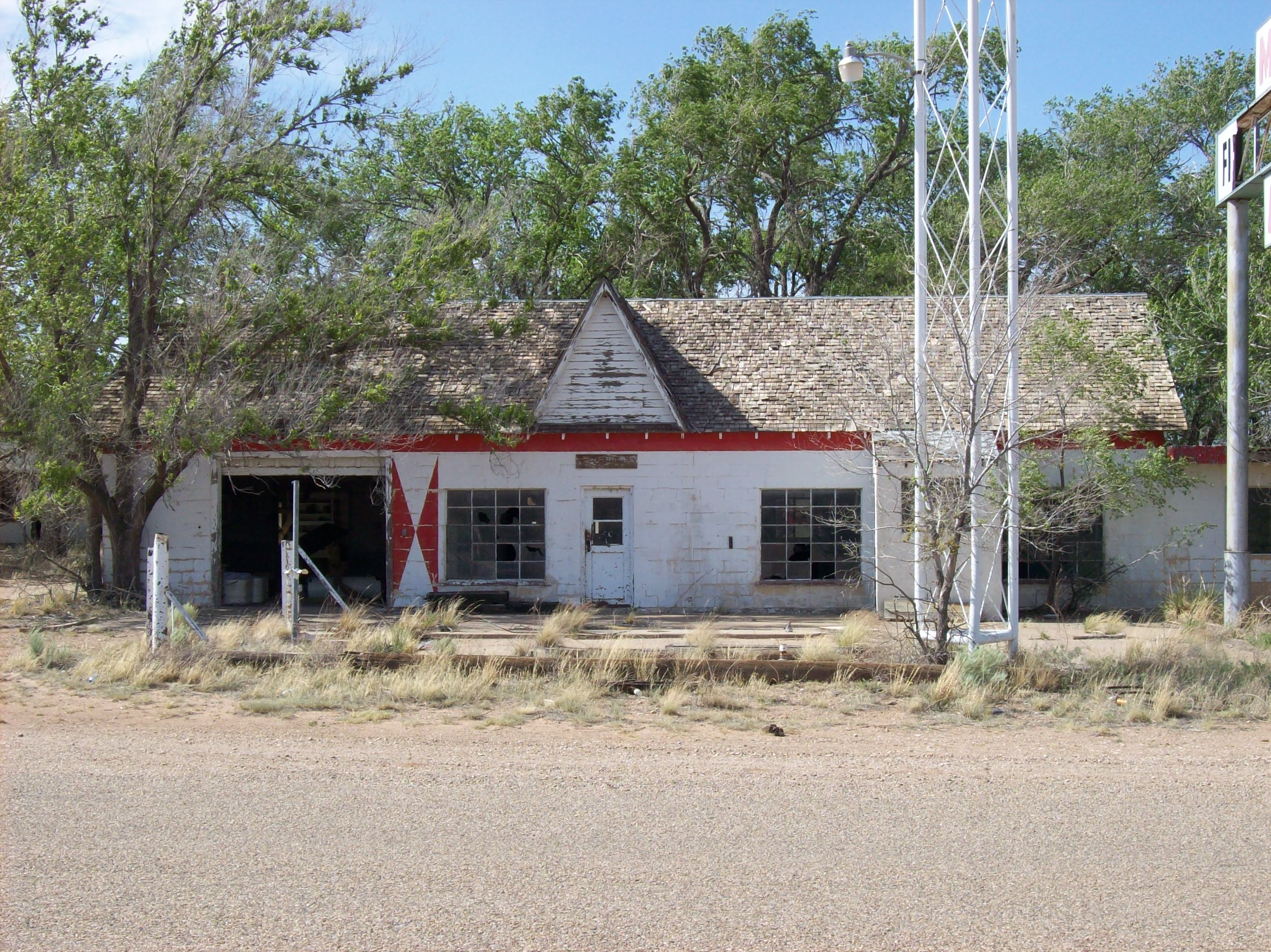
First/Last Motel in Texas, Glenrio

Before the U.S. Route system, this route was a system of interconnected highways from New Mexico to Oklahoma, considered a part of the Texas highway system from New Mexico to Amarillo and a portion of the Ozark Trails. In Amarillo, the Ozark route split off to a more southerly route, while general low-grade roads continued east. This entire route closely paralleled the Chicago, Rock Island and Pacific Railway. Most construction through the Panhandle was slow, and remained low-grade roads through most of the 1920s.

In 1926, the United States Numbered Highway system was introduced, and the route across the Texas Panhandle was given the number of 66. It was designated along already created roads in the Texas highway network. Large portions of the highway remained earthen roads until the entire route was completely paved in 1938. A few realignments were made to the original route. A new routing on the east side of Amarillo was completed in 1959 to make way for the expansion of the Amarillo Air Force Base, while the rest of the route through Amarillo was rebuilt on the north side of downtown.

== Major intersections ==
County	Location	mi	km	Destinations	Notes
Deaf Smith	Glenrio	0.0	0.0	US 66 west – Albuquerque	New Mexico state line
Oldham				FM 2858 south	
Oldham	Adrian	23	37	SH 214 south	
Oldham	Vega	36	58	US 385 – Channing, Hereford	
Oldham	Wildorado	50	80	FM 809 south	
Potter	Bushland	53	85	RM 2381 north	
Potter	Amarillo			Loop 335 south	
Potter	Amarillo			Bus. US 66 east (9th Avenue)	
Potter	Amarillo			RM 1061 north	
Potter	Amarillo			FM 1719 (Western Street)	
Potter	Amarillo	72	116	US 60 west / US 87 / US 287 / Bus. US 66 west (Fillmore Street) – Dumas, Pampa, Canyon, Lubbock, Fort Worth	Western end of US 60 overlap
Potter	Amarillo			SH 136 north – Fritch, Borger	
Potter	Amarillo			Loop 335	
Potter				FM 1912	
Potter				US 60 east – Panhandle	Eastern end of US 60 overlap
Carson				FM 2575 west	
Carson				FM 2161 north	
Carson	Conway			SH 207 north – Panhandle	Western end of SH 207 overlap
Carson				SH 207 south – Claude	Eastern end of SH 207 overlap
Carson	Lark			FM 2880 north	
Carson				FM 294	
Carson	Groom	114	183	FM 295 north	
Carson	Groom			FM 2300 north	
Gray				SH 70 north – Pampa	Western end of SH 70 overlap
Donley				SH 70 south – Clarendon	Eastern end of SH 70 overlap
Gray				Loop 271 east	
Gray	Alanreed			FM 291	
Gray				Loop 271 west to FM 291 south	
Gray	McLean	144	232	SH 273 – Lefors, Pampa, Shamrock, Hedley	
Gray	McLean			FM 3143 south	
Wheeler				FM 1443 north	
Wheeler				FM 453 north	
Wheeler	Lela			FM 1547	
Wheeler				FM 2474 north	
Wheeler	Shamrock	163	262	US 83 – Wheeler, Wellington	
Wheeler				FM 2168 north	
Wheeler				FM 1802 south	
Wheeler		179	288	US 66 east – Oklahoma City	Oklahoma state line
1.000 mi = 1.609 km; 1.000 km = 0.621 mi

== Structures ==
=== Historic districts ===
Glenrio, formerly Rock Island, is an unincorporated community in both Deaf Smith County, Texas and Quay County, New Mexico. The ghost town sits on the Texas–New Mexico state line. It includes the Glenrio Historic District, which was listed on the National Register of Historic Places in 2007. Glenrio has one active business, a cannabis dispensary, located on the New Mexico side, where recreational cannabis sale and usage is legal.

The McLean Commercial District, consisting of most of the downtown area of McLean, was listed in the historical register on December 20, 2006.

=== Restaurants ===
The Big Texan Steak Ranch & Brewery was established by R. J. "Bob" Lee and was opened on Route 66 in 1960. He commissioned a towering, illuminated sign that featured a cowboy with hat pushed back on his head. The restaurant was designed to capture the romanticized feel of the Old West and provide unique ambiance for people enjoying a steak dinner.

The English Field House is a Mexican restaurant east of Amarillo. It was opened in 1929 as alongside English Field (known today as the Rick Husband Amarillo International Airport) by Harold English.

U.S. Route 66
Previous state: New Mexico	Texas	Next state: Oklahoma
