= Black, Texas =

- Unincorporated community
- Location within the state of Texas Black (the United States)
- Coordinates: 34°40′56.4″N 102°36′34.4″W 34.682451, -102.609464
- Country: United States
- State: Texas
- County: Parmer
- Elevation: 3,802 ft (1,159 m)
- Time zone: UTC-6 (Central (CST))
  - Summer (DST): UTC-5 (CDT)
- ZIP codes: 79035

Black is an unincorporated community in northeastern Parmer County, Texas, United States. It lies on U.S. Route 60. The settlement was originally established in 1898 as a station on the Pecos Valley and Northern Texas Railway and is named for E. B. Black, who purchased a large tract of farmland in 1901. In 1908, much of the former XIT Ranch's land came up on market, and many buyers arrived at the Black station on special trains operated by the Wright Land Company. In 1910, a school was opened and a post office was established in 1912. The post office was closed in 1914, reopened shortly after then closed again in 1920. It was reestablished once more in 1926.

In 1950, the Black school district was consolidated with the schools of Friona. The town is noted for hosting a large community Thanksgiving dinner every year. In 1980, the town contained four businesses and in 1990 it had a population of 100. The population remained the same in 2000; however, twelve businesses were reported active. Large grain elevators dominate the town and are one of the largest employers in the area.
