= Arizona State Route 99 =

State highway in Navajo and Coconino counties in Arizona, United States

State Route 99
- SR 99 highlighted in red

Route information
- Maintained by ADOT
- Length: 44.31 mi (71.31 km)
- Existed: 1970–present

Major junctions
- South end: South of Winslow, road continues as Apache-Sitgreaves National Forest service road 34
- I-40 in Winslow
- North end: BIA Route 15 in Leupp

Location
- Country: United States
- State: Arizona

Highway system
- Arizona State Highway System; Interstate; US; State; Scenic Proposed; Former
← SR 98	→ Loop 101

State Route 99 (SR 99) is a 44.31-mile (71.31 km) state highway in Coconino and Navajo counties in Arizona, United States, that connects Forest Service Road 34 (east of Blue Ridge) with BIA Route 15 in Leupp.

== Route description ==
SR 99 starts in Leupp on the Navajo Nation and heads south to Interstate 40 west of Winslow. From there, the route runs concurrently with I-40, then exiting I-40 in Winslow onto Business Spur 40. In downtown Winslow, SR 99 heads south on SR 87 before separating from it outside of the city. The route heads towards the edge of the Apache Forest, where state maintenance ends.

== History ==
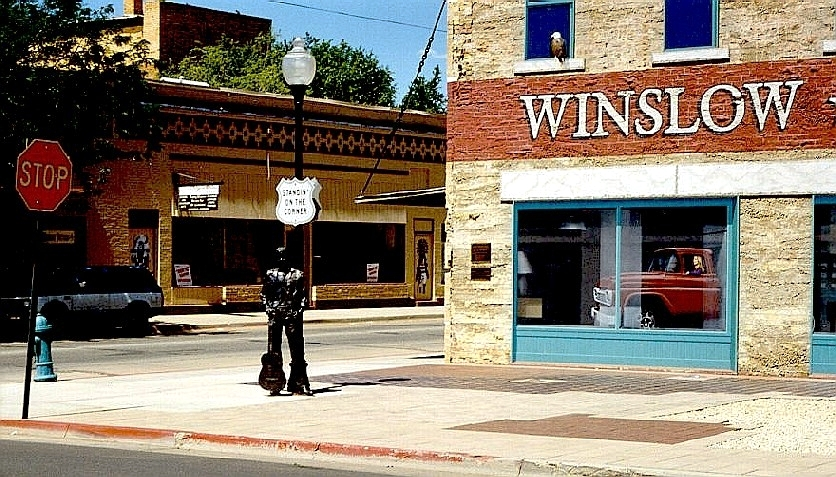
The "standin' on the corner" statue and mural in downtown Winslow commemorates the Eagles' song "Take It Easy". The southbound corridor of State Route 99 (West 2nd Street) is visible in the background.

The route was defined by the Arizona Department of Transportation in 1968 as State Route 99. A designation of the nearby State Route 377 was deleted in 1983 and added to SR 99. Since then, there have not been any major realignments of the route.

== Major intersections ==
County	Location	mi	km	Destinations	Notes
Navajo		0.00	0.00	FH 34 south (Wallace Road) – SR 260	Continuation south beyond southern terminus
Navajo		15.01	24.16	SR 87 south – Clints Well, Payson, Mesa	Southern end of SR 87 concurrency
Navajo	Winslow	16.30	26.23	Historic US 66 east / SR 87 north (2nd Street) – Joseph City, Holbrook, Second Mesa, Albuquerque (New Mexico)	One-way street; outbound access only;; former BL 40 east
Navajo	Winslow	16.30	26.23	Historic US 66 east / SR 87 north (3rd Street) – Rest Area, Flagstaff	One-way street; inbound access only; northern end of SR 87 concurrency; former BL 40
Navajo	Winslow			BS 40 west (3rd Street west)	Southern end of BS 40 concurrency
Navajo	Winslow	18.25	29.37	Hipkoe Dr north I-40 east (Purple Heart Trail) / BS 40 ends / US 180 east – Albuquerque (New Mexico)	Diamond interchange; I-40 exit 252; northern end of BS 40 concurrency; southern end of I-40 / US 180 concurrency concurrency
Coconino		24.94	40.14	I-40 west (Purple Heart Trail) / US 180 west – Rest Area, Meteor Crater Rd, Flagstaff	Diamond interchange; I-40 exit 245 northern end of I-40 / US 180 concurrency
Coconino	Leupp	44.31	71.31	BIA Route 15 east – Dilkon BIA Route 15 west (Leupp Rd) – Flagstaff	Northern terminus
Coconino	Leupp	44.31	71.31	BIA Route 604 north	Continuation north from northern terminus
1.000 mi = 1.609 km; 1.000 km = 0.621 mi: Concurrency terminus; Route transition

== See also ==
- List of state highways in Arizona
