= Farm to Market Road 1719 =

Road in Texas, United States

Farm to Market Road 1719

Route information
- Maintained by TxDOT
- Length: 10.0 mi (16.1 km)
- Existed: 1951–present

Major junctions
- South end: I-40 BL in Amarillo
- Loop 335; FM 2176
- North end: US 87 / US 287

Location
- Country: United States
- State: Texas
- Counties: Potter

Highway system
- Highways in Texas; Interstate; US; State; Former; Toll; Loops; Spurs; FM/RM; Park; Rec
← FM 1718	→ FM 1720

Farm to Market Road 1719 (FM 1719) is a farm to market road in the Amarillo metropolitan area of the Texas Panhandle.

== Route description ==
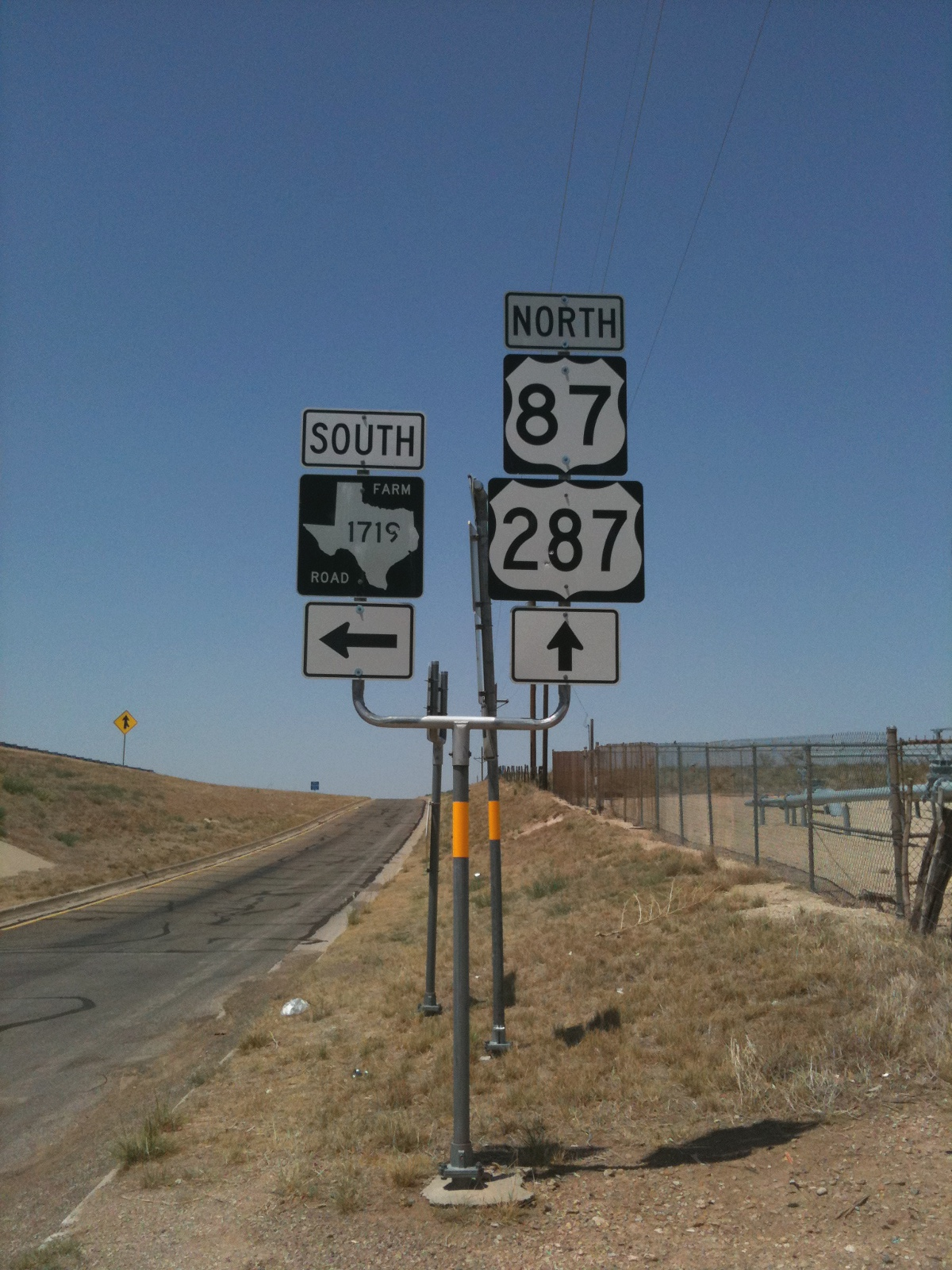
Signage at the northern terminus of FM 1719.

FM 1719 begins at BL I-40 (Amarillo Boulevard) and travels northward along Western Street. Along this segment, the roadway is four-laned with a center turn lane until the intersection at NW 24th Avenue. After leaving the city limits, the route intersects Loop 335 and becomes a two-lane roadway. It continues northward before turning to the east along Givens Avenue. The route intersects FM 2176 before ending at the US 87/US 287 freeway.

== History ==
A previous route numbered FM 1719 was designated in Kendall County on May 23, 1951, from US 87 to the Bandera County line. That route was cancelled on July 18, 1951, becoming part of RM 475 (later SH 46).

The current FM 1719 was also designated on May 23, 1951. Given that two roads were designated FM 1719 that day, it is likely that one of them was supposed to be numbered FM 819. FM 1719 ran approximately 5.8 miles (9.3 km) from the then-proposed US 66 (the present-day I-40 business route) to the north before doglegging eastward to what was then US 87. When US 87 (and then US 287) were rerouted to the new Dumas Highway on June 21, 1977, the segment of FM 1719 from the new freeway to the old alignment (now designated Loop 434) was transferred to Loop 335, which had been designated around the southern and western sides of Amarillo that year. When Loop 335 became a full loop on April 18, 1985, the dogleg eastward was transferred to that route, reducing the mileage of FM 1719 to approximately 2.9 miles (4.7 km).

On June 27, 1995, TxDOT internally redesignated FM 1719 as Urban Road 1719 (UR 1719). The designation reverted to FM 1719 with the elimination of the Urban Road system on November 15, 2018.

In 1999, the Texas Transportation Commission allocated $3.9 million for the addition of shoulders to Western Street north of Loop 335, with the goal of adding that segment to FM 1719. The route reached its current length on March 31, 2005, when that northward extension and an eastward segment (which usurped a segment of FM 2176) were added, once again connecting FM 1719 with the Dumas Highway. The improvements related to this extension were completed in 2008 at a cost of approximately $360,000.

== Major intersections ==
The entire highway is in Potter County.

Location	mi	km	Destinations	Notes
Amarillo	0.0	0.0	I-40 BL (Amarillo Blvd.)	Southern terminus; continues as Western St.
	2.8	4.5	Loop 335 (St. Francis Ave.)	
	7.1	11.4	Givens Ave.	FM 1719 turns from Western St. onto Givens Ave.
	9.2	14.8	FM 2176 (Broadway Dr.)	
	10.0	16.1	US 87 / US 287 – Dumas, Amarillo	Northern terminus
1.000 mi = 1.609 km; 1.000 km = 0.621 mi
