= National Register of Historic Places listings in Deaf Smith County, Texas =

Location of Deaf Smith County in Texas

This is a list of the National Register of Historic Places listings in Deaf Smith County, Texas.

This is intended to be a complete list of properties and districts listed on the National Register of Historic Places in Deaf Smith County, Texas. There are one district and one individual property listed on the National Register in the county. The individual property is both a State Antiquities Landmark and a Recorded Texas Historic Landmark.

This National Park Service list is complete through NPS recent listings posted March 21, 2025.

== Current listings ==
The locations of National Register properties and districts may be seen in a mapping service provided.

	Name on the Register	Image	Date listed	Location	City or town	Description
1	E. B. Black House	E. B. Black House	July 17, 1978 (#78002923)	508 W. 3rd St. 34°48′52″N 102°24′17″W	Hereford	State Antiquities Landmark, Recorded Texas Historic Landmark; houses Deaf Smith County Historical Museum
2	Glenrio Historic District	Glenrio Historic District	January 17, 2007 (#06001258)	Loop 504; 35°10′44″N 103°02′32″W	Glenrio	Extends into Quay County, New Mexico

== See also ==
- National Register of Historic Places listings in Texas
- Recorded Texas Historic Landmarks in Deaf Smith County
