= Texas State Highway Loop 335 =

Beltway around Amarillo, Texas

State Highway Loop 335

Route information
- Maintained by TxDOT
- Length: 39.967 mi (64.321 km)
- Existed: January 18, 1960–present

Major junctions
- Beltway around Amarillo
- I-40 / US 287 near Amarillo Int'l Airport; I-40 BL / US 60; Future I-27 / US 87 / US 287; I-40 BL; I-40

Location
- Country: United States
- State: Texas

Highway system
- Highways in Texas; Interstate; US; State; Former; Toll; Loops; Spurs; FM/RM; Park; Rec
| ← Spur 334 | → Loop 336 |

Loop 335 is a highway loop that encircles the city of Amarillo, Texas, United States. Loop 335 connects to every major highway in the city and passes close to Amarillo International Airport on the east side of the city. Loop 335 is not currently a continuous freeway. Instead, the highway has interchanges at select junctions and short segments of freeway such as its southeastern section.

== Route description ==
Loop 335 makes a complete loop around the city of Amarillo. The highway passes in and out of the city and, as of January 2024, skirts most development.

=== Naming ===
Loop 335 has several local names:

- The southern leg is known as Hollywood Road.
- The eastern leg is known as Lakeside Drive.
- The northern leg is known as St. Francis Avenue from SH 136 to Soncy Road.
- The western leg is currently known as Soncy Road. However, once the rerouting via Helium Road, described below, is complete, the name is expected to change.

=== Lane configuration ===
Because I-40 runs east–west and I-27/U.S. Route 87 run mostly north–south through Amarillo, Loop 335 can be divided into four sections: northeastern, southeastern, southwestern, and northwestern. The two junctions with I-40, the junction with I-27, and the junction with US 87/US 287 are all grade-separated. Additional grade separations are listed below.

- The northeastern section is a 5-lane road (2 lanes in each direction with a center left-turn lane). It becomes a 4-lane divided road east of Glenn Street until it reaches SH 136 where it resumes as a 5-lane road. South of US 60 is when Loop 335 becomes a 4-lane non-divided freeway with frontage roads. The frontage roads currently end at Barnco Road. There are 7 road grade separations, 3 rail grade separations, and an unspecified bridge.
- The southeastern section is a 4-lane divided road for a short distance. It becomes 2 lanes before it reaches 34th Street (currently an at-grade intersection). There are 2 road grade separations and 1 rail grade separation. As of 2016, this section was being upgraded to a 4-lane divided freeway with frontage roads.
- The southwestern section is a 4-lane divided road but then becomes a 7-lane road (3 lanes in each direction with a center left-turn lane) at Arden Road. This section has additional right turn lanes. There are currently no grade separations of any kind. There are many roads nearby but no rivers nor rails near this section. There are numerous businesses along the 7-lane portion of the route. The current plan is to separate Loop 335 from Soncy Road by building a completely new expressway with frontage roads in this section, bypassing Soncy Road.
- The northwestern section reduces to a 5-lane road (2 lanes in each direction with a center left-turn lane.) North of Amarillo Boulevard, Loop 335 becomes a 4-lane divided road. At SW 9th Avenue (currently an at-grade intersection), Loop 335 becomes a 2-lane road. The route becomes 4-lane divided again at North Western Street. There are 4 road grade separations and 1 rail grade separation.

== History ==
Loop 335 was designated on January 18, 1960, from US 60 and US 87 south of Amarillo eastward and northward to US 287.

On January 31, 1961, Loop 335 was extended northward and westward to US 87 and US 287.

On July 30, 1965, Loop 335 was extended westward and northward from US 60 and US 87 to US 66.

On June 21, 1977, a section of FM 1719 from Loop 434 to the new location of US 87 and US 287 was transferred to Loop 335.

On July 24, 1984, Loop 335 was extended west and south to the point of beginning, completing its current route, and also replacing another section of FM 1719.

On April 26, 2018, Loop 335 was rerouted from a point 1/2 mile (0.80 km) south of SW 9th Avenue, to Interstate 40, to Helium Road, to Farm to Market Road 2186, and back to existing Loop 335. The old route, a section of Soncy Road, was transferred to FM 2590. However, this will not be effective until construction on this portion is completed.

== Future ==
In 2015, the Texas Department of Transportation (TxDOT) published the plans for the all new Loop 335 freeway that encircles the city of Amarillo. TxDOT has planned multiple multi-level interchanges that junction with Interstate 40, Interstate 27, US 287 and US 87. The first interchange, on the east side of Amarillo, is a multi-level interchange that provides access to both directions of the I-40 freeway and Loop 335. The second interchange with I-40, however, is a full stack interchange. On the northern side of Amarillo, the loop will be completely reconstructed to an Interstate-grade freeway with complete grade separations and will be expanded to 4 lanes. It also includes a stack interchange that will connect the new freeway to the future I-27 Ports-to-Plains Corridor (US 287, US 87). I-27 in southern Amarillo will be entirely reconstructed from the Country Club Road interchange to Palo Duro Canyon State Park. It will accommodate 6 lanes at the mainlane bridge along with a complete stack interchange with direct connectors to and from I-27. Furthermore, another triple-level interchange will be built to accommodate Soncy Road, Helium Road, I-27 and the new loop. Also, another new mainlane bridge that accommodates up to 6 lanes is also in the works for I-40 near Helium Road, providing easier access to the new freeway. Although construction started in 2016, the entire project (which includes converting the entire loop to Interstate specifications) is not expected to be complete until 2024. The southwest portion of the new freeway opened in June 2024. The original SL 335 was moved off Soncy Road.

== Junction list ==
Junctions are listed in CCW order. All interchange exits are unnumbered.

| County | Location | mi | km | Destinations | Notes |
|---|---|---|---|---|---|
| Randall | Amarillo | 0.0 | 0.0 | I-27 / US 60 / US 87 – Amarillo, Canyon, Palo Duro Canyon State Park | I-27 exit 116. |
| Randall | Amarillo | 0.4 | 0.64 | Bell Street | Interchange; clockwise end of freeway |
| Randall | Amarillo | 1.5 | 2.4 | Western Street | |
| Randall | Amarillo | 2.5 | 4.0 | Georgia Street | |
| Randall | Amarillo | 3.5 | 5.6 | FM 1541 (Washington Street) | Interchange; counterclockwise end of freeway |
| Randall | | 5.5 | 8.9 | Osage Street | Interchange |
| Potter | Amarillo | 13.7 | 22.0 | I-40 / US 287 – Albuquerque, Oklahoma City, Fort Worth, Airport | I-40 exit 75. |
| Potter | Amarillo | 14.2 | 22.9 | East 3rd Avenue – Airport | Interchange |
| Potter | Amarillo | 15.9 | 25.6 | US 60 / I-40 BL (Amarillo Boulevard) | Interchange |
| Potter | | 16.7 | 26.9 | Spur 591 (NE 24th Avenue) | Interchange |
| Potter | Amarillo | 18.3 | 29.5 | SH 136 to FM 1912 – Borger | Interchange |
| Potter | | 20.5 | 33.0 | Eastern Street | Interchange |
| Potter | Amarillo | 23.5 | 37.8 | Loop 434 (River Road) | |
| Potter | Amarillo | 23.7 | 38.1 | Future I-27 / US 87 / US 287 | Interchange |
| Potter | Amarillo | 24.5 | 39.4 | FM 2176 (Broadway Drive) | Interchange |
| Potter | | 26.5 | 42.6 | FM 1719 (Western Street) | Interchange |
| Potter | | 27.8 | 44.7 | Hester Road | Interchange |
| Potter | Amarillo | 29.7 | 47.8 | RM 1061 (Tascosa Road) | Interchange |
| Potter | Amarillo | 33.4 | 53.8 | I-40 BL (West Amarillo Boulevard) | |
| Potter | Amarillo | 33.7 | 54.2 | I-40 | I-40 exit 64. |
| Randall | Amarillo | 37.7 | 60.7 | FM 2186 (West Hollywood Road) | |
| Randall | Amarillo | 38.6 | 62.1 | FM 2590 | Interchange |
| Randall | Amarillo | 39.6 | 63.7 | Coulter Street | Interchange |
1.000 mi = 1.609 km; 1.000 km = 0.621 mi
