= Glenrio, New Mexico and Texas =

Glenrio, New Mexico Glenrio, Texas
- Unincorporated community
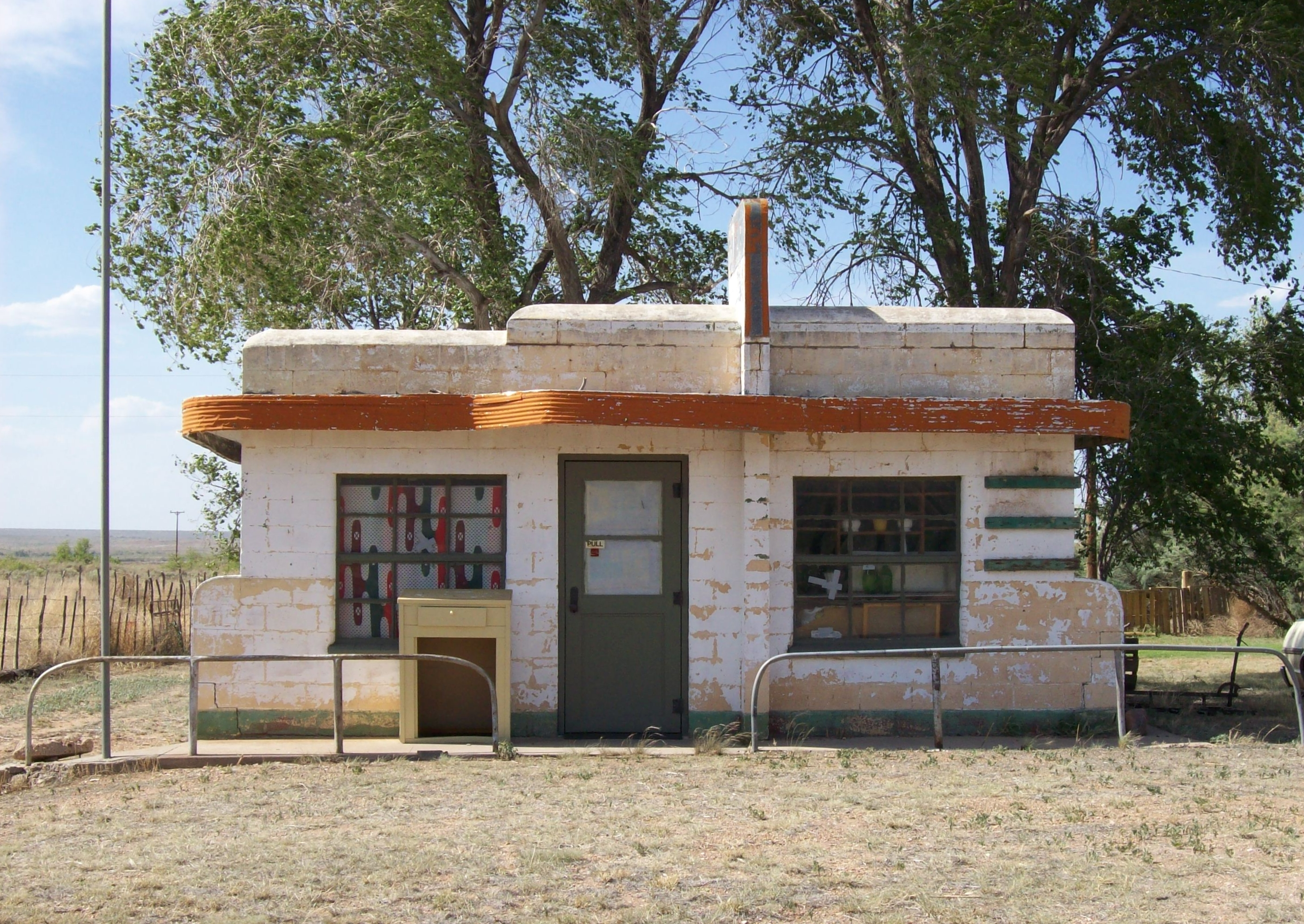
- Closed café in Glenrio

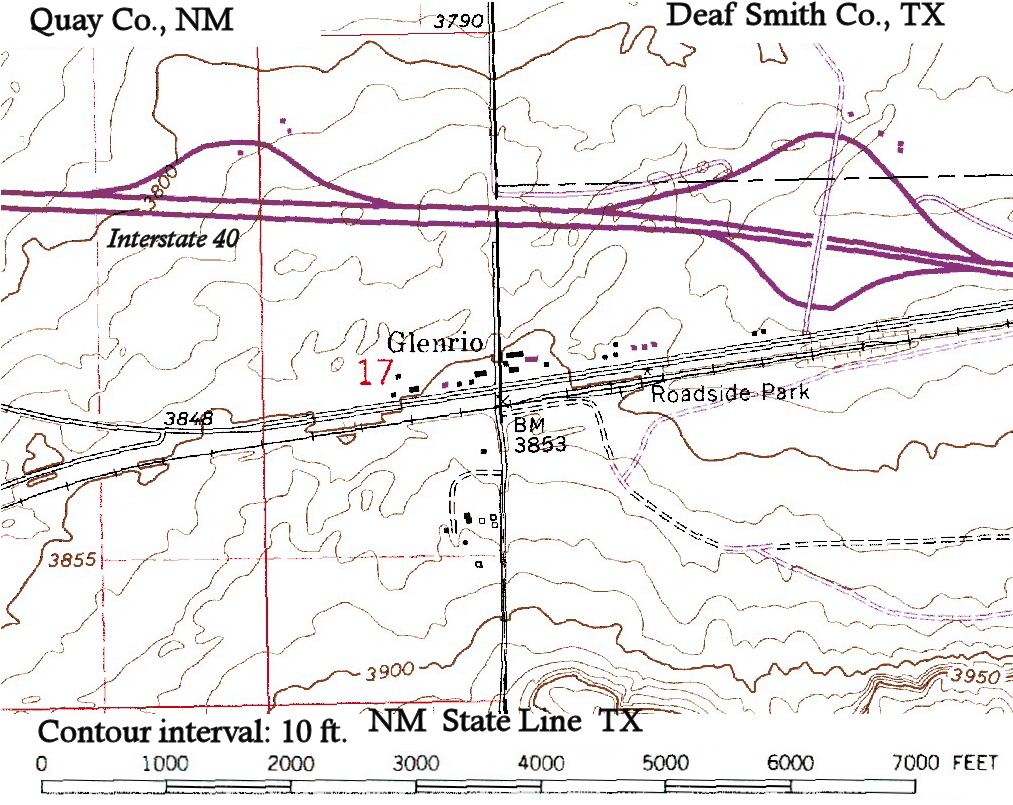
- Topographic map of Glenrio, 1982
- Country: United States
- States: New Mexico; Texas
- Counties: Quay County, New Mexico; Deaf Smith County, Texas
- Elevation: 3,855 ft (1,175 m)

Population (2010)
  - Total: 0
- ZIP Code: 88434
- GNIS feature ID: 915829
- Glenrio Historic District
- U.S. National Register of Historic Places
- U.S. Historic district
- NM State Register of Cultural Properties
- Location within New Mexico Location within Texas Location within the United States
- Location: Texas State Highway Loop 504 / New Mexico State Road 1578, Glenrio
- Coordinates: 35°10′44″N 103°02′32″W
- Area: 31.7 acres (12.8 ha)
- Built: 1926
- Architectural style: Bungalow/Craftsman, Moderne
- MPS: Route 66 through New Mexico MPS, Route 66 in Texas MPS
- NRHP reference No.: 06001258, 06001259
- NMSRCP No.: 1890

Significant dates
- Added to NRHP: January 17, 2007
- Designated NMSRCP: April 7, 2006

Glenrio, formerly Rock Island, is an unincorporated community in both Deaf Smith County, Texas, and Quay County, New Mexico, United States. Located on the former U.S. Route 66, the ghost town sits on the Texas–New Mexico state line. It includes the Glenrio Historic District, which was listed on the National Register of Historic Places in 2007. Glenrio has one active business, a cannabis dispensary, located on the New Mexico side, where recreational cannabis sale and usage is legal. About 1/4 mile (0.4 km) south from Glenrio on State Line Road, is an active cattle ranch on the New Mexico side of the state line.

The community was founded in 1903 as a railroad siding on the Rock Island Railroad. Its name is derived from Scots glen 'glen' and from Spanish rio 'river'.

== History ==
Originally a railroad town, the village was renamed from Rock Island to Glenrio by the Rock Island and Pacific Railroad in 1908, and began receiving motorists on the dusty Ozark Trail in 1917. Its original structures were adobe buildings. The circa-1910 Angel House was in New Mexico.

The Ozark Trail was formed into U.S. Route 66 on November 11, 1926. By the 1930s, U.S. Route 66 was a paved, two-lane road served locally by several filling stations, a restaurant, and a motel. The road was widened in the 1950s. A Texaco station (1950) and a diner (Brownlee Diner/Little Juarez Café, 1952) were constructed in Texas using the art moderne architectural style.

The location of Glenrio on the Texas and New Mexico border led to some interesting business practices. At one point, all fuel was dispensed in Texas due to New Mexico's higher gasoline taxes. The 1930s State Line Bar and motel were built in New Mexico because Deaf Smith County, Texas, was dry at the time. The railroad station was in Texas. The local post office, built around 1935, was in New Mexico. A water tank and windmill in New Mexico were constructed around 1945.

The Joseph Brownlee House, constructed in Amarillo in 1930, was moved to Glenrio in 1950. Glenrio was the site of the "First Motel in Texas" / "Last Motel in Texas" (Homer Ehresman's family-run 1953 State Line Café and Gas Station and 1955 Texas Longhorn Motel, closed in 1976) and other businesses that straddled the state line on U.S. Route 66 for many years until Interstate 40 bypassed the community in September 1973.

Three filling stations (the 1925 Broyles Mobil station, a 1935 Texaco, and the 1946 Ferguson gas station) once operated in New Mexico.

It went into decline during 1975 when Interstate 40 had bypassed the town.

For years, a simmering dispute had existed over of which state the east part of Glenrio is lawfully a part of. The straight north–south border between the two states was originally defined as the 103rd meridian, but the 1859 survey that was supposed to mark that boundary mistakenly set the border between 2.29 and 3.77 miles (3.69 and 6.07 km) too far west of that line, making the current towns of Texline, Farwell, Bledsoe, Bronco and the eastern part of Glenrio appear to be within Texas. New Mexico's short border with Oklahoma, in contrast, was surveyed on the correct meridian. New Mexico's draft constitution in 1910 stated that the border is on the 103rd meridian as intended. The disputed strip, hundreds of miles long, includes parts of valuable oilfields of the Permian Basin. A bill was passed in the New Mexico Senate to fund and file a lawsuit in the U.S. Supreme Court to recover the strip from Texas, but the bill did not become law. Today, land in the strip is included in Texas land surveys and the land and towns (including the east part of Glenrio) for all purposes are taxed and governed by the State of Texas.

== Location ==
Glenrio sits just a few yards to the south of Interstate 40 at Texas exit 0 on Business I-40, a road which turns into a local gravel road at the state line. This was the original Route 66 alignment between Glenrio and San Jon until 1952, and was paved for many years until Quay County removed the paving due to maintenance costs. State Line Road begins at an intersection with former US-66 at the Texas/New Mexico state line at the center of Glenrio, and runs south straddling the state line. Mail was formerly served by a post office on the New Mexico side of the town.

The town consists of the remains of the courtyard motel and related Texas Longhorn Café and Phillips 66 service station, the post office, a few other buildings including the diner and adjacent Texaco service station, the old Route 66 roadbed, and the former roadbed of the Rock Island Railroad, whose tracks were removed in the 1980s. A few homes still exist in Glenrio; the Joseph Brownlee House and an office in the Texas Longhorn Motel were the last to be occupied.

=== Glenrio Historic District ===
Glenrio Historic District is a 31.7-acre (12.8 ha) historic district that was listed on the National Register of Historic Places in 2007. At the time of the listing, the district included 12 contributing buildings and four other contributing structures.

=== Glenrio Welcome Center ===
On June 25, 2008, the State of New Mexico opened the Glenrio Welcome Center on Interstate 40 at the Texas state line. The center includes a pet walk, a livestock corral, wireless Internet access, a movie theater, and information kiosks. Built to accommodate one million visitors per year, it includes green features such as recycling of greywater for grounds irrigation, and a wind turbine to generate 20% of the center's energy.

== In cinema ==
Portions of The Grapes of Wrath (1940) were filmed in Glenrio. An abandoned "Glenn Rio Motel" is depicted in the town of Radiator Springs in 2006's animated film Cars, where the architectural design of Glenrio's Little Juarez Café is used for a vacant, abandoned building, which eventually becomes the Racing Museum. The opening scene from the movie Daylight's End (2018) was filmed in Glenrio.

== Photo gallery ==
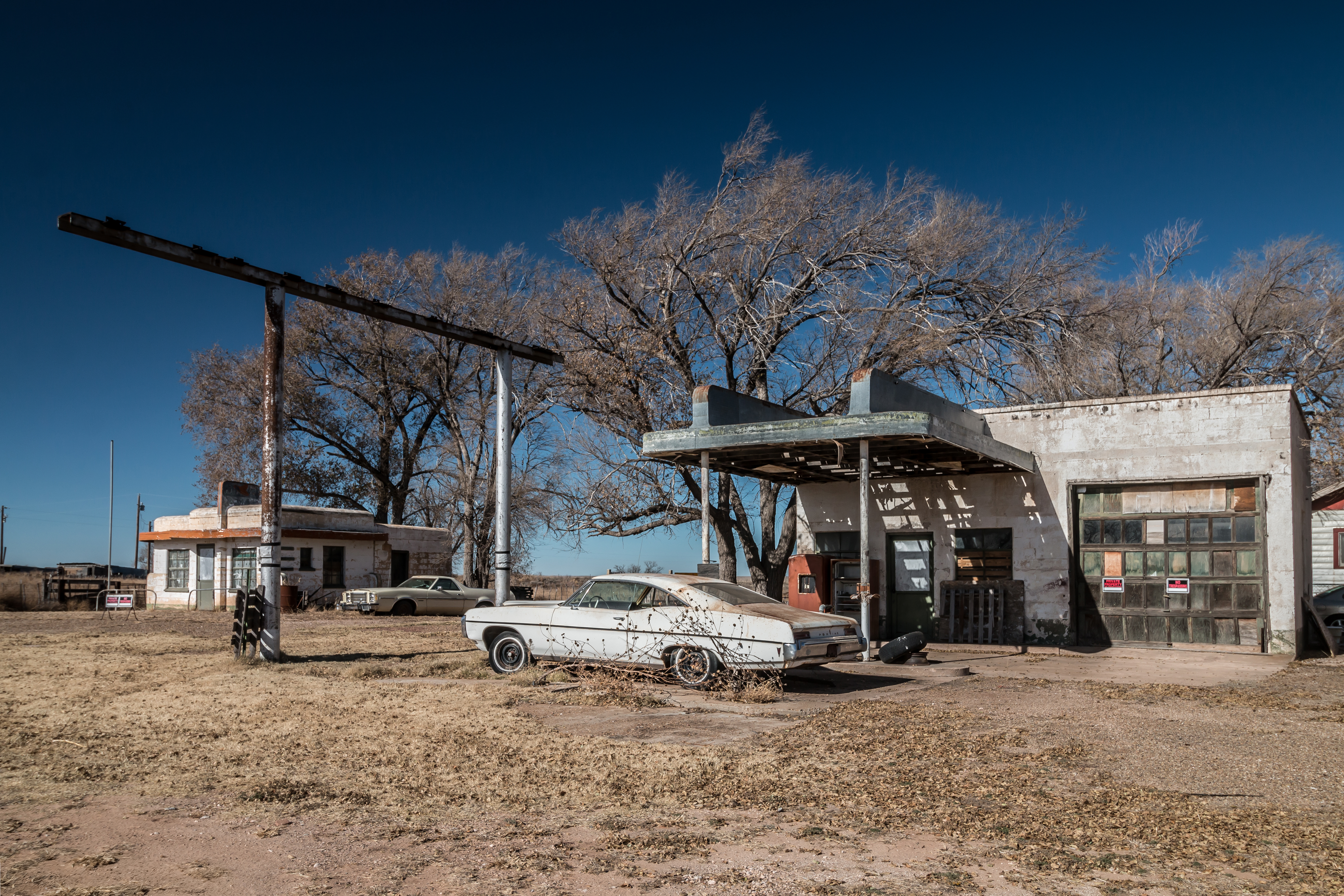
Closed café and gas station in Glenrio

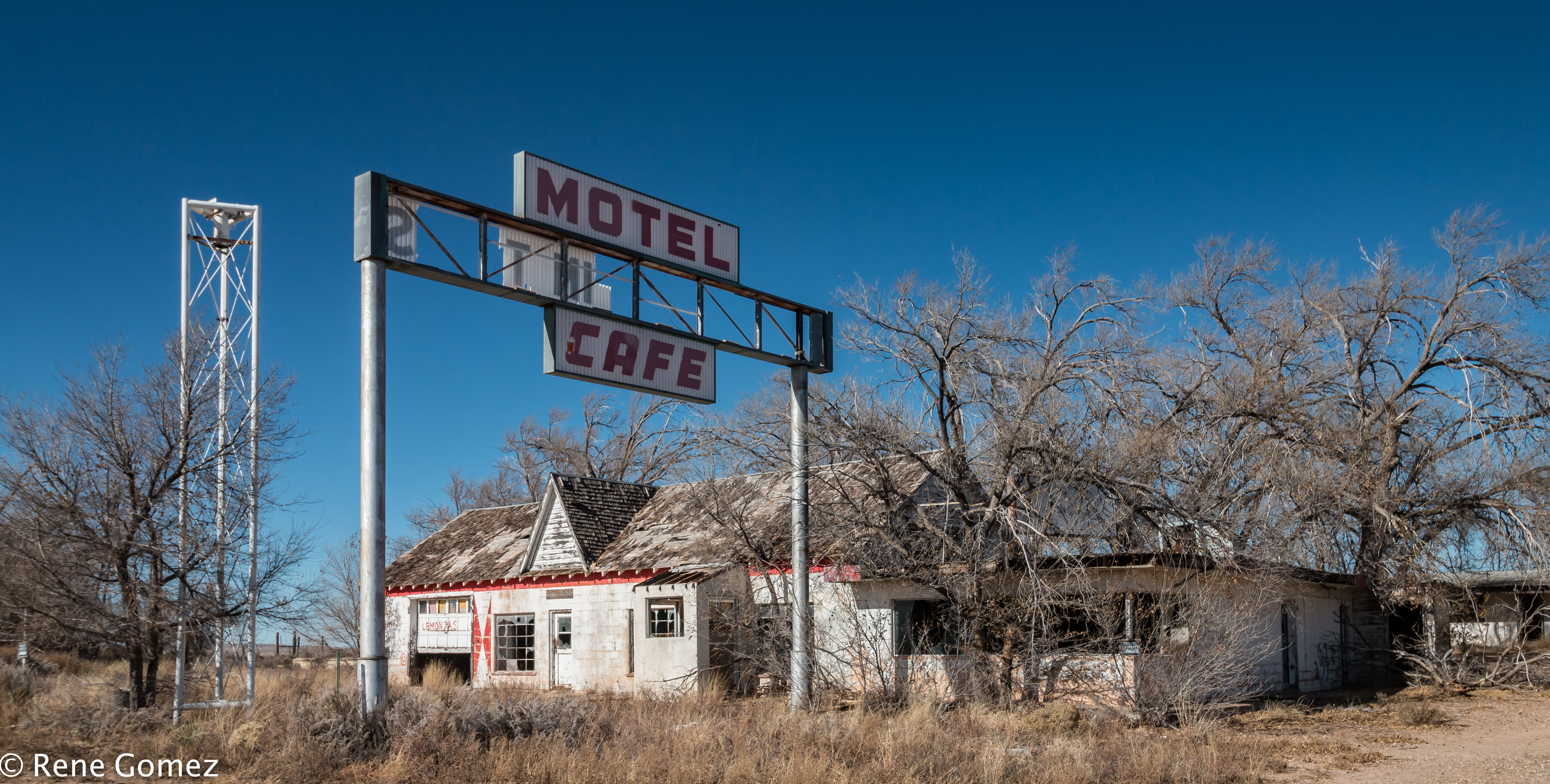
Closed hotel in Glenrio

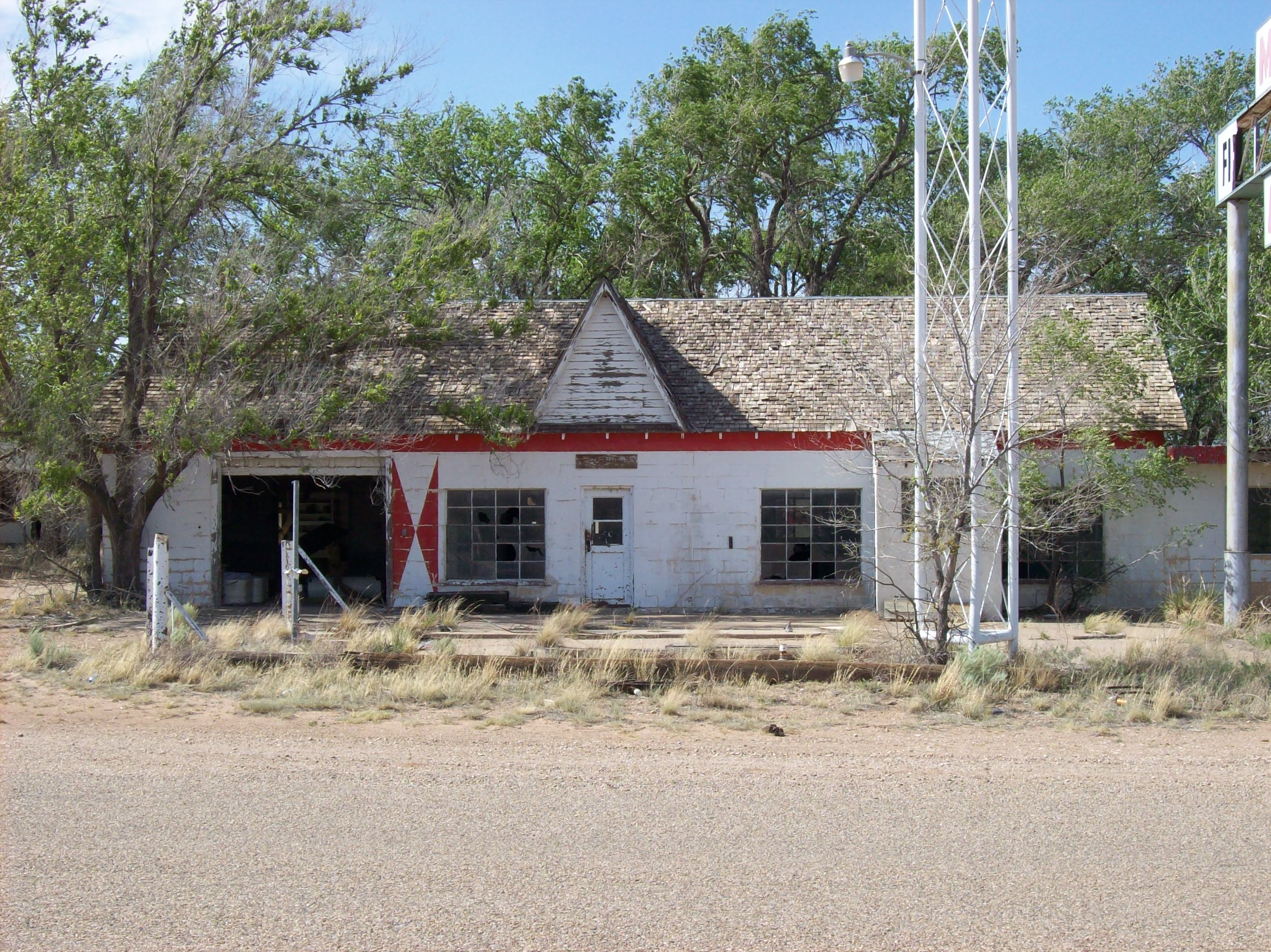
First/Last Motel in Texas, Glenrio

== See also ==
- National Register of Historic Places listings in Quay County, New Mexico
- National Register of Historic Places listings in Deaf Smith County, Texas
