= Business routes of Interstate 40 =

Interstate 40 Business

Location
- Country: United States

Highway system
- Interstate Highway System; Main; Auxiliary; Suffixed; Business; Future

Interstate business routes are roads connecting a central or commercial district of a city or town with an Interstate bypass. These roads typically follow along local streets often along a former U.S. Route or state highway that had been replaced by an Interstate. Interstate business route reassurance markers are signed as either loops or spurs using a green shield shaped and numbered like the shield of the parent Interstate highway.

Along Interstate 40 (I-40), business routes are found in the five westernmost states through which I-40 passes, California, Arizona, New Mexico, Texas, and Oklahoma. The Interstate has no business routes along its passage through Arkansas nor Tennessee, and there once was a business route in North Carolina, but it was decommissioned in 2020.

Some states regard Interstate business routes as fully integrated within their state highway system, while other states consider them to be either local roads to be maintained by county or municipal authorities or a hybrid of state and local control.

Although the public may differentiate between different business routes by the number of the parent route and the location of the route, there is no uniform naming convention. Each state highway department internally uses its own designations to identify segments within its jurisdiction.

From central Oklahoma westward, the business routes often follow the historic alignment of the former U.S. Route 66 (US 66).

== California ==
Interstate business routes in California are assigned by the California Department of Transportation (Caltrans), but are not maintained by Caltrans unless they overlay other routes of the state highway system. Local authorities may request route assignment from the Caltrans Transportation System Information Program, and all requests require approval of the executive committee of the American Association of State Highway and Transportation Officials (AASHTO).

=== Needles ===
Interstate 40 Business
- Location: Needles
- Length: 3.3 mi (5.3 km)

Interstate 40 Business (I-40 Bus.) is a business loop of I-40 through Needles in San Bernardino County that begins at exit 141 of I-40/US 95 northwest of town. The unsigned highway follows Broadway to the southeast to Needles Highway, then eastward through an underpass of I-40 into the town center. At N Street, the loop turns southward into the southern part of town where it reconnects with Broadway. The route then continues southeastward to I-40 exit 144 where it terminates and US 95 continues southward along Broadway. The route largely follows the former route of US 66 through town except where the historic highway's path has since been disrupted by the construction of I-40.

Junction list

The entire route is in Needles, San Bernardino County.

mi	km	Destinations	Notes
0.00– 0.3	0.00– 0.48	I-40 / US 95 (Needles Freeway) / River Road (Historic US 66 west) – Las Vegas, Barstow, Kingman	Western terminus; I-40 exit 141; west end of Historic US 66 concurrency; road continues as Historic US 66 west (River Road)
1.0	1.6	Needles Highway east to SR 95 north – Bullhead City	
1.6	2.6	J Street to I-40	Serves Colorado River Medical Center
3.3	5.3	I-40 (Needles Freeway) / US 95 (Historic US 66 east) – Kingman, Barstow, Lake Havasu City, Blythe	Eastern terminus; I-40 exit 144; east end of Historic US 66 concurrency; road continues as US 95 south / Historic US 66 east
1.000 mi = 1.609 km; 1.000 km = 0.621 mi: Concurrency terminus

== Arizona ==
The business loops within Arizona are maintained by the Arizona Department of Transportation (ADOT) and by municipal authorities. I-40 has five business loops within the state located in Seligman, Ash Fork, Flagstaff, Joseph City, and Holbrook, and a business spur in Winslow. The state formerly had business loops in Kingman and Winslow, as well as a second loop in Flagstaff. ADOT internally identifies each Interstate business route as a State Business Route with the number of the parent Interstate. Individual loops along an Interstate are designated by adding parenthetical numbers that increase eastward and northward. Gaps in numbering represent removal of former routes or potential expansion.

=== Kingman ===
Interstate 40 Business
- State Business Route 40 (0)
- Location: Kingman
- Length: 0.56 mi (Note: Official route lengths in Arizona reflect road segments within the state highway inventory and not portions of the route under municipal control and maintenance.) (900 m)
- Existed: c. 1998–2009

State Business Route 40 (0) (SR 40B (0)) was a former business loop of I-40 at Kingman in Mohave County. The 3.7-mile (6.0 km) loop began at I-40 exit 48 where US 93 approaches the intersection from the west along Beale Street and joins the Interstate while the loop proceeded eastward along Beale Street. After a short distance, the loop joined Andy Devine Avenue which carried the former US 66. The loop turned northward, returning to I-40 and US 93 at exit 53 where the loop terminated, but the roadway continues forward, carrying SR 66.

Junction list

The entire route was in Kingman, Mohave County.

mi	km	Destinations	Notes
0.00	0.00	I-40 / US 93 – Los Angeles, Flagstaff, Phoenix, Las Vegas	Western terminus; I-40 exit 48; highway continued west on Beale Street as US 93 north (former US 466 west)
0.37	0.60	Grandview Avenue / Andy Divine Avenue to Historic US 66	East end state maintenance; I-40 BL was maintained by city of Kingman between mile 0.37 and 3.56
		Historic US 66 west (Andy Divine Avenue west) – Oatman	Western end of concurrency with Historic US 66
3.56	5.73	Michael Street	West end state maintenance; I-40 BL was maintained by city of Kingman between mile 0.37 and 3.56
3.73	6.00	I-40 / US 93 / SR 66 (Andy Devine Avenue east) / Historic US 66 east – Los Angeles, Las Vegas, Flagstaff, Phoenix, Peach Springs	Eastern terminus; eastern end of concurrency with Historic US 66; I-40 exit 53; road continued as Historic US 66 east (SR 66 east)
1.000 mi = 1.609 km; 1.000 km = 0.621 mi: Concurrency terminus

=== Seligman ===
Interstate 40 Business
- State Business Route 40 (1)
- Location: Seligman
- Length: 4.25 mi (6.84 km)
- Existed: 1983–present

State Business Route 40 (1) (SR 40B (1)) is a business loop of I-40 at Seligman in Yavapai County. The 4.24-mile (6.82 km) loop begins at I-40 exit 121 on the west end of town and proceeds northward, passing over the former SR 66, a local road still signed as a state route that is a former alignment of US 66. The loop then takes a semicircular path near the Seligman Airport, returning to Historic US 66, where the loop turns east through town. At the eastern edge of town, the loop turns south, returning to I-40 at exit 123.

Junction list

The entire route is in Seligman, Yavapai County.

mi	km	Destinations	Notes
0.00	0.00	I-40 – Los Angeles, Flagstaff	Western terminus; I-40 exit 121
1.16	1.87	Historic US 66 west (Hualapai Veterans Highway) / SR 66 west – Peach Springs	Western end of Historic US 66 and SR 66 concurrencies; ADOT signs this as eastern terminus of SR 66
2.26	3.64	Historic US 66 east (Crookton Road) – Crookton	Eastern end of Historic US 66 concurrency
4.25	6.84	I-40 / SR 66 ends – Los Angeles, Flagstaff	Eastern terminus; eastern end of SR 66 concurrency; I-40 exit 123
1.000 mi = 1.609 km; 1.000 km = 0.621 mi

=== Ash Fork ===
Interstate 40 Business
- State Business Route 40 (2)
- Location: Ash Fork
- Length: 1.49 mi (2.40 km)
- Existed: 1989–present

State Business Route 40 (2) (SR 40B (2)) is a business loop of I-40 through Ash Fork in Yavapai County. The highway is co-signed with Historic U.S. Route 66 for its entire length. The 1.5-mile (2.4 km) loop begins at I-40 exit 145 and proceeds to the northeast along the western edge of town. The loop passes through town as a divided route with eastbound traffic following Park Avenue and westbound traffic routed along Lewis Avenue. The roadways combine on the east end of town, and the loop returns south, terminating at I-40 exit 146. The roadway continues south beyond I-40 as SR 89.

Junction list

The entire route is in Yavapai County.

Location	mi	km	Destinations	Notes
Ash Fork	0.00	0.00	I-40 – Los Angeles, Flagstaff Historic US 66 begins	Western terminus of BL 40/Historic US 66; I-40 exit 145
	1.49	2.40	Historic US 66 ends I-40 / SR 89 south – Los Angeles, Flagstaff, Prescott	Eastern terminus of BL 40/Historic US 66; I-40 exit 146; road continues south as SR 89
1.000 mi = 1.609 km; 1.000 km = 0.621 mi

=== Williams ===
Interstate 40 Business
- State Business Route 40 (3)
- Location: Williams
- Length: 3.98 mi (6.41 km)
- Existed: 1984–1990

State Business Route 40 (3) (SR 40B (3)) was a business loop of I-40 through Williams in Coconino County. The four-mile (6.4 km) loop began at I-40 exit 161 west of Williams and took US 66 into town. In the town center of Williams, the eastbound and westbound lanes of the loop diverged into a oneway pair near 9th Street. The eastbound lans used the appropriately named "Route 66" while the westbound utilized Railroad Avenue. A junction at 2nd Street provided access to I-40 exit 163 and the Grand Canyon Railway station. East of town, the westbound and eastbound lanes of the loop reconverged. The loop curved northeast at Bearizona Wildlife Park before arriving at a junction with I-40 exit 165, the diamond interchange served as the eastern terminus of the loop. The road continued straight ahead as SR 64, which has its western terminus at exit 165. This route was a former section of US 66 and US 89. On August 16, 1990, ownership and maintenance of the business route was handed over to the city of Williams, and the designation was decommissioned.

Junction list

The entire route was in Coconino County.

Location	mi	km	Destinations	Notes
	162.00	260.71	I-40 – Los Angeles, Flagstaff	Western terminus; I-40 exit 161; road continued as Country Club Drive
Williams	163.62	263.32	Grand Canyon Boulevard to I-40	To I-40 exit 165
	165.98	267.12	I-40 / SR 64 east – Los Angeles, Flagstaff, Grand Canyon	Eastern terminus; I-40 exit 165; highway continued north as SR 64
1.000 mi = 1.609 km; 1.000 km = 0.621 mi: Concurrency terminus

=== Flagstaff ===
I-40 has both a current route traversing the city of Flagstaff in Coconino County and a former route previously on the city's eastside.

==== Current route ====
Interstate 40 Business
- State Business Route 40 (4)
- Location: Flagstaff
- Length: 9.67 mi (15.56 km)
- Existed: 1988–present

State Business Route 40 (4) (SR 40B (4)) is a business loop of I-40 through Flagstaff in Coconino County. The 6.7-mile (10.8 km) loop begins at I-40 exit 191 west of Flagstaff and enters the city following the former route of US 66. In central Flagstaff, the loop intersects SR 89A at Milton Road. The loop turns north and follows Milton Road and then turns east along the street known as Route 66 (formerly Santa Fe Avenue) before intersecting US 180 at Humphreys Street. The loop continues to the east side of Flagstaff, where Route 66 diverges carrying the former alignment of SR 40B (5), before intersecting US 89. From this intersection, the loop turns southward along Country Club Drive until terminating at I-40 exit 201.

Junction list

The entire route is in Coconino County.

Location	mi	km	Destinations	Notes
	0.00	0.00	I-40 – Los Angeles, Albuquerque Historic US 66 begins	Western termini of BL 40 and Historic US 66; west end of Historic US 66 overlap; I-40 exit 191
	0.53	0.85	East end state maintenance	
Flagstaff	1.90	3.06	West end state maintenance at Flagstaff city limits	
Flagstaff	4.20	6.76	SR 89A south (Milton Road south) to I-17 / I-40 – Sedona, Phoenix	Former US 89A
Flagstaff	4.81	7.74	US 180 west (Humphreys Street) – Arizona Snow Bowl, Grand Canyon, Museum of Northern Arizona	West end of US 180 overlap
Flagstaff	4.88	7.85	Beaver Street south / Amtrak station	Beaver Street is one-way
Flagstaff	8.57	13.79	Fanning Drive	East end state maintenance
Flagstaff	8.9	14.3	Historic US 66 east	East end of Historic US 66 overlap
Flagstaff	9.14	14.71	US 89 north – Page	Former interchange, now an at-grade T-intersection
Flagstaff	9.67	15.56	I-40 west to I-17 – Phoenix, Los Angeles I-40 / US 180 east – Albuquerque	ADOT signs this as eastern terminus; east end of US 180 overlap; I-40 exit 201; road continues south as Country Club Drive
1.000 mi = 1.609 km; 1.000 km = 0.621 mi: Concurrency terminus

==== Former route ====
Interstate 40 Business
- State Business Route 40 (5)
- Location: Flagstaff
- Length: 0.87 mi (1,400 m)
- Existed: 2002–2008

State Business Route 40 (5) (SR 40B (5)) was a former business loop on the eastside of the city of Flagstaff in Coconino County. The 4.6-mile (7.4 km) loop began at the combined route of SR 40B and US 180 and followed Santa Fe Avenue eastward, underpassing the current business route. The loop continued along the former US 66, connecting with I-40 and US 180 at exit 204 for Walnut Canyon Road along the city's eastern edge. The loop was decommissioned in 2008 and returned to the city for maintenance.

Junction list

The entire route was in Flagstaff, Coconino County.

mi	km	Destinations	Notes
0.00	0.00	BL 40 / US 180 (Santa Fe Avenue) – Grand Canyon	Western terminus
4.64	7.47	I-40 / US 180 – Los Angeles, Albuquerque	Eastern terminus; I-40 exit 204
1.000 mi = 1.609 km; 1.000 km = 0.621 mi

=== Winslow ===
==== Current route ====
Interstate 40 Business Spur
- State Route 40 Spur
- Location: Winslow
- Length: 1.2 mi (1.9 km)
- Existed: 1984–present

U.S. Route 66 Spur
- Existed: 1970–1984

Interstate 40 Business Spur or State Route 40 Spur (BS 40 or SR 40 Spur) is a business spur of I-40 located in Navajo County serving the city of Winslow. The 1.2-mile (1.9 km) spur begins at I-40/US 180 exit 252 and follows Hipkoe Drive south while concurrent with SR 99. At the intersection with 3rd Street, the two highways split; SR 99 heads east, while SR 40S heads west. After crossing over the BNSF railway, the spur continues for 0.19 miles (0.31 km), ending just north of the intersection of Cooperstown Road and the county line.

BS 40 was originally designated US 66 Spur on June 15, 1970. The route was re-routed onto a new alignment on August 23, 1974. US 66 Spur was redesignated as BL 40 Spur on October 26, 1984, when US 66 and all of its associated suffixed routes in Arizona were decommissioned and redesignated as SR 66 or business routes of I-40, where US 66 wasn't concurrent with I-40.

Junction list

The entire route is in Navajo County.

Location	mi	km	Destinations	Notes
	0.00	0.00	Winslow Industrial Spur	Continuation beyond western terminus
	0.18	0.29	Bridge over BNSF railway	
Winslow	1.01	1.63	SR 99 south / Historic US 66 east (3rd Street east) to SR 87 – Payson	South end of SR 99/Historic US 66 concurrency
Winslow	1.2	1.9	Historic US 66 ends SR 99 north / I-40 (US 180) – Flagstaff, Albuquerque	Northern terminus; north end of SR 99/Historic US 66 concurrency; I-40 exit 252; road continues north as Hipkoe Drive
1.000 mi = 1.609 km; 1.000 km = 0.621 mi: Concurrency terminus

==== Former route ====
Interstate 40 Business
- State Business Route 40 (6)
- Location: Winslow
- Length: 3.63 mi (5.84 km)
- Existed: 1968–2007

State Business Route 40 (6) (SR 40B (6)) is a former business loop of I-40 in Winslow that ran along former US 66 from exit 252 to exit 255.

=== Joseph City ===
Interstate 40 Business
- State Business Route 40 (7)
- Location: Joseph City
- Length: 2.83 mi (4.55 km)
- Existed: 1985–present

State Business Route 40 (7) (SR 40B (7)) in Joseph City runs along former US 66 from exit 274 to exit 277.

=== Holbrook ===
Interstate 40 Business
- State Business Route 40 (8)
- Location: Holbrook
- Length: 5.10 mi (8.21 km)
- Existed: 1996–present

State Business Route 40 (8) (SR 40B (8)) in Holbrook runs along part of current US 180 and former US 66 as well as SR 77 from exit 285 to exit 289.

== New Mexico ==
All of the business loops within New Mexico are maintained by the New Mexico Department of Transportation (NMDOT). In New Mexico, Interstate business routes are named independently of their parent Interstate's designation, with business loops of I-25 numbered between 10 and 19, those of I-10 between 20 and 29, and those of I-40 between 30 and 39. New Mexico business loop numbers ascend eastward and northward with gaps in numbering to allow for future designations. Within New Mexico, I-40 currently has business routes in Moriarty, Santa Rosa, and Tucumcari.

=== Gallup ===
Interstate 40 Business
- Location: Gallup
- Length: 9.5 mi (15.3 km)
- Existed: ????

Business Loop 31 (BL 31) in Gallup is a former business loop that ran along part of former US 66 from an interchange at exit 16 to another interchange at exit 26.

=== Grants ===
Interstate 40 Business
- Location: Grants
- Existed: ????

Business Loop 32 (BL 32) in Grants is a former business loop that ran along part of former US 66 from an interchange at exit 79 in Milan to another interchange at exit 85. It also had a connecting spur at exit 81.

=== Albuquerque ===
Interstate 40 Business
- Location: Albuquerque
- Length: 18 mi (29 km)
- Existed: ????

Business Loop 33 (BL 33) in Albuquerque is a former business loop that ran along part of former US 66 from a former Y-interchange at eastbound exit 149 to a half diamond/partial cloverleaf interchange at exit 167. The Y-interchange was rebuilt between 2009 and 2011 for Atrisco Vista Boulevard for the conversion of that interchange from a westbound half diamond interchange to a full diamond interchange. The route followed Central Avenue through downtown Albuquerque from I-40 at Tramway Boulevard (NM-556) to Atrisco Vista Boulevard (NM-500). The Business Loop 40 designation was removed from Central Avenue in the 1990s when NMDOT turned over ownership and maintenance of Central Avenue to the City of Albuquerque, although some remnant BUSINESS 40/US-66 remain along Central Avenue.

=== Moriarty ===
Interstate 40 Business
- Location: Moriarty
- Length: 2.922 mi (4.703 km)

Business Loop 34 (BL 34) in Moriarty runs along part of former US 66. It begins at a trumpet interchange at exit 194 and begins traveling east, intersecting State Road 333 (NM 333). It continues west after that, intersecting NM 41 before reaching its eastern terminus at a flyover interchange with an additional east-to-west ramp at exit 197.

Junction list

The entire route is in Moriarty, Torrance County.

mi	km	Destinations	Notes
0.000	0.000	I-40	Western terminus; I-40 exit 194; trumpet interchange
		NM 333 west – Edgewood	Eastern terminus of NM 333
		NM 41 – Galisteo, Estancia	
2.922	4.703	I-40	Eastern terminus; I-40 exit 197; flyover interchange
1.000 mi = 1.609 km; 1.000 km = 0.621 mi

=== Santa Rosa ===
Interstate 40 Business
- Location: Santa Rosa
- Length: 4.367 mi (7.028 km)

Business Loop 35 (BL 35) in Santa Rosa runs along former US 66 from exit 273 to exit 277. It also overlaps part of US 54 and all of US 84. Along the way, it also intersects the northern terminus of NM 91.

Junction list

The entire route is in Santa Rosa, Guadalupe County.

mi	km	Destinations	Notes
0.000	0.000	I-40 / US 84 – Albuquerque, Tucumcari	Western terminus; I-40 exit 273
		US 54 south	Western end of US 54 concurrency; serves Guadalupe County Hospital
		NM 91 south – Softball complex, National Guard armory	Northern terminus of NM 91
		I-40 (US 84) – Albuquerque, Tucumcari	I-40 exit 275
4.367	7.028	US 54 east / I-40 / US 84 – Tucumcari, Albuquerque	Eastern terminus; eastern end of US 54 concurrency; I-40 exit 277; highway continues south as US 84
1.000 mi = 1.609 km; 1.000 km = 0.621 mi: Concurrency terminus

=== Tucumcari ===
Interstate 40 Business
- Location: Tucumcari
- Length: 7.652 mi (12.315 km)

Business Loop 36 (BL 36) in Tucumcari runs along part of former US 66 from a trumpet interchange at exit 329 to a diamond interchange at exit 335. It intersects NM 104 and NM 209 in the center of Tucumcari.

Junction list

The entire route is in Tucumcari, Quay County.

mi	km	Destinations	Notes
0.000	0.000	I-40 (US 54) – Amarillo, Albuquerque	Western terminus; I-40 exit 329; trumpet interchange
		NM 237 east (Bus. Loop US 54)	Western terminus of NM 237
		NM 104 west (First Street north) / NM 209 south (First Street south)	Eastern terminus of NM 104, northern terminus of NM 209
		US 54	
7.652	12.315	I-40 – Amarillo, Albuquerque	Eastern terminus; I-40 exit 335; diamond interchange
1.000 mi = 1.609 km; 1.000 km = 0.621 mi

== Texas ==
The business loops within Texas are maintained by the Texas Department of Transportation (TxDOT). I-40 has seven business loops in the state, all located in the Panhandle region. TxDOT identifies each business route as Business Interstate 40 followed by an alphabetic suffix. Along Texas Interstates, the alphabetic suffixes on business route names ascend eastward and northward. There are gaps in the alphabetic values to allow for future system expansion. The alphabetic naming suffixes are included as small letters on the bottom of reassurance shields.

=== Glenrio ===
Business Interstate 40-A
- Location: Glenrio
- Length: 0.779 mi (1,254 m)
- Existed: 1990–present

Business Interstate 40-A (Bus. I-40-A) is a business spur of I-40 in Glenrio that begins at I-40 exit 0 just east of the New Mexico–Texas state line. The highway runs south from the interchange toward former US 66, then turns west along that decommissioned route where it terminates at the Texas–New Mexico state line.

=== Adrian ===
Business Interstate 40-B
- Location: Adrian
- Length: 2.369 mi (3.813 km)
- Existed: 1990–present

Business Interstate 40-B (Bus. I-40-B) is a business loop of I-40 in Adrian that begins at I-40 exit 22 and runs along former US 66 to exit 23, the latter of which also includes the northern terminus of State Highway 214 (SH 214).

Bus. I-40-B begins and ends at on- and offramps leading to and from two-way frontage roads along I-40, which, in the case of the one on the northbound side, is a genuine former section of US 66. Eastbound Bus. I-40-B immediately turns north on Oldham County Road 22, which runs across an overpass above I-40 before terminating at Historic US 66, then turns right, where it encounters the official Midway Point of Historic US 66, as well as a cafe and motel focused on this theme. East of there at the intersection with Grand Avenue, the post office is diagonally across from a campground, and, beyond that point, the road runs past some silos. When the route intersects the westbound offramp for exit 22, which is the official westbound beginning of Bus. I-40-B, eastbound Bus. I-40-B runs toward the northern terminus of SH 214, then turns south, overlapping that route until it runs above I-40 again, before turning east on the frontage road until finally leaving at the onramp ending at I-40 itself.

Junction list

The entire route is in Oldham County.

Location	mi	km	Destinations	Notes
	0.0	0.0	I-40 / County Road 22	I-40 exit 22
Adrian	1.7	2.7	SH 214 to I-40 east – Amarillo	
	2.4	3.9	I-40 Frontage Road	I-40 exit 23
1.000 mi = 1.609 km; 1.000 km = 0.621 mi

=== Vega ===
Business Interstate 40-C
- Location: Vega
- Length: 3.395 mi (5.464 km)
- Existed: 1990–present

Business Interstate 40-C (Bus. I-40-C) is a business loop of I-40 in Vega that runs along former US 66 between two modified trumpet interchanges at exit 35 and exit 37.

Bus. I-40-C begins and ends at on- and offramps leading to and from two-way frontage roads along I-40, which, in the case of the one on the northbound side, is a genuine former section of US 66. Eastbound Bus. I-40-C immediately turns southeast, away from the former Choctaw, Oklahoma and Gulf Railroad line, which was acquired and later abandoned by the Rock Island Railroad. The surrounding landscape is completely barren until the road encounters a hotel. From 14th to 13th streets, the road curves from southeast to straight east. The sole main intersection along the route is US 385 (South Main Street), which contains intersection beacons. Though all of Bus. I-40-C is named Route 66, as well as Vega Boulevard, an older segment of the iconic route turned north in an overlap with US 385, and turned west onto West Main Street ending just east of where the intersection with the eastbound exit 35 ramps are. Between 7th and 6th streets, Bus. I-40-C passes a TxDOT construction and maintenance facility and then curves southeast again east of 3rd Street to follow along the southside of the former Choctaw Route. After the intersection with 1st Street, the surroundings become barren once again, with the exception of one ranch on the southside. Bus. I-40-C ends at exit 37 on I-40, and the former segment of US 66 along the northside continues as one of the two I-40 frontage roads.

Junction list

The entire route is in Oldham County.

Location	mi	km	Destinations	Notes
	0.0	0.0	I-40 – Adrian, Tucumcari	I-40 exit 35
Vega	1.6	2.6	US 385 – Boys Ranch, Channing, Hereford	
	3.4	5.5	I-40 – Oldham County Airport	I-40 exit 37
1.000 mi = 1.609 km; 1.000 km = 0.621 mi

=== Amarillo ===
Business Interstate 40-D
- Location: Amarillo
- Length: 14.125 mi (Note: The certified length given is shorter than the actual mileage, as the TxDOT description of Bus. I-40-D considers it to be discontinuous at rather than concurrent with US 60 in Amarillo.) (22.732 km)
- Existed: 1990–present

Business Interstate 40-D (Bus. I-40-D) is a business loop of I-40 in Amarillo that begins at I-40 exit 62A just west of Amarillo. The highway was formerly a business route for US 66, being that highway's only bannered route in Texas. Bus. I-40-D is known locally as Amarillo Boulevard and is the longest business route of I-40.

Bus. I-40-D begins at I-40 exit 62A just west of Amarillo near Cadillac Ranch. The highway runs east through a low developed area before entering the Amarillo city limits just before an intersection with State Highway Loop 335 (Loop 335, Soncy Road). Bus. I-40-D turns northeast at an interchange with Coulter Street/Wolffin Avenue before briefly running north at an interchange with Southwest 9th Avenue/Bell Street (near the main campus of Amarillo College). The highway starts turning northeast at Tascosa Road/Gem Lake Road before running straight east at the North Western Street interchange. After this interchange, Bus. I-40-D begins to travel through a heavily developed area of the city before meeting US 60/US 87/US 287 just north of downtown and begins an overlap with US 60. The two highways continue to travel through a heavily developed area of the city, with the development becoming more sparse after the SH 136 intersection. Bus. I-40-D becomes a divided highway after an interchange with Loop 335 (Lakeside Drive) and runs along the northern border of Rick Husband Amarillo International Airport. Just after leaving the Amarillo city limits, US 60 leaves the highway and Bus. I-40-D starts to run southeast. Bus. I-40-D meets its eastern terminus at I-40 exit 85.

Junction list

County	Location	mi	km	Destinations	Notes
Potter		0.00	0.00	I-40 west	Interchange; no direct access to I-40 east; I-40 exit 62A
Potter	Amarillo	2.1	3.4	Loop 335 (Soncy Road)	
Potter	Amarillo	2.8	4.5	Wolffin Avenue / Coulter Street / Hagy Road / Port Lane	Partial interchange; Wolffin Road not signed westbound, Hagy Road and Port Lane not signed eastbound
Potter	Amarillo	4.3	6.9	Bell Street	Interchange
Potter	Amarillo	4.3	6.9	SW 9th Avenue (Loop 279 east)	Former Bus. US 66
Potter	Amarillo	5.0	8.0	RM 1061 north (Tascosa Road) / Gem Lake Road	
Potter	Amarillo	6.2	10.0	FM 1719 north (Western Street)	Interchange
Potter	Amarillo	9.2	14.8	US 287 south (Taylor Street)	One-way street
Potter	Amarillo	9.3	15.0	US 87 north (Fillmore Street)	One-way street
Potter	Amarillo	9.4	15.1	US 60 west / US 87 south (Pierce Street)	One-way street, outbound access only to US 60; west end of US 60 overlap; former westbound Bus. US 66
Potter	Amarillo	9.5	15.3	US 287 north / US 60 (Buchanan Street)	One-way street, inbound access only from US 60; former eastbound Bus. US 66
Potter	Amarillo	11.4	18.3	Lake Street	Interchange
Potter	Amarillo	12.1	19.5	SH 136 north – Borger	
Potter	Amarillo	14.4	23.2	Loop 335 (Lakeside Road) – Rick Husband Amarillo International Airport	Interchange
Potter	Amarillo	17.6	28.3	B Avenue – Amarillo College East Campus	Partial interchange
Potter	Amarillo	19.8	31.9	FM 1912 (Masterson Road)	Interchange
Potter		20.3	32.7	US 60 east – Panhandle	East end of US 60 overlap
Carson		24.3	39.1	FM 2575	
Carson		24.4	39.3	I-40 – Oklahoma City, Amarillo	Interchange; no access from EB I-40; I-40 west exit 85
1.000 mi = 1.609 km; 1.000 km = 0.621 mi: Concurrency terminus; Incomplete access

=== Groom ===
Business Interstate 40-F
- Location: Groom
- Length: 3.533 mi (5.686 km)
- Existed: 1990–present

Business Interstate 40-F (Bus. I-40-F) is a business loop of I-40 in Groom that begins at I-40 exit 110 and runs along former US 66 to exit 114. It is one of the few business routes to run along the southside of I-40 in Texas, rather than the northside.

Bus. I-40-F begins at the offramp for exit 110, leading to the I-40 frontage road along the eastbound lanes, which suddenly becomes a divided highway named "Route 66". The first intersection is a connecting road to the parts of the interchange with the eastbound onramp, as well as the frontage roads along the westbound lanes, leading to the western terminus of the business loop. Shortly after this is the barely paved Carson County Road BB. The divided highway ends just west of Farm to Market Road 295 (FM 295) and Carson County Road CC (Western Avenue) and gains the additional name of "Front Street". The route runs along the edge of town as a four-lane undivided highway with the southside lined with numerous massive grain silos along the abandoned Chicago, Rock Island and Gulf Railway line until the intersection with FM 2300 (Eastern Avenue), and, after passing by a TxDOT maintenance facility, the road become a divided highway once again. Little else exists along this segment. The last intersection is another connecting road to the eastbound offramp of exit 114, the frontage roads along the westbound lanes leading to the western beginning of the business loop, and an unorthodox roadside attraction known as the Leaning Tower of Texas. Bus. I-40-F ends at the onramp to eastbound I-40, as does the divided former US 66, which is converted back into the frontage road along the eastbound lanes of I-40.

Junction list

County	Location	mi	km	Destinations	Notes
Carson		0.0	0.0	I-40	I-40 exit 110
Carson	Groom	1.5	2.4	FM 295 north to I-40	
Carson	Groom	2.5	4.0	FM 2300 north to I-40	
Carson–Gray county line		3.5	5.6	I-40	I-40 exit 114
1.000 mi = 1.609 km; 1.000 km = 0.621 mi

=== McLean ===
Business Interstate 40-H
- Location: McLean
- Length: 3.796 mi (6.109 km)
- Existed: 1990–present

Business Interstate 40-H (Bus. I-40-H) is a business loop of I-40 in McLean that runs from exit 141 to exit 143. It begins at I-40 at an eastbound flyover interchange and runs northeast along former US 66. Before the intersection with 26th 1/2 Road, it curves to the southeast. After the intersection with SH 273, it splits into a oneway pair with eastbound Bus. I-40-H continuing along Railroad Street and westbound Bus. I-40-H moving onto First Street, one block to the north. This oneway pair runs through the McLean Commercial Historic District and comes to an end just at the intersection with a connecting road that brings eastbound Bus. I-40-H traffic under I-40 and then loops back from the south I-40 frontage road to end at I-40.

=== Shamrock ===
Business Interstate 40-J
- Location: Shamrock
- Length: 2.77 mi (4.46 km)
- Existed: 1993–present

Business Interstate 40-J (Bus. I-40-J) is a business loop of I-40 in Shamrock that is the easternmost business route of I-40 in Texas, running from exit 161 to exit 164 along historic US 66. It is another business route that runs along the southside of I-40 in Texas rather than the northside.

Bus. I-40-J begins at the offramp for exit 161 leading to the I-40 frontage road along the eastbound lanes, which, just as in Groom, suddenly becomes a divided highway named "Route 66". After passing a gas station and a former intersection with Wheeler County Road 15, the first intersection with this business loop is the unmarked State Highway Spur 556 (Spur 556), which is also a connecting road running underneath I-40, leading to the frontage roads along the westbound lanes, as well as the western terminus of the business loop. Unlike Groom, no eastbound onramp exists here, and the divided highway ends immediately after Spur 556 in order to become a four-lane undivided highway. Further into town, former US 66 gains the name of West 12th Street, and the only signalized intersection along the entire route is US 83 (Main Street) where the U-Drop Inn, listed in the National Register of Historic Places, can be found on the northeast corner. From there, the road is named East 12th Street. Commercial development along the road, which began four blocks west of US 83 at North Arizona Street, consist mainly of motels, restaurants, and local car culture oriented businesses, some of which focuses on the roads former status as US 66. The commercial strip ends after a dirt road named North Tennessee Street.

"Route 66" splits from East 12th Street at an intersection that's another connecting road to the eastbound offramp of exit 164. Westbound Bus. I-40-J then runs over the overpass above I-40 to turn right at the frontage road along the westbound lanes leading to the western beginning of the business loop. Eastbound Bus. I-40-J narrows down to a two-lane undivided highway before passing by a TxDOT construction and maintenance facility and then leaves the frontage road at the onramp to eastbound I-40, where it meets its terminus. The frontage roads along both sides of I-40 continue through three more interchanges before crossing the Texas–Oklahoma state line.

== Oklahoma ==
=== Erick ===
Interstate 40 Business
- Location: Erick, OK

Interstate 40 Business (I-40 Bus.) in Erick is a business loop of I-40 that is the first business route of I-40 in Oklahoma. It begins at exit 5 (Honeyfarm Drive) and runs south onto North 1720th Road until that street ends at a four-lane divided highway known as East 1240th Road (former US-66), where it turns east. The next intersection is State Highway 30 (SH-30), which overlaps I-40 Bus. from that point on. I-40 Bus./SH-30 ends as a divided highway at Williams Street and becomes Roger Miller Boulevard as it enters downtown Erick. The overlap with SH-30 ends at Sheb Wooley Avenue when SH-30 itself turns north. I-40 Bus. becomes a divided highway again east of North 1750th Road and continues east until the intersection with a dirt road named North 1770th Road, where it curves to the northeast. I-40 Bus. finally ends at a folded diamond interchange with I-40, known as exit 11.

=== Sayre ===
Interstate 40 Business
- Location: Sayre

Interstate 40 Business (I-40 Bus.) in Sayre is a business loop of I-40 that is the second business route of I-40 in Oklahoma. It runs north from exit 20, overlapping much of US-283 as a four-lane divided highway until the intersection with Greer Avenue, where it becomes a four-lane undivided highway. The sole major intersection downtown is West and East Main Streets, which are part of SH-152. Between Maple and Poplar avenues, I-40 Bus./US-283/former US-66 has a grade crossing with a former Rock Island Railroad line, just west of a historic depot. Further north, it passes by the First Baptist Church, as well as the Route 66 Farmer's Market. I-40 Bus. and historic US-66 leave that overlap across from the intersection with West Sayre Avenue. From there, it runs east-northeast until it reaches a diamond interchange with I-40 at exit 25. Beyond exit 25, the road continues as a jughandle frontage road, leading to East 1170th Road.

=== Elk City ===
Interstate 40 Business
- Location: Elk City

Interstate 40 Business (I-40 Bus.) in Elk City is a business loop of I-40 that is the third business route of I-40 in Oklahoma. It runs northeast along former US-66 from eastbound exit 32 and turns east after the beginning of an overlap with SH-6 that runs along the route until SH-6 turns south at North Main Street. From there, it snakes through the northeastern part of the city and, after the intersection with SH-34, finally terminates with I-40 at westbound exit 41.

Route description

The route begins at a left exit in a Y-interchange with I-40, which also serves as a connection to southbound SH-34. The first intersection along this route is BK 29, which leads to SH-34 and was the west end of an overlap with SH-34 until 1987. The road continues to run northeast, then, after encountering an intersection with SH-6, which joins I-40 Bus. in a concurrency, it turns straight east. Just after James Way, the divided highway is replaced by a four-lane undivided boulevard with center left turn provisions, and the road approaches the National Route 66 Museum. As the road approaches downtown Elk City, SH-6 turns south at the intersection with North Main Street.

Crossing a bridge over a tributary to Elk Creek, I-40 Bus. makes a sharp curve to the left and heads north at 3rd Street. Between BK 35 and Country Club Drive, the road not only turns to the east again, but also resumes its previous status as a divided highway. Here, it also passes by the Elk City Regional Business Airport. The approach to the intersection with SH-34 is a sign of the beginning of the end for I-40 Bus. because south of this intersection is an approach to a westbound on/eastbound off Y-interchange with I-40. Immediately after this intersection, I-40 Bus. ends at an eastbound on/westbound off Y-interchange with I-40.

Junction list

The entire route is in Beckham County.

Location	mi	km	Destinations	Notes
	0.00	0.00	I-40 west – Sayre	Western terminus; I-40 EB exit 32
			To SH-34 – Mangum	Access to I-40 east (I-40 WB exit 32)
Elk City			SH-6 north – Sweetwater	West end of SH-6 overlap
Elk City			SH-6 south (Main Street)	East end of SH-6 overlap
Elk City			SH-34 to I-40 west – Hammon, Woodward	I-40 EB exit 41 to SH-34
Elk City			I-40 east	Eastern terminus; I-40 WB exit 41
1.000 mi = 1.609 km; 1.000 km = 0.621 mi: Concurrency terminus

=== Clinton ===
Interstate 40 Business
- Location: Clinton

Interstate 40 Business (I-40 Bus.) in Clinton is a business loop of I-40 that is the fourth business route of I-40 in Oklahoma, running from exit 65 to exit 69, although only part of the route runs along former US-66.

Route description

The route begins at exit 65, which is an eastbound flyover with no reentry, and a westbound right-in/right-out configuration. It runs northeast along West Gary Boulevard, a four-lane divided highway with a grassy median, surrounded by commercial development, including Clinton High School, then the Oklahoma Route 66 Museum just south of the eastern terminus of SH-73, and, ironically, west of the original US-66. The divider becomes less prominent north of that intersection, briefly becoming nonexistent in some areas. The road runs parallel to a Burlington Northern and Santa Fe Railway line until it curves east before the intersection with North 15th Street and continues to run straight east throughout much of downtown. I-40 Bus. does not overlap any former segments of US-66 until 10th Street. With some exceptions, I-40 Bus. continues as a standard commercial strip. Those exceptions consist of historic looking buildings, such as the First Presbyterian Church on the southwest corner of North 7th Street and the former fire station on the northeast corner of North 6th Street.

City Hall can be found on the northwest intersection with US-183 (North 4th Street), as well as a second leg of former US-66. East of that intersection, the surroundings are slightly more industrial. At North 1st Street, the route crosses an abandoned railroad line that was paved in that street as the name is briefly changed to Choctaw Avenue, then crosses a nonabandoned former Kansas City, Mexico and Orient railroad line now run by the Farmrail and Grainbelt Railroads. Immediately after the intersection with South Glenn Smith Street, the road runs along the bridge over the Washita River, and the name is reverted to Gary Boulevard, where it becomes more rural. Curving around a former Rock Island Railroad line, the road becomes a divided highway with a wide grassy divider again, just before the entrance to the Clinton Indian Health Center, the headquarters of the Cheyenne and Arapaho Tribal Government and a branch of the Lucky Star Casino. The last intersection is North 2280th Street before I-40 Bus. ends at a Y-interchange with I-40 at exit 69.

=== Weatherford ===
Interstate 40 Business
- Location: Weatherford

Interstate 40 Business (I-40 Bus.) in Weatherford is a business loop of I-40 that is the fifth business route of I-40 in Oklahoma, running from exit 80A to exit 82, along parts of former US-66 and Main Street.

Route description

I-40 Bus. begins at an eastbound-only flyunder interchange and runs northeast along Southwest Main Street and runs beneath a railroad bridge for a former Chicago, Rock Island and Pacific Railroad line. Southwest Main Street ends at the southwest corner of the intersection of North and South 7th Streets and West Main Street and the route turns east onto West Main Street. West of this intersection, West Main has no designation but connects to SH-54. West Main Street becomes East Main Street at the intersection with North and South Custer Streets. East of Washington Avenue, I-40 Bus. curves to the northeast then turns right where it ends at another flyunder interchange, while historic US-66 continues onto East Main Street along the north side of I-40. Until sometime in the mid-2010s, this interchange was a trumpet interchange with no east- to westbound ramp.

=== El Reno ===
Interstate 40 Business
- Location: El Reno

Interstate 40 Business (I-40 Bus.) in El Reno is a business loop of I-40 that is the sixth business route of I-40 in Oklahoma, running from exit 119 to exit 125, along former US-66, as well as part of US-81.

Route description

I-40 Bus. begins at a trumpet interchange with I-40/US-270, running northeast as a divided highway until the intersection with East 1020th Drive, thereby joining historic US-66 and turning straight east along Sunset Road. After passing by the Federal Correctional Institution of El Reno, the divided road narrows as it enters more developed surroundings. Sunset Road curves to the southeast from Foreman Road and passes through Adams Park, only to curve back straight east before a bridge over the Four Mile Creek Riverbed and the intersection with South Country Club Road.

Between South Ellison Avenue and North Miles Avenue, I-40 Bus. runs beneath a railroad bridge for an old Chicago, Rock Island and Pacific Railroad line that runs northwest to southeast and is now owned by Union Pacific Railroad. Four blocks later, I-40 Bus. intersects US-81 (Chisholm Trail) at South Choctaw Avenue and joins the route in a southbound concurrency. For one block, I-40 Bus./US-81/historic US-66 run south to Wade Street, then the three routes run east for two blocks to Rock Island Avenue, only to turn south again. Rock Island Avenue carries all three routes straight south until the intersection with East Elm Street, where the road shifts to the south-southeast over a railroad bridge for another former Rock Island Railroad line. After this bridge, the road begins to curve more toward the east as it briefly intersects and takes over the alignment of Southeast 27th Street. I-40 Bus./US-81 avoids a sharp right turn onto South Shepherd Avenue through a long east-to-south turning ramp, but still intersects the western terminus of SH-66. Almost immediately, I-40 Bus. ends at exit 125 on I-40/US-270, which is an offset diamond interchange with one south-to-east loop ramp, while US-81 continues south toward Chickasha.

Junction list

The entire route is in Canadian County.

Location	mi	km	Destinations	Notes
	0.00	0.00	I-40 / US 270 – Amarillo, Oklahoma City	Western terminus; I-40 exit 119
El Reno			US 81 (Choctaw Avenue north)	West end of US-81 overlap
El Reno			Bridge over UP/AT&L connecting line	
El Reno			SH-66 east – Yukon	Western terminus of SH-66; former US-66 east
El Reno			I-40 (US 270) / US 81 south – Oklahoma City, Amarillo, Chickasha	Eastern terminus; I-40 exit 125; east end of US 81 overlap; highway continues as US-81 south
1.000 mi = 1.609 km; 1.000 km = 0.621 mi: Concurrency terminus

=== Henryetta ===
Interstate 40 Business
- Location: Henryetta

Interstate 40 Business (I-40 Bus.) in Henryetta is a business loop of I-40 that is the seventh business route of I-40 in Oklahoma, running from exit 237 to exit 240, along U.S Highway 62 Business (US-62 Bus.) and US-75 Bus., as well as part of US-62 and US-75. It is the first business route along I-40 in the state that is not a former segment of US-66.

Route description

I-40 Bus. begins at a diamond interchange with Creek Mine Road. Immediately after the westbound off- and onramps for I-40, the business routes all turn from north to east onto Hornbeam Road. Hornbeam Road runs east then curves to the northeast until it finally ends at West Main Street just west of 17th Street, curving smoothly into that street in the process. The routes run along West Main Street through the southern part of the city and eventually intersect the former SH-124 (10th Street) without a traffic signal. The only indication of that street's current importance are signs directing motorists to the Henryetta Municipal Airport and an RV Park. Traffic signals can instead be found at 6th, 5th, and 4th streets. After crossing the former Frisco Railroad tracks along with the abandoned Kansas, Oklahoma and Gulf Railway line, West Main Street becomes East Main Street at Lake Road, where the fourth traffic signal in town can be found. US-62 Bus./US-75 Bus. end at US-62/US-75, but I-40 Bus. turns south along this overlap until finally terminating at a cloverleaf interchange with I-40, which is also the northern terminus of the Indian Nation Turnpike.

=== Sallisaw ===
Interstate 40 Business
- Location: Sallisaw

Interstate 40 Business (I-40 Bus.) in Sallisaw is a business loop of I-40 that is the last business route of I-40 in Oklahoma, running from exit 308 (US-59) to exit 311 (US-64).

Route description

I-40 Bus. begins at a diamond interchange with I-40 at exit 308 and then turns north along US-59 (South Kerr Boulevard) as it passes under I-40. The road is a commercial strip that runs at a slight north-northwest angle and serves as a four-lane undivided highway with occasional provisions for left-turn lanes. South Kerr Boulevard curves slightly to the north-northeast where it ends at West Cherokee Avenue (US-64), and both I-40 Bus. and US-59 join US-64 along West Cherokee Avenue in a concurrency. The road narrows down to two lanes and runs beneath a Kansas City Southern Railroad line but emerges from beneath the bridge to enter "downtown" Sallisaw as a two-lane concrete road with parallel parking and run parallel to a former Missouri Pacific Railroad line, now owned by Union Pacific Railroad. The former MoPac Depot is now the Stanley Tubbs Memorial Library.

US-59 leaves the overlap at North Wheeler Avenue, and I-40 Bus. continues to follow US-64, along East Cherokee Avenue, which become a four-lane undivided highway before Wheeler Avenue. East of North Dogwood Street, I-40 Bus./US-64 curves to the southeast, away from the former MoPac line, and resumes as a standard contemporary commercial strip. Between Jenkins Street and Doris Drive, the road runs along a bridge over Hog Creek. I-40 Bus. ends at a partial cloverleaf interchange with I-40 known as exit 311, while US-64 continues toward the Sallisaw Sports Complex, Muldrow, and Moffett, where it crosses the J. Fred Patton Garrison Avenue Bridge over the Arkansas River and the Oklahoma–Arkansas state line.

== North Carolina ==
Interstate 40 Business
- Location: Winston-Salem, Kernersville, Colfax, Greensboro
- Existed: 1992–2020

Interstate 40 Business in North Carolina was established in 1992 when Interstate 40 was rerouted onto the mostly newly constructed stretch, south of Downtown Winston-Salem, with portions of the bypass utilizing a portion of US 311. The route followed the downtown and central areas of Winston-Salem, and then-considered south of central Kernersville. In November 2018, I-40 Bus. was closed around the downtown area of Winston-Salem for improvement. When construction was completed, I-40 Bus. was decommissioned, and the stretch that utilized the route, became named Salem Parkway. The numbered route that overlapped with I-40 Business, (US 421), became the primary route. Because of this, the I-40 Bus. exit numbers (exits 1–17) were replaced by the US 421 exit numbers (238–221). Construction was completed February 2, 2020.

Also in 2008, another I-40 Bus. was established in the city of Greensboro when I-40 was rerouted in areas, south most of the city. However, I-40 was rerouted through the city after a seven months on the new alignment, and US 421 now follows most of its former route.
