= Texas State Highway Loop 279 =

State highway in Texas

State Highway Loop 279

Route information
- Maintained by TxDOT
- Length: 4.049 mi (6.516 km)
- Existed: 1954–present

Major junctions
- West end: I-40 BL in Amarillo
- East end: US 87 in Amarillo

Location
- Country: United States
- State: Texas

Highway system
- Highways in Texas; Interstate; US; State; Former; Toll; Loops; Spurs; FM/RM; Park; Rec
← Spur 278	→ Spur 280

Loop 279, formerly Business U.S. Highway 66, is a state highway in Amarillo, Texas, United States. It runs from Amarillo Boulevard (Interstate 40 Business) and Bell Street east along 9th Avenue, Bushland Boulevard and 6th Avenue to end at Fillmore Street (northbound U.S. Route 87).

== Route description ==
Loop 279 begins at an intersection with Business Loop I-40 near Amarillo College in Amarillo, Potter County, heading east on SW 9th Avenue, a four-lane divided highway. The road soon becomes a five-lane road with a center left-turn lane as it passes through commercial areas before heading between the Amarillo Country Club to the north and residential areas to the south, losing the center turn lane. The highway turns northeast onto Bushland Boulevard at this point and continues south of the golf course. Loop 279 narrows into a two-lane road and heads past businesses, turning east onto SW 6th Avenue. The road heads through more commercial areas with some homes before heading into an area of more businesses. The highway heads into the commercial downtown of Amarillo, widening into a four-lane road. Here, Loop 279 crosses the southbound direction of US 287 before ending at the intersection of SE 6th Avenue and Fillmore Street (the northbound direction of US 87).

== History ==
The route was originally the main line of U.S. Route 66, which turned north on Fillmore Street (concurrent with US 87) to the current Business I-40. A new alignment along Amarillo Boulevard was built ca. 1953, and on May 25, 1954 the old alignment (west of Fillmore Street) was designated Loop 279 and signed as Business US 66 (Business US 66 continued north on Fillmore Street to new US 66). At some point, Fillmore Street became one-way northbound, and westbound Business US 66 was moved to either Taylor Street or Pierce Street. When US 66 was decommissioned in Texas in 1985, the Business US 66 designation was dropped.

== Junction list ==
The entire route is in Amarillo, Potter County.

mi	km	Destinations	Notes
0.000	0.000	SW 9th Avenue west	Continuation beyond BL I-40; serves Amarillo VA Health Care System
0.000	0.000	I-40 BL (Amarillo Boulevard)	Western terminus; former US 66
0.04	0.064	Bell Street south	Interchange
3.98	6.41	Taylor Street (US 287 south)	One-way street
4.049	6.516	Fillmore Street (US 87 north)	One-way street; eastern terminus; road continues as SE 6th Avenue
1.000 mi = 1.609 km; 1.000 km = 0.621 mi
