= Palo Duro Canyon State Park =

State park in Texas, United States

- IUCN category V (protected landscape/seascape)
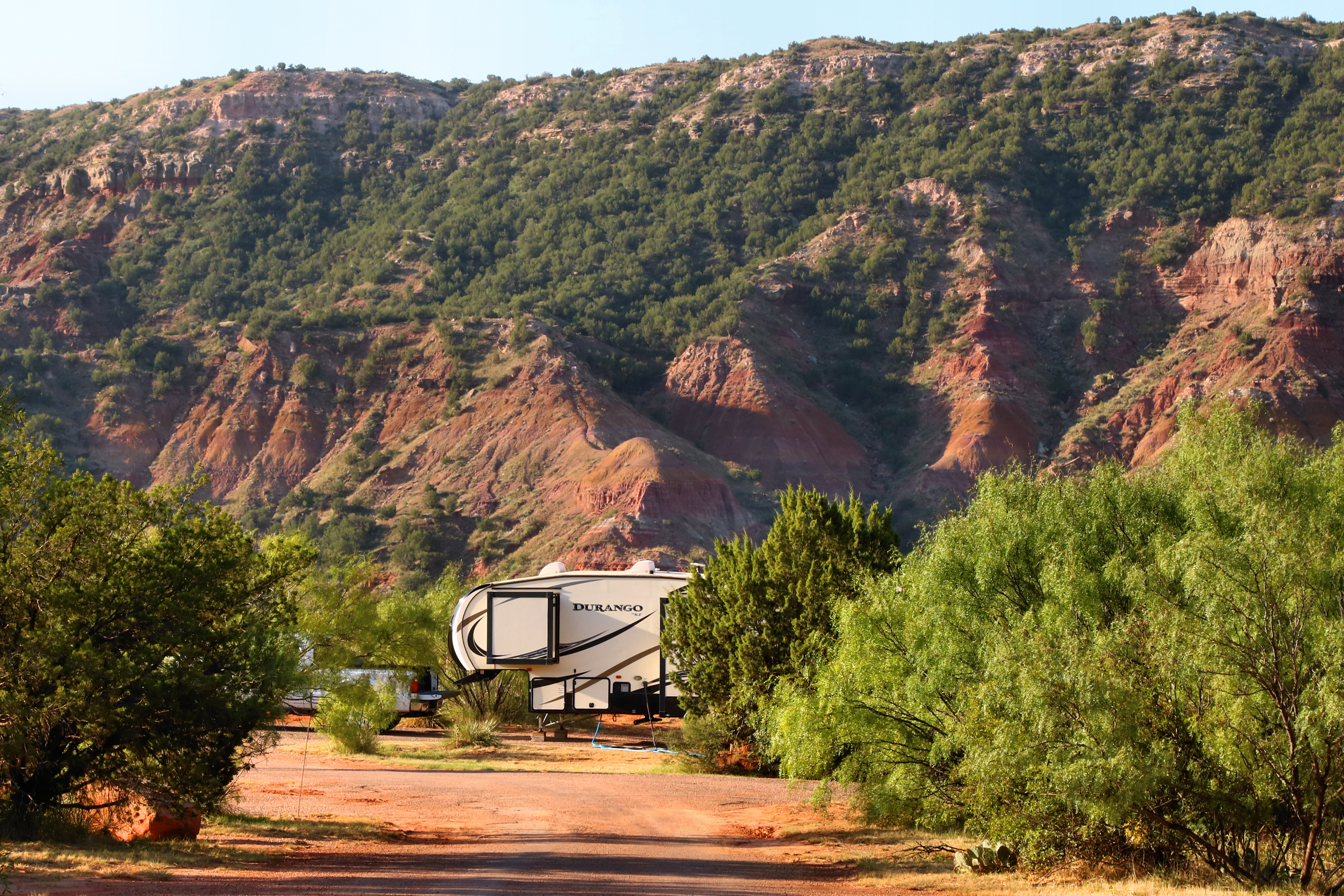
- A campground in Palo Duro Canyon State Park

- Location within Texas Location within the United States
- Location: Randall County and Armstrong County, Texas, United States
- Nearest city: Canyon
- Coordinates: 34°59′5″N 101°42′7″W
- Area: 28,000 acres (110 km^{2})
- Established: 1933
- Visitors: 373,945 (in 2025)
- Governing body: Texas Parks and Wildlife Department
- Website: Official site

Palo Duro Canyon State Park is a 28,000-acre (11,000 ha) state park in Randall and Armstrong counties, Texas, United States. The park opened in 1934 and is managed by the Texas Parks and Wildlife Department. The park is named for the Palo Duro Canyon which runs through it.

== History ==
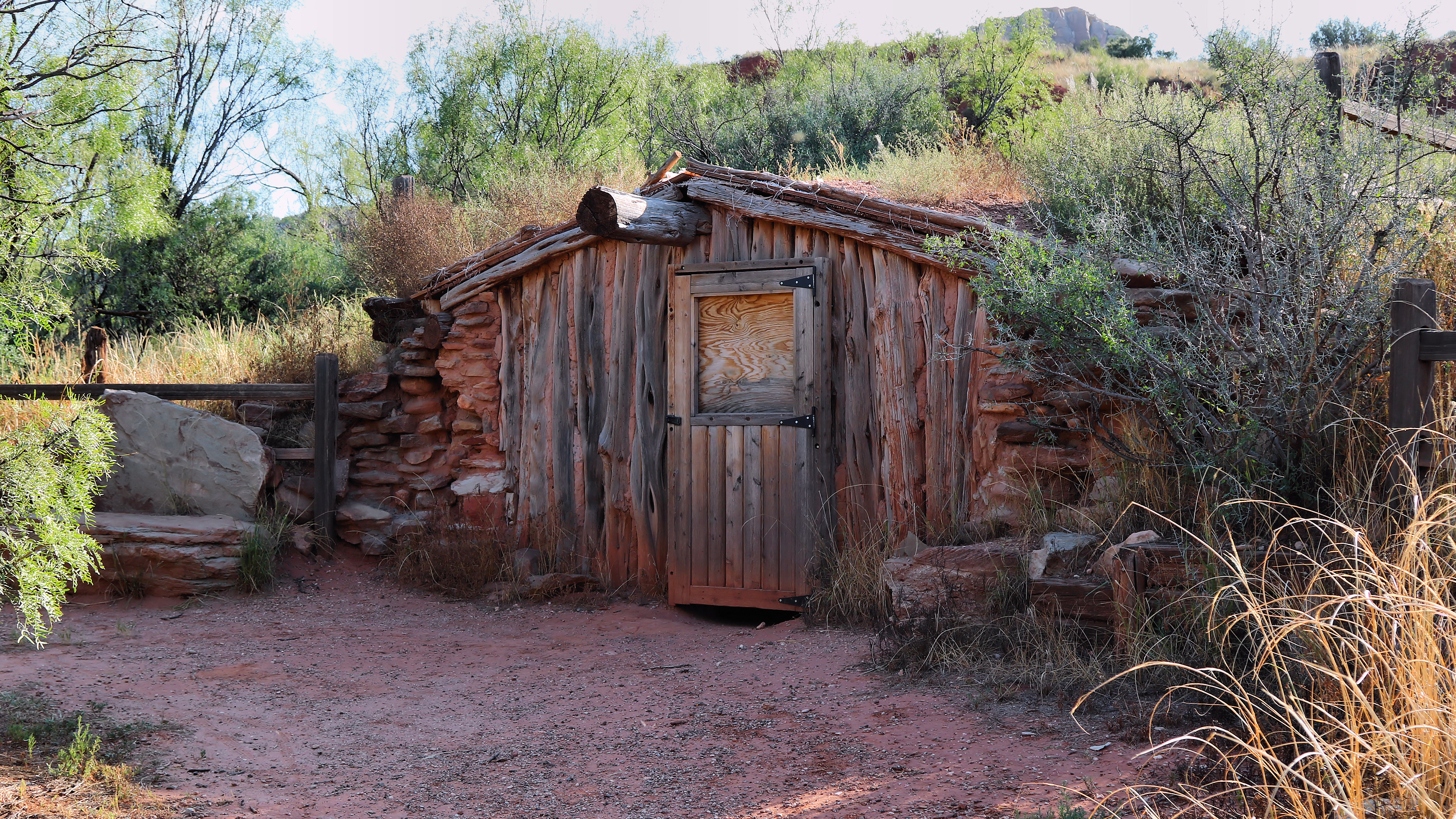
A dugout that provided shelter for cowboys on the frontier.

A United States military team under Captain Randolph B. Marcy mapped the canyon in 1852 during their search for the headwaters of the Red River. The land remained under American Indian control until a military expedition led by Colonel Ranald S. Mackenzie was sent in 1874 to remove the Indians to reservations in Oklahoma. The Mackenzie expedition captured about 1,200 of the Indians' horses and slaughtered them in nearby Tule Canyon during the Battle of Palo Duro Canyon. The Comanche and Kiowa conceded and left the area.

Soon after, in 1876, Charles Goodnight and a wealthy Ulster Scot named John Adair established the JA Ranch in Palo Duro Canyon. Col. Goodnight helped manage the ranch until 1890. Over the next half century, the canyon remained in private hands but was an increasingly popular tourist spot for residents.

Charles N. Gould made a geological map of the canyon and named the formations in 1905.

In 1931, a major landowner signed a two-year contract with the local chamber of commerce to allow public access to the canyon. The upper section of the canyon was purchased by the State of Texas in 1934 and turned into the 20,000-acre (8,100 ha) Palo Duro Canyon State Park. Amarillo is the largest city near Palo Duro Canyon State Park, but the smaller city of Canyon is nearer. In 1976, Palo Duro Canyon State Park was designated as a National Natural Landmark by the National Park Service.

=== Civilian Conservation Corps ===
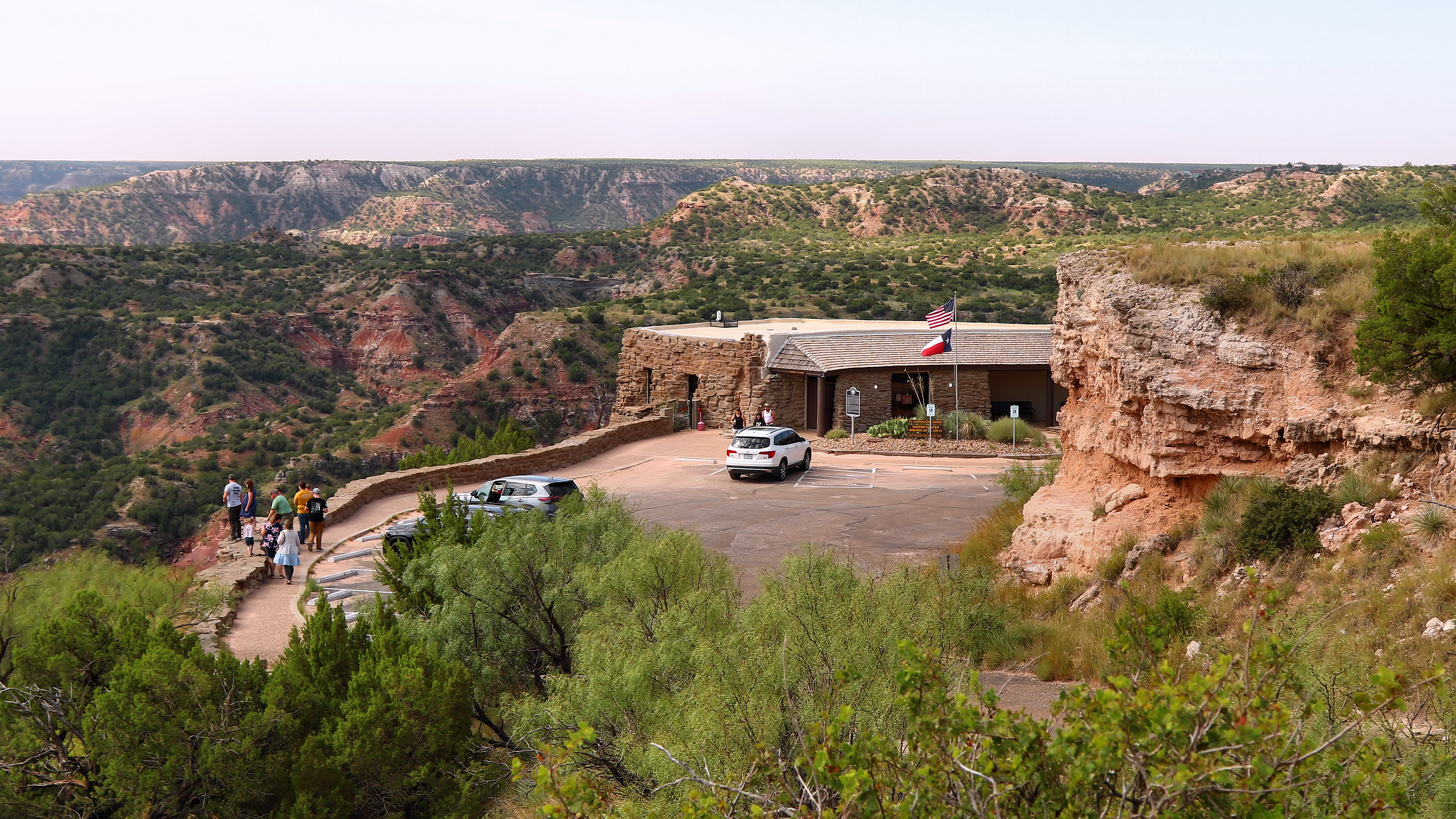
The CCC completed the visitor center in 1935.

Seven companies of the Civilian Conservation Corps (CCC) developed the park from 1933 until 1937. Companies 1821, 1823 and 1824 made up of military veterans, companies 2875 and 2876 made up of African Americans, and company 894, a junior group of young men 17 to 25, took part in various construction projects, starting with the construction of Park Road 5, a two-lane road from the rim to the floor of the canyon. The workers used dynamite to blast away difficult areas for the road, but most work was done with hand tools such as pickaxes, shovels and wheelbarrows.

Other CCC projects included the headquarters building, culverts, low-water crossings, bridges, Spring House, Well House, the El Coronado Lodge (now the visitor center), four overnight cabins known as Cow Camp, and the three rim cabins. In addition, picnic and camping areas were built, complete with tables, seats, fireplaces, and garbage receptacles.

== Activities ==
The Rim Rider opens the Texas outdoor musical.

Palo Duro Canyon hosts several activities throughout the park. There are 16 trails for hiking, cycling, and horseback riding, ranging in length from .05 miles to 4.4 miles. There are options for camping, with sites for tents with water access and RV campers alike. There are also sites for keeping horses available to campers planning to horseback ride in the canyon. In addition, lodging cabins are available for rent that sit on the outer rim of the canyon, providing an impressive view of both the canyon and the sunrise.

Group sites and spaces are available for group retreats, youth groups, and weddings. The Mack Dick Pavilion is a popular location for weddings and receptions, as the canyon provides a beautiful backdrop.

Palo Duro Canyon is the site of an outdoor historical and musical drama, titled Texas, presented annually each summer by actors, singers, dancers, and artists of the Texas Panhandle region. The spectacle, created by playwright Paul Eliot Green, premiered on July 1, 1966, at the newly constructed Pioneer Amphitheatre in Palo Duro Canyon State Park. It has continued each summer through the present, making Texas "the best-attended outdoor history drama in the nation."

== Nature ==
=== Animals ===
Two threatened species live in Palo Duro Canyon State Park, the Palo Duro mouse and the Texas horned lizard. Other animals include wild turkey, white-tailed deer, mule deer, coyote, and bobcat. A portion of the Texas State Longhorn Herd are kept here. Birds observed are golden-fronted woodpecker, Mississippi kite, Bullock's oriole, painted bunting, western meadowlark, lark sparrow and greater roadrunner. many species of snakes are found in the park including the venomous western diamond-backed rattlesnake.

=== Plants ===
Common trees in the canyon include redberry juniper, honey mesquite, eastern cottonwood, black willow, western soapberry and netleaf hackberry. Wildflowers and grasses are firewheel, American basketflower, common sunflower, blackfoot daisy, spiny goldenweed, sideoats grama, buffalograss, sand sagebrush, plains yucca and prickly pear cactus.

== See also ==
- List of Texas state parks
