= Samnorwood, Texas =

- Census-designated place
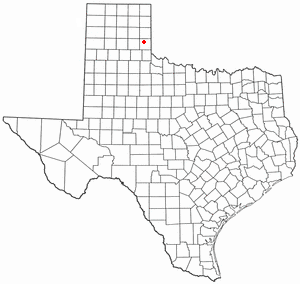
- Location of Samnorwood, Texas

- Coordinates: 35°03′00″N 100°16′53″W
- Country: United States
- State: Texas
- County: Collingsworth

Area
  - Total: 1.6 sq mi (4.2 km^{2})
  - Land: 1.6 sq mi (4.2 km^{2})
  - Water: 0 sq mi (0.0 km^{2})
- Elevation: 2,195 ft (669 m)

Population (2020)
  - Total: 24
  - Density: 15/sq mi (5.7/km^{2})
- Time zone: UTC-6 (Central (CST))
  - Summer (DST): UTC-5 (CDT)
- ZIP code: 79077
- Area code: 806
- FIPS code: 48-64448
- GNIS feature ID: 2409245

Samnorwood is a census-designated place (CDP) in Collingsworth County, Texas, United States. The population was 24 at the 2020 census, down from 51 at the 2010 census.

== Geography ==
Samnorwood is located in north-central Collingsworth County and is 16 miles (26 km) north of Wellington, the county seat, and 14 miles (23 km) south of Shamrock.

According to the United States Census Bureau, the Samnorwood CDP has a total area of 1.6 square miles (4.2 km^{2}), all land.

== Demographics ==
Historical population
Census	Pop.	Note	%±
2000	39		—
2010	51		30.8%
2020	24		−52.9%
U.S. Decennial Census; 1850–1900 1910; 1920 1930 1940; 1950 1960 1970; 1980 1990 2000; 2010

Samnorwood first appeared as a census designated place in the 2000 U.S. census.

=== 2020 census ===
Samnorwood CDP, Texas – Racial and ethnic composition Note: the US Census treats Hispanic/Latino as an ethnic category. This table excludes Latinos from the racial categories and assigns them to a separate category. Hispanics/Latinos may be of any race.
Race / Ethnicity (NH = Non-Hispanic)	Pop 2000	Pop 2010	Pop 2020	% 2000	% 2010	% 2020
White alone (NH)	29	50	18	74.36%	98.04%	75.00%
Black or African American alone (NH)	0	0	0	0.00%	0.00%	0.00%
Native American or Alaska Native alone (NH)	0	1	0	0.00%	1.96%	0.00%
Asian alone (NH)	0	0	0	0.00%	0.00%	0.00%
Native Hawaiian or Pacific Islander alone (NH)	0	0	0	0.00%	0.00%	0.00%
Other race alone (NH)	0	0	0	0.00%	0.00%	0.00%
Mixed race or Multiracial (NH)	0	0	2	0.00%	0.00%	8.33%
Hispanic or Latino (any race)	10	0	4	25.64%	0.00%	16.67%
Total	39	51	24	100.00%	100.00%	100.00%

=== 2000 census ===
As of the census of 2000, there were 39 people, 16 households, and 12 families residing in the CDP. The population density was 24.0 people per square mile (9.2/km^{2}). There were 20 housing units at an average density of 12.3/sq mi (4.7/km^{2}). The racial makeup of the CDP was 87.18% White, 5.13% African American, 7.69% from other races. Hispanic or Latino of any race were 25.64% of the population.

There were 16 households, out of which 31.3% had children under the age of 18 living with them, 56.3% were married couples living together, 18.8% had a female householder with no husband present, and 25.0% were non-families. 25.0% of all households were made up of individuals, and 12.5% had someone living alone who was 65 years of age or older. The average household size was 2.44 and the average family size was 2.92.

In the CDP, the population was spread out, with 20.5% under the age of 18, 15.4% from 18 to 24, 15.4% from 25 to 44, 25.6% from 45 to 64, and 23.1% who were 65 years of age or older. The median age was 45 years. For every 100 females, there were 105.3 males. For every 100 females age 18 and over, there were 106.7 males.

The median income for a household in the CDP was $38,750, and the median income for a family was $38,750. Males had a median income of $58,125 versus $40,417 for females. The per capita income for the CDP was $30,690. There were no families and 2.4% of the population living below the poverty line, including no under eighteens and none of those over 64.

== Education ==
Samnorwood is served by the Wellington Independent School District as of July 1, 2012. Prior to that date it was served by the Samnorwood Independent School District.
