= Route 66 Bridge over the Chicago, Rock Island and Gulf Railroad =

Historic bridge in Texas, US

- U.S. National Register of Historic Places
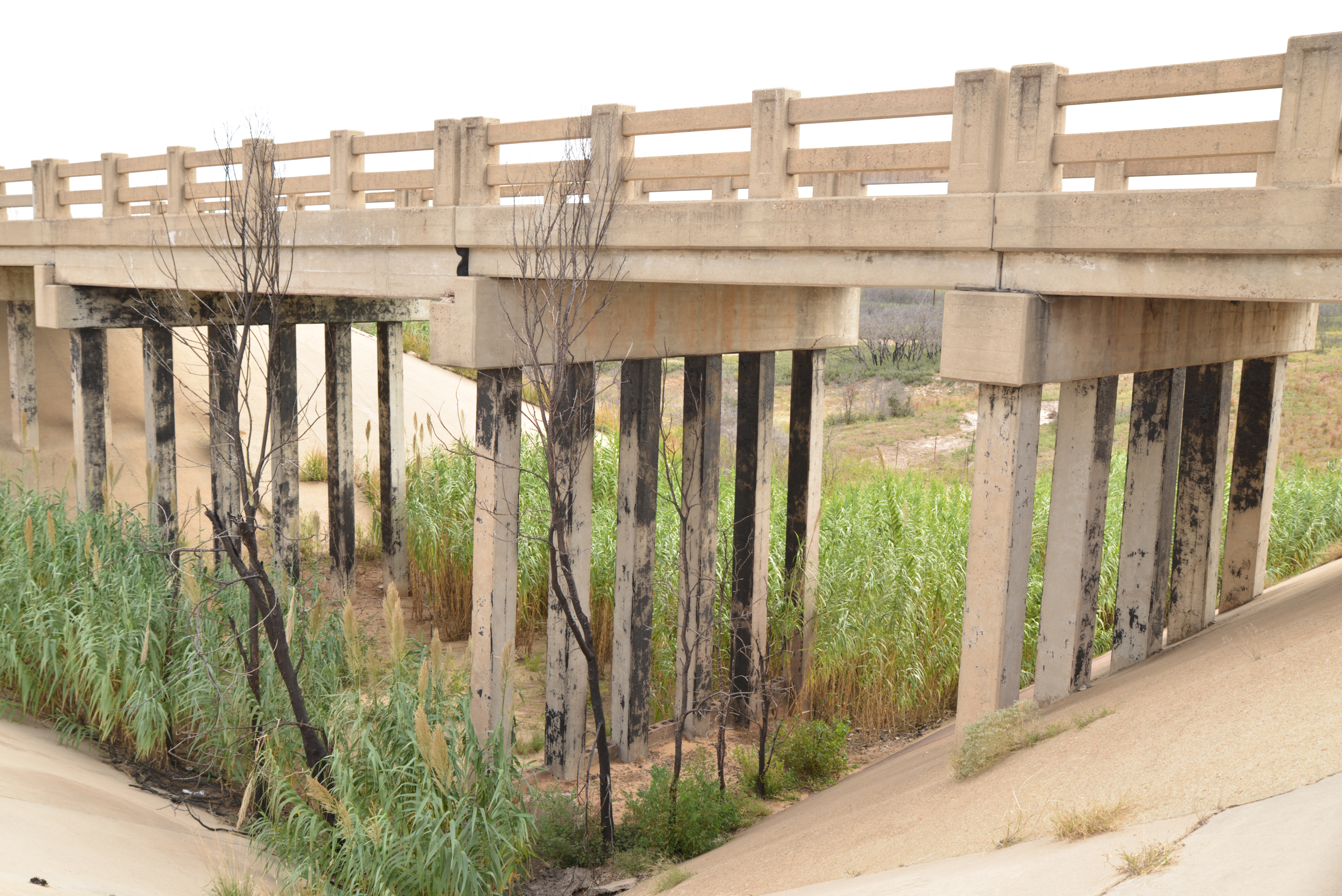
- Spans of the Route 66 bridge in 2018

- Location within Texas Location within the United States
- Nearest city: Shamrock, Texas
- Coordinates: 35°13′35″N 100°6′20″W
- Area: less than one acre
- Built: 1932
- Built by: E.T. Prater
- Engineer: M.L. Grady
- MPS: Route 66 in Texas MPS
- NRHP reference No.: 06000925
- Added to NRHP: April 3, 2007

The Route 66 Bridge over the Chicago, Rock Island and Gulf Railroad, in Wheeler County, Texas near Shamrock, Texas, was built in 1932. It carried Route 66 traffic until 1960. It now carries the south frontage road of Interstate 40 over the former Chicago, Rock Island and Gulf Railway right-of-way. It was listed on the National Register of Historic Places in 2007.

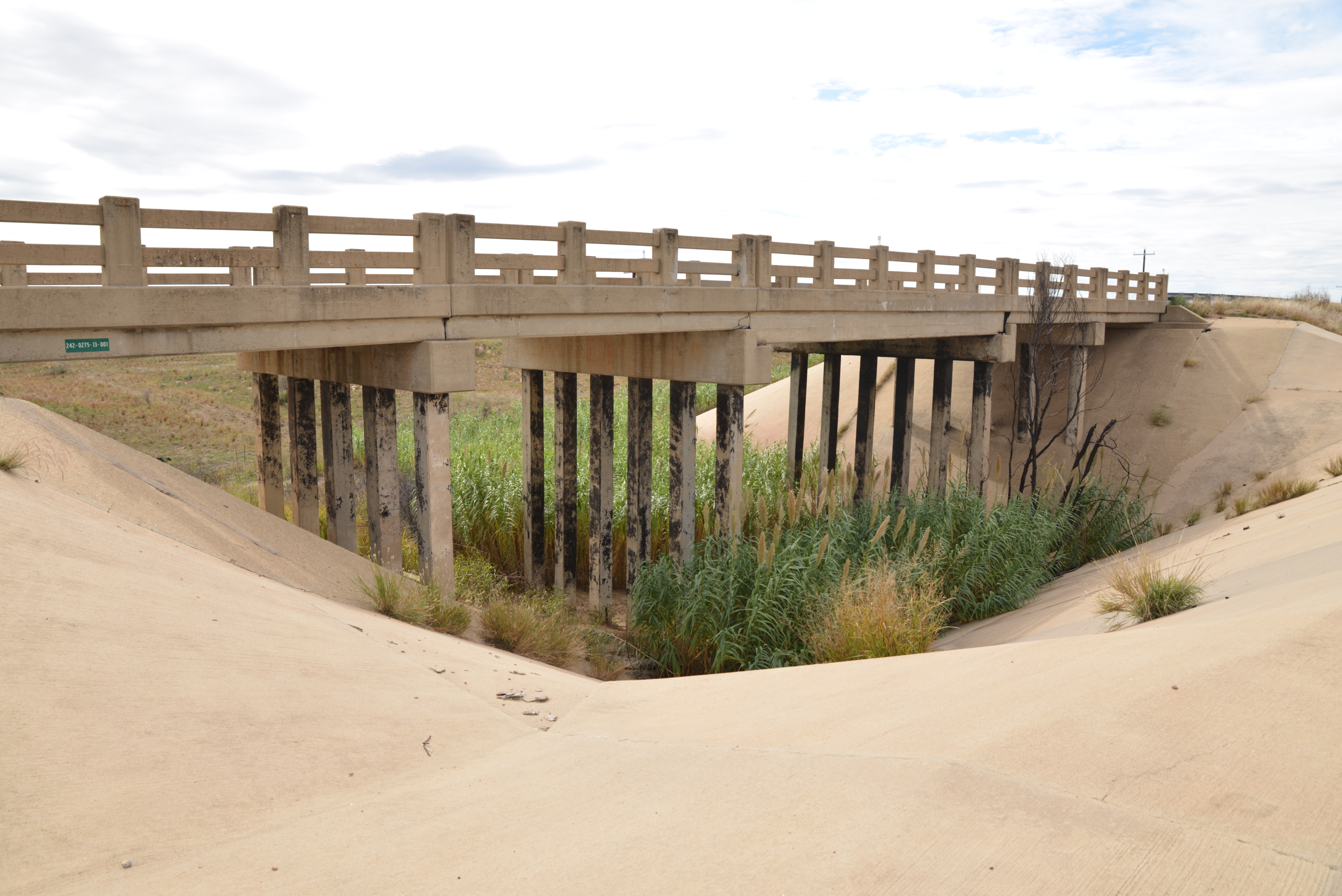
Five spans

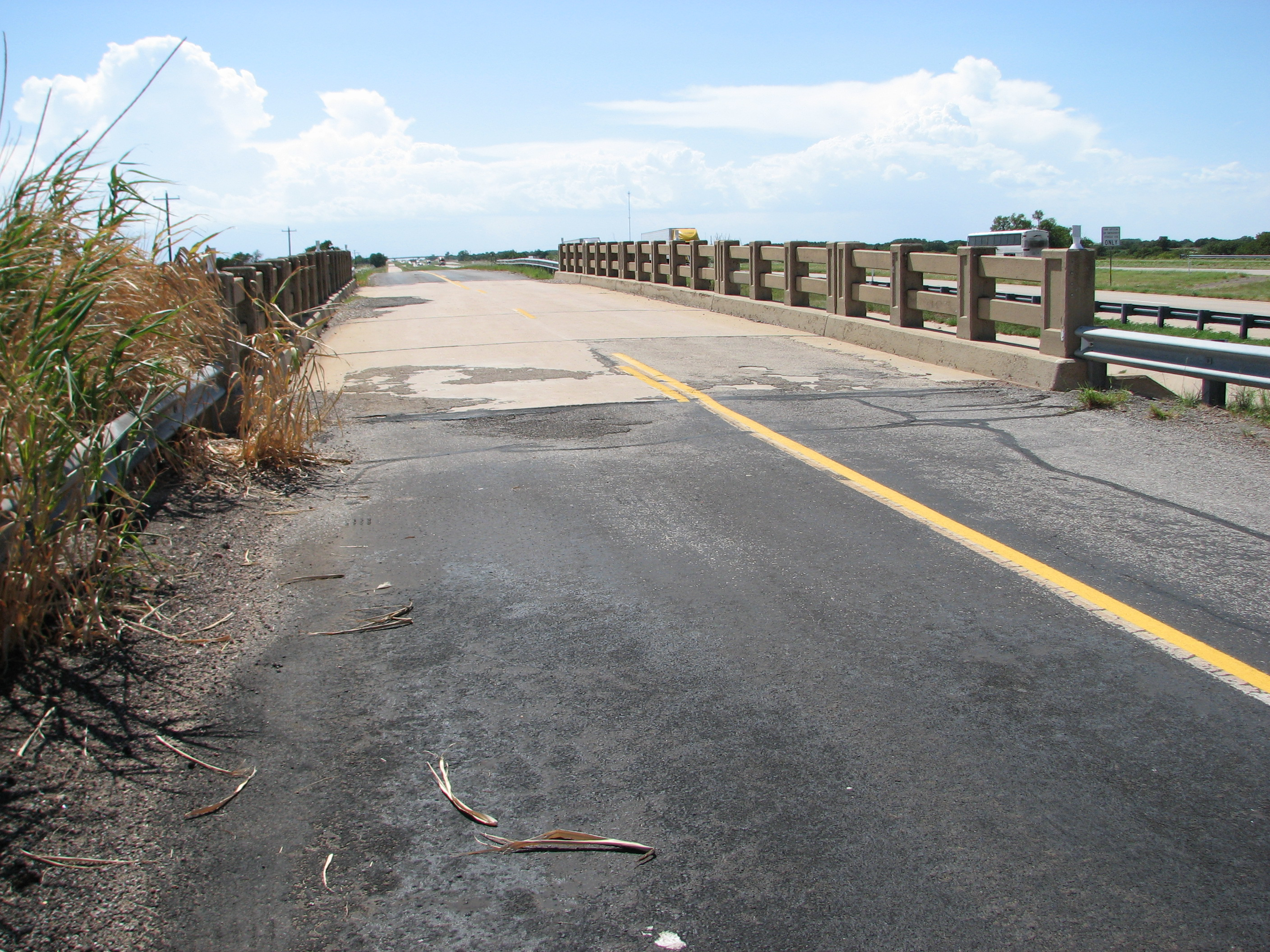
Deck, from the east

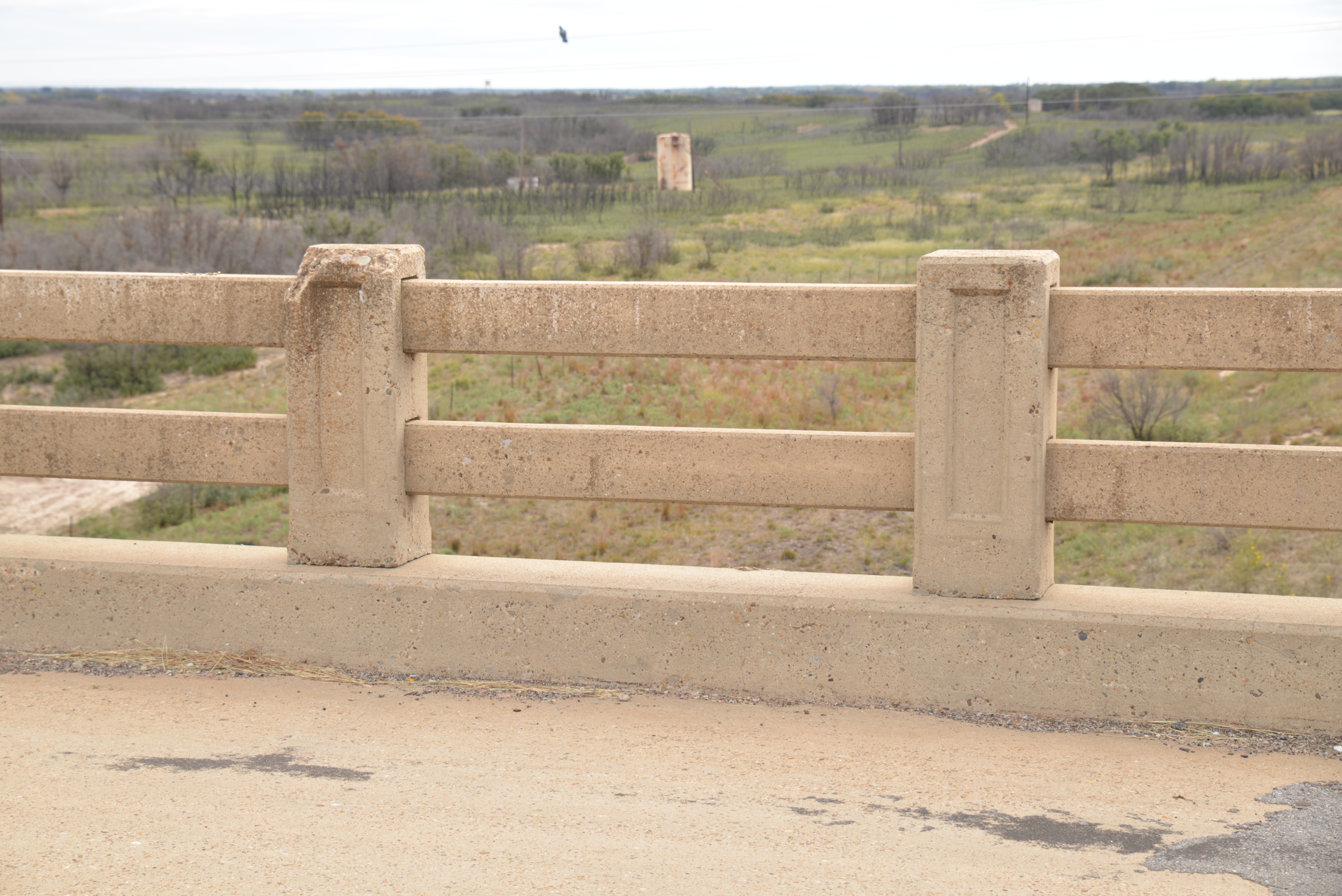

It is a five-span, steel and concrete bridge, 125 feet (38 m) long, with a 24 feet (7.3 m) wide roadway in a 27 feet (8.2 m) wide deck. Its main span is steel I-beams encased in concrete; the other spans are reinforced concrete girders supported by reinforced concrete pile bents.

== See also ==
- National Register of Historic Places listings in Wheeler County, Texas
- List of bridges on the National Register of Historic Places in Texas
