= National Register of Historic Places listings in Wheeler County, Texas =

Location of Wheeler County in Texas

This is a list of the National Register of Historic Places listings in Wheeler County, Texas.

This is intended to be a complete list of properties and districts listed on the National Register of Historic Places in Wheeler County, Texas. There are four properties listed on the National Register in the county. One property is also a Recorded Texas Historic Landmark.

This National Park Service list is complete through NPS recent listings posted March 21, 2025.

== Current listings ==
The locations of National Register properties may be seen in a mapping service provided.

	Name on the Register	Image	Date listed	Location	City or town	Description
1	Battle of Sweetwater Creek		August 13, 2001 (#01000876)	Address restricted	Mobeetie	
2	Route 66 Bridge over the Chicago, Rock Island and Gulf Railroad	Route 66 Bridge over the Chicago, Rock Island and Gulf Railroad	April 3, 2007 (#06000925)	I-40 south frontage road over the former CRI&G RR ROW; 35°13′35″N 100°06′20″W	Shamrock	
3	Route 66 in Wheeler County, Texas	Route 66 in Wheeler County, Texas	September 22, 2020 (#100005601)	South side frontage road of I 40 between Gray Co. (TX) and Beckham Co. (OK) lines. 35°13′35″N 100°17′24″W	Shamrock vicinity	
4	Tower Station	Tower Station	September 18, 1997 (#97001160)	101 E. 12th St. 35°13′36″N 100°14′55″W	Shamrock	Recorded Texas Historic Landmark, also called Tower Station

== See also ==
- National Register of Historic Places listings in Texas
- Recorded Texas Historic Landmarks in Wheeler County
