= Turnbow =

Turnbow is a surname. Notable people with the surname include:

- Derrick Turnbow (born 1978), American baseball player
- Donna Turnbow (born c. 1961), American artistic gymnast
- Guy Turnbow (1908–1975), American football player
- Hartman Turnbow (1905–1988), American civil rights figure
- Holice Turnbow (born 1930), American quilter
- Jesse Turnbow (1956–2018), American football player
- Kelsey Turnbow (born 1999), American footballer
