= Sweetwater Creek (Gray County, Texas) =

Stream in the American state of Missouri

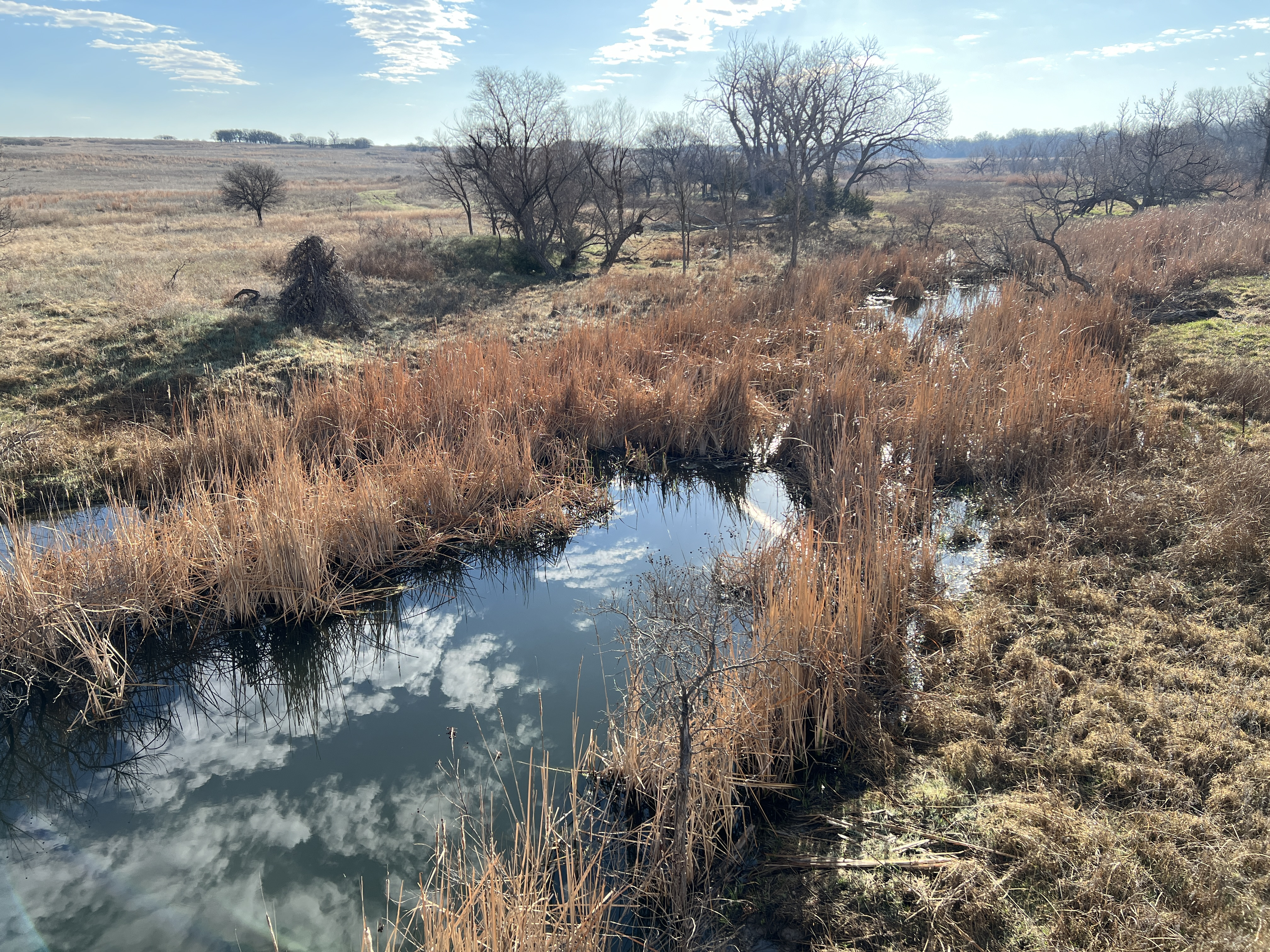
- Sweetwater Creek at US 83 crossing Wheeler County, Texas

Physical characteristics
- Source
  - location: Gray County, Texas
  - coordinates: 35.608387°N 100.599108°W
  - elevation: 3,025 ft (922 m)
- Mouth
  - location: Beckham County, Oklahoma
  - coordinates: 35.300833°N 99.946111°W
  - elevation: 1,978 ft (603 m)
- Length: 42 mi (68 km)

Basin features
- River system: Red River of the South

Sweetwater Creek is a spring-fed stream in the Texas Panhandle and western Oklahoma. It is a tributary of the North Fork Red River.

The stream headwaters arise in northern Gray County, Texas at 35°36′29″N 100°35′55″W northeast of Laketon and southeast of Miami at an elevation of 3010 feet. The stream flows southeast into Wheeler County southwest of Mobeetie and under Texas State Highway 152 and U.S. Route 83 and through the southwest corner Roger Mills County, Oklahoma, and into Beckham County, Oklahoma, southwest of Sweetwater, Oklahoma. The stream turns south and southwest to enter the North Fork Red River 2.5 miles from the Oklahoma-Texas line. The confluence is at 35°18′03″N 99°56′46″W and an elevation of 1978 ft. The confluence is 6.5 miles northwest of Erick, Oklahoma on I-40.

Sweetwater Creek is central to the range of the southern buffalo herd. Along its banks were located favored hunting camps of Plains tribes, such as the Comanche and Kiowa. The encroachment of American hide hunters at Sweetwater Creek was contested by the Comanche and their Kiowa allies. It figured in the Red River War of 1874, which was a campaign by the US Army to confine Native American tribes on the reservations to minimize conflict between the Americans and Native tribes.

Fort Elliott was located on the banks of Sweetwater Creek.

The town of Mobeetie, Texas, a Native American word meaning "sweet water", and Sweetwater, Oklahoma, are named for the creek.

== See also ==
- List of Oklahoma rivers
- List of Texas rivers
