= U-Drop Inn =

Historic gas station and cafe in Texas, US

- Tower Station
- U.S. National Register of Historic Places
- Recorded Texas Historic Landmark
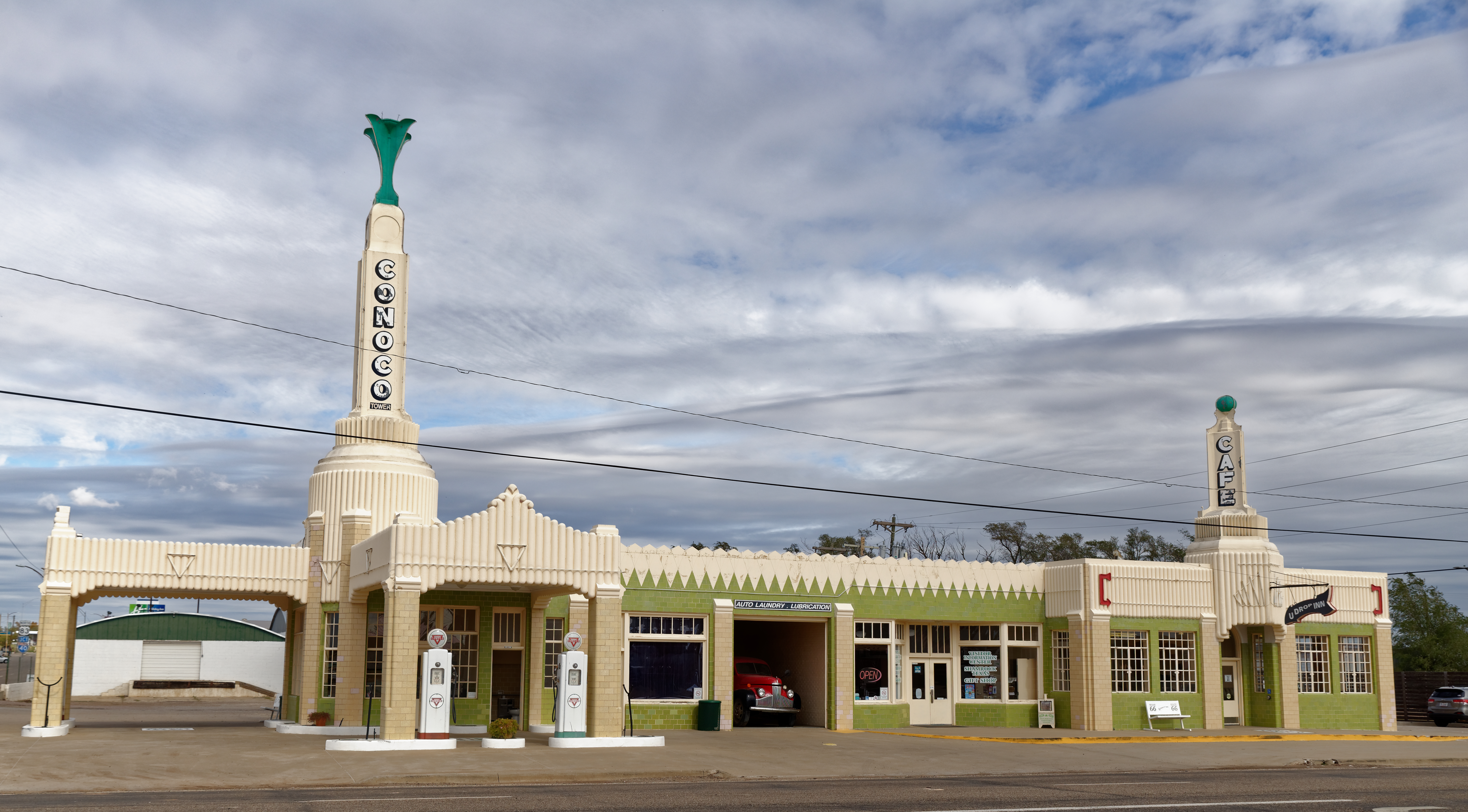
- The U-Drop Inn (2018)

- Location within Texas Location within the United States
- Location: 101 E. 12th Street, Shamrock, Wheeler County, Texas
- Coordinates: 35°13′36.23″N 100°14′55.49″W
- Area: less than one acre
- Built: 1936
- Architect: multiple
- Architectural style: Art Deco
- NRHP reference No.: 97001160
- RTHL No.: 5513

Significant dates
- Added to NRHP: September 18, 1997
- Designated RTHL: 1994

The U-Drop Inn, also known as Tower Station and U-Drop Inn and Tower Café, was built in 1936 in Shamrock, Texas along the historic Route 66 highway in Wheeler County. Inspired by the image of a nail stuck in soil, the building was designed by J. C. Berry. An unusual example of art deco architecture applied to a gas station and restaurant, the building features two flared towers with geometric detailing, curvilinear massing, glazed ceramic tile walls, and neon light accents. It has traditionally held two separate business: "Tower Station," a gas station on the western side, and the "U-Drop Inn," a café on the eastern side. Though it has passed hands several times in its history, the building has consistently housed the same types of businesses it was originally constructed for.

Once considered a beautiful and impressive example of Route 66 architecture in Texas, the U-Drop Inn fell into disrepair with the decommissioning of Route 66. It closed for business in the late 1990s. After it was listed on the National Register of Historic Places in September 1997, the building was purchased by the First National Bank of Shamrock, which then gave it to the city. Primarily funded by a US$1.7 million federal grant, the city hired a firm specializing in historical renovation to restore the building to its original glory and adapt it into a museum, visitors' center, gift shop, and the city's chamber of commerce. In the 2006 animated film Cars, the fictional town of Radiator Springs was based on multiple real U.S. Route 66 landmarks from Peach Springs to Baxter Springs; the U-Drop Inn's distinctive architecture appears as Ramone's automotive body and paint shop.

== History ==
=== Early days ===
Opened on April 1, 1936, the U-Drop Inn was built by J.M. Tindall using a design created by his friend, John Nunn, who scratched the design on a patch of dirt in the driveway of a nearby motel. Tindall had Pampa architect J.C. Berry draw up the blueprints for the art deco structure, and construction began at the busy intersection of Route 66 and U.S. Route 83. Nunn, whose family owned and ran the business, sponsored a contest to decide the name of the new building. An eight-year-old boy won a week's worth of waitressing pay (approximately $50.00 at the time) with his entry of "U-Drop Inn." In addition to a café, the building housed a gas station that sold Conoco brand fuel and a store. The store was never actually opened as a store, and became a ballroom and overflow dining area for the café.

When the business opened, the local newspaper called it "the most up-to-date edifice of its kind on U.S. Highway 66 between Oklahoma City and Amarillo," with the café considered "the swankiest of the swank eating places." At the time of opening, the U-Drop was the only café within 100 miles (160 km) of Shamrock, enjoying brisk business and becoming a successful establishment. Nunn sold the Inn after several years, but purchased it back in 1950 and renamed it Nunn's Café. In 1957, John Nunn died and his wife Bebe sold the café to Grace Brunner who again renamed it, this time to Tower Café, and added a Greyhound bus station.

=== Decline ===
After Nunn's death, the building passed through the hands of a few more owners and the station sold gasoline from various other companies. In the 1970s, Fina took over the building, painting it red, white, and blue. In the early 1980s, James R. Tindall, Sr. purchased the building, the construction of which his father had originally financed, repainted it to its original colors, and changed the name back to the original name of U-Drop Inn. In the mid-1990s, the building was repossessed by the bank and closed completely in 1997. Up through its closing, the café at the U-Drop was praised for its low-priced and tasty "home cooking".

With signing of the Federal Aid Highway Act of 1956, Route 66 fell into decline, with segments being bypassed via turnpikes and newer highways. With the opening of Interstate 40, Shamrock became one of the bypassed towns and the U-Drop Inn, which once served thousands of travelers fell into disrepair due to neglect. In 1984, Route 66 was decommissioned by the American Association of State Highway and Transportation Officials, seeming to seal the fate of the town and the U-Drop Inn. In 1990, several state and local historical associations began efforts to preserve the architectural landmarks along the old route, particularly the many derelict or abandoned motels.

=== Restoration ===
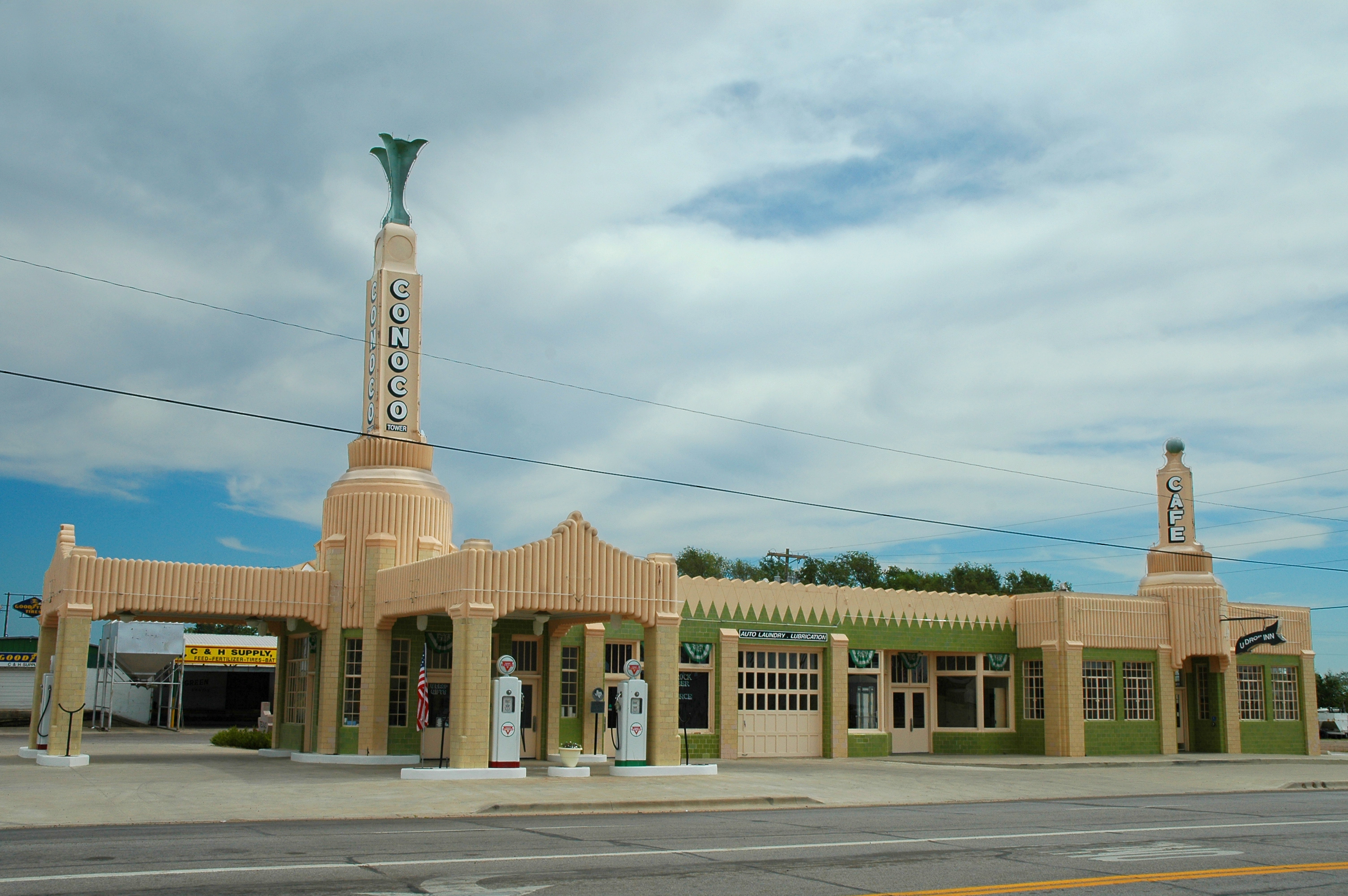
In 2006

Called "one of the most impressive examples" of Route 66 architecture by the Texas Historical Commission, the U-Drop Inn was added to the National Register of Historic Places on September 18, 1997. In May 1999, the First National Bank of Shamrock purchased the U-Drop Inn, then gave it to the city of Shamrock.

The city of Shamrock began taking measures to revive the neglected structure as a tourist attraction. In 2000, the city hired Phillips Swager Associates of Dallas and Architexas, a firm specializing in historical preservation, to begin implementing a phased restoration plan.

The company adapted the old gas station and café to act as the community's chamber of commerce and visitor center while preserving the building's architectural features and historical authenticity. Old photographs and interviews with residents were used to aid the company in uncovering the buildings original details. They peeled away decades of paint layers and fabric to find the original interior and exterior colors. One of the more difficult aspects was in restoring the neon accents. While historical photographs showed where neon existed, they had all been taken during the daytime when the neon lights were off, making it difficult to determine what color the lights originally were.

The restoration also included turning the building into a museum of its own history, giving it the authentic appearance of a working 1940 gas station. With $1.7 million in funding by the Transportation Equity Act for the 21st Century, the restoration was completed in July 2003.

In May 2013, the neon lighting of the restored U-Drop Inn was damaged by a hailstorm; the damaged elements were replaced by LEDs in February 2014. The café will serve fountain drinks, coffee and floats in 2014 after many years with no food or beverage service. The U Drop Inn cafe has opened with new ownership February 15, 2025 and offers a selection of classic American flavors with a side of Route 66 nostalgia. A favorite sitting area in the cafe is where the late Elvis Presley sat during his time here in Shamrock Texas.

== Architecture ==
With its glazed brick, "zigzag" motif, strong vertical elements, and the decorative structure, particularly the metal "tulip," the building is considered to be an excellent example of the Art Deco style. Art Deco was most commonly seen in large commercial and public buildings, so its use in a gas station and roadside restaurant was a rare sight. The U-Drop is one of the few Art Deco cafés built in the 1930s, and it stands out architecturally from its peers, as most depression-era cafés had simpler and similar wood-frame and clapboard designs or followed the Streamline Moderne offshoot of Art Deco.

The original building was designed by John Nunn and architect J. C. Berry. The 1-story concrete and brick building has a modified rectangular layout with a flat roof. It features a flared tower over the gas station, and two canopies, one facing Route 66 and one facing Highway 83 over the front of the gas station office. In the rear, a second, shorter tower contained the restaurant. The main buildings were built of structural clay tile with terra-cotta glazed brick. The two towers are clad in stucco with decorative green and gold glazed terra-cotta tiles and cast concrete stepped forms. Designed to attract the attention of the passing motorists, the towers also feature geometric detailing, curvilinear massing, and are outlined with neon lighting added additional character and uniqueness to the building's design.

Historically, the U-Drop Inn held two separate businesses that shared a single interior wall. The west side, commonly called "Tower Station" "is dominated by a large four-sided obelisk rising from the flat roof and topped by a metal "tulip." The tower displayed the station name, Conoco, in all capital letters on each side, with neon lighting on the corners. Vertical-rubbed detailing goes along the base of both towers, as well as two canopies that extend south and west from the western tower. The posts of the canopies were originally encased in decorative glazed tile and vintage metal signs. Between the canopy posts are fuel islands designed to hold three fuel pumps each. 1960s-vintage pumps are situated on the islands, with three on the western canopy and two on the southern. A chamfered corner separates the two canopies. Multiple-pane windows surround the glass doors of the office station, as well as dominating much of the southern side of the building. Situated between the office and the café are two service station bays with roll-up style overhead doors.

The east side of the building, commonly called the "U-Drop Inn café" has a similarly designed, three-sided, shorter version of the main tower. Mirroring the "Conoco" wording, it has "Café" written in the same green paint with drop shadowed lettering, and a small ornamental metal sphere perched at its top. Just below the tower, an outstretched metal and wooden sign, added in 1950, displays the name of the building and points towards the recessed entrance. This side mirrors the tiled detail found in the station side, and once had a neon "starburst" around the sign and entryway. Inside the café, the eastern and southern interior walls are lined with booths. The northern wall holds two small restrooms, with the kitchen once located in the northeastern corner. On the southern wall, a recessed doorway flanked by large single-paned windows led into the café's main dining room. The building's exterior is painted beige with dark green accents. On the northern facade, the original brick remains unpainted.

== In popular culture ==
Ramone's House of Body Art from the film Cars was inspired by the U-Drop Inn.

The 2006 Pixar animated film Cars is set in the cartoon village of Radiator Springs, which was created as a composite of real landmarks and personalities encountered by Pixar artists on multiple research trips on 1,200 miles (1,900 km) of the former U.S. Route 66. Among the buildings and structures based on Route 66 landmarks is a version of Tower Station. U-Drop Inn's unique design and architecture is portrayed as an automotive body shop owned by the character Ramone, a Chevrolet Impala lowrider.

== See also ==
- National Register of Historic Places listings in Wheeler County, Texas
- Recorded Texas Historic Landmarks in Wheeler County
