= Shamrock High School =

Location
- 100 South Illinois Street; Shamrock, Texas 79079-2434; United States; 35.212559°N 100.240685°W

Information
- School type: Public high school
- School district: Shamrock Independent School District
- Principal: Travis Breitschopf
- Teaching staff: 13.39 (FTE)
- Grades: 9-12
- Enrollment: 100 (2023-2024)
- Student to teacher ratio: 7.47
- Colors: Green & White
- Athletics conference: UIL Class 1A
- Mascot: Fighting Irish/Lady Irish
- Yearbook: Shamrock
- Website: Shamrock High School

Shamrock High School is a public high school located in Shamrock, Texas, U.S. and classified as a 2A school by the UIL. It is part of the Shamrock Independent School District located in south central Wheeler County. In 2015, the school was rated "Met Standard" by the Texas Education Agency.

== Athletics ==
The Shamrock Irish compete in these sports:

- Baseball
- Basketball
- Cross Country
- Football
- Golf
- Track and Field

=== State Titles ===
- Boys Golf -
  - 1958(1A), 1998(1A)
- Girls Golf -
  - 2006(1A)
- Girls Track -
  - 2002(1A), 2003(1A)
