= Heather Meyer =

American politician (born 1980)

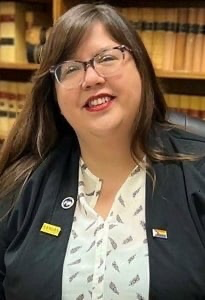
- State Representative Heather Meyer

Member of the Kansas House of Representatives from the 29th district
- Incumbent
- Assumed office September 7, 2021
- Preceded by: Brett Parker

Personal details
- Born: August 14, 1980 (age 46) Kansas City, Missouri, U.S.
- Party: Democratic
- Children: 2
- Education: Johnson County Community College (AA); University of Kansas (BSW, MSW)
- Website: Campaign website

Heather Meyer (McCormick) (born August 14, 1980) is an American politician, social worker, and mental health clinician serving as a member of the Kansas House of Representatives from the 29th district, in Overland Park, Kansas.

Meyer (McCormick) assumed office on September 7, 2021, after the resignation of her predecessor, Brett Parker.

== Political career ==
Meyer (McCormick) has served on the following House Committees during her tenure in the Kansas House of Representatives:

2021-2022: Water; Health & Human Services; Elections; Insurance

2022-2024: Ranking Minority Member-Welfare Reform; Water; Elections; Insurance

2025–Present: Ranking Minority Member—Federal & State Affairs; Health & Human Services; Elections; Insurance

Special Committees

2023 Special Committee on Homelessness

2024 Special Committee on Medical Marijuana

2026 Special Committee on Applications and Eligibility for Public Assistance Programs

== Early life and education ==
Meyer (McCormick) was born in Kansas City, Missouri and raised with her sister and stepsister in Olathe, Kansas by a single father with type 1 diabetes (Kevin McCormick), who passed away at age 47, and a disabled & deaf stepmother (Debra Price McCormick), who passed away at the age of 44.

At age 12, Meyer (McCormick) was also diagnosed with type 1 diabetes, and regularly rationed insulin with her father, which has driven her to advocate for Medicaid expansion and Medicare for All.

She graduated from Olathe North High School in 1998 and, as a non-traditional college student, went on to receive her Associate of Arts from Johnson County Community College in 2017. She earned both her Bachelor of Social Work and Master of Social Work from the University of Kansas.

== Personal life ==
Meyer (maiden name: McCormick) has two children and is divorced.

She is the first openly bisexual member of the Kansas Legislature.
