= Shamrock Independent School District =

School district in Texas

Shamrock Independent School District is a public school district based in Shamrock, Texas (USA). Located in Wheeler County, a small portion of the district extends into Collingsworth County.

On July 1, 1991, Lela Independent School District stopped operations, and Shamrock ISD, along with Samnorwood Independent School District, educated Lela ISD students until that district was formally merged into Shamrock ISD on July 1, 1992.

== Schools ==
Shamrock ISD has three campuses -

- Shamrock High School (Grades 9–12),
- Shamrock Middle School (Grades 6–8), and
- Shamrock Elementary School (Grades PK-5).

In 2009, the school district was rated "academically acceptable" by the Texas Education Agency.
