= Fort Elliott Consolidated Independent School District =

School district in Texas

Fort Elliott Consolidated Independent School District is a public school district based in the community of Briscoe, Texas (USA).

The district covers northern Wheeler County (including the city of Mobeetie and the community of Allison), southern Hemphill County, and a small portion of northeastern Gray County.

Fort Elliott Consolidated ISD has two schools that serve students in grades pre-kindergarten through twelve.

The district was created on August 10, 1991 by the consolidation of the Briscoe and Mobeetie districts, with the Allison Independent School District being added on July 1, 2003. Since the 2003 merger its area is about 500 square miles (1,300 km^{2}).

In 2009, the school district was rated "academically acceptable" by the Texas Education Agency.
