= Briscoe, Texas =

Unincorporated community in Texas, US

Coordinates: 35°35′01″N 100°17′23″W

Briscoe is an unincorporated community just east of U.S. Highway 83 in Wheeler County, Texas, United States.

The Fort Elliott Consolidated Independent School District serves area students. The former Briscoe Independent School District merged into the Fort Elliot CISD on August 10, 1991.
