= Sheryl Spalding =

American politician

Member of the Kansas House of Representatives from the 29th district
- In office January 8, 2007 – January 14, 2013
- Preceded by: Patricia Kilpatrick
- Succeeded by: James Todd

Personal details
- Born: October 19, 1948 (age 77)
- Party: Republican
- Spouse: Douglas
- Education: University of Cincinnati

Sheryl Spalding (October 19, 1948) is a Republican former member of the Kansas House of Representatives, who represented the 29th district. In 2012, redistricting placed her in the 8th district instead; she ran for election from that seat, but was defeated by Craig McPherson in the 2012 primary election.

Prior to her election, Spalding worked as a news journalist, and math teacher, and is now an education researcher at the University of Kansas. She received her bachelor's degree in secondary education from the University of Cincinnati.

Spalding has served as president of the Blue Valley Board of Education, special advocate for the Johnson County Court, regional VP for the Kansas Association of School Boards, and regional representative for the Kansas Association of School Board Legislative Committee.

== Committee membership ==
- Education
- Corrections and Juvenile Justice
- Government Efficiency and Fiscal Oversight

== Major donors ==
The top five donors to Spalding's 2008 campaign:

- 1. Kansas National Education Assoc. $750
- 2. Kansans for Lifesaving Cures $750
- 3. Kansas Medical Society $750
- 4. Heart PAC $500
- 5. Peterson, Mr. John $500
