= Kelton, Texas =

Unincorporated community in Texas, US

Coordinates: 35°24′03″N 100°06′46″W

Kelton is an unincorporated community in Wheeler County, Texas, United States.

The Kelton Independent School District serves area students.
