= Twitty, Texas =

Twitty
- Unincorporated community
- Location within the state of Texas Twitty (the United States)
- Coordinates: 35°18′50″N 100°14′10″W
- Country: United States
- State: Texas
- County: Wheeler
- Elevation: 2,251 ft (686 m)
- Time zone: UTC-6 (Central (CST))
  - Summer (DST): UTC-5 (CDT)
- ZIP codes: 79090
- GNIS feature ID: 1370382

Twitty is an unincorporated community in Wheeler County, Texas, United States. It was named after an early settler Asa Twitty.

It may have been the origin of the stage name of the country singer Conway Twitty. On the March 30, 1989, episode of Late Night with David Letterman, Conway Twitty stated that he chose his stage last name after seeing Twitty, Texas, on a map.
