= Jerry Williams (politician) =

American politician

Member of the Kansas House of Representatives from the 8th district
- In office January 8, 2001 – January 14, 2013
- Preceded by: Richard R. Reinhardt
- Succeeded by: Craig McPherson

Personal details
- Born: February 15, 1941 (age 85)
- Party: Democratic
- Spouse: Kathy
- Children: 5

Jerry D. Williams (February 15, 1941) is a Democratic member of the Kansas House of Representatives, representing the 8th district. He served from 2001 to 2013.

Prior to being elected, Williams served as a Chanute City Commissioner from 1986 to 1992 and a Neosho County Commissioner from 1992 to 1997. He has undergraduate and graduate degrees in education, along with a Master of Science in Gerontology. Williams has worked in a number of fields, including farming and ranching, teaching, and hospital administration.

Married to wife Kathy for over 40 years, they have five children and eight grandchildren.

== Committee membership ==
- Agriculture and Natural Resources Budget (Ranking Member)
- Transportation

== Major donors ==
The top 5 donors to Williams' 2008 campaign were all individuals:

- 1. Latham, Lance $500
- 2. Beachner, Eugene C $500
- 3. Slaughter, Jerry $500
- 4. Beachner, Eugene K $500
- 5. Robbins, Gary L $500
