= Allison Independent School District =

School district in Texas

Coordinates: 35.6193°N 100.1258°W

Allison Independent School District was a school district headquartered in Allison, Texas.

On July 1, 2003 it merged into the Fort Elliott Consolidated Independent School District.
