= Larry Salmans =

American politician (1937–2022)

Member of the Kansas Senate from the 37th district
- In office January 3, 1997 – 2004
- Preceded by: Jerry Moran
- Succeeded by: Dennis Wilson

Personal details
- Born: November 17, 1937 Shamrock, Texas
- Died: January 23, 2022 Waco Township, Sedgwick County, Kansas
- Party: Republican
- Spouse: Marilyn Miller
- Children: 5
- Education: Baylor University

Larry David Salmans (November 17, 1937 – January 23, 2022) was an American politician.

Salmans was born in Shamrock, Texas, and raised in Hanston, Kansas. He graduated from Baylor University with a double major in psychology and biology in 1960. Salmans served in the United States Air Force from 1960 until 1969. He worked in the bank business, farming, and as a forensic psychologist in Hanston, Kansas. He served on the local school board in Hanston, Kansas. Salmans then served in the Kansas Senate from 1997 to 2005 and was a Republican. He died in Waco, Texas.
