= Allison, Wheeler County, Texas =

Allison, Texas
- Census-designated place
- Location within Texas Location within the United States
- Coordinates: 35°36′43″N 100°06′42″W
- Country: United States
- State: Texas
- County: Wheeler
- Elevation: 2,589 ft (789 m)

Population (2020)
  - Total: 125
- Time zone: UTC-6 (Central (CST))
  - Summer (DST): UTC-5 (CDT)
- GNIS feature ID: 2805849

Allison is an unincorporated community and census-designated place (CDP) in northeastern Wheeler County, Texas, United States, at the junction of Texas Farm Roads 1046 and 277. Founded in 1929 as a stop for the Panhandle and Santa Fe Railway, the town was named for the general manager of the railroad, R. H. Allison. The Lone Star Townsite Company laid out the town. The town reached its height in population in 1941, just before the country entered World War II, at 200. It was first listed as a CDP in the 2020 census with a population of 125.

During the 1970s, Allison and the surrounding area benefited from the natural gas and oil development in the Panhandle-Hugoton field, the largest-volume gas field in the United States, and the world's largest known source of helium. Between 1973 and 1993, the field produced over 8 trillion ft^{3} (230,000,000 m^{3}) of gas.

For years, the Allison Independent School District served the community's students. In 2003, however, the district merged with the neighboring Fort Elliott Consolidated Independent School District.

== Climate ==
According to the Köppen climate classification, Allison has a semiarid climate, BSk on climate maps. Allison is in the eastern Texas Panhandle, which is in the western portions of Tornado Alley. A violent mile-wide tornado, F4 on the Fujita scale, narrowly missed the town during the tornado outbreak of June 8, 1995. The Allison tornado was documented by science teams associated with the first of two VORTEX projects.

== Demographics ==
Historical population
| Census | Pop. | Note | %± |
|---|---|---|---|
| 2020 | 125 | | — |
U.S. Decennial Census; 1850–1900 1910; 1920 1930 1940; 1950 1960 1970; 1980 1990 2000; 2010 2020

Allison was first listed as a census designated place in the 2020 U.S. census.

Allison CDP, Texas – Racial and ethnic composition Note: the US Census treats Hispanic/Latino as an ethnic category. This table excludes Latinos from the racial categories and assigns them to a separate category. Hispanics/Latinos may be of any race.
| Race / Ethnicity (NH = Non-Hispanic) | Pop 2020 | % 2020 |
|---|---|---|
| White alone (NH) | 117 | 93.60% |
| Black or African American alone (NH) | 0 | 0.00% |
| Native American or Alaska Native alone (NH) | 2 | 1.60% |
| Asian alone (NH) | 0 | 0.00% |
| Native Hawaiian or Pacific Islander alone (NH) | 0 | 0.00% |
| Other race alone (NH) | 0 | 0.00% |
| Mixed race or Multiracial (NH) | 1 | 0.80% |
| Hispanic or Latino (any race) | 5 | 4.00% |
| Total | 125 | 100.00% |

== Education ==
It is in the Fort Elliott Consolidated Independent School District

The Texas Legislature assigns all of Wheeler County to Clarendon College.
