= Wellington High School (Texas) =

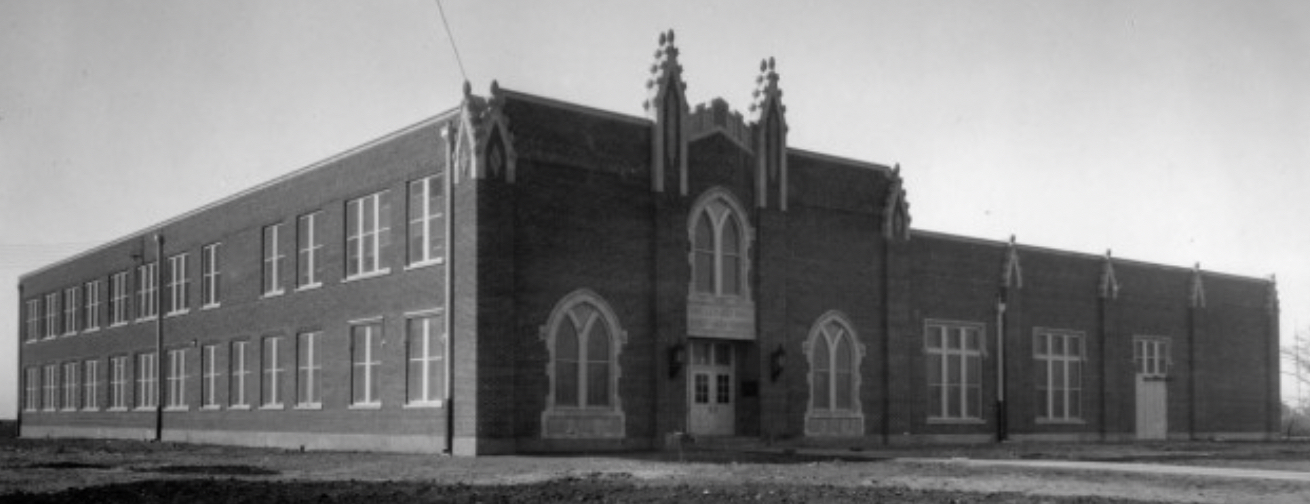
- Wellington High School in 1929

Location
- 811 15th Street; Wellington, Texas 79095; United States; 34°50′55″N 100°12′51″W

Information
- School type: Public high school
- School district: Wellington Independent School District
- Principal: Jermaine Cantu
- Grades: 9-12
- Enrollment: 164 (2023-2024)
- Colors: Red & White
- Athletics conference: UIL Class AA
- Mascot: Skyrockets/Lady Rockets
- Yearbook: Skyrocket
- Website: Wellington High School

Wellington High School is a public high school located in the city of Wellington, Texas, in Collingsworth County, United States and classified as a 2A school by the UIL. It is a part of the Wellington Independent School District located in south central Collingsworth County. The building was designed by Guy Anton Carlander. In 2015, the school was rated "Met Standard" by the Texas Education Agency.
