= Lela, Texas =

Coordinates: 35°13′39.18″N 100°20′34.44″W

Lela is an unincorporated community in Wheeler County, in the U.S state of Texas.

== History ==
Lela was originally called Lela when it was established in 1902. Lela had two post offices.
