= James Todd (Kansas politician) =

American politician

Member of the Kansas House of Representatives from the 29th district
- In office 2013–2016
- Preceded by: Sheryl Spalding
- Succeeded by: Brett Parker

Personal details
- Born: February 15, 1982 (age 44) Shawnee, Kansas, U.S.
- Party: Republican

James Eric Todd (born February 15, 1982) is an American politician who served in the Kansas House of Representatives as a Republican from the 29th district from 2013 to 2016. He was defeated in the 2016 general election by Democrat Brett Parker, losing by a 53–47 margin.
