= Patricia Barbieri-Lightner =

American politician

Member of the Kansas House of Representatives from the 29th district
- In office 1999–2004
- Preceded by: Dennis Wilson
- Succeeded by: Patricia Kilpatrick

Personal details
- Born: December 15, 1957 (age 68)
- Party: Republican

Patricia Barbieri-Lightner (born December 15, 1957) is an American politician who served in the Kansas House of Representatives as a Republican from the 29th district from 1999 to 2004. She was originally elected in the November 1998 elections, taking office in January 1999, and was re-elected twice. In 2004, she declined to run for re-election to the House, and instead ran for a seat in the U.S. House of Representatives; she lost the Republican primary election to Kris Kobach with 12% of the vote to Kobach's 44%, after raising comparatively little money for the race.
