= Patricia Kilpatrick =

American politician

Member of the Kansas House of Representatives from the 29th district
- In office 2005–2006
- Preceded by: Patricia Barbieri-Lightner
- Succeeded by: Sheryl Spalding

Personal details
- Born: February 12, 1969 (age 57) Key West, Florida
- Party: Republican
- Spouse: Nicholas Harms

Patricia Kilpatrick (born February 12, 1969) is an American politician who served in the Kansas House of Representatives as a Republican from the 29th district from 2005 to 2006. Kilpatrick won the 2004 Republican primary election by a six-point margin, and then had a more comfortable victory in the general election, winning with 66% of the vote. In 2006, she declined to run for re-election and was succeeded by fellow Republican Sheryl Spalding.
