= Craig McPherson (politician) =

American politician

Member of the Kansas House of Representatives from the 8th district
- In office January 14, 2013 – January 9, 2017
- Preceded by: Jerry Williams
- Succeeded by: Patty Markley

Personal details
- Born: March 26, 1984 (age 42)
- Party: Republican

Craig McPherson is a Republican member of the Kansas House of Representatives, representing the 8th district (Overland Park in Johnson County) since 2013, defeating Sheryl Spalding after redistricting.
