= Brett Parker =

American politician

Member of the Kansas House of Representatives from the 29th district
- In office January 9, 2017 – 2021
- Preceded by: James Todd
- Succeeded by: Heather Meyer

Personal details
- Party: Democratic
- Education: University of Missouri-Kansas City
- Website: www.BrettParkerforKansas.com

Brett Parker is an American politician who served in the Kansas House of Representatives from January 2017 to May 2021, representing the 29th District in Johnson County, Kansas. Parker was a teacher in Olathe Public Schools, and is a resident of Overland Park, Kansas.

Parker was raised in Olathe, Kansas, and is a graduate of the University of Missouri-Kansas City. He is a former vice president of the Olathe National Education Association.

== Political career ==
Parker was the Democratic Agenda Chairman in the House of Representatives and the Ranking Minority Member of the Calendar and Printing Committee and the Elections Committee. He was a former Ranking Minority Member of the Transportation and Public Safety Budget Committee.

In 2021, Parker resigned from the legislature to lead a political organizing group.

=== Committees ===
2019-2020 Kansas House of Representatives Committee Assignments

- Ranking Minority Member of Elections
- Ranking Minority Member of Calendar and Printing
- Appropriations
- Higher Education Budget (2019)
- Joint Committee on Pensions, Investments and Benefits

2017-2018 Kansas House of Representatives Committee Assignments

- Ranking Minority Member of Transportation and Public Safety Budget (March 2018 - January 2019)
- Elections
- Insurance
- Member of Transportation and Public Safety Budget (January 2017 - March 2018)
