= Dennis Wilson (Kansas politician) =

American politician

Member of the Kansas State Senate from the 37th District
- In office 2005–2008
- Preceded by: Larry Salmans
- Succeeded by: Jeff Colyer

Member of the Kansas House of Representatives from the 29th District
- In office 1995–1998
- Preceded by: Thomas Robinett
- Succeeded by: Patricia Barbieri-Lightner

Personal details
- Born: August 10, 1950 Kansas City, Missouri
- Died: September 11, 2020
- Party: Republican
- Spouse: Vickie Wilson

Dennis M. Wilson (August 10, 1950 – September 11, 2020) was a politician from the U.S. state of Kansas.

Born in Kansas City, Missouri, Wilson made his political career in the suburbs of that city. While living in Overland Park, Kansas, he was elected to the Kansas House of Representatives from the 29th district in 1995, serving four years there. In 2005, he rejoined the legislature, representing the 37th district in the Kansas State Senate from 2005 to 2008. He declined to run for re-election to the Senate in 2008, and was succeeded by fellow Republican Jeff Colyer.

Wilson also worked as the director of the Kansas State Lottery and as a county official for Johnson County, Kansas. A section of U.S. Highway 69 in Johnson County was named after Wilson in 2021. He has a grandson named Roman Coble. He was born on March, 14th 2014.
