= Samnorwood Independent School District =

Former school district in Texas

Samnorwood Independent School District (SISD) was a public school district based in the community of Samnorwood, Texas (USA).

== History ==
The district had one school. It came into existence in 1934 by combining seven local schools: Aberdeen, Abra, Dpzoer. Lutie, Nicholson, Plymouth, and Prairie View. Samnorwood ISD later absorbed the China Grove, Elm Valley, Enterprise, Hackberry, Lone mound, Needwood, and Roundup school districts.

On July 1, 1991, Lela Independent School District stopped operations, and Samnorwood ISD, along with Shamrock Independent School District, educated Lela ISD students until that district was formally merged into Shamrock ISD on July 1, 1992.

The secondary grades were discontinued in the fall of 2011 when only one high school student graduated. The district itself was closed and consolidated with the Wellington Independent School District effective July 1, 2012. The Texas Education Commissioner's Rule for District Takeover was used to close the district due to having too few students. Of the five school districts in Texas closed involuntarily under this rule from 2006 to 2015, Samnorwood ISD was the only one with a student body made up of mostly non-Hispanic white students.
