= Wellington Independent School District =

School district in Texas

Wellington Independent School District is a public school district based in Wellington, Texas (USA). Located in Collingsworth County, the district extends into a portion of Childress County. In 2009, the school district was rated "academically acceptable" by the Texas Education Agency.

On July 2, 2012 Samnorwood Independent School District was consolidated into Wellington ISD.

== Schools ==
- Wellington High School
- Wellington Junior High School
- Wellington Elementary School
