= Holice Turnbow =

American quilter (born 1930)

- Born: October 1, 1930 (age 95); Shamrock, Texas
- Known for: Quilting
- Movement: Quilt art

Holice Edward Turnbow (born October 1, 1930) is an American quilter, artist, and textile consultant. Since the early 1970s, Turnbow has curated, judged, and lectured at a multitude of quilting events throughout the United States and Canada. He is certified by the National Quilting Association as a judge and teacher. In 1988, he co-founded the Hoffman Challenge, a national quilting, clothing, and dolls contest featuring hundreds of participants. His design have been commissioned by Spartex, Inc., Stencil House, and Benartex, Inc.

== Early life, career ==
Turnbow was born in Shamrock, Texas, on October 1, 1930. He has three sisters, each of whom was also born in Shamrock, Texas. His sisters, Martha Turnbow Darr and Nancy Turnbow Simpson, are also a quilters. Holice began his quilting career in the early 1970s after he was asked to teach needlework and quilting for a county recreational program.

Turnbow first received national exposure in 1978, when he was asked by the West Virginia Department of Culture and History to consult on and organize a quilt show. The show was in conjunction with the U.S. Postal Service issuing a commemorative stamp that recognized quilting as a folk art. That same year, he also served on the planning committee for the First Continental Quilting Congress, which was held in Arlington, Virginia. After these two events, he was invited to teach and lecture at numerous quilting events across the United States and Canada.

=== Judging ===
Turnbow is a quilt judge and teacher certified by the National Quilting Association. He has been a judicial fixture in a multitude of quilting and craft events since the 1980s. In 1988, Turnbow and Betty Boyink founded and curated the Hoffman Challenge, a national contest of quilted wall hangings, clothing, and dolls. The event, which started out with 94 quilters, has since grown to regularly over 700 participants. Turnbow and Boyink curated the event until 1998.

=== Exhibits ===
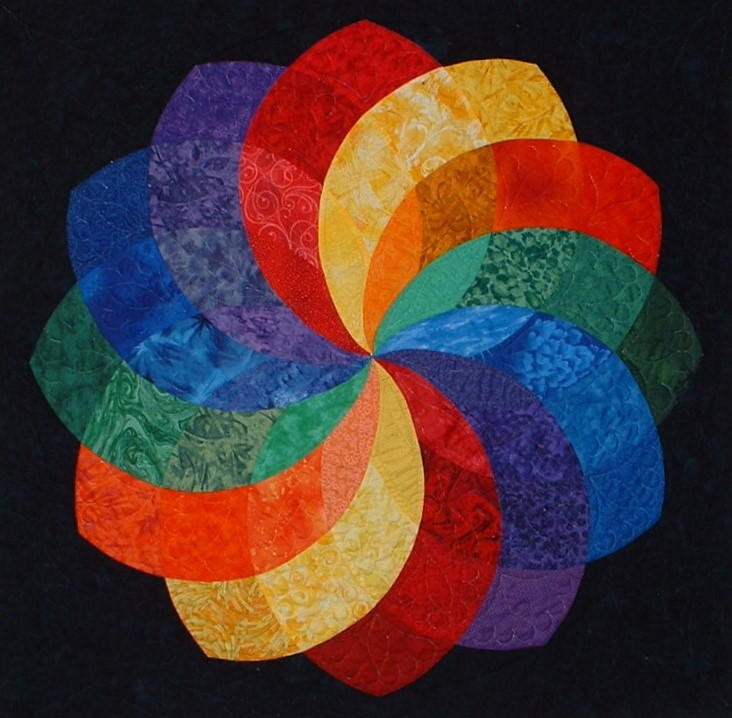
A Turnbow quilt titled "Rainbow Dalia"

Turnbow has designed and made garments for two invitational exhibits; "Statements", which was sponsored by P and B Fabrics, and the Fairfield Fashion Show." He has designed and made quilts for a multitude of special exhibits and challenges, as well, including the exhibit "Men of Biblical Proportions".

=== Stencils ===
In 1992, Turnbow was asked by Spartex, Inc., a South Carolina fabric company, to develop and design whole cloth patterns to be printed onto fabric. Included in Turnbow's designs was a series based on quilts from the National Museum of American History at the Smithsonian Institution in Washington DC.

Afterwards, he served as a quilt consultant to various textile and fabric companies, including the Canadian company Stencil House and the thread company Talon, Inc. He also provided further designs, including whole cloth quilts, to companies such as the New York fabric company Benartex, Inc. and the Stencil Company. His stencils are also re-published by various merchants online.

=== Teaching ===
Turnbow continues to teach quilting techniques, both hand and machine, to quilting groups, quilt shops, and national conventions across the United States. In addition to teaching regularly for local quilt shops, guilds, and conventions, he was a regular faculty member for the Original Sewing and Quilting Expo which conducted sewing and quilting events eight times a year.

== Media presence ==
Turnbow has written regularly for various quilting magazines. He has been featured on Quilters TV, and appeared on Kay Wood's Strip Quilting with Kaye and Quilting for the '90s. He also represented the Stencil Company in six shows on QNN, and in 2006 was named QNN's "Designer of the Month for July." He has appeared in 13 segments of the television series Heirlooms by Design, which was shown through the CBS network. He has recently completed the quilting series Quilt as Desired for QuiltersTV, which began showing on the internet in late April 2011. This was the third time he provided instructional videos for the site. The series is sponsored by the Stencil Company. He was also featured in the book Men and the Art of Quiltmaking by Joe Cunningham, published by the American Quilter's Society.

== Selected judiciary events ==
- "Central Oklahoma Quilters Guild Show"
- Northern Quilters Watertown, NY
- "Charlton Sewing Center EQ16 Challenge"
- Plano, Texas Quilters Guild
- Machine Quilters on the Waterfront – Duluth, MN
- "Machine Quilters Showcase" - twice
- "Pennsylvania National Show"
- Blue Ridge, VA Quilters Guild - twice
- "Rose Hill Manor Quilt Show" - Hagerstown, Maryland, twice
- Western Maryland Quilt Guild - thrice
- "Jackson Mills Annual Show" - West Virginia
- Southern Maryland Quilters Guild
- "New Jersey State Guild Show"
- "Lowell Quilt Festival" - Lowell, MA (180 quilts)
- "Narragansett Bay Quilters Show" - East Greenwich, RI (165 quilts)

== Personal life ==
Turnbow currently lives in Sturbridge, Massachusetts.
