= Chicago, Rock Island and Gulf Railway =

Texas railroad

The Chicago, Rock Island and Gulf Railway was a Texas subsidiary of the Chicago, Rock Island and Pacific Railroad.

The railroad was chartered in 1902 with intention to construct a railway from Fort Worth, Texas, to Galveston, Texas.

== See also ==
- Route 66 Bridge over the Chicago, Rock Island and Gulf Railroad
