= Kelton Independent School District =

School district in Texas

Kelton Independent School District is a public school district based in the community of Kelton, Texas (USA).

The district covers approximately 134 square miles and has one school that serves students in grades pre-kindergarten (Pre-K) through twelfth.

In 2009, the school district was rated "recognized" by the Texas Education Agency.

The district changed to a four day school week in fall 2020.
