= Shamrock, Texas =

City in the United States

- City
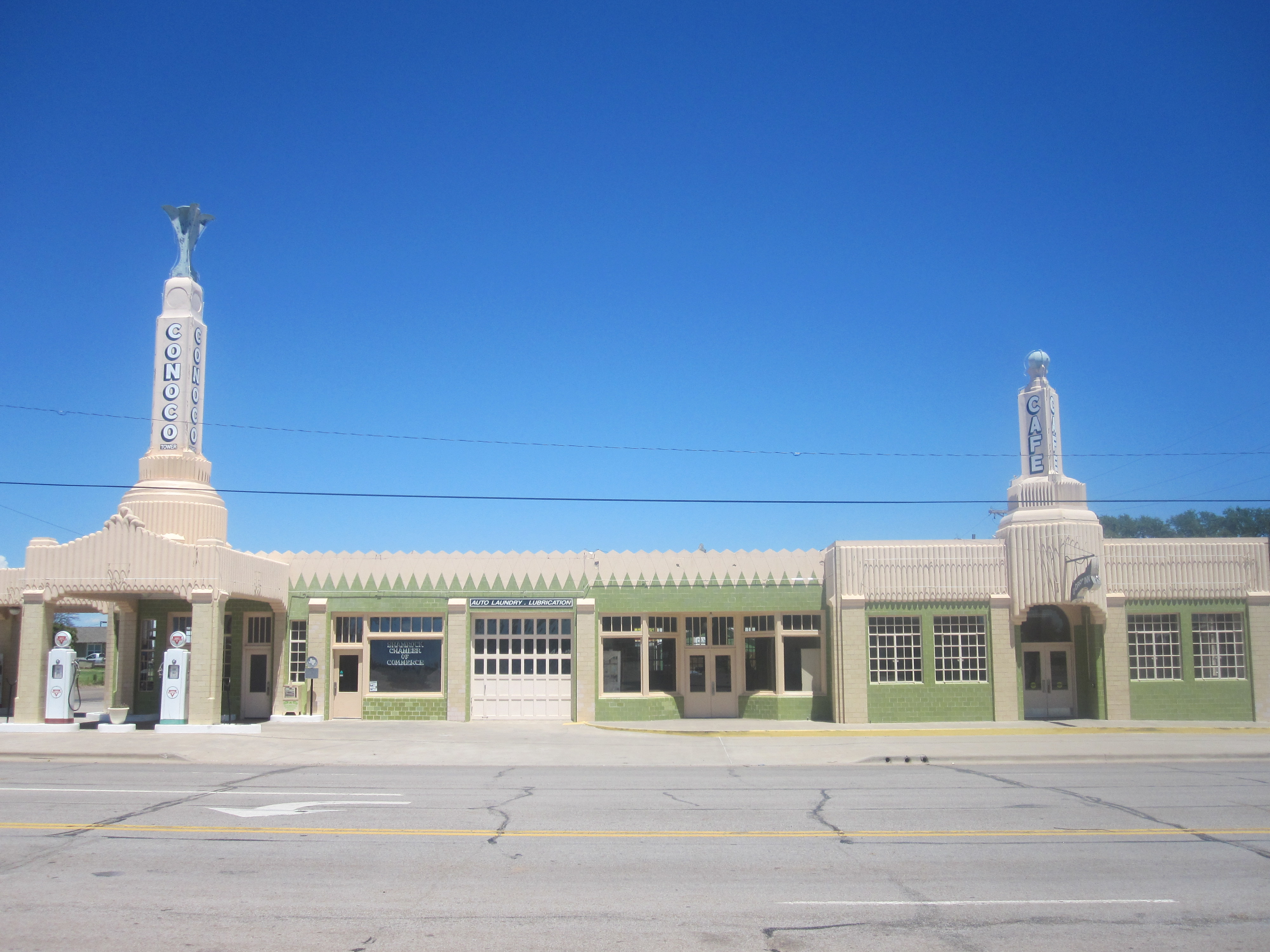
- Historic U-Drop Inn, a Conoco fuel station restoration in Art Deco style along U.S. Route 66 in Shamrock

- Location in Wheeler County and the state of Texas.
- Coordinates: 35°13′02″N 100°14′50″W
- Country: United States
- State: Texas
- County: Wheeler
- First Settled: 1890
- Incorporated: 1911

Area
  - Total: 2.05 sq mi (5.30 km^{2})
  - Land: 2.05 sq mi (5.30 km^{2})
  - Water: 0 sq mi (0.00 km^{2})
- Elevation: 2,333 ft (711 m)

Population (2020)
  - Total: 1,789
- Time zone: UTC-6 (Central (CST))
  - Summer (DST): UTC-5 (CDT)
- ZIP code: 79079
- Area code: 806
- FIPS code: 48-67160
- GNIS feature ID: 2411875
- Website: shamrocktx.org

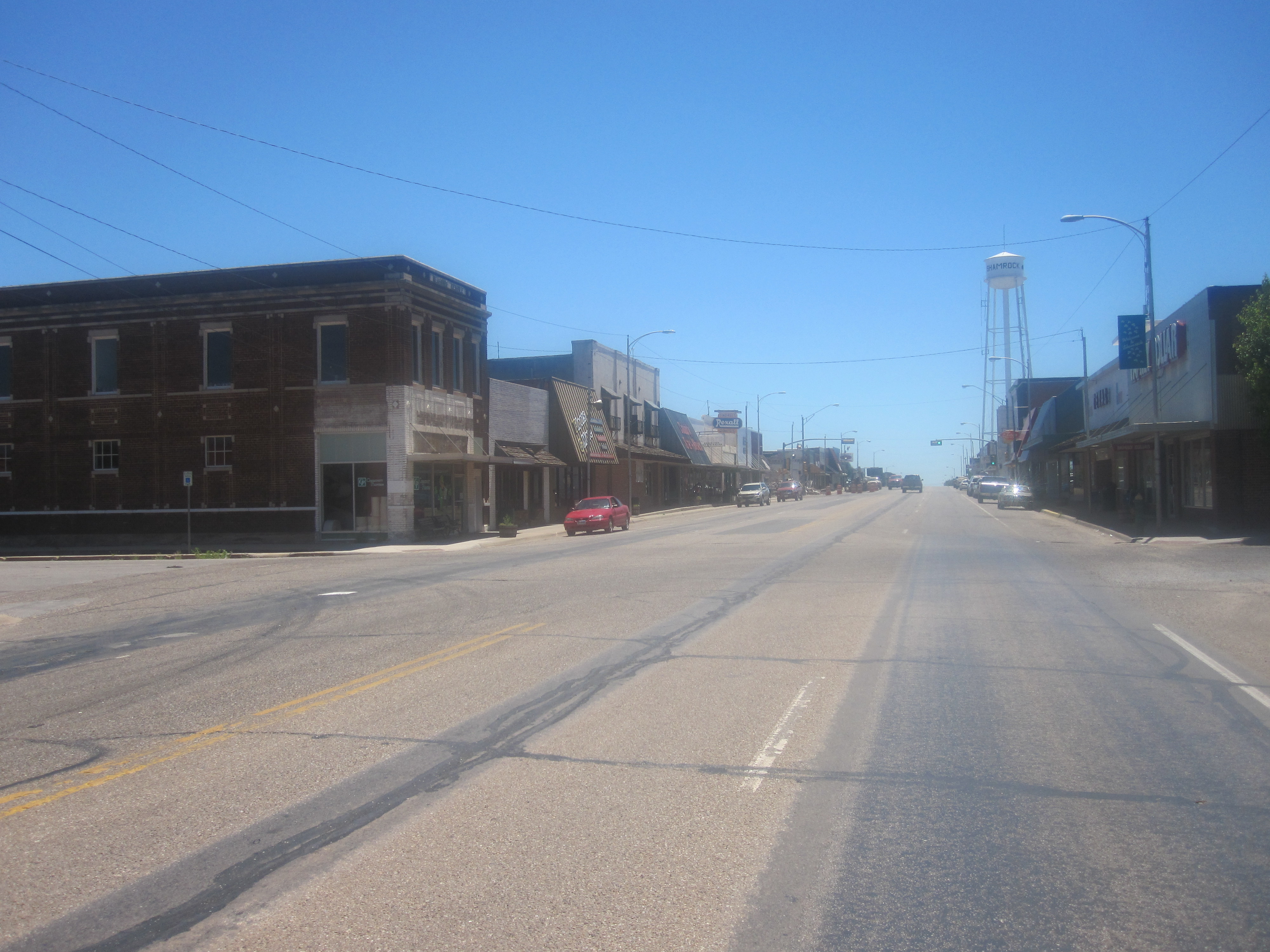
Downtown Shamrock on U.S. Highway 83

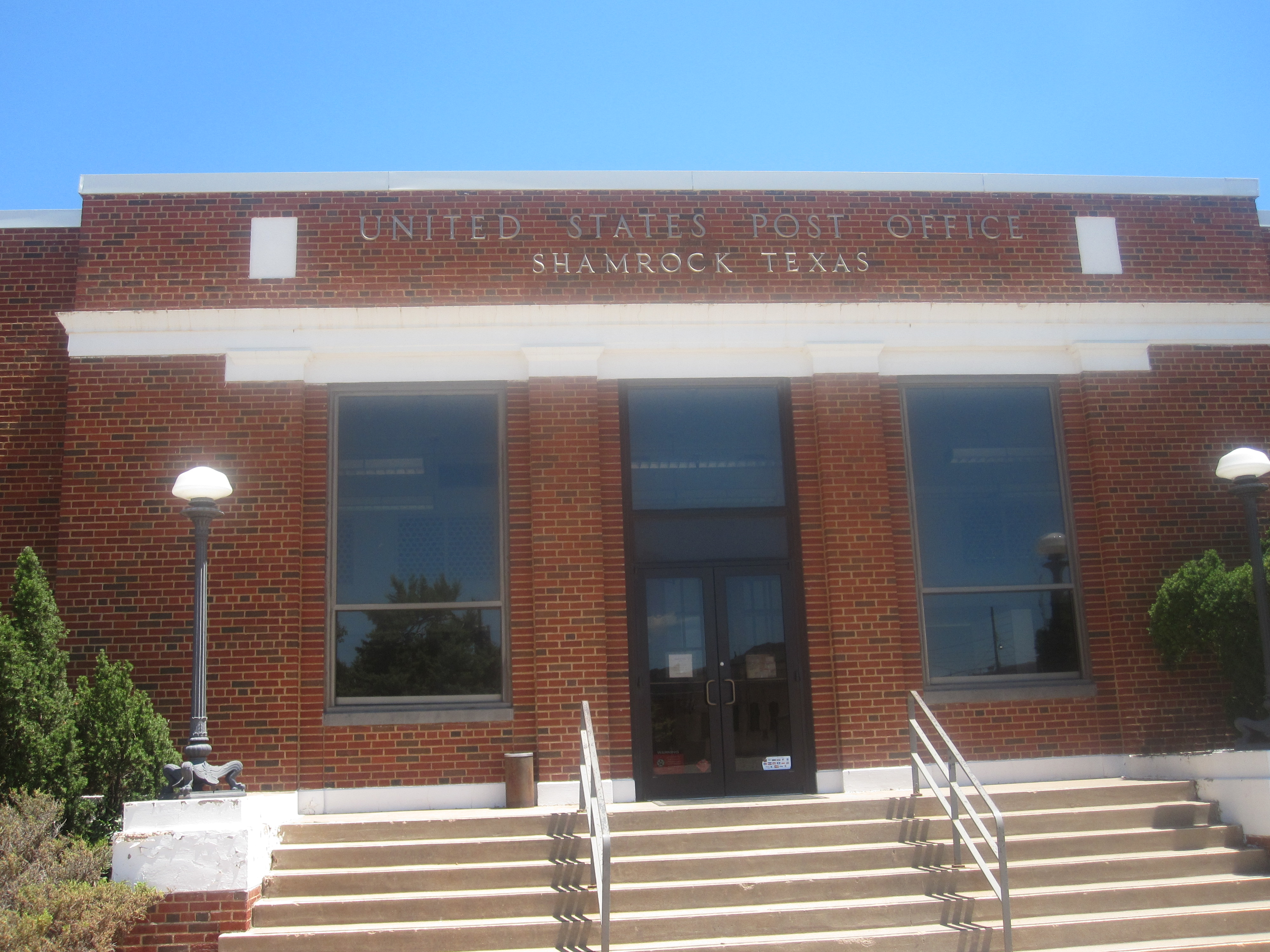
U.S. Post Office in Shamrock

Shamrock is a city in Wheeler County, Texas, United States. As of the 2020 census, the city had a total population of 1,789. The city is located in the eastern portion of the Texas Panhandle, centered along the crossroads of Interstate 40 (formerly U.S. Route 66) and U.S. Route 83. Due to its location at this intersection, Shamrock has been called the gateway to the Southwest. It is 110 miles (180 km) east of Amarillo, 188 miles (303 km) west of Oklahoma City, and 291 miles (468 km) northwest of Dallas.

== History ==
Located in south-central Wheeler County, Shamrock was the largest town in the county in the late 19th century. George and Dora Nickel consented to keep the first post office in their dugout in 1890. The mail was to be carried once a week from Mobeetie. The neighbors decided to let George name the office. His Irish-American mother had told him always to depend on a shamrock to bring him good luck, so holding true to his Irish descent, he suggested "Shamrock" for the name of the office. When a mysterious fire destroyed his dugout, however, George Nickel's post office never opened. Mary Ruth Jones became Shamrock's first postmistress, running the Shamrock post office out of the Jones family home.

In 1902, the Chicago, Rock Island and Gulf Railway set up a station in the town, calling it "Wheeler" like the county, but later changing it back to the original name of Shamrock in 1903, which prompted the reopening of the Shamrock post office. By 1907, the town was competing with the towns of Story and Benonine as trade centers.

The town continued its growth as other businesses moved into the city, including the county newspaper, which moved from Story and renamed itself from the Wheeler County Texan to the Shamrock Texan, several banks, and Shamrock Cotton Oil Mill. In 1911, E. L. Woodley became the mayor of the newly incorporated city. In 1926, the discovery of oil and the operation of natural gas wells by Shamrock Gas Company helped spur the city's continuing growth. A decline in the oil industry caused the population to drop in the 1940s, but it rebounded in the next decade with the improvement of Route 66. By the 1980s, the town was home to an established modern school system, a chemical plant, oil and gas processing plants, and a hospital.

At its peak in 1930, Shamrock had a population of 3,778. Despite some rebounds, the city population continues to fluctuate. According to the 2020 census, the city population has dropped to its second-lowest recorded point with 1,789 residents. Despite this, Shamrock remains the second-largest city on the Texas segment of Route 66, after Amarillo.

== Geography ==
According to the United States Census Bureau, the city has a total area of 2.1 square miles (5.4 km^{2}), all land.

=== Climate ===
Climate data for Shamrock, Texas
Month	Jan	Feb	Mar	Apr	May	Jun	Jul	Aug	Sep	Oct	Nov	Dec	Year
Mean daily maximum °F (°C)	48 (9)	54 (12)	62 (17)	72 (22)	79 (26)	88 (31)	93 (34)	92 (33)	84 (29)	73 (23)	59 (15)	50 (10)	71 (22)
Mean daily minimum °F (°C)	23 (−5)	27 (−3)	35 (2)	44 (7)	54 (12)	64 (18)	68 (20)	67 (19)	59 (15)	47 (8)	34 (1)	26 (−3)	46 (8)
Average precipitation inches (mm)	0.56 (14)	0.84 (21)	1.88 (48)	2.19 (56)	3.92 (100)	3.74 (95)	2.17 (55)	2.27 (58)	2.83 (72)	1.92 (49)	1.17 (30)	0.83 (21)	24.32 (619)
Source: weather.com

== Demographics ==
Historical population
Census	Pop.	Note	%±
1920	1,227		—
1930	3,780		208.1%
1940	3,123		−17.4%
1950	3,322		6.4%
1960	3,113		−6.3%
1970	2,644		−15.1%
1980	2,834		7.2%
1990	2,286		−19.3%
2000	2,029		−11.2%
2010	1,910		−5.9%
2020	1,789		−6.3%
U.S. Decennial Census

=== 2020 census ===
As of the 2020 census, Shamrock had a population of 1,789. The median age was 38.9 years; 26.8% of residents were under 18, and 20.4% of residents were 65 or older. For every 100 females, there were 100.1 males, and for every 100 females 18 and over, there were 92.1 males 18 and over.

None of the residents lived in urban areas, while 100.0% lived in rural areas.

Of the 762 households in Shamrock, 31.9% had children under 18 living in them, 45.8% were married-couple households, 21.9% were households with a male householder and no spouse or partner present, and 27.8% were households with a female householder and no spouse or partner present. About 33.0% of all households were made up of individuals, and 17.4% had someone living alone who was 65 or older.

The city had 973 housing units, of which 21.7% were vacant. The homeowner vacancy rate was 2.1% and the rental vacancy rate was 18.9%.

Racial composition as of the 2020 census
Race	Number	Percent
White	1,370	76.6%
Black or African American	69	3.9%
American Indian and Alaska Native	33	1.8%
Asian	23	1.3%
Native Hawaiian and Other Pacific Islander	2	0.1%
Some other race	146	8.2%
Two or more races	146	8.2%
Hispanic or Latino (of any race)	379	21.2%

=== 2021 American Community Survey ===
As of the 2021 American Community Survey, the median household income in Shamrock was $38,958. 22.1% of all people in Shamrock live below the poverty line. The median age in Shamrock was 36.7.

=== 2000 United States Census ===
As of the census of 2000, 2,029 people, 852 households, and 550 families resided in the city.

Economy

The median income for a household in the city was $25,776 and for a family was $33,542. Males had a median income of $24,688 versus $16,944 for females. The per capita income for the city was $13,724. About 22.7% of families and 21.4% of the population were below the poverty line, including 24.7% of those under 18 and 20.0% of those 65 or over.

Demographics

The racial makeup of the city was 85.26% White, 4.83% African American, 1.38% Native American, 0.99% Asian, 0.20% Pacific Islander, 5.91% from other races, and 1.43% from two or more races. Hispanic or Latino residents of any race were 13.41% of the population.

Of the 852 households, 28.3% had children under 18 living with them, 50.7% were married couples living together, 9.9% had a female householder with no husband present, and 35.4% were not families. About 33.0% of all households were made up of individuals, and 17.6% had someone living alone who was 65 or older. The average household size was 2.33, and the average family size was 2.95.

In the city, the population was distributed as 25.3% under 18, 6.3% from 18 to 24, 23.7% from 25 to 44, 22.4% from 45 to 64, and 22.3% who were 65 or older. The median age was 42 years. For every 100 females, there were 87.9 males. For every 100 females 18 and over, there were 83.1 males.

== Arts and culture ==
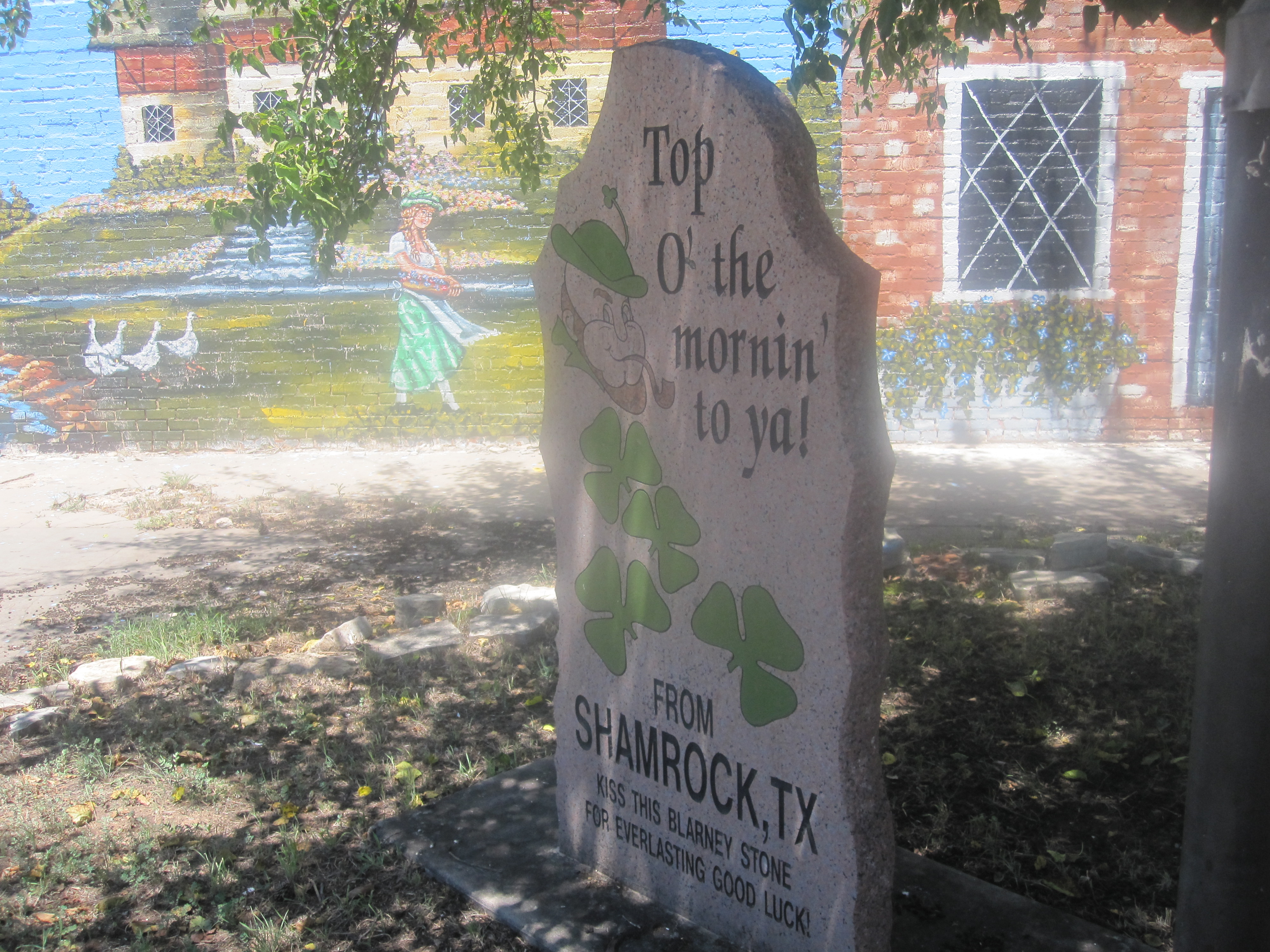
"Top O' the Mornin' to Ya'" slogan in Shamrock, Texas, which hosts an annual St. Patrick's Day observance

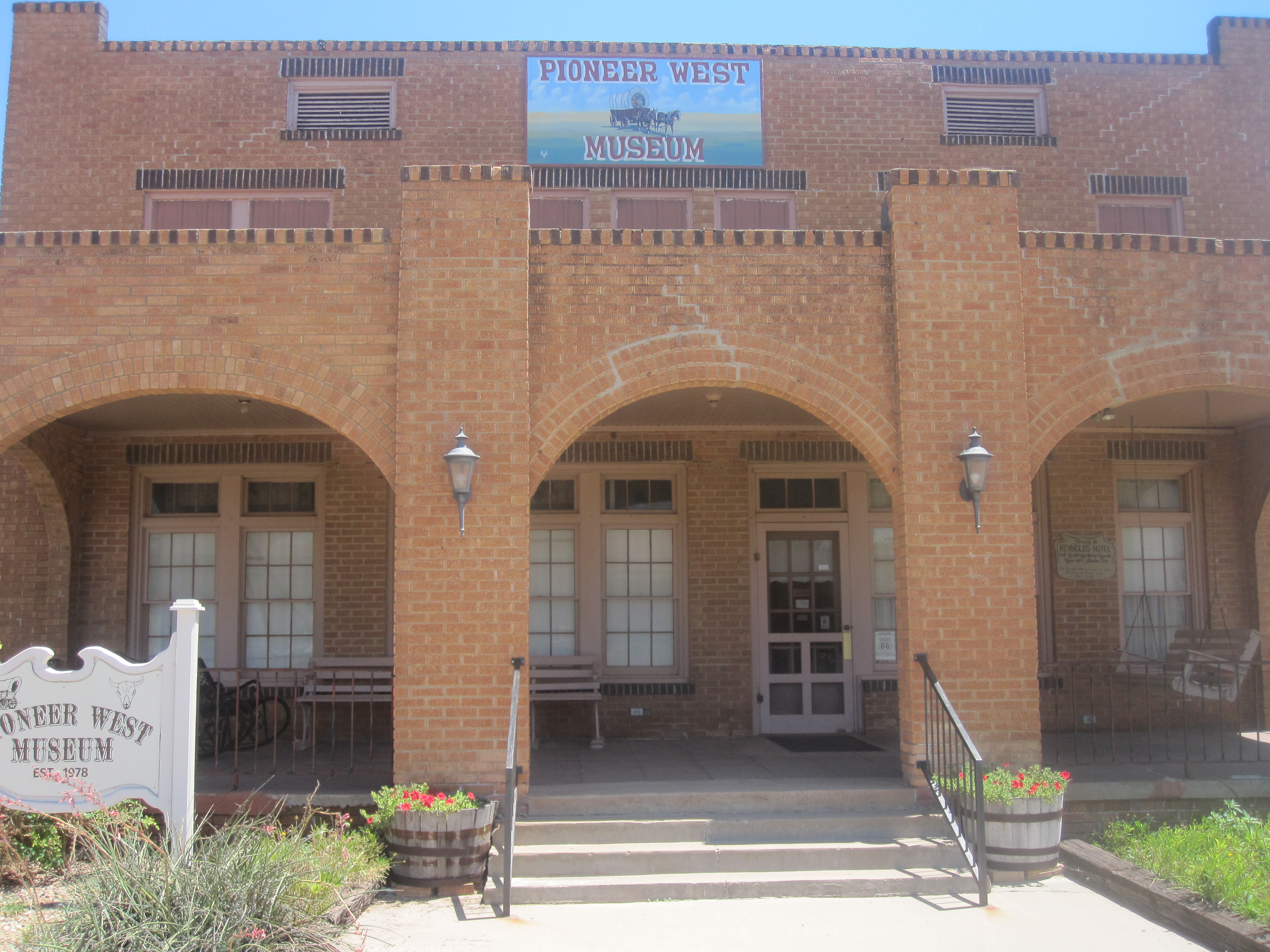
Pioneer West Museum is housed in the former Reynolds Hotel in Shamrock.

=== U-Drop Inn ===
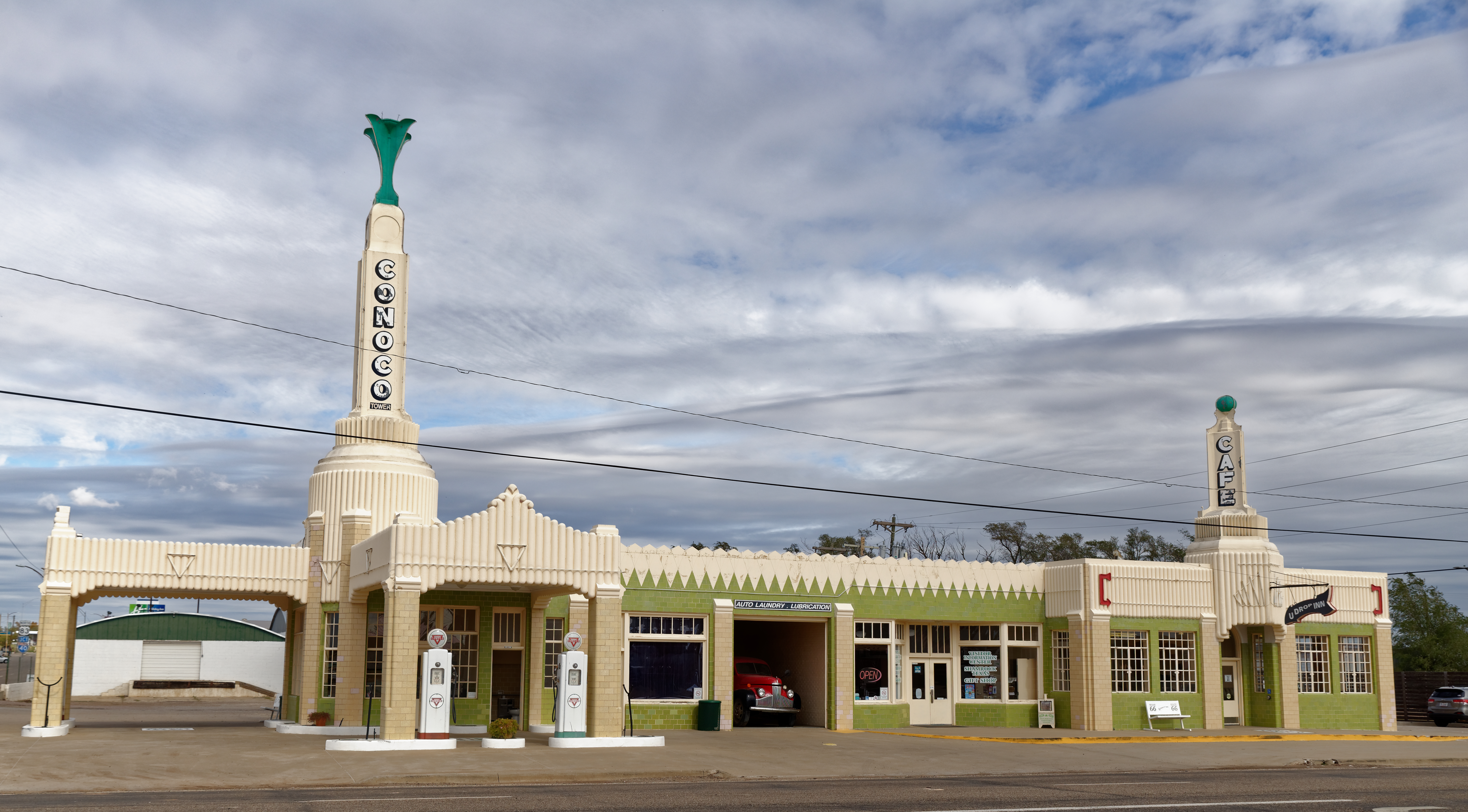
U-Drop Inn

In 1936, the U-Drop Inn was built at the intersection of U.S. Route 83 and the now historic Route 66. At the time of opening, the U-Drop was the only café within 100 miles (160 km) of Shamrock, enjoying brisk business and becoming a successful establishment. Once considered a beautiful and impressive example of Route 66 architecture in Texas, the U-Drop Inn fell into disrepair with the decommissioning of Route 66. Referred to as "one of the most impressive examples" of Route 66 architecture by the Texas Historical Commission, the U-Drop Inn was added to the National Register of Historic Places in 1997. In May 1999, the First National Bank of Shamrock purchased the then-closed U-Drop Inn and gave it to the city of Shamrock. With a $1.7 million federal grant, the city was able to hire a firm specializing in historical renovation to restore the building to its original condition and adapt it into a museum, visitors' center, gift shop, and the city's chamber of commerce. The revived U-Drop Inn was featured in the 2006 animated film Cars as the inspiration for the fictional Ramone's body shop.

=== Pioneer West Museum ===
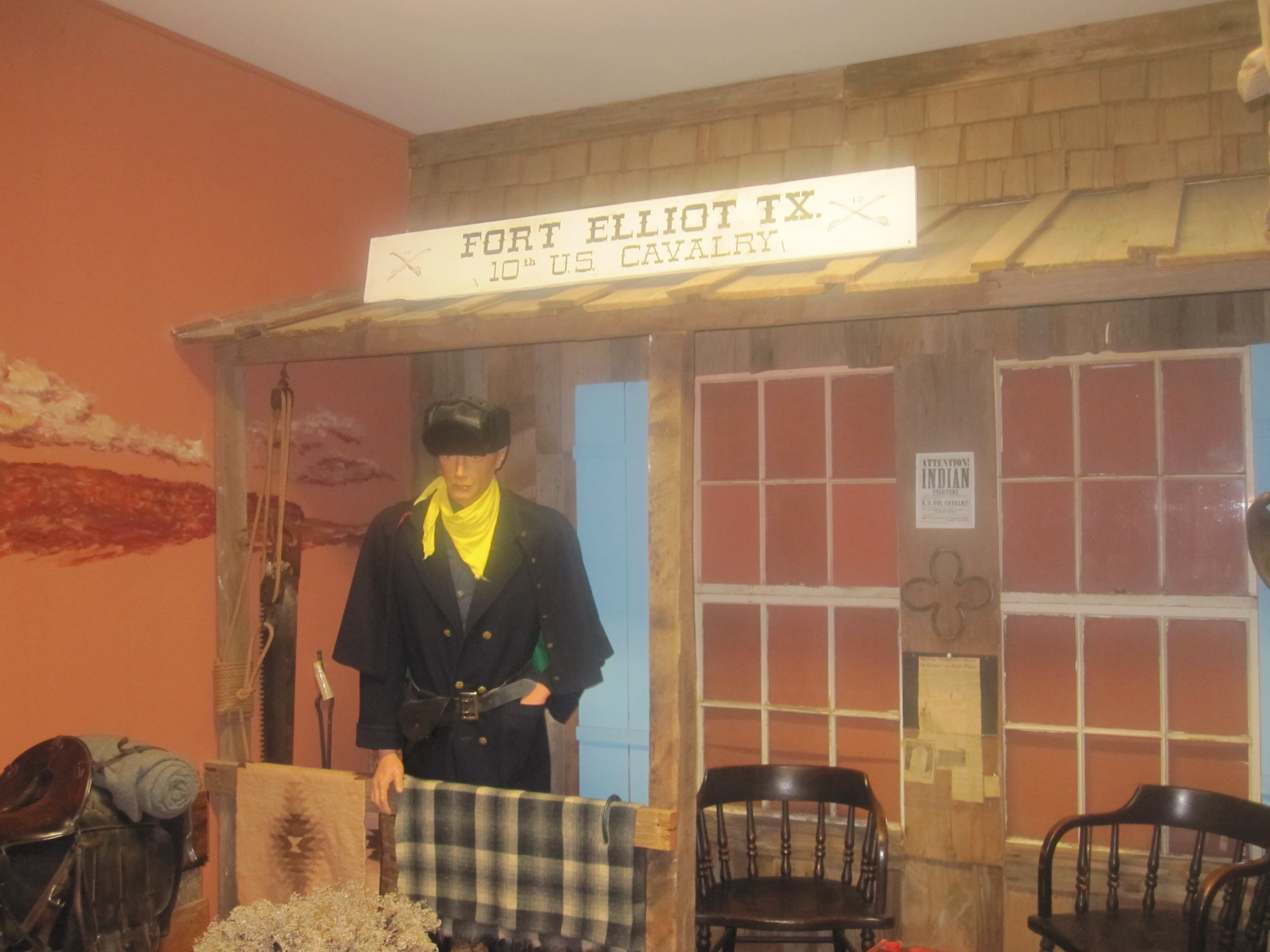
Fort Elliot, home of the 10th Cavalry, display at Pioneer West Museum

The Old Reynolds Hotel, a historic building, was saved from demolition and converted into a museum by local residents. The building with 25 rooms was turned into an exhibition hall with pioneer artifacts, typical objects of settlers, and Native American arrowheads. The exhibits range from local historical objects to a space exhibit to a military history exhibit.

=== Blarney Stone ===
Blarney Stone in Shamrock

A chunk of Ireland's Blarney Stone is located in Shamrock. In 1959, a local organization sent away for the stone to preserve the town's Irish image. Irish resistance to the stone leaving its homeland led to the stone being escorted by guards and an armored truck.

=== Festivals and celebrations ===
Two annual social gatherings are organized each year to celebrate the founder's heritage. The annual St. Patrick's Celebration is held on the weekend closest to St Patrick's Day. Irish Craftfest is held annually the first weekend of October at the Shamrock Area Community Center.

== Education ==
The City of Shamrock is served by the Shamrock Independent School District and home to the Shamrock High School Irish.

The Texas Legislature assigns all of Wheeler County to Clarendon College.

== Infrastructure ==
The Shamrock Municipal Airport serves the city and is located east of Shamrock, just north of Interstate 40.

=== Major highways ===
- Interstate 40
- U.S. Route 83

== Notable people ==
- Bill Mack, singer and songwriter
- Gene Price, songwriter, musician and vocalist; longtime songwriting associate of Buck Owens
- Larry Salmans, Kansas state legislator
- Holice Turnbow, artist and quilter
- Eugene Worley, reared in Shamrock; U.S. representative from Texas's 18th congressional district from 1941 to 1950

== In popular culture ==
Shamrock was mentioned in season one, episode one of The X-Files, "Pilot", by FBI agent Fox Mulder as the location of one example of many of the mysterious markings found on corpses of victims of unexplained deaths to new partner FBI agent Dr. Dana Scully.

Shamrock was mentioned in the first season of the 2000 sitcom Yes, Dear, episode 13, "Jimmy's Jimmy", when Jimmy's best friend, Billy, reported the rear axle fell off his Subaru Brat in Shamrock en route to California.

Shamrock was featured in Ken Block’s film Gymkhana 10, with Ken driving a heavily modified Ford pickup, doing extreme stunts.
