= Mobeetie, Texas =

- City
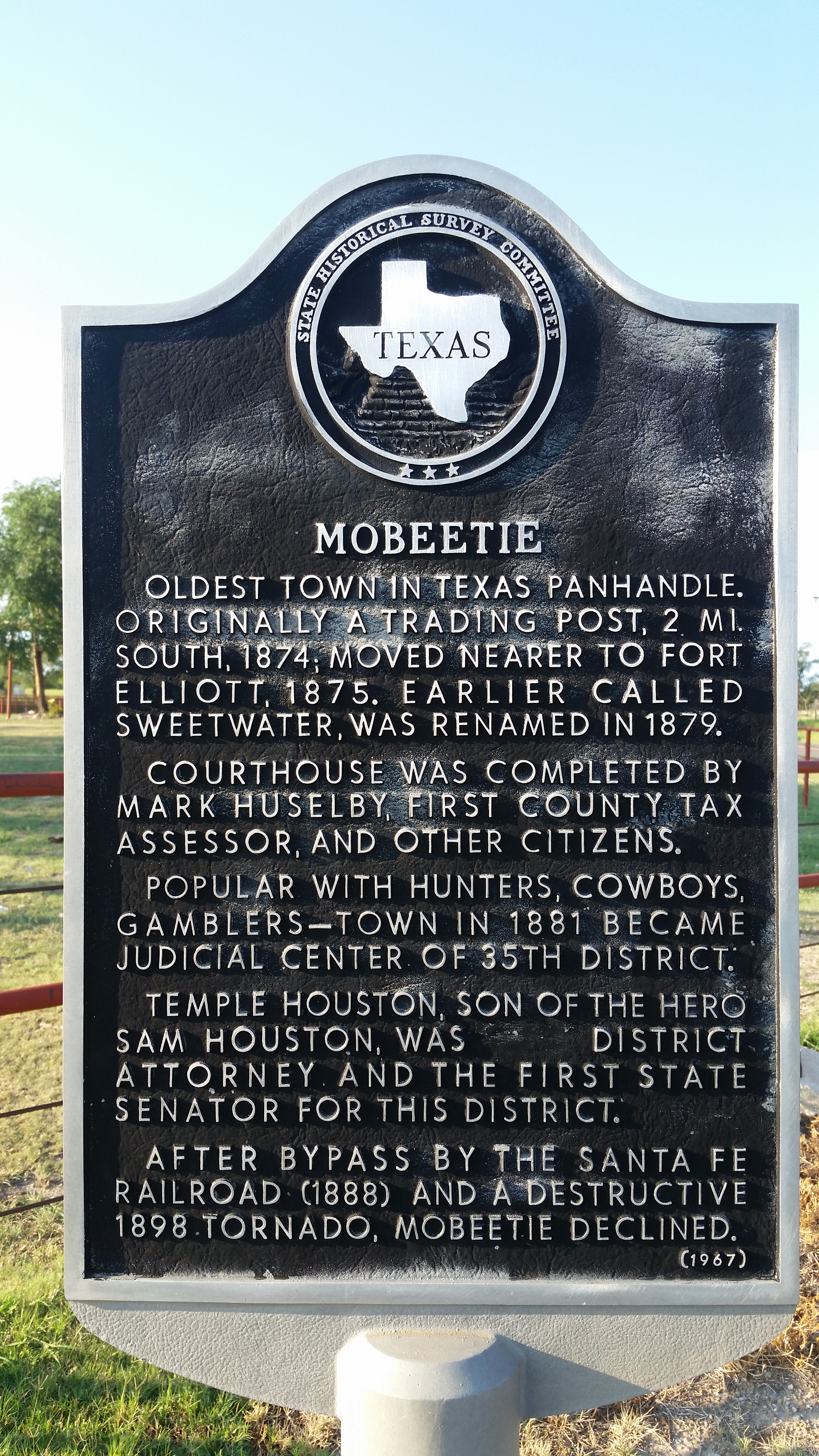
- Texas Historical marker for Mobeetie

- Coordinates: 35°31′05″N 100°26′18″W
- Country: United States
- State: Texas
- County: Wheeler

Area
  - Total: 0.61 sq mi (1.58 km^{2})
  - Land: 0.61 sq mi (1.58 km^{2})
  - Water: 0 sq mi (0.00 km^{2})
- Elevation: 2,618 ft (798 m)

Population (2020)
  - Total: 87
  - Density: 140/sq mi (55/km^{2})
- Time zone: UTC-6 (Central (CST))
  - Summer (DST): UTC-5 (CDT)
- ZIP code: 79061
- Area code: 806
- FIPS code: 48-48852
- GNIS feature ID: 2411128

Mobeetie is a city in northwestern Wheeler County, Texas, United States, located on Sweetwater Creek and State Highway 152. Its population was 87 at the 2020 census.

== History ==
Mobeetie (formerly known as "Cantonment Sweetwater") was a trading post for hunters and trappers for nearby United States Army outpost Fort Elliott. It was first a buffalo hunters' camp unofficially called "Hidetown". Connected to the major cattle-drive town of Dodge City, Kansas, by the Jones-Plummer Trail, Mobeetie was a destination for stagecoach freight and buffalo skinners. As it grew, the town supported the development of cattle ranches within a hundred-mile radius by supplying the staple crops.^{1}

The first formal name for the town was "Sweetwater". It was located on the North Fork Red River, a tributary of the Red River of the South. Nearby Fort Elliott, developed to protect the buffalo trade from Indian raiders, stimulated further growth of the town. On January 24, 1876, the "Sweetwater Shootout" occurred. Anthony Cook (Corporal "Sergeant" Melvin A. King; of the then-4th Cavalry Company H, stationed at Fort Elliot) shot and killed Mollie Brennan (a dancehall girl and former prostitute). Sgt. King then wounded Bat Masterson, who in turn killed him (King may have shot Masterson first and then killed Brennan; accounts vary). Texas cattleman Charles Goodnight said about the town: "I think it was the hardest place I ever saw on the frontier except Cheyenne, Wyoming."

When the town applied for a post office in 1879, the name "Sweetwater" was already in use. The town took the new name of "Mobeetie", believed to be a Native American word for Sweetwater. It was allegedly later revealed that the word, in fact, meant "buffalo dung."

Because of the presence of Fort Elliott and Mobeetie's importance as a commercial center, Wheeler County became the first politically organized county in the Texas Panhandle, in 1879, followed by Oldham County at Tascosa, now a ghost town. Mobeetie became the first county seat for Wheeler County. From 1880 to 1883, the notorious Robert Clay Allison ranched with his two brothers, John William and Jeremiah Monroe, 12 miles northeast of town, at the junction of the Washita River and Gageby Creek. One day, Allison rode through Mobeetie drunk and naked. Allison married America Medora "Dora" McCulloch in Mobeetie on February 15, 1881.

At its peak in 1890, the town had over 400 people, but Mobeetie's boom days ended when Fort Elliott closed that same year. Further decline came with the tornado of May 1, 1898, and then the loss of the county seat, in 1907, to Wheeler. In 1929, Mobeetie moved two miles when the Panhandle and Santa Fe Railway built nearby tracks. The town steadily grew again until the start of World War II brought a peak around 500.

Mobeetie is also known as the birthplace of a member of the 1919 World Series champion Cincinnati Reds, infielder and catcher Morrie Rath. Rath was born on Christmas Day 1886.

== Geography ==
Mobeetie is located in the Texas Panhandle northeast of Sweetwater Creek along Texas State Highway 152, Farm to Market Road 48, and Farm to Market Road 1046. Pampa lies about 30 miles to the west, and Wheeler is about 10 miles to the east along route 152. The Fort Elliot historical site is about one mile west along SH 152.

According to the United States Census Bureau, the city has a total area of 0.6 sq mi (1.6 km^{2}), all land.

== Demographics ==
Historical population
Census	Pop.	Note	%±
1890	400		—
1900	128		−68.0%
1910	250		95.3%
1940	500		—
1980	291		—
1990	154		−47.1%
2000	107		−30.5%
2010	101		−5.6%
2020	87		−13.9%
U.S. Decennial Census Handbook of Texas Online 2020 Census

=== 2020 census ===
As of the 2020 census, Mobeetie had a population of 87. The median age was 55.1 years, 17.2% of residents were under the age of 18, and 33.3% were 65 years of age or older. For every 100 females there were 112.2 males, and for every 100 females age 18 and over there were 94.6 males age 18 and over.

0.0% of residents lived in urban areas, while 100.0% lived in rural areas.

There were 41 households in Mobeetie, of which 24.4% had children under the age of 18 living in them. Of all households, 56.1% were married-couple households, 22.0% were households with a male householder and no spouse or partner present, and 17.1% were households with a female householder and no spouse or partner present. About 9.8% of all households were made up of individuals and 2.4% had someone living alone who was 65 years of age or older.

There were 65 housing units, of which 36.9% were vacant. The homeowner vacancy rate was 6.5% and the rental vacancy rate was 31.6%.

Racial composition as of the 2020 census
Race	Number	Percent
White	82	94.3%
Black or African American	1	1.1%
American Indian and Alaska Native	0	0.0%
Asian	0	0.0%
Native Hawaiian and Other Pacific Islander	0	0.0%
Some other race	1	1.1%
Two or more races	3	3.4%
Hispanic or Latino (of any race)	4	4.6%

=== 2000 census ===
As of the 2000 census 107 people, 48 households, and 28 families were residing in the city. The population density was 175.3 inhabitants per square mile (67.7/km^{2}). The 68 housing units averaged 111.4/sq mi (43.0/km^{2}). The racial makeup of the city was 99.07% White and 0.93% Native American. Hispanics or Latinos of any race were 6.54% of the population.

Of the 48 households, 27.1% had children under the age of 18 living with them, 50.0% were married couples living together, 8.3% had a female householder with no husband present, and 39.6% were not families. About 37.5% of all households were made up of individuals, and 20.8% had someone living alone who was 65 years of age or older. The average household size was 2.23, and the average family size was 2.97.

In the city, the age distribution was 27.1% under 18, 3.7% from 18 to 24, 24.3% from 25 to 44, 21.5% from 45 to 64, and 23.4% who were 65 or older. The median age was 41 years. For every 100 females, there were 101.9 males. For every 100 females age 18 and over, there were 95.0 males.

The median income for a household in the city was $35,625, and for a family was $39,583. Males had a median income of $35,417 versus $23,125 for females. The per capita income for the city was $16,059. There were no families and 2.9% of the population living below the poverty line, including no one under 18 or over 64.

== Education ==
The City of Mobeetie is served by the Fort Elliott Consolidated Independent School District. The former Mobeetie Independent School District merged into FECISD on August 10, 1991.

The Texas Legislature assigns all of Wheeler County to Clarendon College.

== Climate ==
According to the Köppen climate classification, Mobeetie has a semiarid climate, BSk on climate maps.
