= Wheeler County, Texas =

County in Texas, United States

- County
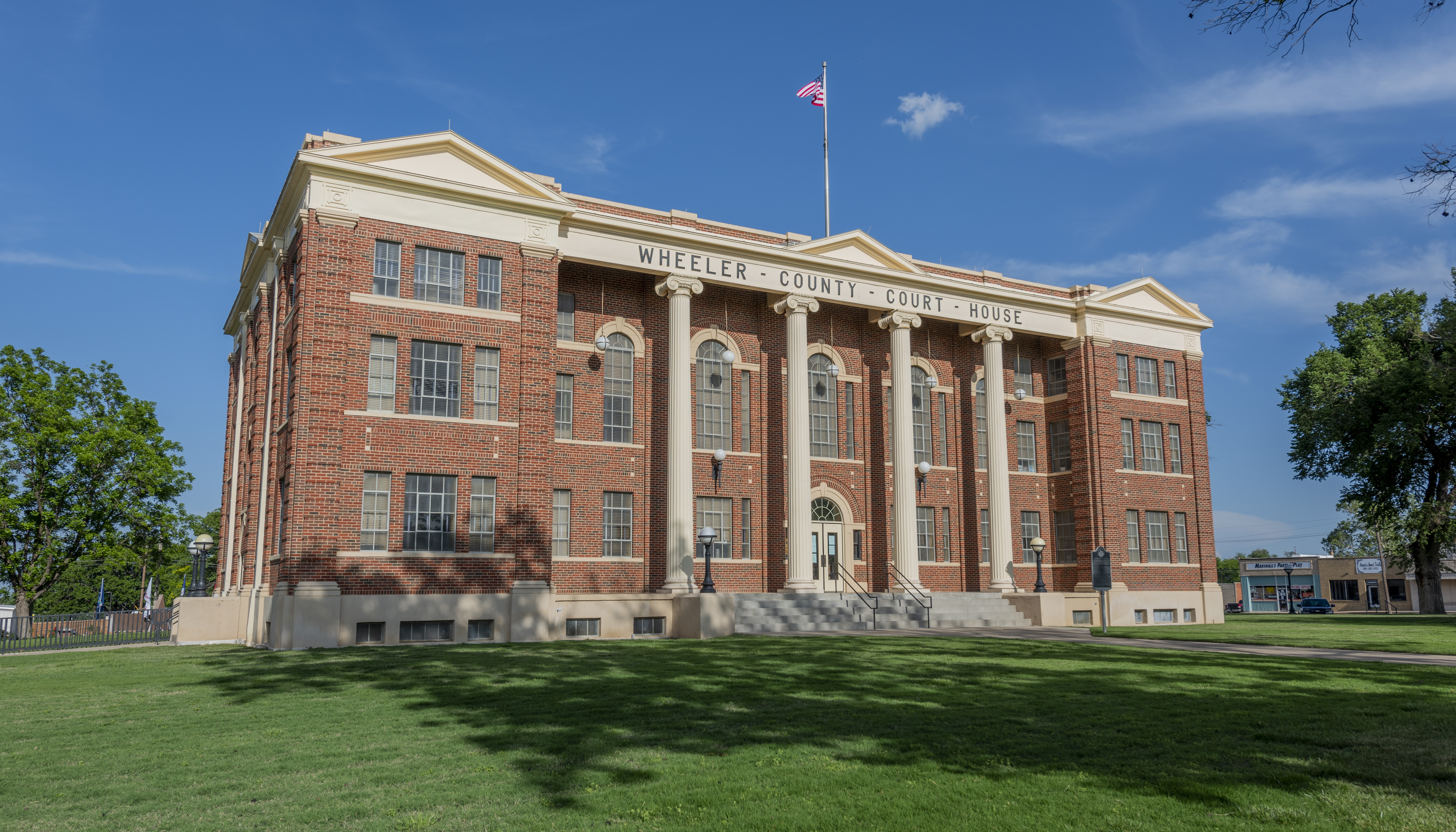
- Wheeler County Courthouse

- Location within the U.S. state of Texas
- Coordinates: 35°24′N 100°16′W
- Country: United States
- State: Texas
- Founded: 1879
- Named for: Royall T. Wheeler
- Seat: Wheeler
- Largest city: Shamrock

Area
  - Total: 915 sq mi (2,370 km^{2})
  - Land: 915 sq mi (2,370 km^{2})
  - Water: 1.0 sq mi (2.6 km^{2}) 0.1%

Population (2020)
  - Total: 4,990
  - Estimate (2025): 4,773 ▼
  - Density: 5.45/sq mi (2.11/km^{2})
- Time zone: UTC−6 (Central)
  - Summer (DST): UTC−5 (CDT)
- Congressional district: 13th
- Website: www.wheelercounty.texas.gov

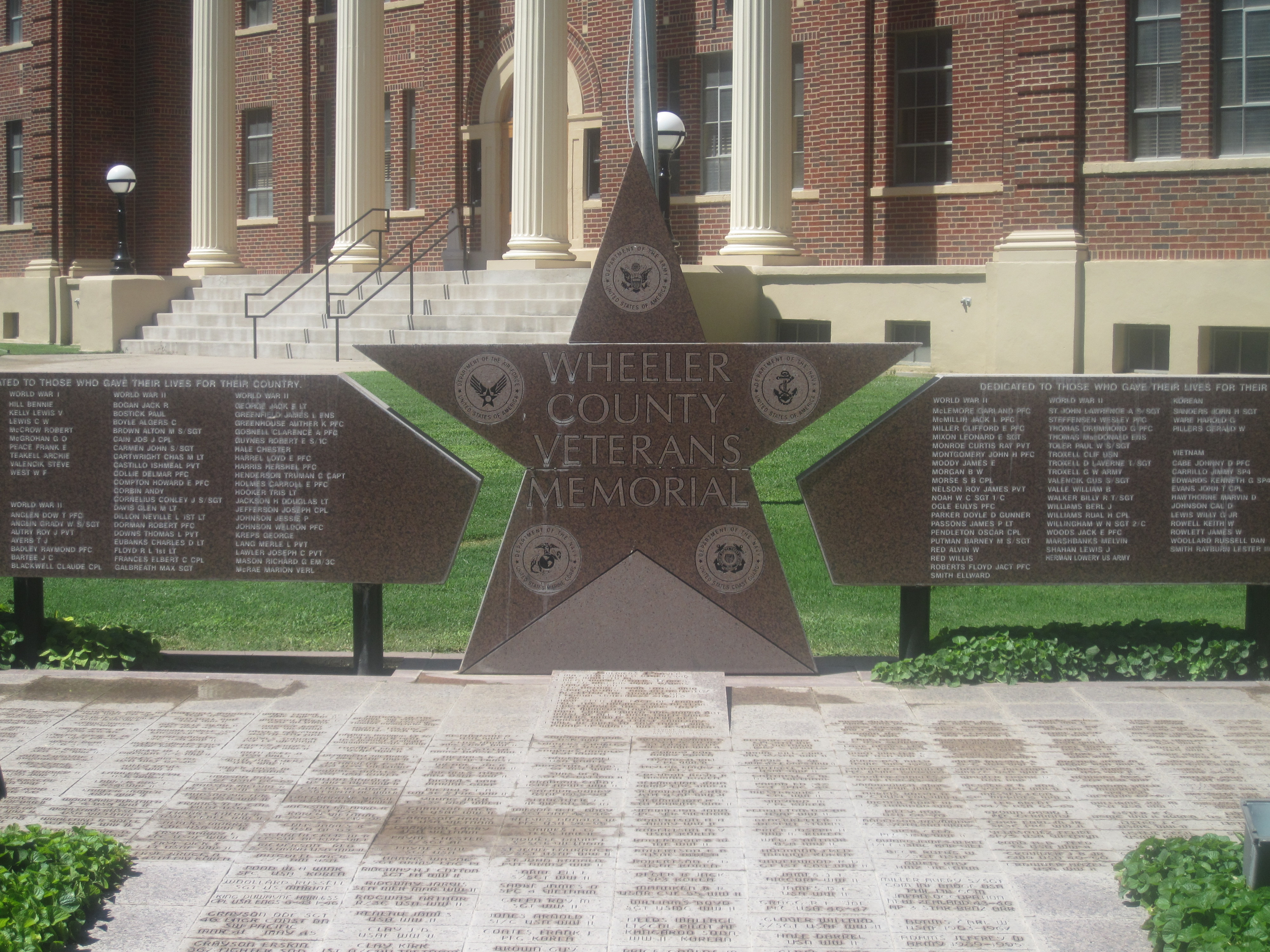
Wheeler County Veterans Memorial

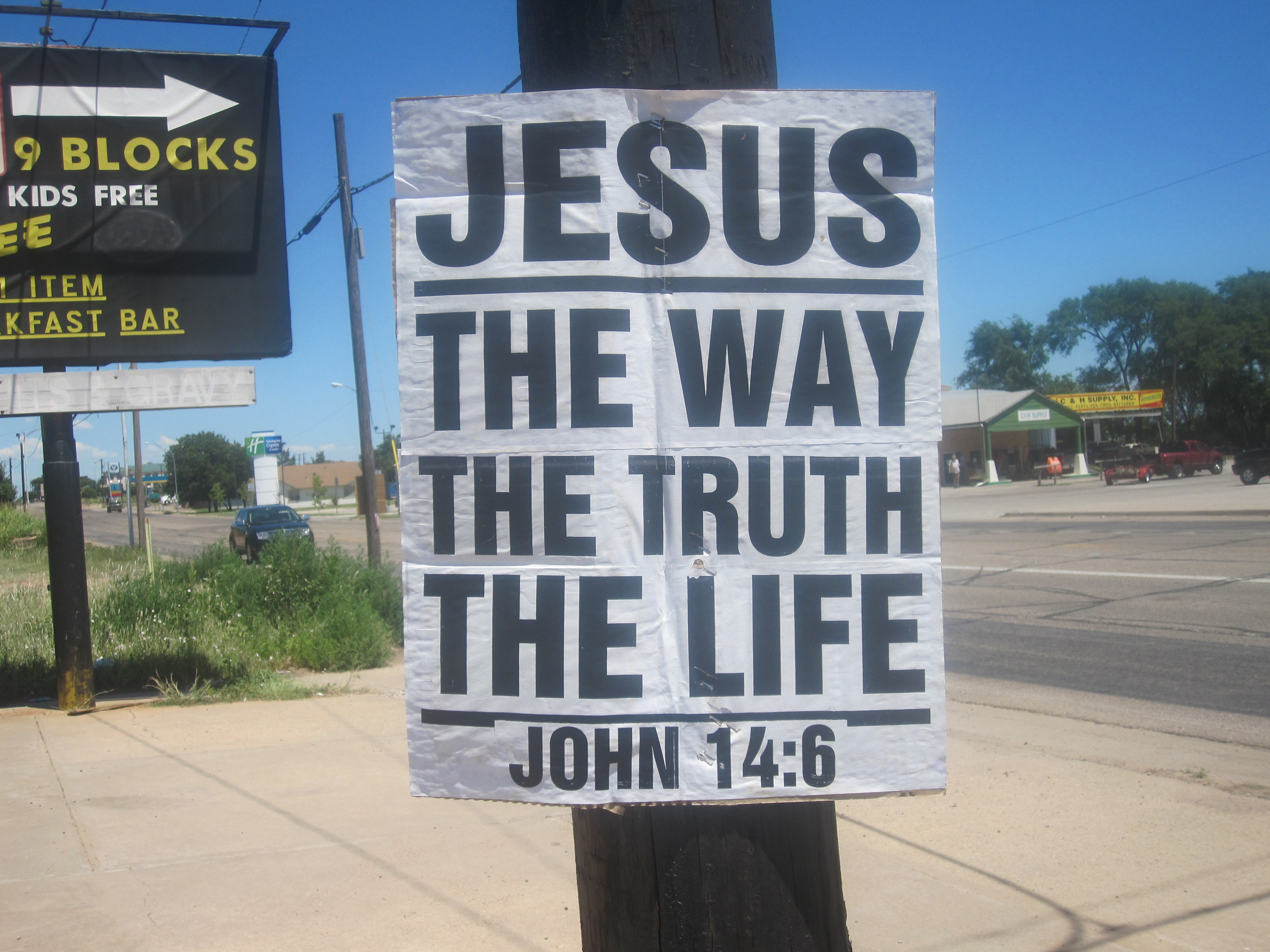
John 14:6 sign along U.S. Route 66 in Wheeler County

Wheeler County is a county located in the U.S. state of Texas. As of the 2020 census, its population was 4,990. Its county seat is Wheeler. The county was formed in 1876 and organized in 1879. It is named for Royall Tyler Wheeler, a chief justice of the Texas Supreme Court.

Wheeler County was formerly one of 30 entirely dry counties in the state of Texas. However, circa 2010, the community of Shamrock, located in Wheeler County at the intersection of Interstate 40 and U.S. Highway 83, voted to allow liquor sales. Within the city limits of Shamrock is the only place to purchase liquor in Wheeler County.

The Pioneer West Museum, the Wheeler County historical museum, is located in Shamrock off U.S. Highway 83.

== Geography ==
According to the U.S. Census Bureau, the county has a total area of 915 square miles (2,370 km^{2}), of which 915 square miles (2,370 km^{2}) are land and 1.0 square mile (2.6 km^{2}) (0.1%) is covered by water.

=== Major highways ===
- I-40
  - I-40 BL (Shamrock)
- US 83
- SH 152
- Spur 30

=== Adjacent counties ===
- Hemphill County (north)
- Roger Mills County, Oklahoma (northeast)
- Beckham County, Oklahoma (east)
- Collingsworth County (south)
- Gray County (west)
- Donley County (southwest)
- Roberts County (northwest)

== Demographics ==
Historical population
Census	Pop.	Note	%±
1880	512		—
1890	778		52.0%
1900	636		−18.3%
1910	5,258		726.7%
1920	7,397		40.7%
1930	15,555		110.3%
1940	12,411		−20.2%
1950	10,317		−16.9%
1960	7,947		−23.0%
1970	6,434		−19.0%
1980	7,137		10.9%
1990	5,879		−17.6%
2000	5,284		−10.1%
2010	5,410		2.4%
2020	4,990		−7.8%
2025 (est.)	4,773	▼	−4.3%
U.S. Decennial Census; 1850–1900 1910; 1920 1930 1940; 1950 1960 1970; 1980 1990 2000; 2010 2020

=== Racial and ethnic composition ===
Wheeler County, Texas – Racial and ethnic composition Note: the US Census treats Hispanic/Latino as an ethnic category. This table excludes Latinos from the racial categories and assigns them to a separate category. Hispanics/Latinos may be of any race.
Race / Ethnicity (NH = Non-Hispanic)	Pop 2000	Pop 2010	Pop 2020	% 2000	% 2010	% 2020
White alone (NH)	4,386	3,847	3,469	83.01%	71.11%	69.52%
Black or African American alone (NH)	137	112	81	2.59%	2.07%	1.62%
Native American or Alaska Native alone (NH)	29	20	33	0.55%	0.37%	0.66%
Asian alone (NH)	29	23	24	0.55%	0.43%	0.48%
Pacific Islander alone (NH)	4	0	2	0.08%	0.00%	0.04%
Other race alone (NH)	0	3	12	0.00%	0.06%	0.24%
Mixed or multiracial (NH)	35	61	142	0.66%	1.13%	2.85%
Hispanic or Latino (any race)	664	1,344	1,227	12.57%	24.84%	24.59%
Total	5,284	5,410	4,990	100.00%	100.00%	100.00%

=== 2020 census ===
As of the 2020 census, the county had a population of 4,990. The median age was 42.3 years. 24.4% of residents were under the age of 18 and 21.8% of residents were 65 years of age or older. For every 100 females there were 100.2 males, and for every 100 females age 18 and over there were 95.3 males age 18 and over.

The racial makeup of the county was 75.1% White, 1.7% Black or African American, 1.1% American Indian and Alaska Native, 0.5% Asian, <0.1% Native Hawaiian and Pacific Islander, 10.4% from some other race, and 11.1% from two or more races. Hispanic or Latino residents of any race comprised 24.6% of the population.

About 0.1% of the residents lived in urban areas, while almost 100% lived in rural areas.

Of the 2,001 households in the county, 32.5% had children under 18 living in them. Of all households, 55.2% were married-couple households, 17.5% were households with a male householder and no spouse or partner present, and 23.3% were households with a female householder and no spouse or partner present. About 26.1% of all households were made up of individuals and 13.4% had someone living alone who was 65 or older.

Of the 2,598 housing units, 23.0% were vacant. Among occupied housing units, 76.4% were owner-occupied and 23.6% were renter-occupied. The homeowner vacancy rate was 2.7% and the rental vacancy rate was 18.3%.

=== 2000 census ===
As of the 2000 census, 5,284 people, 2,152 households, and 1,487 families resided in the county. The population density was 6 people per square mile (2.3 people/km^{2}). The 2,687 housing units had an average density of 3 units per square mile (1.2 units/km^{2}). The racial makeup of the county was 87.83% White, 2.78% Black or African American, 0.78% Native American, 0.55% Asian, 0.08% Pacific Islander, 6.64% from other races, and 1.34% from two or more races. About 12.57% of the population were Hispanic or Latino of any race.

Of the 2,152 households, 29.6% had children under 18 living with them, 58.0% were married couples living together, 7.7% had a female householder with no husband present, and 30.9% were not families. About 29.1% of all households were made up of individuals, and 16.9% had someone living alone who was 65 or older. The average household size was 2.39 and the average family size was 2.94.

In the county, the age distribution was 24.9% under 18, 6.50% from 18 to 24, 22.50% from 25 to 44, 25.20% from 45 to 64, and 20.90% who were 65 or older. The median age was 42 years. For every 100 females, there were 92.0 males. For every 100 females 18 and over, there were 87.4 males.

The median income for a household in the county was $31,029, and for a family was $36,989. Males had a median income of $26,790 versus $19,091 for females. The per capita income for the county was $16,083. About 11.6% of families and 13.0% of the population were below the poverty line, including 13.3% of those under 18 and 16.8% of those 65 or over.

== Politics ==
Wheeler County is located in Texas House of Representatives District 88. The county was previously in District 68 from 2013 to 2023. Republican Ken King, a businessman from Canadian in Hemphill County, has represented Wheeler County in the Texas House of Representatives since the redistricting.

Wheeler County is located within District 28 of the Texas Senate.

The representative from 1971 to 1979 was the Democrat Phil Cates, later a lobbyist in Austin.

United States presidential election results for Wheeler County, Texas
Year	Republican		Democratic		Third party(ies)	
Year	No.	%	No.	%	No.	%
1912	35	6.31%	402	72.43%	118	21.26%
1916	56	8.00%	554	79.14%	90	12.86%
1920	198	26.33%	516	68.62%	38	5.05%
1924	197	17.12%	908	78.89%	46	4.00%
1928	1,038	57.86%	750	41.81%	6	0.33%
1932	165	6.75%	2,263	92.56%	17	0.70%
1936	277	10.24%	2,415	89.31%	12	0.44%
1940	517	16.55%	2,600	83.23%	7	0.22%
1944	511	19.54%	1,869	71.47%	235	8.99%
1948	370	15.04%	2,010	81.71%	80	3.25%
1952	1,645	51.37%	1,551	48.44%	6	0.19%
1956	1,178	48.22%	1,252	51.25%	13	0.53%
1960	1,428	58.43%	1,011	41.37%	5	0.20%
1964	1,138	44.11%	1,440	55.81%	2	0.08%
1968	1,176	45.97%	812	31.74%	570	22.28%
1972	1,766	77.87%	502	22.13%	0	0.00%
1976	1,273	44.08%	1,598	55.33%	17	0.59%
1980	1,626	59.28%	1,090	39.74%	27	0.98%
1984	2,251	73.51%	805	26.29%	6	0.20%
1988	1,703	61.33%	1,067	38.42%	7	0.25%
1992	1,458	52.69%	938	33.90%	371	13.41%
1996	1,355	59.20%	750	32.77%	184	8.04%
2000	1,787	74.80%	579	24.24%	23	0.96%
2004	1,960	81.87%	420	17.54%	14	0.58%
2008	1,918	85.43%	314	13.99%	13	0.58%
2012	1,878	88.25%	232	10.90%	18	0.85%
2016	2,087	90.50%	194	8.41%	25	1.08%
2020	2,159	92.38%	168	7.19%	10	0.43%
2024	2,093	92.04%	169	7.43%	12	0.53%

United States Senate election results for Wheeler County, Texas1
Year	Republican		Democratic		Third party(ies)	
Year	No.	%	No.	%	No.	%
2024	2,025	89.88%	192	8.52%	36	1.60%

United States Senate election results for Wheeler County, Texas2
Year	Republican		Democratic		Third party(ies)	
Year	No.	%	No.	%	No.	%
2020	2,079	91.14%	165	7.23%	37	1.62%

Texas Gubernatorial election results for Wheeler County
Year	Republican		Democratic		Third party(ies)	
Year	No.	%	No.	%	No.	%
2022	1,569	93.06%	103	6.11%	14	0.83%

== Communities ==
=== Cities ===
- Mobeetie
- Shamrock
- Wheeler (county seat)

=== Census-designated places ===
- Allison

=== Other unincorporated communities ===
- Benonine
- Briscoe
- Kelton
- Twitty
- Lela

== Education ==
School districts include:

- Fort Elliott Consolidated Independent School District
- Kelton Independent School District
- McLean Independent School District
- Shamrock Independent School District
- Wheeler Independent School District

FECISD formed on August 10, 1991 by the merger of Briscoe ISD and Mobeetie ISD.

The Texas Legislature assigns all of Wheeler County to Clarendon College.

== See also ==
- List of museums in the Texas Panhandle
- National Register of Historic Places listings in Wheeler County, Texas
- Recorded Texas Historic Landmarks in Wheeler County
