= Landergin =

Landergin may refer to:

== People ==
- Patrick H. Landergin (1854-1929), American politician and rancher.

== Places ==
- Landergin, Texas, a ghost town in Oldham County, Texas, USA.
- Landergin Mesa, an archeological site in Oldham County, Texas, USA.
- Landergin-Harrington House, a historic house on the NRHP in Amarillo, Texas, USA.
