= National Register of Historic Places listings in Oldham County, Texas =

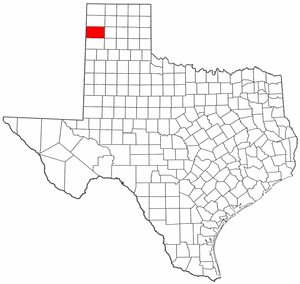
Location of Oldham County in Texas

This is a list of the National Register of Historic Places listings in Oldham County, Texas

This is intended to be a complete list of properties listed on the National Register of Historic Places in Oldham County, Texas. There are 12 properties listed on the National Register in the county including one National Historic Landmark.

This National Park Service list is complete through NPS recent listings posted March 21, 2025.

== Current listings ==
The publicly disclosed locations of National Register properties may be seen in a mapping service provided.

	Name on the Register	Image	Date listed	Location	City or town	Description
1	Chavez City Ruins (41OL253)	Chavez City Ruins (41OL253)	July 12, 1984 (#84001925)	Address restricted	Amarillo	
2	Chavez Suburbs East and West (41OL254)	Chavez Suburbs East and West (41OL254)	July 12, 1984 (#84001928)	Address restricted	Amarillo	
3	Green No. 5 (41OL257)	Green No. 5 (41OL257)	July 12, 1984 (#84001936)	Address restricted	Amarillo	
4	Griffin Site (41OL246)	Griffin Site (41OL246)	July 12, 1984 (#84001938)	Address restricted	Amarillo	
5	Landergin Mesa	Landergin Mesa	October 15, 1966 (#66000821)	Address restricted	Vega	
6	Mansfield I (41OL50)	Mansfield I (41OL50)	July 12, 1984 (#84001940)	Address restricted	Amarillo	
7	Maston I (41OL256)	Maston I (41OL256)	July 12, 1984 (#84001942)	Address restricted	Amarillo	
8	Maston No. 13 Stone Wall (41OL249)	Maston No. 13 Stone Wall (41OL249)	September 10, 1984 (#84001945)	Address restricted	Adrian	
9	Maston No. 52 (41OL235)	Maston No. 52 (41OL235)	July 12, 1984 (#84001948)	Address restricted	Amarillo	
10	Rocky Dell	Rocky Dell	February 23, 1972 (#72001370)	Address restricted	Adrian	
11	Stone Corrals No. 1-6 (41OL250)	Stone Corrals No. 1-6 (41OL250)	July 12, 1984 (#84001951)	Address restricted	Amarillo	
12	Vega Motel	Vega Motel	October 5, 2006 (#06000926)	1005 Vega Blvd. 35°14′33″N 102°25′46″W	Vega	

== See also ==
- National Register of Historic Places listings in Texas
- Recorded Texas Historic Landmarks in Oldham County
