= Adrian High School (Texas) =

Location
- 301 Matador Dr. Adrian, Texas 79001-0189; United States; 35.2755°N 102.6649°W

Information
- School type: Public high school
- School district: Adrian Independent School District
- Superintendent: Steve Reynolds
- Principal: Dawn Brooks
- Teaching staff: 17.21 (FTE)
- Grades: PK-12
- Enrollment: 117 (2023–2024)
- Student to teacher ratio: 6.80
- Colors: Maroon & White
- Athletics conference: UIL Class A
- Mascot: Matador/Lady Matador
- Website: adrianisd.net

Adrian High School or Adrian School is a public high school located in Adrian, Texas, United States, and classified as a 1A school by the UIL. It is part of the Adrian Independent School District located in south central Oldham County.

== Programs ==
=== Athletics ===
Adrian ISD competes in UIL 1A cross country, basketball, track, tennis, and golf.

=== FFA ===
Adrian FFA competes in leadership, career, and speaking development events, in addition to recordbook and scholarship awards, and stock showing.

=== UIL ===
Adrian ISD participates in elementary, junior high, and high school UIL events, including academics, speaking, and theater.
