= Landergin Mesa =

- U.S. National Register of Historic Places
- U.S. National Historic Landmark
- Location: Address restricted
- Nearest city: Vega, Texas
- Built: 1300
- NRHP reference No.: 66000821

Significant dates
- Added to NRHP: October 15, 1966
- Designated NHL: July 19, 1964

Landergin Mesa, near Vega, Texas, is an archeological site, preserving some of the most significant Texas Panhandle culture ruins. Landergin Mesa is a large site with many isolated structures, it is important because of the unique artifacts dating to the Antelope Creek Phase. There are well preserved examples of Borger Cordmarked ceramic vessels from the period. The site also exhibits unique architecture indicative of the Antelope Creek Phase.

Landergin Mesa is a mesa in Oldham County, Texas, in the watershed of the Canadian River. The mesa, relatively modest in scale, rising about 180 feet (55 m) above the valley floor, and has relatively steep sides, features which would have provided a highly defensible position with views across the surrounding countryside. The top layer of the mesa is a thick sandstone, with a sheer drop around much of the mesa's circumference. The mesa's usable surface is covered by a large building remnant with many chambers. An area outside the structure is littered with evidence of domestic occupation, including manos and pottery remains. The site has regularly been subjected to archaeological vandalism by pothunters. The areas in the valley below the mesa, and other nearby landforms, also exhibit evidence of prehistoric human habitation. Radiocarbon dating places the period of occupation around 1300 CE.

== See also ==
- National Register of Historic Places listings in Oldham County, Texas
- List of National Historic Landmarks in Texas

== Additional source ==
Meier, Holly A. (Fall 2007). "TAS Donors Fund Research—Antelope Creek Phase Ceramics" (PDF). Texas Archeology. 51 (4). Texas Archeological Society: 17–18.
