= Vega High School =

Location
- 200 Longhorn Drive; Vega, Texas 79092-0190; United States; 35.249623°N 102.418681°W

Information
- School type: Public high school
- School district: Vega Independent School District
- Principal: Kassidy Rosas
- Staff: 17.26 (FTE)
- Grades: 9-12
- Enrollment: 112 (2023-2024)
- Student to teacher ratio: 6.49
- Colors: Black & Gold
- Slogan: Everyday is a great day to be a Vega Longhorn
- Song: VHS Alma Mater aka Alma Mater
- Fight song: VHS Fight Song aka Go Longhorns Go
- Athletics conference: UIL Class 2A
- Mascot: Longhorn and Lady Longhorns
- Rival: Stratford High School (Football) Wildorado High School (Geographical) Farwell High School (Basketball)
- Website: Vega High School

Vega High School is a public high school located in Vega, Texas and classified as a 2A school by the UIL. It is part of the Vega Independent School District located in southeastern Oldham County.

== Athletics ==
The Vega Longhorns compete in the following sports

- Basketball
- Cross Country
- Football
- Golf
- Powerlifting
- Tennis
- Track and Field
- Volleyball

=== Team State Titles ===
- Boys Basketball -
  - 1979(1A)
- Girls Basketball -
  - 1999(1A)

== Academics ==
=== Individual State Titles ===
- Accounting
  - 2022
  - 2021
- Computer Applications
  - 2022
  - 2019
- Headline Writing
  - 2022
- Prose Interpretation
  - 1992
- Science-Chemistry
  - 2002
  - 1993

=== Team State Titles ===
- Accounting
  - 2022
  - 2019
- Science
  - 2004
  - 2002
  - 1997

== AG Mechanics/FFA ==
The Vega FFA operates as a chapter of the Future Farmers of America. The Ag department focuses heavily on building Agricultural Mechanics projects and shows at different shows across Texas.

== NHS ==
Vega High School operates a chapter of the National Honor Society

== Student Council ==
Vega High School operates a chapter of the Texas Association of Student Councils

== Band ==
The Heartbeat of the Horns marching and concert band serves as the schools only musical arts extracurricular.

VHS Fight Song

Go Longhorns Go

We're going on to football fame

Fight Longhorns Fight

We're gonna fight to win this game

Win Longhorns Win

We're gonna know that score is right

Fight, with all your might

We're gonna win this game tonight

V-H-S

GO-FIGHT-WIN

VHS ALMA MATER

Our strong bond shall ne'er be broken, it shall never die.

Far surpassing wealth unspoken, sealed by friendship nigh.

Lift the chorus ever onward, Black and Gold tonight.

Hail to thee our Alma Mater, HAIL TO VEGA HIGH.
