= Boise, Texas =

- Ghost town
- Location within the State of Texas
- Coordinates: 35°12′52″N 102°51′35″W
- Country: United States
- State: Texas
- County: Oldham
- Elevation: 4,003 ft (1,220 m)

Population (2000)
  - Total: 0
- Time zone: UTC-6 (Central (CST))
  - Summer (DST): UTC-5 (CDT)
- GNIS feature ID: 1379437

Boise is a U.S. ghost town in Oldham County, Texas. It lies east of Glenrio and south of Interstate 40, at an elevation of 4,003 feet (1,220 m).
