= Wildorado Independent School District =

School district in Texas

Location
- Wildorado, TX ESC Region 16 USA

District information
- Type: Public
- Grades: Pre-K through 12th grade
- Superintendent: Troy Duck

Other information
- Website: Wildorado ISD

Wildorado Independent School District is a public school district based in the community of Wildorado, Texas (USA).

Located in Oldham County, the district extends into portions of Deaf Smith and Randall counties.

The district operates one school serving grades Pre-K–6, and accepts transfer students from other districts (going so far as to operate bus service to the Home Depot in Amarillo to pick up students). Students in grades 7–12 attend the neighboring Vega Independent School District unless parents choose another neighboring district.

In 2009, the school district was rated "exemplary" by the Texas Education Agency.
