= 1883 Texas cowboy strike =

Animal herder labor action in Texas

The Cowboy Strike of 1883
- Date: March 23, 1883
- Location: Texas Panhandle, Texas, United States
- Caused by: Cowboy Labor Strike
- Goals: Demanding regular pay instead of annual sums
- Methods: Strike action

The Cowboy Strike of 1883 was a labor action in the Texas Panhandle where 328 cowboys withheld their manual labor from seven major ranches for nearly two months. The cowboys demanded regular pay instead of annual lump sums.

Beginning on March 23, 1883 with demonstrations and intimidation tactics including discharged revolvers, the strike sparked similar actions across the Western United States from 1884 to 1886, marking a period of increased worker militancy among cowboys. The movement ultimately declined due to industry changes, including railroad expansion that eliminated long cattle drives, and several harsh winters that devastated cattle herds.

== History ==
=== Background ===
Cowboys typically earned "thirty and found" ($30 per month plus room and board) and worked schedules of up to 108 hours per week - sixteen hours Monday through Saturday, and twelve hours on Sunday. The strike highlighted the skilled nature of cowboy labor, which required extensive knowledge of geography, water sources, and range management, as noted by the Las Vegas Daily Gazette in 1883. Cowboys were most effective at leveraging their demands during Spring cattle drives when ranchers urgently needed qualified workers and could not easily find replacements.

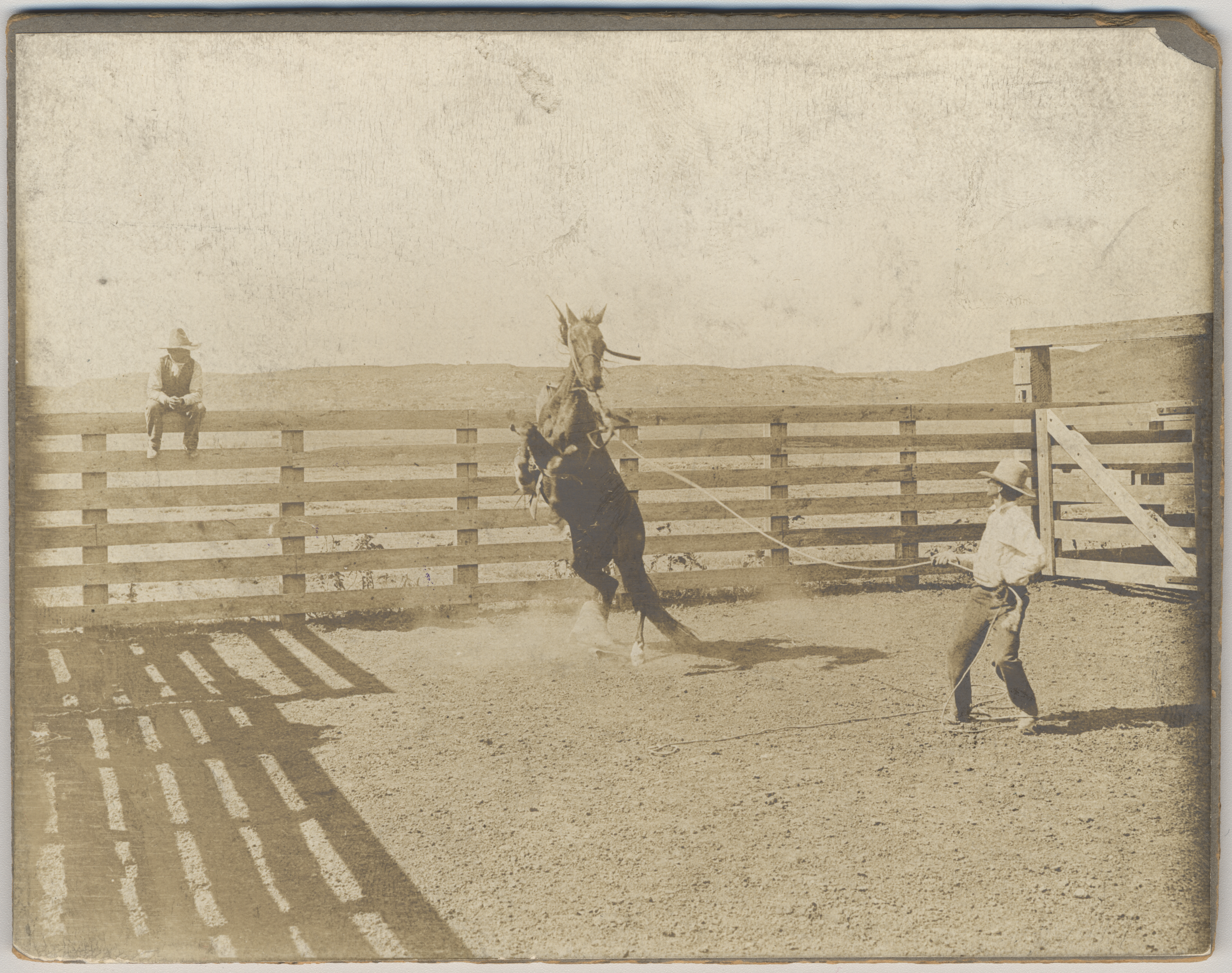
Photograph shows a cowboy breaking or busting a bronc in a corral at the LS Ranch in Texas in 1907

=== Strike initiation and demands ===
The Great Cowboy Strike of 1883, as it is commonly known, was a significant labor action that occurred in the Texas Panhandle involving 328 cowboys. Approximately three-quarters of the county's voting population withheld their labor from seven major ranches. The strike began on March 23, 1883, when cowboys who were preparing a cattle herd for market approached their ranch's general manager with demands for regular pay throughout the year, rather than a single payment at year's end.

The action began by Thomas B. Harris, a foreman at the LS Ranch, who along with two others drafted a formal ultimatum demanding minimum salaries of $50 per month for cowboys and cooks, and $75 for outfit runners. Cowboys from the LS Ranch, owned by the Lee-Scott Cattle Company, were significant participants in the labor action. The formal ultimatum included an explicit threat that those violating these obligations would "suffer the consequences".

=== Strike actions and response ===
When the manager rejected their demands, the cowboys immediately ceased work, returning to headquarters while demonstrating with cowboys yelling and waving their Stetsons. About 328 cowboys from seven major ranches, including the LIT, T-Anchor, LX, LE, and LS, participated in the coordinated walkout just as spring roundup preparations were beginning.

The evening of the strike involved intimidation tactics, including the discharge of revolvers and verbal threats. The following morning, the strikers returned to collect their personal belongings and held what the manager described as "a bit of a pow-wow". They established a strikers' camp, from which they rejected compromise offers like the LIT Ranch's proposed $35 monthly wage for cowboys and $65 for wagon bosses.

== Aftermath and legacy ==
The 1883 strike marked the beginning of a period of increased cowboy militancy that lasted from 1884 to 1886, with similar actions occurring from New Mexico to Wyoming. Ranch owners feared the strike would lead to range wars, pasture burning, and fence cutting. They responded with tactics including blacklisting and armed enforcement, while workers formed associations and cooperative enterprises. The strike lasted approximately two months before ending, after which some former strikers reportedly formed the "Get Even Cattle Co." to conduct cattle rustling operations from across the New Mexico Territory border, beyond Texas jurisdiction.

The aftermath of the strike led to continued tensions, with the LS Ranch taking specific countermeasures against labor organizing and potential cattle rustling. Most notably, the ranch hired Pat Garrett to organize a vigilante group called the LS Rangers to patrol during roundups. The impact of the strike was evident in 1886 when four LS cowboys were killed in Tascosa during a gunfight related to issues from the earlier labor dispute. The ranch was under the management of William McDole Lee during the strike period, who took a hard line against the strikers' demands, offering to pay $100 to wagon bosses and $50 to qualified cowboys, but reverting wages to previous levels after cattle drives were completed. Lee also terminated any workers who complained about the wage reductions.

The strike inspired similar actions across the Western United States. This concerned ranch owners across the region. This labor action occurred within a broader context of changing economic conditions in the American West. This period of labor activism eventually declined due to industry changes, particularly the expansion of railroads which eliminated the need for long cattle drives, and several devastating winters that severely reduced cattle herds.
