= LIT Ranch =

Coordinates: 35.53152°N 102.25408°W

The LIT Ranch is an 56,000-acre (230 km^{2}) ranch located on the Canadian River in the Texas counties of Oldham, Hartley, Moore, and Potter.

The ranch was established by Major George W. Littlefield in 1877. LIT Ranch headquarters were located 4 miles (6 km) east of Tascosa, the second town to be established in the Texas Panhandle. By 1878, it included an area 30 miles north to south and 25 miles east to west, centered on the Canadian River. By 1881, the ranch had grown to include 1,000 square miles and 17,000 head of cattle when it was sold to the Prairie Land and Cattle Company. The company sold 49,022 acres to Lee Bivins in 1908 and another 6,260 acres in June 1909, which included the Tascosa town site. In 1918, Bivins added another 45,448 acres to the ranch.

The ranch is currently owned by the W. H. O'Brien family in Amarillo, Texas.
