= Benonine, Texas =

Unincorporated community in Texas, US

Coordinates: 35°13′37″N 100°00′52″W

Benonine is an unincorporated community in Wheeler County, in the U.S. state of Texas. It is just to the west of the Oklahoma/Texas border, on Interstate 40.

== History ==
Benonine was platted in 1909 when the Chicago, Rock Island and Gulf Railway was extended to that point. The community derives its name from the Benonine Oil and Gas Company.
