= Adrian Independent School District =

School district in Texas, United States

Location
- 301 Matador Dr. Adrian, Texas ESC Region 16 US
- Coordinates: 35°16′31″N 102°39′55″W

District information
- Type: Independent school district
- Grades: Pre-K through 12
- Superintendent: Steve Reynolds
- Schools: 1 (2009–2010)
- NCES District ID: 4807500

Students and staff
- Students: 136 (2010–2011)
- Teachers: 16.17 (2009–2010) (on full-time equivalent (FTE) basis)
- Student–teacher ratio: 8.10 (2009–2010)
- Athletic conference: UIL Class 1A Basketball Division II
- District mascot: Matadors
- Colors: Maroon, White

Other information
- TEA District Accountability Rating for 2011-12: Recognized
- Website: Adrian ISD

The Adrian Independent School District is a school district based in Adrian, Texas, United States.

It includes sections of Oldham County and Deaf Smith County.

== Schools ==
Adrian ISD is a K–12 campus that currently enrolls around 120 students.

- Adrian High School (Grades Pre-K–12)

== Programs ==
=== Athletics ===
Adrian ISD competes in UIL 1A cross country, basketball, track, tennis, and golf.

=== FFA ===
Adrian FFA competes in leadership, career, and speaking development events, in addition to recordbook and scholarship awards, and stock showing.

=== UIL ===
Adrian ISD participates in elementary, junior high, and high school UIL events, including academic, speaking, and theater.

== See also ==
- List of school districts in Texas
- List of high schools in Texas
