= Interstate 40 in Texas =

Section of Interstate Highway in Texas, United States

Interstate 40
- I-40 highlighted in red

Route information
- Maintained by TxDOT
- Length: 177.139 mi (285.078 km)
- Existed: 1959–present
- NHS: Entire route

Major junctions
- West end: I-40 at the New Mexico state line in Glenrio
- US 385 in Vega; I-27 / US 60 / US 87 / US 287 in Amarillo; US 83 in Shamrock
- East end: I-40 at the Oklahoma state line in Benonine

Location
- Country: United States
- State: Texas
- Counties: Deaf Smith, Oldham, Potter, Carson, Gray, Donley, Wheeler

Highway system
- Interstate Highway System; Main; Auxiliary; Suffixed; Business; Future; Highways in Texas; Interstate; US; State; Former; Toll; Loops; Spurs; FM/RM; Park; Rec
← SH 39	→ SH 40

In the US state of Texas, Interstate 40 (I-40 (Note: Some sources use "IH-40", as "IH" is an abbreviation used by the Texas Department of Transportation for Interstate Highways.)) runs west–east through the panhandle in the northwest part of the state. The only large city it passes through is Amarillo, where it meets the north end of I-27. The entire section of I-40 in Texas is designated as a Purple Heart Trail route.

== Route description ==
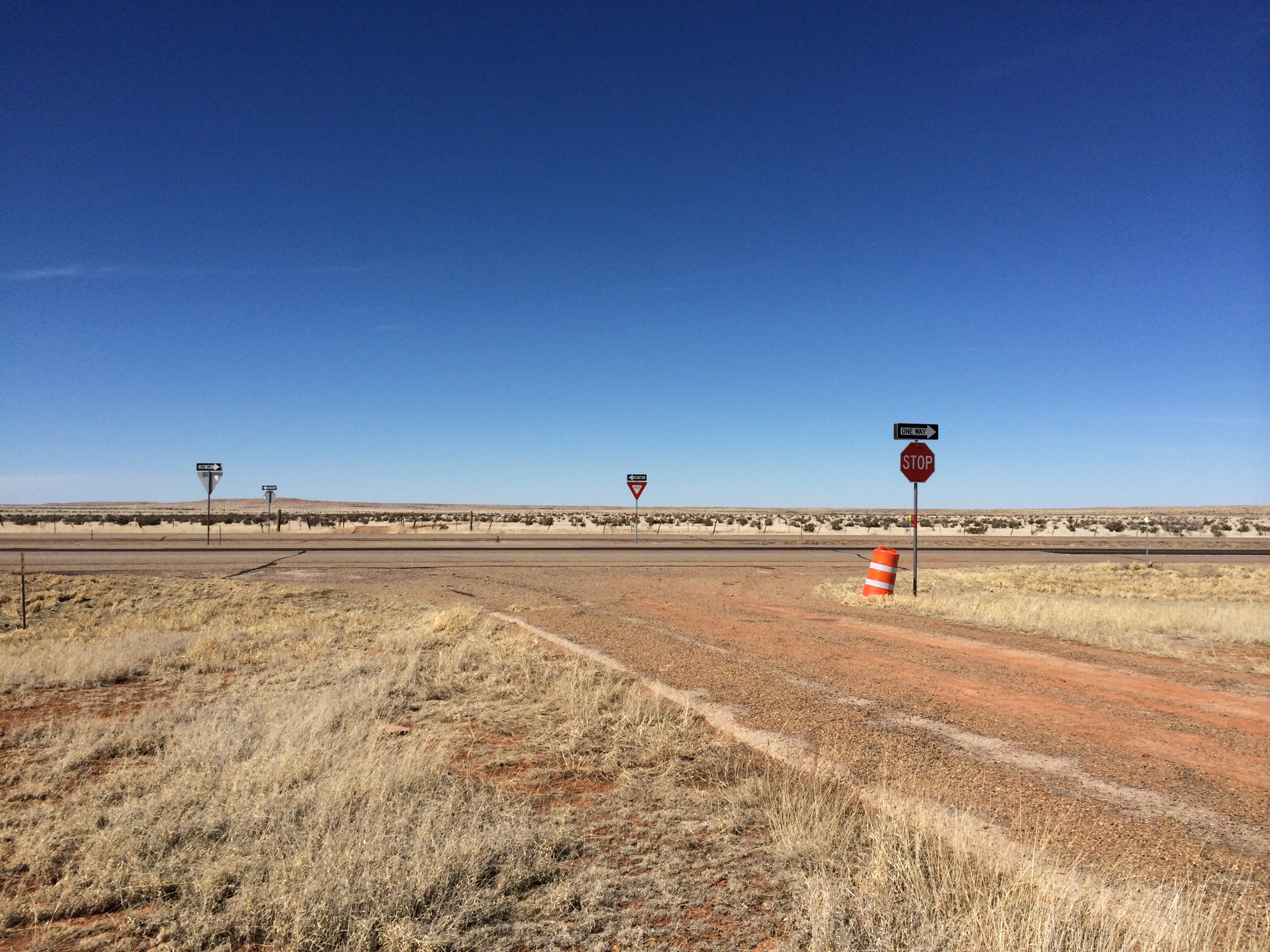
At-grade intersection on I-40 near milemarker 8 in far west Texas

I-40 in Texas is one of a few Interstate Highways with at-grade intersections. The westernmost 16 miles (26 km) of I-40 in Texas, near the New Mexico state line, lacks the frontage roads typical to Texas freeways, and eight driveways for ranches directly intersect the main lanes of I-40, in violation of Interstate standards. The entirety of I-40 in Texas is located in the panhandle.

I-40 enters Texas from New Mexico just north of Glenrio. The highway's first exit, exit 0, is for Business Interstate 40-A (Bus. I-40-A), which serves the town of Glenrio. I-40 briefly runs through Deaf Smith County before entering Oldham County. The Interstate gains frontage roads between exits 15 and 18 and turns from a northeast direction into a straight east direction. I-40 bypasses the town of Adrian before turning southeast. I-40 next bypasses the town of Vega, where it meets with US 385 at exit 36. The Interstate briefly runs in an east direction through the town of Wildorado before turning back to the southeast. I-40 has a mostly rural route before becoming more suburban in Bushland, with housing developments becoming visible from the highway. The Interstate passes by Cadillac Ranch before the Hope Road interchange and enters the city limits of Amarillo just west of State Highway Loop 335 (Loop 335). I-40 expands from four lanes to six at Loop 335 and runs through a heavily developed area of the city. Near downtown, the highway serves as the northern terminus for I-27 at a turbine interchange and begins an overlap with US 287.

I-40 runs through eastern Amarillo, passing by the American Quarter Horse Hall of Fame and The Big Texan Steak Ranch. Development along the route begins to lessen after South Eastern Street as the highway passes near Rick Husband Amarillo International Airport. US 287 leaves I-40 at exit 78 as the Interstate leaves the city limits of Amarillo. The highway runs primarily through rural farmland after leaving the city and enters the town of Groom, passing near a 19-story cross and a leaning water tower. East of Groom, I-40 has an overlap with State Highway 70 (SH 70) between exits 121 and 124. After the overlap with SH 70 ends, the terrain along the Interstate begins to change from flat plains to a rolling canyon ridge with an observation point near Alanreed. I-40 returns to flatland again after the town of McLean and bypasses the town of Shamrock before entering Oklahoma near Texola.

== History ==
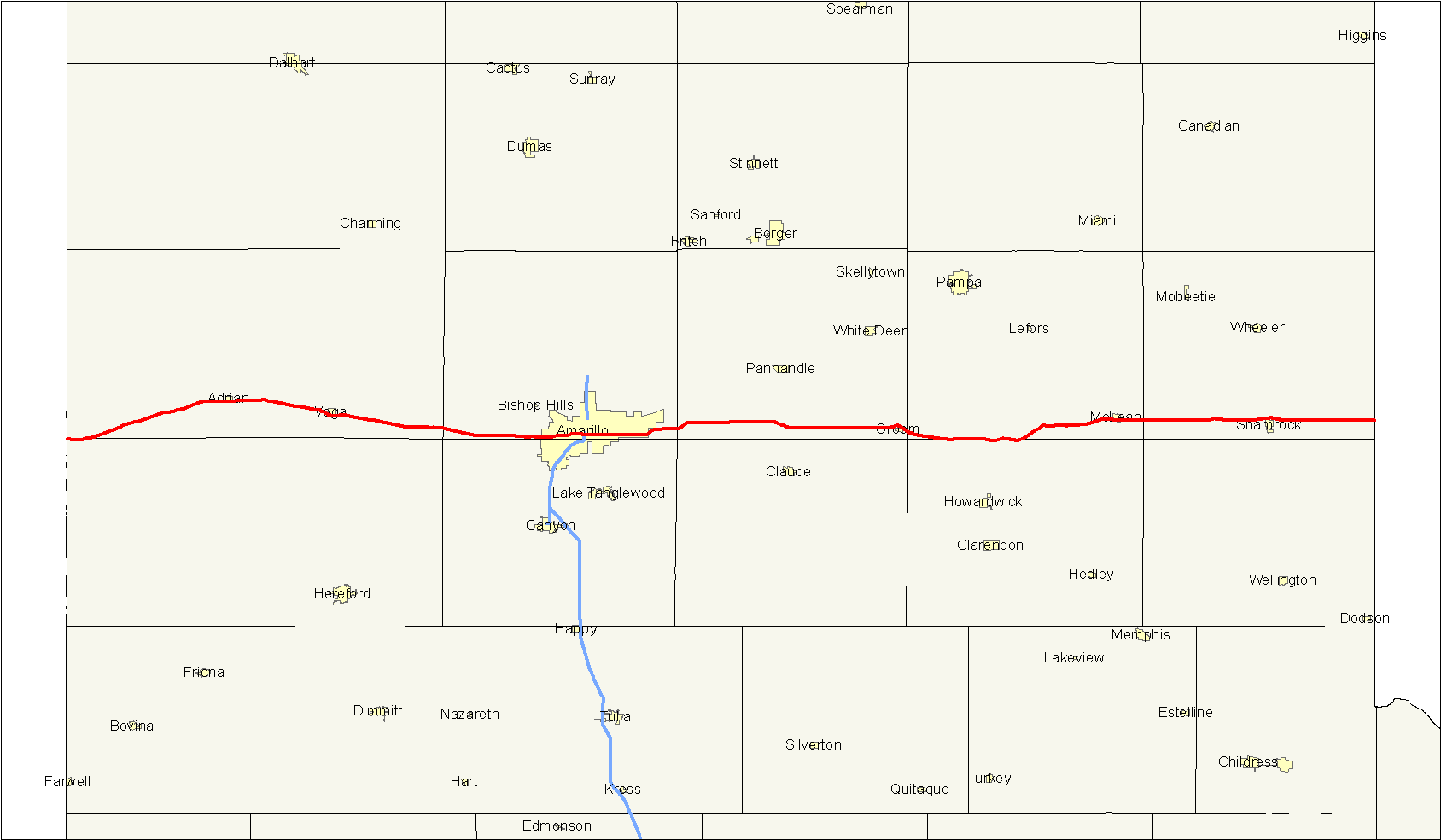
Map of the Historic Route 66, now Interstate 40, in Texas.

Before the U.S. Highway system, this system of interconnected highway from New Mexico to Oklahoma was part of the Texas highway system and a portion of the Ozark Trails which closely paralleled the Chicago, Rock Island and Pacific Railway. When the United States Numbered Highway system was introduced in 1926, U.S. Highway 66 (US 66) across the Texas Panhandle was designated along existing roads in the Texas highway network. The entire route was paved by 1938. There have been various realignments, including one in 1959, to allow expansion of the Amarillo Air Force Base.

In 1956, the Interstate Highway Act designated US 66 through Texas as a section of highway eligible for limited access upgrades.

During the next 20 years, most of the highway was upgraded in place to keep construction costs low. With the limited access of the Interstates, towns on the highway had to be bypassed. Most towns requested to remain as close to the new highway as possible to minimize tourism losses. Bypassed towns included Glenrio, Adrian, Vega, Conway, Groom, Jericho, Alanreed, McLean, and Shamrock. A new routing along the south end of downtown Amarillo was also built, connecting with the already-built expressway leading south from downtown toward Canyon. In 1985, the entire designation of US 66 was removed as the entire route had been displaced by I-40.

== Future ==
In 2015, the Texas Department of Transportation (TxDOT) published the plans for the all new Loop 335 section that will encircle the city of Amarillo. TxDOT has planned multiple multilevel interchanges that intersect with I-40. The first, on the eastside of Amarillo, is a multilevel interchange that will provide access to both directions of I-40 and Loop 335. The second interchange with I-40, however, will be a full stack interchange. A new mainlane bridge that will accommodate up to six lanes is also in the works for I-40 near Helium Road, providing easier access to the new freeway. Although construction started in 2016, the project was not expected to be complete until 2022.

== Exit list ==
County	Location	mi	km	Exit	Destinations	Notes
Deaf Smith	Glenrio	0.00	0.00		I-40 west – Albuquerque	New Mexico state line
Deaf Smith	Glenrio	0.48	0.77	0	I-40 BL – Glenrio	
Oldham		15.35	24.70	15	Ivy Road	
Oldham		17.98	28.94	18	FM 2858 (Gruhlkey Road)	
Oldham	Adrian	22.03	35.45	22	I-40 BL – Adrian	
Oldham	Adrian	23.04	37.08	23	SH 214 south	No westbound entrance; eastern terminus of BL-40
Oldham		28.62	46.06	28	FM 29 – Landergin	Signed as simply "Landergin"
Oldham	Vega	35.02	56.36	35	I-40 BL east / FM 3319 – Vega	
Oldham	Vega	36.35	58.50	36	US 385 – Vega	
Oldham	Vega	37.62	60.54	37	I-40 BL west – Vega	
Oldham		42.09	67.74	42	Everett Road	
Oldham		49.37	79.45	49	FM 809 – Wildorado	
Potter		54.43	87.60	54	Adkisson Road	
Potter		57.32	92.25	57	RM 2381 – Bushland	
Potter		60.35	97.12	60	Arnot Road	
Potter		62.42	100.46	62A	Hope Road	Access to Cadillac Ranch
Potter	Amarillo	62.42	100.46	62B	I-40 BL east (Amarillo Boulevard)	Eastbound exit and westbound entrance
Potter	Amarillo	63.22	101.74	63	Loop 335 / Helium Road	Eastbound access via exit 62B
Potter	Amarillo	64.50	103.80	64	Soncy Road	
Potter	Amarillo	65.46	105.35	65	Coulter Street	Access to Northwest Texas Hospital and Baptist Saint Anthony's
Potter	Amarillo	66.52	107.05	66	Bell Street / Avondale Street / Olsen Boulevard	
Potter	Amarillo	67.56	108.73	67	Western Street / Avondale Street / Olsen Boulevard	
Potter	Amarillo	68.19	109.74	68A	Julian Boulevard / Paramount Boulevard	
Potter	Amarillo	68.64	110.47	68B	Georgia Street / Crockett Street	
Potter	Amarillo	69.11	111.22	69A	Crockett Street	Westbound exit and eastbound entrance
Potter	Amarillo	69.64	112.07	69B	Washington Street – Amarillo College	
Potter	Amarillo	70.30	113.14	70	I-27 south / US 60 / US 87 / US 287 north – Canyon, Lubbock, Dumas, Pampa	West end of US 287 overlap; I-27 exit 653B; current northern terminus of I-27
Potter	Amarillo	70.88– 71.42	114.07– 114.94	71	Ross-Osage Street / Arthur Street	
Potter	Amarillo	72.07	115.99	72A	Nelson Street / Quarter Horse Drive (Loop 362 north)	Access to the American Quarter Horse Hall of Fame
Potter	Amarillo	72.66	116.93	72B	Grand Street / Bolton Street	
Potter	Amarillo	73.60	118.45	73	Eastern Street / Bolton Street	
Potter	Amarillo	74.54– 74.66	119.96– 120.15	74	Whitaker Road	
Potter	Amarillo	75.66	121.76	75	Loop 335 (Lakeside Drive)	
Potter	Amarillo	76.67	123.39	76	Spur 468 (Airport Boulevard) – Amarillo International Airport	
Potter	Amarillo	77.65	124.97	77	FM 1258 (Pullman Road)	
Potter	Amarillo	78.49	126.32	78	US 287 south – Fort Worth	East end of US 287 overlap; eastbound exit and westbound entrance
Potter		79.94	128.65	80	Spur 228 – Amarillo College East Campus	
Potter		80.97	130.31	81	FM 1912	
Carson		85.20	137.12	85	Durrett Road	Eastbound exit only
Carson		85.39	137.42	85	I-40 BL west (Amarillo Boulevard) / FM 2575	No eastbound exit
Carson		87.56	140.91	87	FM 2373	
Carson		89.58	144.17	89	FM 2161	
Carson		96.68	155.59	96	SH 207 – Conway, Panhandle	
Carson		97.80	157.39	98	SH 207 south – Claude	Westbound exit and eastbound entrance
Carson		104.79	168.64	105	FM 2880	
Carson		108.82	175.13	109	FM 294	
Carson	Groom	110.26– 110.50	177.45– 177.83	110	I-40 BL east – Groom	
Carson	Groom	111.85	180.01	112	FM 295	
Carson	Groom	112.93	181.74	113	FM 2300	
Gray		114.05	183.55	114	I-40 BL west – Groom	
Gray–Donley county line		120.62	194.12	121	SH 70 north – Pampa	West end of SH 70 overlap
Gray–Donley county line		124.21	199.90	124	SH 70 south – Clarendon	East end of SH 70 overlap
Donley		127.71	205.53	128	FM 2477	
Gray		131.60	211.79	132	Johnson Ranch Road	
Gray	Alanreed	135.02– 135.65	217.29– 218.31	135	Loop 271 to FM 291 – Alanreed	
Gray	McLean	141.01	226.93	141	I-40 BL east – McLean	Eastbound exit and westbound entrance
Gray	McLean	142.25	228.93	142	SH 273 / FM 3143 – McLean	
Gray	McLean	143.50	230.94	143	I-40 BL west – McLean	Westbound exit and eastbound entrance
Gray–Wheeler county line		146.26	235.38	146	County Line Road	
Wheeler		148.26	238.60	148	FM 1443 (Kellerville Road)	
Wheeler		152.26	245.04	152	FM 453 (Pakan Road)	
Wheeler		157.32	253.18	157	FM 1547 / FM 2474 / FM 3075 – Lela	
Wheeler	Shamrock	160.96– 161.51	259.04– 259.93	161	I-40 BL east – Shamrock	Eastbound exit and westbound entrance
Wheeler	Shamrock	162.65	261.76	163	US 83 – Shamrock, Wheeler, Wellington	
Wheeler	Shamrock	163.94	263.84	164	I-40 BL west – Shamrock	
Wheeler	Shamrock	167.40	269.40	167	FM 2168 (Daberry Road) – Shamrock	
Wheeler		169.40	272.62	169	FM 1802 (Carbon Black Road)	
Wheeler	Benonine	175.42	282.31	176	Spur 30 east – Texola	Eastbound exit only
Wheeler	Benonine	176.04	283.31		Frontage Road	Westbound entrance only
Wheeler		176.74	284.44		I-40 east – Oklahoma City	Oklahoma state line
1.000 mi = 1.609 km; 1.000 km = 0.621 mi: Concurrency terminus; Incomplete access

== Business routes and old alignments ==

I-40 has seven business routes in Texas, all of which are old alignments of US 66. A number of other old alignments of US 66 are also present; most are marked on guide signs on I-40.

- Bus. I-40-A (formerly State Highway Spur 504 (Spur 504)) is a business spur that runs from I-40 at Glenrio, just east of the New Mexico state line, southwest to the border. In New Mexico, the road forks—the later paved alignment (c. 1952) has been cut by I-40, and the earlier alignment west to San Jon is now a dirt road that had been paved when it was US 66 prior to 1952, but the paving was later removed by Quay County, New Mexico, commissioners due to high maintenance costs and low traffic volumes. Old US 66 (current Bus. I-40-A) through Glenrio was bypassed in 1973 by I-40.
- Bus. I-40-B (formerly Loop 550) is a business loop through Adrian. The road was bypassed c. 1969 by I-40 and carried US 66 until its 1985 decommissioning.
- Bus. I-40-C (formerly Loop 551) is a business loop through Vega. The road was bypassed c. 1973 by I-40 and carried US 66 until its 1985 decommissioning.
- Bus. I-40-D (formerly Loop 552) is a long business loop through Amarillo. An older alignment—Loop 279—carried Business U.S. Highway 66 (Bus. US 66). East of Amarillo, Farm to Market Road 2575 (FM 2575) is old US 66, rerouted to today's Bus. I-40-D in 1958 by the construction of Amarillo International Airport. Present Bus. I-40-D was bypassed in 1968 by I-40 and carried US 66 until its 1985 decommissioning.
- FM 2161 and SH 207 carry old US 66 through Conway. The road was bypassed c. 1966 by I-40 and carried US 66 until its 1985 decommissioning.
- Bus. I-40-F (formerly Loop 554) is a business loop through Groom. The road was bypassed c. 1980 by I-40 and carried US 66 until its 1985 decommissioning.
- The short Loop 271, in addition to providing access to FM 291, is old US 66 through Alanreed. The road was bypassed in 1953 by US 66, but the bypass was not upgraded to a freeway until c. 1982.
- Bus. I-40-H (formerly Loop 555) is a business loop through McLean. The road was bypassed c. 1984 by I-40 and carried US 66 until its 1985 decommissioning.
- Bus. I-40-J (formerly Loop 556) is a business loop through Shamrock. The road was bypassed c. 1973 by I-40 and carried US 66 until its 1985 decommissioning.
- Spur 30 is a short route from I-40 just west of the Oklahoma state line southeast to the border. In Oklahoma, the road is unnumbered though Texola, though it picks up I-40 Bus. at exit 5 to run through Erick. The road was bypassed c. 1972 by I-40 and carried US 66 until 1976 when it was moved onto I-40 in the area.

== See also ==
- List of Interstate Highways in Texas

== Notes ==
Interstate 40
Previous state: New Mexico	Texas	Next state: Oklahoma
