= Adrian, Texas =

- City
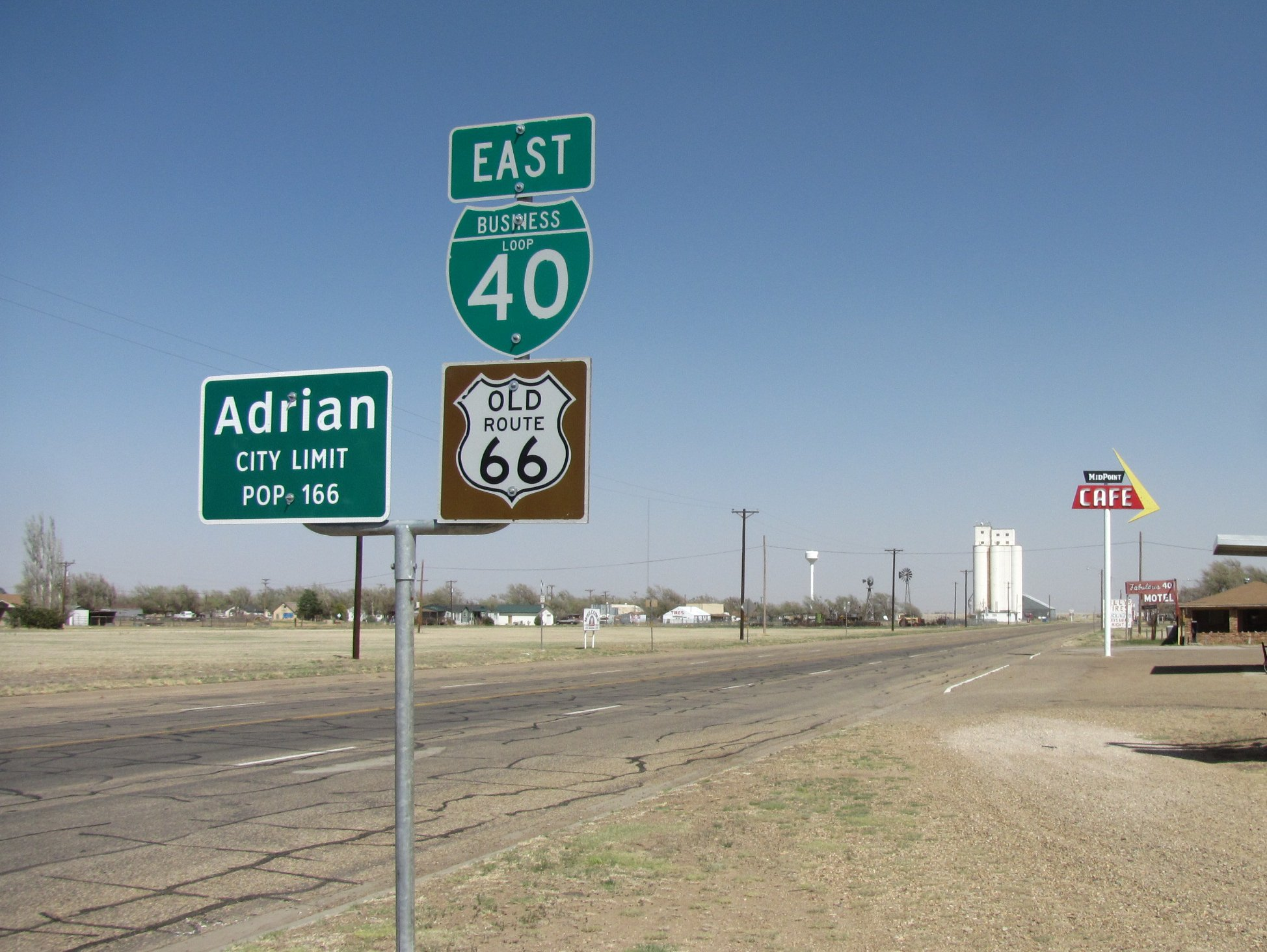
- Entering Adrian
- Interactive map of Adrian, Texas
- Coordinates: 35°16′27″N 102°40′02″W
- Country: United States
- State: Texas
- County: Oldham

Area
  - Total: 0.47 sq mi (1.22 km^{2})
  - Land: 0.47 sq mi (1.22 km^{2})
  - Water: 0 sq mi (0.00 km^{2})
- Elevation: 4,042 ft (1,232 m)

Population (2020)
  - Total: 128
  - Density: 272.3/sq mi (105.15/km^{2})
- Time zone: UTC-6 (Central (CST))
  - Summer (DST): UTC-5 (CDT)
- ZIP code: 79001
- Area code: 806
- FIPS code: 48-01324
- GNIS feature ID: 2409665

Adrian is a city in Oldham County, Texas, United States. The population was 128 at the 2020 census, down from 166 at the 2010 census. The city is intersected by Interstate 40 and Texas State Highway 214.

== Geography ==
Adrian is situated along Interstate 40 (formerly U.S. Route 66) in south central Oldham County, approximately 47 miles (76 km) west of Amarillo. Adrian is the geo-mathematical midpoint of Route 66, positioned 1,139 miles (1,833 km) from both Chicago, Illinois and Los Angeles, California.

According to the United States Census Bureau, the city has a total area of 0.9 square miles (2.3 km^{2}).

=== U.S. Route 66 ===
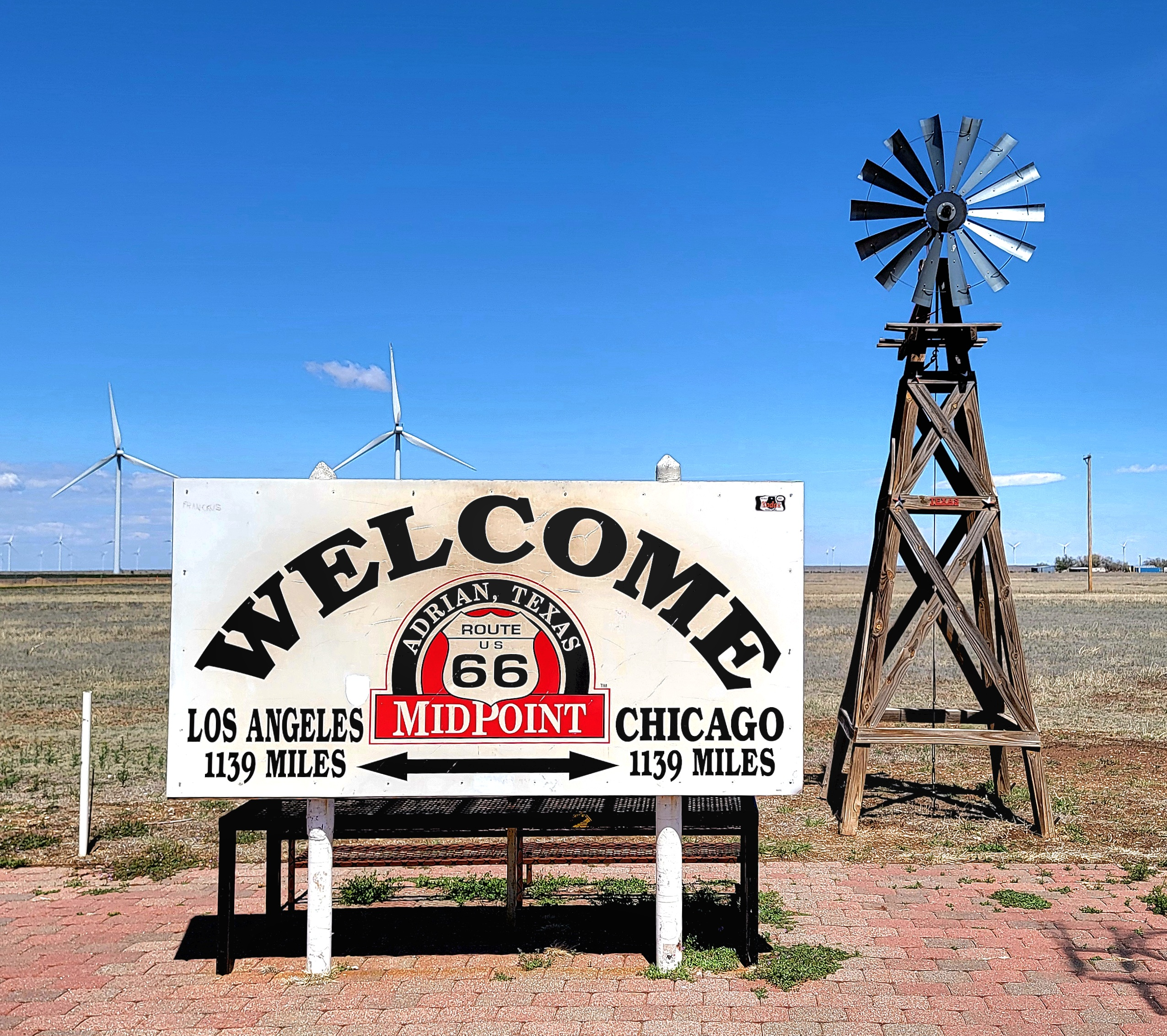
Sign at Midpoint Café

Adrian, Texas bills itself as the midway point between Chicago and Los Angeles on historic Route 66. The city has signage proudly declaring "← Los Angeles 1139 miles — Chicago 1139 miles →" to travellers on the old highway who arrive from as far afield as Europe. The "US 66 midpoint" branding was adopted in 1995 on the advice of travel author and Route 66 Association founder Tom Snyder. Fran Houser, owner of the Midpoint Café restaurant, antique and souvenir shop from 1990 until 2012, is the basis for Flo of the "Flo's V-8 Café" diner in Cars. The café, built in 1928 and located between a motel and a former filling station, operated 24 hours a day during Route 66's heyday.

Other US 66 attractions in Adrian include a Lions Antique Museum (which displays farm and ranch equipment from the 1920s to 1950s), a Windmill (which draws water from a well drilled by the Rock Island Railroad), and an Antique Ranch (which offers antiques and barbecue). The long-closed Bent Door Café and trading post, built by Bob Harris in 1947 on the site of the 1940s Kozy Kottage Kamp, incorporates portions of a former air traffic control tower decommissioned after World War II; the tower windows originally slanted toward the runway, so the door is bent to match. The most recent Bent Door restoration efforts were made in 2009.

== History ==
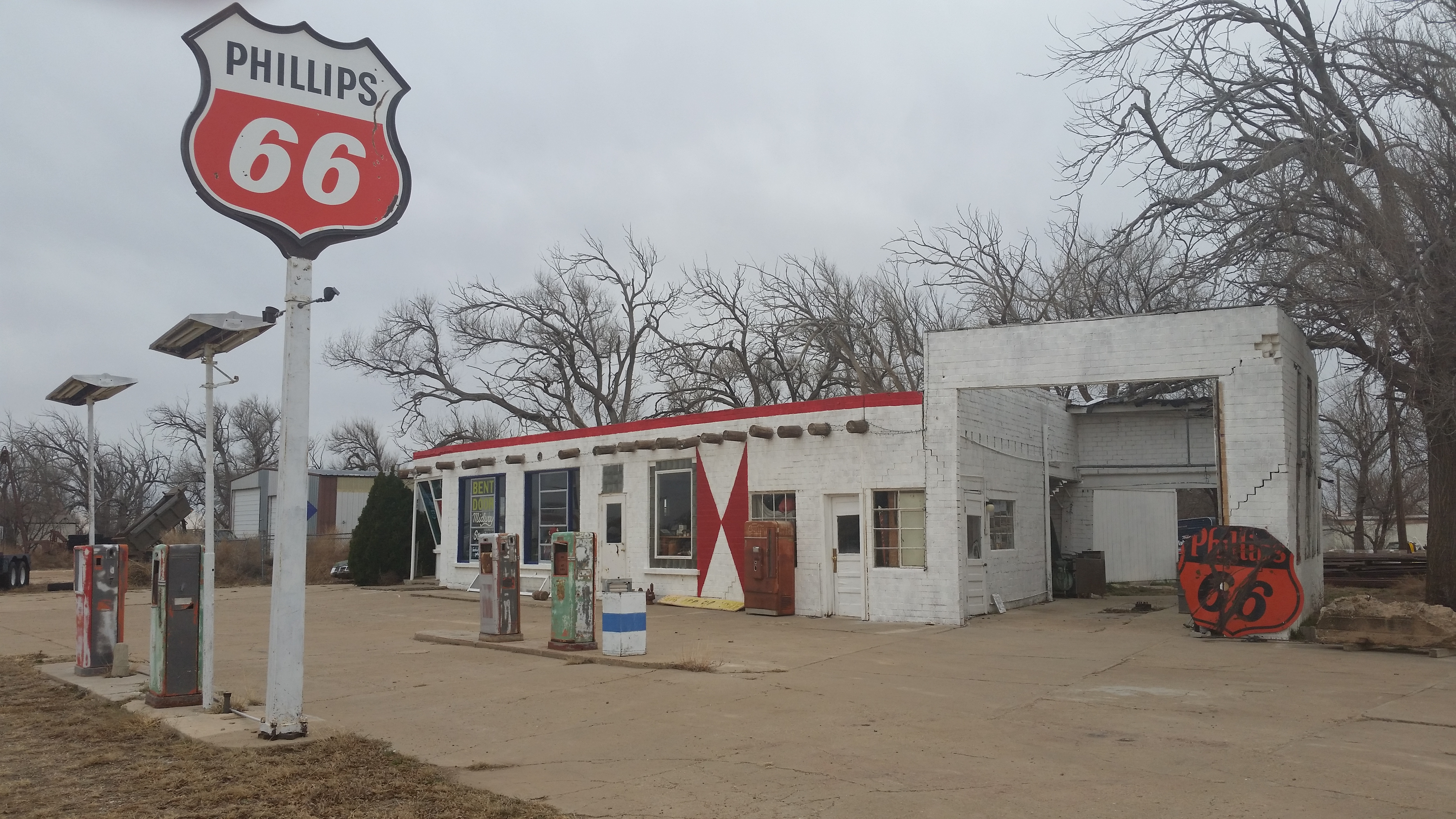
Remnants of more prosperous times along Route 66 in Adrian

The community originated in 1900, when the Rock Island Railroad survey marked the site as a future station and shipping point. Former Texas Ranger Calvin G. Aten was one of the area's first settlers. He built a dugout west of the site for his family. The town was named after another early settler, Adrian Cullen. In 1909, the Chicago, Rock Island and Gulf Railway was completed through Adrian. The Iowa-based American-Canadian Land and Townsite Company attracted prospective farmers and businessmen to the community. J.P. Collier set up a printing press and dug a water well, running water pipe for the town's first infrastructure. By 1910, Adrian had a post office, several stores, and a newspaper – the Adrian Eagle. Approximately 50 people were living in the community in 1915. The slow growth rate was attributed to a lengthy drought and the difficulty of maintaining a sufficient water supply. Adrian became a stopping point for travelers on Route 66 and a shipping point for area wheat growers. A grain elevator was built in 1929 and the community organized a volunteer fire department during the 1940s.

Adrian was incorporated in 1953 and adopted a mayor-council form of government. During the latter half of the 20th century, the population hovered around 220. By 2000, Adrian's population had declined to 159. It is one of two incorporated places in Oldham County; the other is the city of Vega.

== Demographics ==
Historical population
Census	Pop.	Note	%±
1960	258		—
1970	228		−11.6%
1980	222		−2.6%
1990	220		−0.9%
2000	159		−27.7%
2010	166		4.4%
2020	128		−22.9%
U.S. Decennial Census

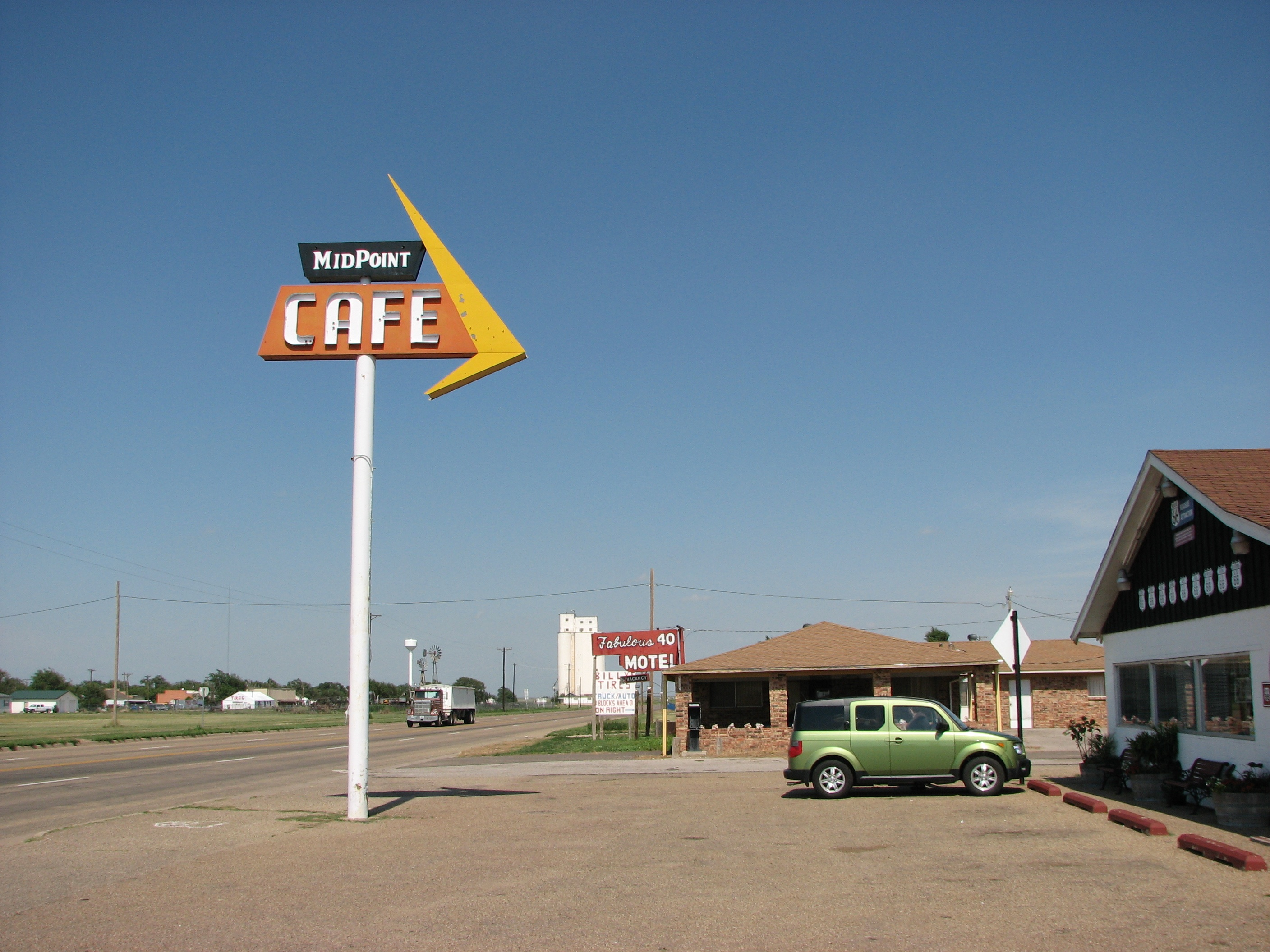

=== 2020 census ===
As of the 2020 census, Adrian had a population of 128, 47 households, and 36 families residing in the city. The median age was 46.0 years; 21.9% of residents were under the age of 18 and 19.5% of residents were 65 years of age or older.

For every 100 females there were 93.9 males, and for every 100 females age 18 and over there were 104.1 males age 18 and over.

There were 47 households in Adrian, of which 29.8% had children under the age of 18 living in them. Of all households, 61.7% were married-couple households, 19.1% were households with a male householder and no spouse or partner present, and 17.0% were households with a female householder and no spouse or partner present. About 14.9% of all households were made up of individuals and 6.4% had someone living alone who was 65 years of age or older.

There were 76 housing units, of which 38.2% were vacant. Among occupied housing units, 76.6% were owner-occupied and 23.4% were renter-occupied. The homeowner vacancy rate was 5.1% and the rental vacancy rate was 18.8%.

0% of residents lived in urban areas, while 100.0% lived in rural areas.

Racial composition as of the 2020 census
Race	Percent
White	93.8%
Black or African American	0%
American Indian and Alaska Native	0.8%
Asian	0%
Native Hawaiian and Other Pacific Islander	0%
Some other race	3.9%
Two or more races	1.6%
Hispanic or Latino (of any race)	11.7%

Adrian racial composition (NH = Non-Hispanic) (Note: Note: the US Census treats Hispanic/Latino as an ethnic category. This table excludes Latinos from the racial categories and assigns them to a separate category. Hispanics/Latinos can be of any race.)
Race	Number	Percentage
White (NH)	111	86.72%
Mixed/Multi-Racial (NH)	2	1.56%
Hispanic or Latino	15	11.72%
Total	128	

=== 2000 census ===
As of the census of 2000, there were 159 people, 72 households, and 48 families residing in the city. The population density was 179.9 inhabitants per square mile (69.5/km^{2}). There were 82 housing units at an average density of 92.8 per square mile (35.8/km^{2}). The racial makeup of the city was 82.39% White, 1.26% Native American, 16.35% from other races. Hispanic or Latino of any race were 21.38% of the population.

There were 72 households, out of which 23.6% had children under the age of 18 living with them, 54.2% were married couples living together, 9.7% had a female householder with no husband present, and 33.3% were non-families. 31.9% of all households were made up of individuals, and 12.5% had someone living alone who was 65 years of age or older. The average household size was 2.21 and the average family size was 2.79.

In the city, the population was spread out, with 21.4% under the age of 18, 6.3% from 18 to 24, 22.0% from 25 to 44, 30.2% from 45 to 64, and 20.1% who were 65 years of age or older. The median age was 46 years. For every 100 females, there were 91.6 males. For every 100 females age 18 and over, there were 86.6 males.

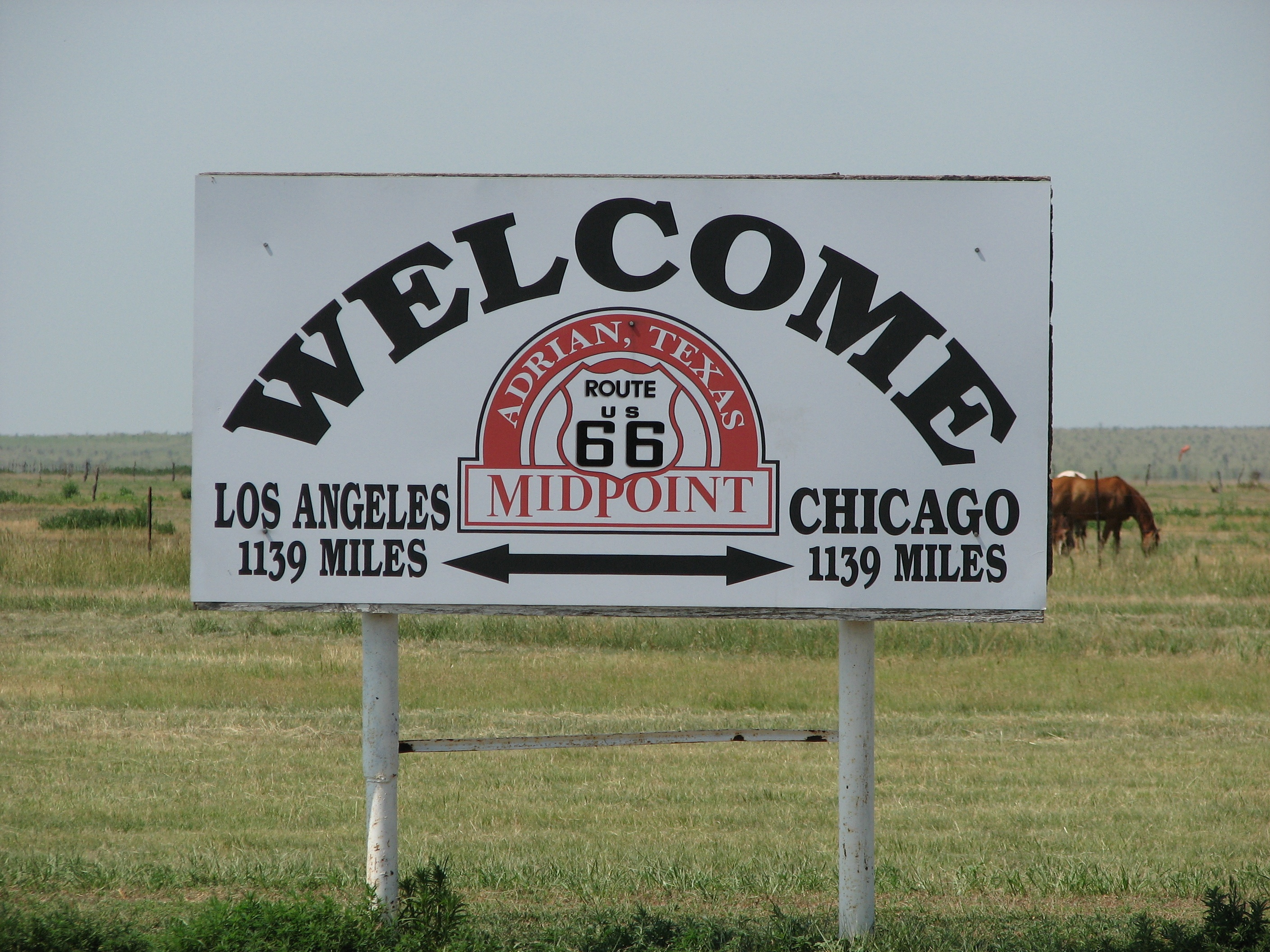

The median income for a household in the city was $27,083, and the median income for a family was $33,750. Males had a median income of $33,333 versus $21,875 for females. The per capita income for the city was $17,966. About 13.6% of families and 24.1% of the population were below the poverty line, including 33.3% of those under the age of 18 and 21.7% of those 65 or over.

== Education ==
Adrian is zoned to schools in the Adrian Independent School District.

== Climate ==
According to the Köppen Climate Classification system, Adrian has a semi-arid climate, abbreviated "BSk" on climate maps.
