= Wildorado, Texas =

Wildorado
- Unincorporated community
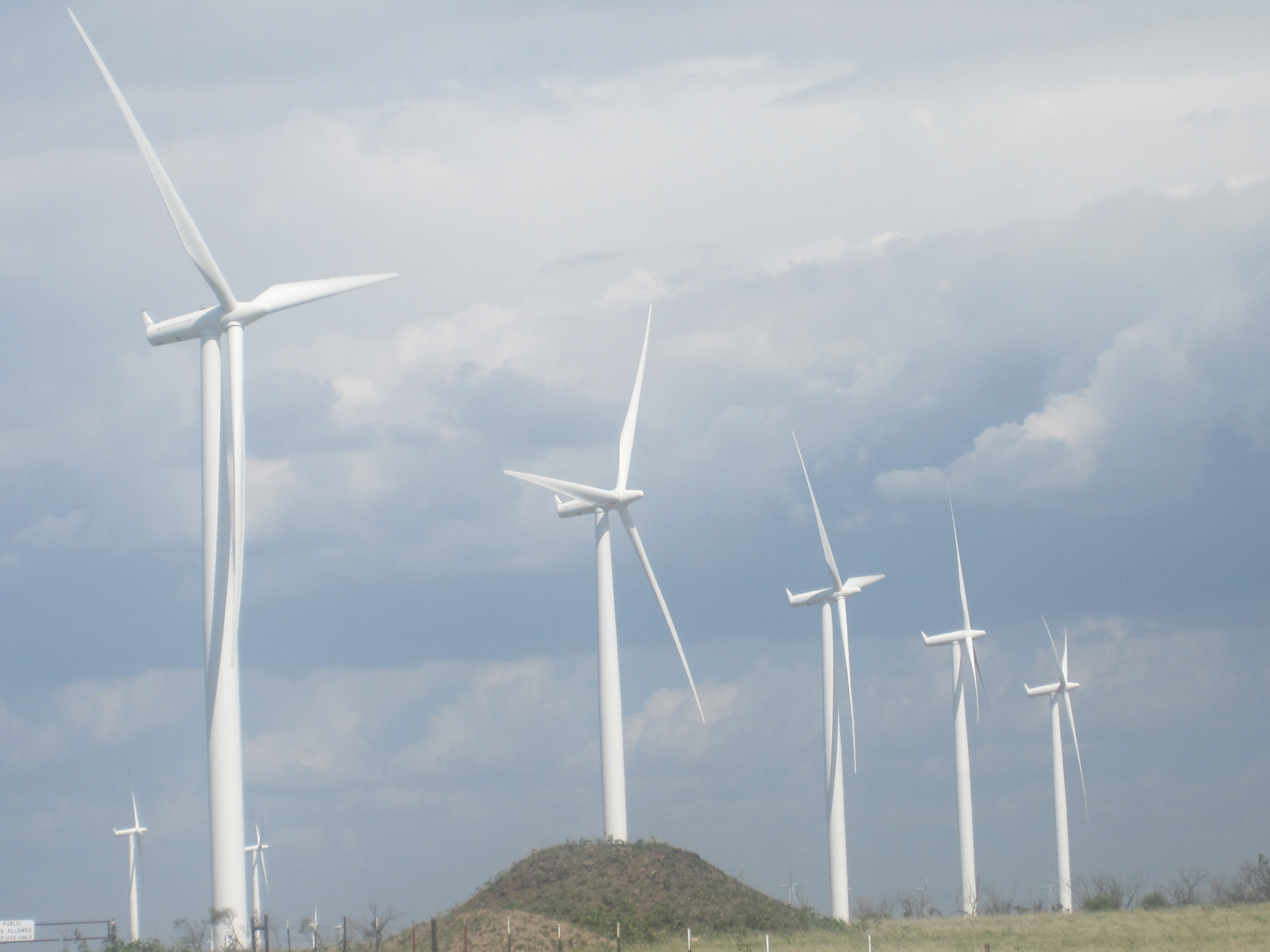
- Wildorado Wind Ranch, photographed from U.S. Route 385

- Location within the state of Texas Wildorado (the United States)
- Coordinates: 35°12′33″N 102°12′20″W
- Country: United States
- State: Texas
- County: Oldham

Area
  - Total: 2.35 sq mi (6.09 km^{2})
- Elevation: 3,924 ft (1,196 m)
- Time zone: UTC-6 (Central (CST))
  - Summer (DST): UTC-5 (CDT)
- ZIP codes: 79098
- GNIS feature ID: 2805826

Wildorado (/ˌwɪldəˈreɪdoʊ/ WIL-də-RAY-doh) is an unincorporated community in Oldham County, Texas, United States. As of the 2020 census, Wildorado had a population of 201.

== Geography ==
Wildorado is located along FM 809 south of and Main Street north of Interstate 40, east of Vega, the county seat of Oldham County. The nearest large city is Amarillo, located approximately 20 miles east of Wildorado.

== History ==
Named for nearby Wildorado Creek, the community was founded in 1900 as a railway town along the Chicago, Rock Island and Gulf Railroad. It was first settled by Eugene Binford and John R. Goodman, who ranched in the area before 1900. A post office was established in 1904. In 1908, the railroad was completed and a town site was laid out. Goodman organized the Wildorado State Bank and built the Wildorado Hotel. A newspaper, the Wildorado Progress, began publication in 1909. By 1915, Wildorado had an estimated population of 100. During the 1920s and 1930s, the community endured droughts and dust storms. In 1936, Wildorado had a population of 57 with seven businesses. That figure increased to approximately 125 residents in the late 1940s. The gradual evolution of the Ozark Trail (Route 66) into Interstate 40 encouraged growth. After World War II, when travel became a popular pastime, Wildorado responded with services along its portion of Route 66 and the population rose to over 200 by the late 1950s. The formation of the Wildorado Water Supply Corporation in 1976-77 ensured a rural water supply and irrigation wells. During the latter half of the twentieth century, the population hovered around 180. Although Wildorado is unincorporated, it has a post office, with the ZIP code of 79098.

== Demographics ==
Historical population
Census	Pop.	Note	%±
2020	201		—
U.S. Decennial Census; 1850–1900 1910; 1920 1930 1940; 1950 1960 1970; 1980 1990 2000; 2010 2020

According to the Handbook of Texas, the community had an estimated population of 180 in 2000. Wildorado first appeared as a census designated place in the 2020 U.S. census.

=== 2020 Census ===
Wildorado CDP, Texas – Racial and ethnic composition Note: the US Census treats Hispanic/Latino as an ethnic category. This table excludes Latinos from the racial categories and assigns them to a separate category. Hispanics/Latinos may be of any race.
Race / Ethnicity (NH = Non-Hispanic)	Pop 2020	% 2020
White alone (NH)	149	74.13%
Black or African American alone (NH)	1	0.50%
Native American or Alaska Native alone (NH)	0	0.00%
Asian alone (NH)	1	0.50%
Native Hawaiian or Pacific Islander alone (NH)	0	0.00%
Other race alone (NH)	0	0.00%
Mixed race or Multiracial (NH)	22	10.95%
Hispanic or Latino (any race)	28	13.93%
Total	201	100.00%

As of the 2020 United States census, there were 201 people, 63 households, and 41 families residing in the CDP.

== Education ==
Public education is provided by the Wildorado Independent School District. Troy Duck is the district's superintendent. The district has a single campus that serves students in grades prekindergarten through 12th. Wildorado ISD is rated an Exemplary District by the Texas Education Agency. Wildorado Elementary accepts transfers and provides transportation by bus for accepted students. Students in grades 9-12 attend one of the nearby neighboring districts. The new high school that is in operation will expand a grade each year until they run through the 12th grade. The first graduating class was in 2021.

== Cultural references ==
Indie folk rock band Wilderado chose to rename themselves to an altered version of the community's name after driving by Wildorado on a late-night drive while on tour.
