= Vega, Texas =

- City
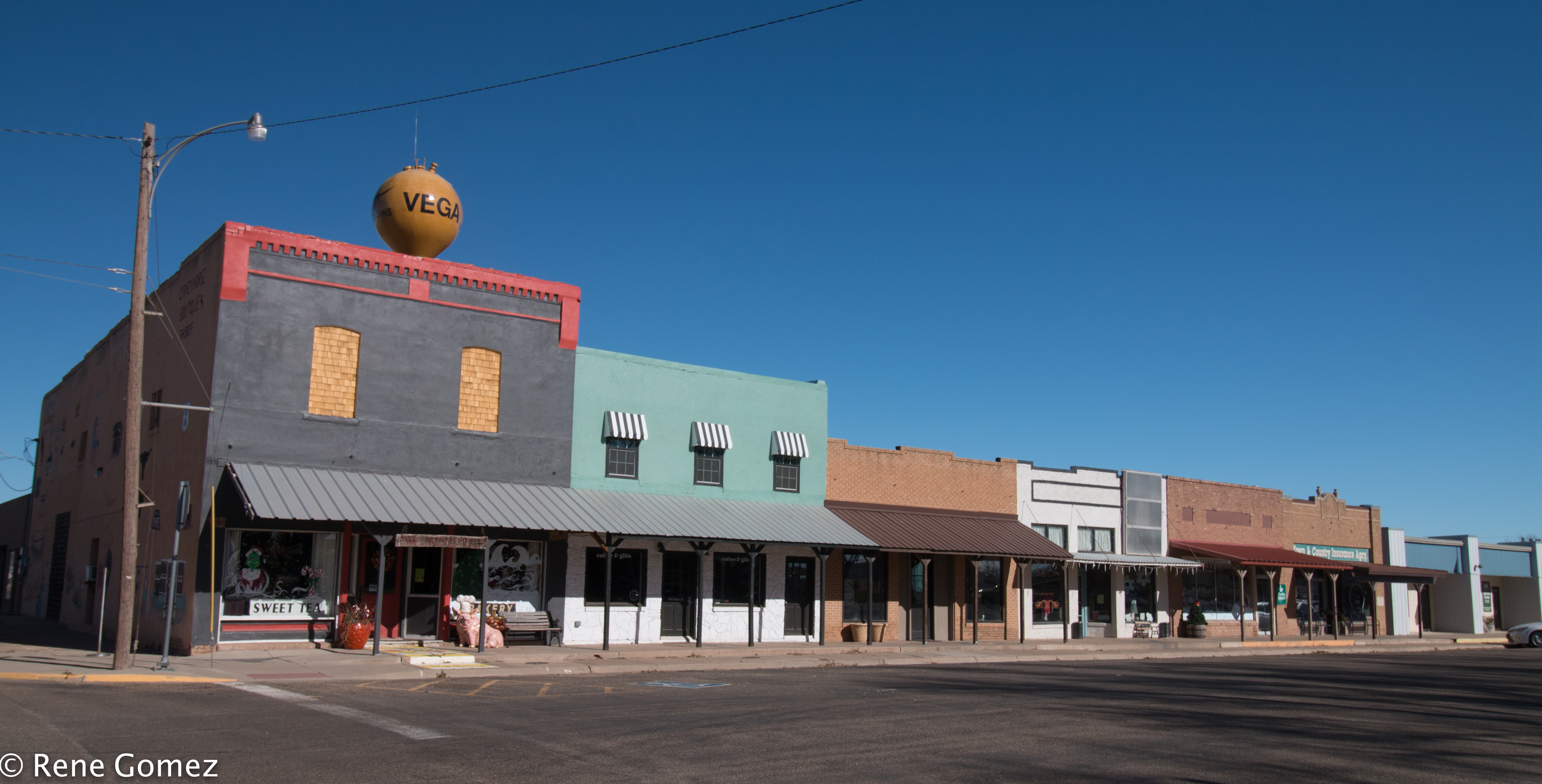
- Downtown Vega

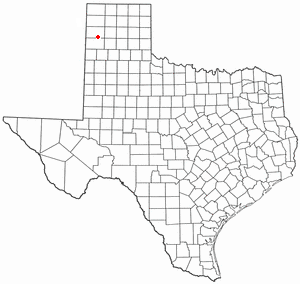
- Location of Vega, Texas

- Coordinates: 35°14′44″N 102°25′30″W
- Country: United States
- State: Texas
- County: Oldham

Area
  - Total: 1.34 sq mi (3.47 km^{2})
  - Land: 1.34 sq mi (3.47 km^{2})
  - Water: 0 sq mi (0.00 km^{2})
- Elevation: 4,029 ft (1,228 m)

Population (2020)
  - Total: 879
  - Density: 656/sq mi (253/km^{2})
- Time zone: UTC-6 (Central (CST))
  - Summer (DST): UTC-5 (CDT)
- ZIP code: 79092
- Area code: 806
- FIPS code: 48-75188
- GNIS feature ID: 2412147
- Website: www.vegatx.org

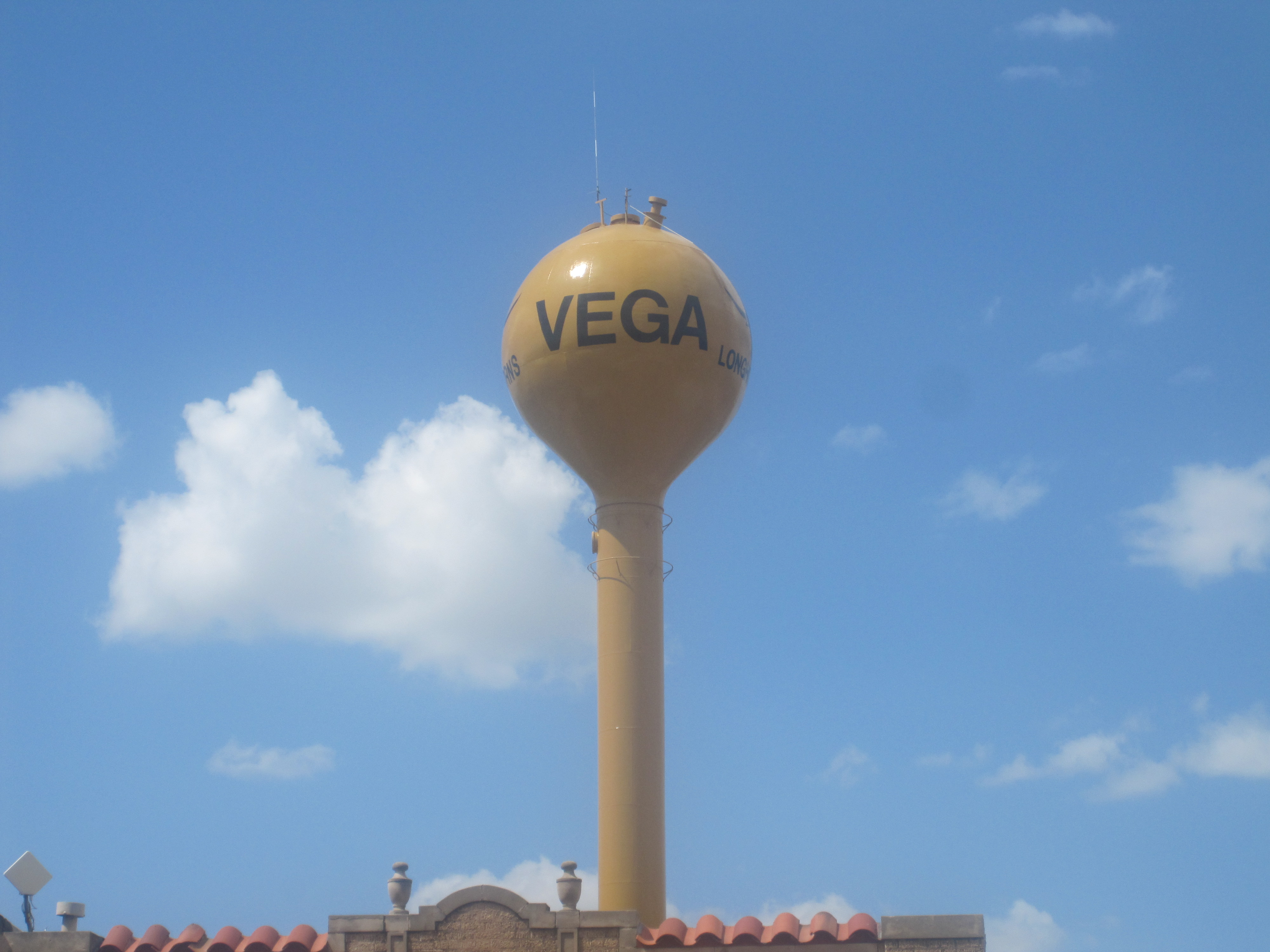
Water tower

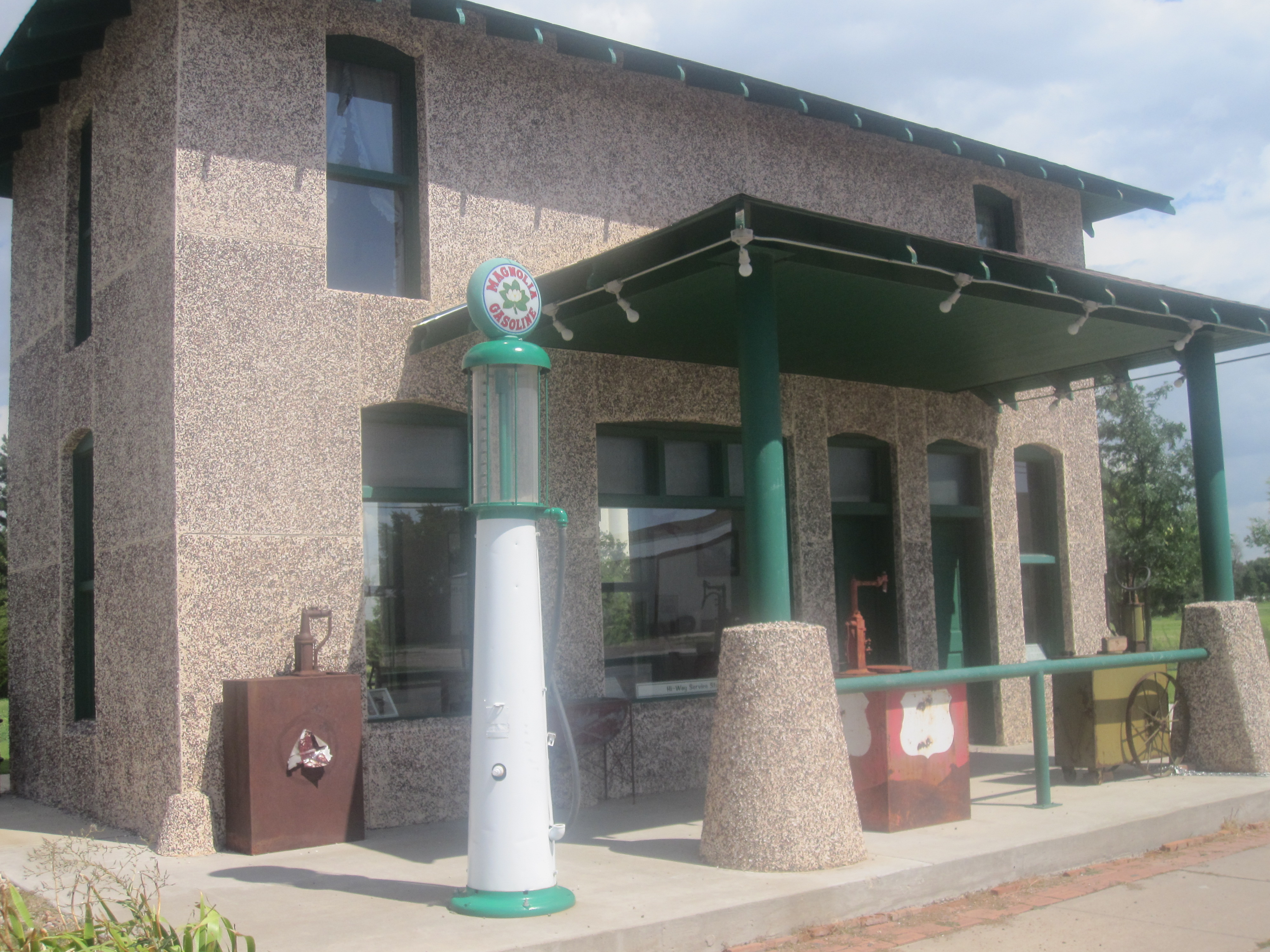
Restored Magnolia gasoline station on U.S. Route 66.

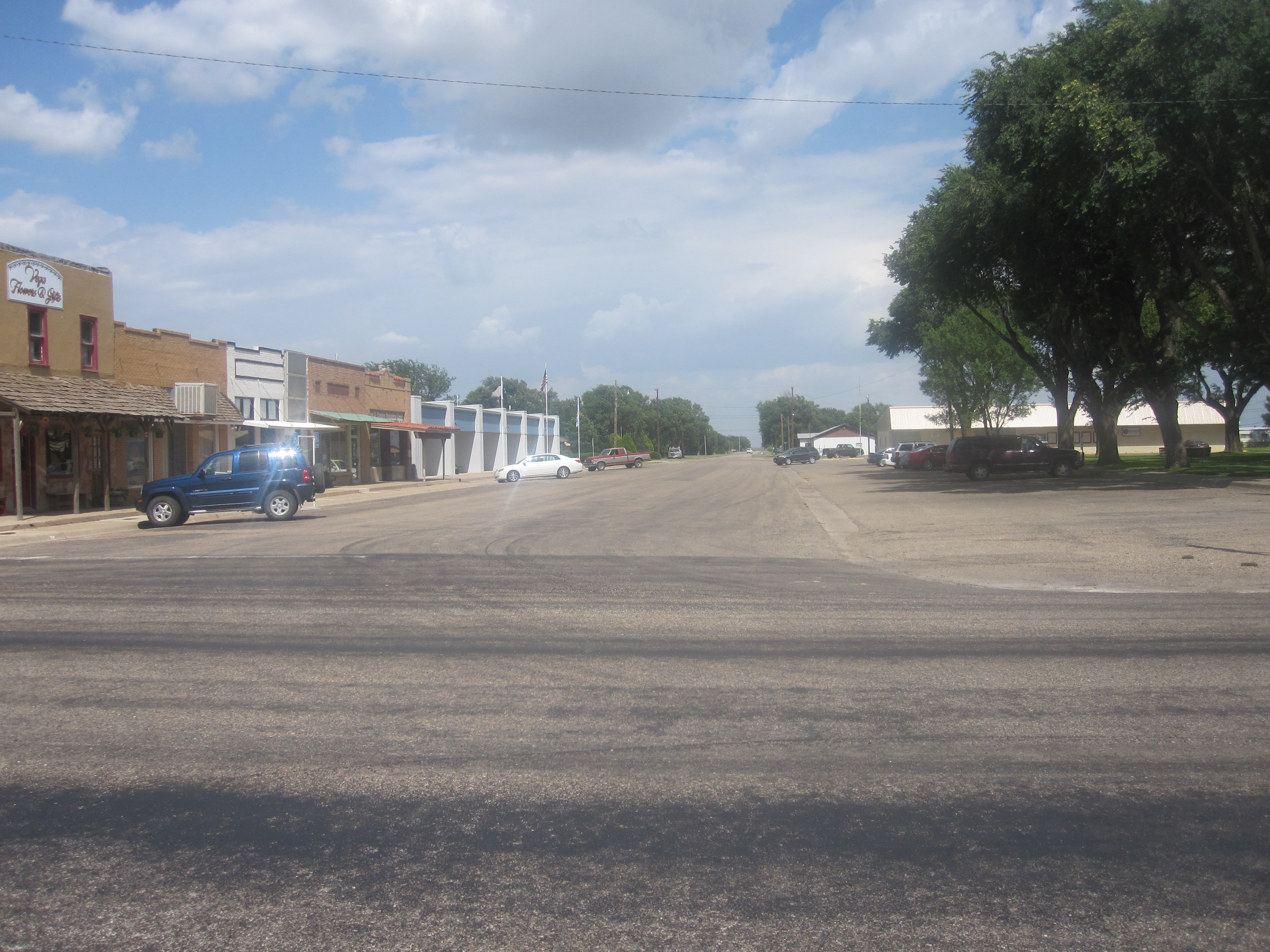
Downtown Vega, with courthouse to the right and City Hall to the left

Vega is a city in and the county seat of Oldham County, Texas, United States. The population was 879 at the 2020 census, down from 884 at the 2010 census.

== History ==
In 1879, the area was opened by the state for homesteading. The first settler, N.J. Whitfield, arrived in 1899. On October 17, 1899, he purchased part of Oldham County known as Section 90 at a per-acre rate of US$1 (equivalent to $38.7 in 2025). In 1903, Whitfield sold a 100-foot (30 m) strip of land that extended across the southern part of Oldham County to the Choctaw, Oklahoma, and Texas (later Rock Island) Railroad as a right-of-way. He then sold portions of land on the south side of the right-of-way to other settlers. A. M. Miller and Howard Trigg surveyed the town site that eventually became Vega in May 1903. The name Vega, which is Spanish for "meadow", was chosen because it reflected the vast prairie and surrounding countryside of the area. Soon after, Miller opened a store, and a post office, saloon, and a school that doubled as a Masonic Lodge were built in the community. In 1907, ranchers Patrick and John Landergin purchased a part of the LS Ranch from Swift & Company. Working in association with the Amarillo, Texas-based Pool Land Company, the Landergin brothers brought more prospective settlers to the community.

The nearby town of Tascosa, which was designated Oldham County seat in 1880, declined in both importance and population as Vega grew. A five-year battle over which community should serve as Oldham County's seat of government was put to a vote in 1915. In the special election, citizens chose to move the county seat from Tascosa to Vega. Until a permanent courthouse was built, county business was conducted in Vega's Oldham Hotel.

Modern amenities, such as telephone service, were introduced during the 1920s. In 1926, Route 66 (superseded by Interstate 40) was commissioned as a link from Chicago to Los Angeles and ran through Vega along the Old Ozark Trail.

Vega was officially incorporated in 1927, and the population was 519 in the 1930 census. On May 3, 1931, a fire destroyed six buildings west of the courthouse square. Two months later, a second fire burned two buildings on the north side of the square. These fires prompted the town to establish a municipal water system.

== Geography ==
Vega is located at 35°14′44″N 102°25′30″W (35.245547, –102.425112). It is situated at the junction of Interstate 40 (Old Route 66) and U.S. Highway 385 in southern Oldham County, approximately 30 miles west of Amarillo.

According to the United States Census Bureau, the city has a total area of 1.1 square miles (2.8 km^{2}), all land.

=== Climate ===
According to the Köppen Climate Classification system, Vega has a semi-arid climate, abbreviated "BSk" on climate maps.

== Demographics ==
Historical population
Census	Pop.	Note	%±
1930	519		—
1940	515		−0.8%
1950	620		20.4%
1960	658		6.1%
1970	839		27.5%
1980	900		7.3%
1990	840		−6.7%
2000	936		11.4%
2010	884		−5.6%
2020	879		−0.6%
U.S. Decennial Census

=== 2020 census ===
As of the 2020 census, Vega had a population of 879, 360 households, and 267 families residing in the city; the median age was 41.7 years. 22.8% of residents were under the age of 18 and 20.1% of residents were 65 years of age or older. For every 100 females there were 98.0 males, and for every 100 females age 18 and over there were 98.0 males age 18 and over.

0.0% of residents lived in urban areas, while 100.0% lived in rural areas.

There were 360 households in Vega, of which 32.5% had children under the age of 18 living in them. Of all households, 55.6% were married-couple households, 16.7% were households with a male householder and no spouse or partner present, and 24.4% were households with a female householder and no spouse or partner present. About 27.5% of all households were made up of individuals and 11.9% had someone living alone who was 65 years of age or older.

There were 426 housing units, of which 15.5% were vacant. The homeowner vacancy rate was 1.6% and the rental vacancy rate was 17.3%.

Racial composition as of the 2020 census
Race	Number	Percent
White	690	78.5%
Black or African American	1	0.1%
American Indian and Alaska Native	6	0.7%
Asian	8	0.9%
Native Hawaiian and Other Pacific Islander	0	0.0%
Some other race	82	9.3%
Two or more races	92	10.5%
Hispanic or Latino (of any race)	197	22.4%

=== 2000 census ===
As of the census of 2000, there were 936 people, 378 households, and 275 families residing in the city. The population density was 866.7 inhabitants per square mile (334.6/km^{2}). There were 407 housing units at an average density of 376.9 per square mile (145.5/km^{2}). The racial makeup of the city was 94.76% White, 0.96% African American, 0.75% Native American, 0.21% Asian, 2.88% from other races, and 0.43% from two or more races. Hispanic or Latino of any race were 9.40% of the population.

There were 378 households, out of which 31.2% had children under the age of 18 living with them, 58.7% were married couples living together, 12.7% had a female householder with no husband present, and 27.0% were non-families. 24.6% of all households were made up of individuals, and 13.5% had someone living alone who was 65 years of age or older. The average household size was 2.46 and the average family size was 2.93.

In the city, the population was spread out, with 26.9% under the age of 18, 7.6% from 18 to 24, 24.6% from 25 to 44, 24.1% from 45 to 64, and 16.8% who were 65 years of age or older. The median age was 39 years. For every 100 females, there were 87.6 males. For every 100 females age 18 and over, there were 83.9 males.

The median income for a household in the city was $30,481, and the median income for a family was $35,227. Males had a median income of $27,120 versus $22,500 for females. The per capita income for the city was $17,315. About 12.3% of families and 14.8% of the population were below the poverty line, including 20.0% of those under age 18 and 9.1% of those age 65 or over.

== Education ==
Public education in the city of Vega is provided by the Vega Independent School District. In recent years, the district has had a total enrollment of between 250 and 300 students.

All Vega ISD students are housed on a single campus located at 200 Longhorn Drive. The campus is split into two schools – Vega Elementary School (grades K–6) and Vega High School (grades 7–12). In addition, students in grades 7–12 from the neighboring Wildorado Independent School District in Wildorado attend Vega High School unless their parents choose another of Wildorado's neighboring districts.

=== Public library ===
The library was originally built in 1911 and housed a silent movie theater; today, it touts 11,000 volumes.
