= Tascosa, Texas =

- Ghost town
- Nickname: Old Tascosa
- Motto: Cowboy Capital of the Plains
- Location within Texas
- Coordinates: 35°31′52″N 102°15′20″W
- Country: United States
- State: Texas
- County: Oldham
- Plaza Atascosa: 1876
- Elevation: 3,192 ft (973 m)
- Time zone: UTC-6 (Central (CST))
  - Summer (DST): UTC-5 (MDT)
- GNIS feature ID: 2646624

Tascosa, sometimes called Old Tascosa, is the former capital of 10 counties in the Texas Panhandle. The town emerged briefly in the 1880s as an economic rival of Dodge City, Kansas. Located in Oldham County, northwest of Amarillo, Tascosa is now a ghost town.

In 1893, the bridge was washed out and the flood damaged homes and businesses, so people began to move away. Two of the last residents were ex-gambler Mickey McCormick and a former dance hall girl and card dealer Frenchy McCormick. Mickey died in 1912, and Frenchy in 1941. They are buried next to each other outside town.

In 1939, Cal Farley's Boys Ranch opened after Julian Bivins, son of Lee Bivins, donated the town site, the renovated old courthouse, and the surrounding 120 acres. The courthouse, now a museum, and the 1889 schoolhouse are the only buildings from the old town to survive into the 21st century.

Tascosa was the setting for the showdown between Lin McAdams (Jimmy Stewart) and Dutch Henry Brown (Stephen McNally) in the 1950 American Western film, Winchester 73. Stewart also played the sheriff of Tascosa, Guthrie McCabe, in the 1961 production Two Rode Together.

== Climate ==
According to the Köppen climate classification, Tascosa has a semiarid climate, BSk on climate maps.

== See also ==
- LIT Ranch
