= Vega Independent School District =

School district in Texas

Location
- Vega, TX ESC Region 16 USA

District information
- Type: Public
- Motto: Every day is a great day to be a Vega Longhorn
- Grades: K through 12
- Superintendent: Jody Johnson

Students and staff
- Athletic conference: UIL Class AA
- Colors: black and gold

Other information
- Mascot: Longhorns and Ladyhorns
- Website: Vega ISD

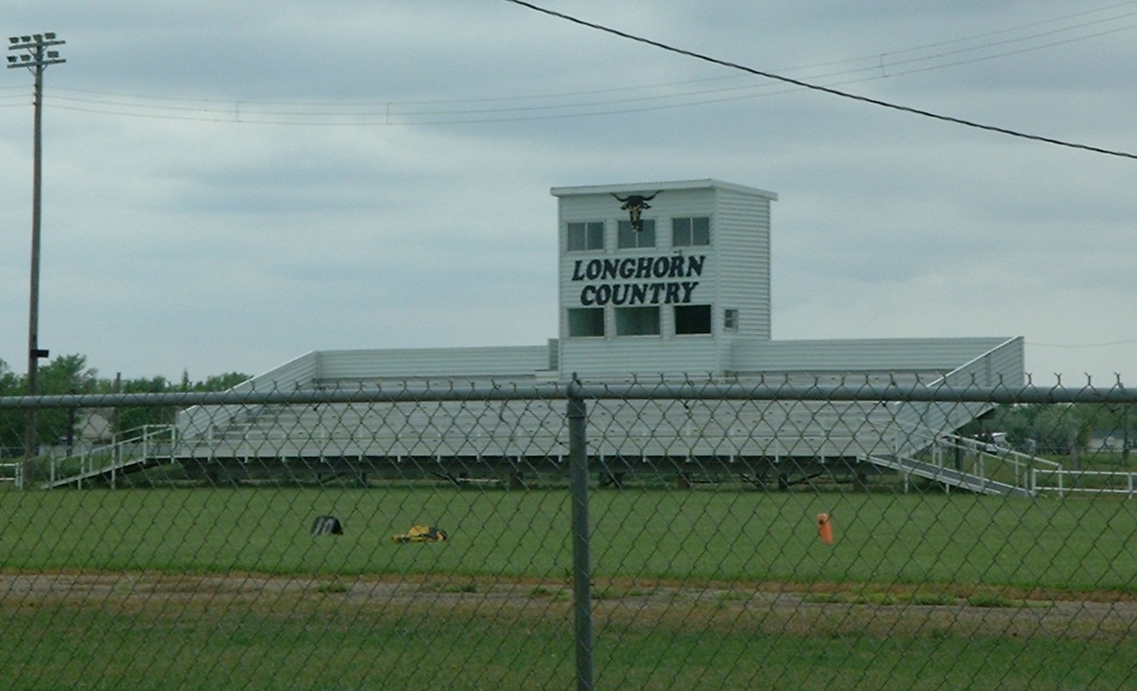
Football stadium in Vega in 2005

Vega Independent School District is a public school district based in Vega, Texas (USA).

Located in Oldham County, the district extends into a small portion of Deaf Smith County.

The district operates three schools on one campus.

- Vega High School (Grades 9–12)
- Vega Junior High School (Grades 6–8)
- Vega Elementary School] (Grades K–4)
  - 2006 National Blue Ribbon School

In 2009, the school district was rated "recognized" by the Texas Education Agency.
