= Landergin, Texas =

Ghost town in Texas, US

Coordinates: 35°16′10″N 102°33′29″W

Landergin is a ghost town in Oldham County, Texas, US. It was founded in 1908 as a stop on the Chicago, Rock Island and Gulf Railway. It was on a ranch which belonged to Patrick H. Landergin and his brother John. According to the Handbook of Texas Online, "In 1936 Landergin reported one store and a population of fifteen."
