= Oldham County, Texas =

County in Texas, United States

- County
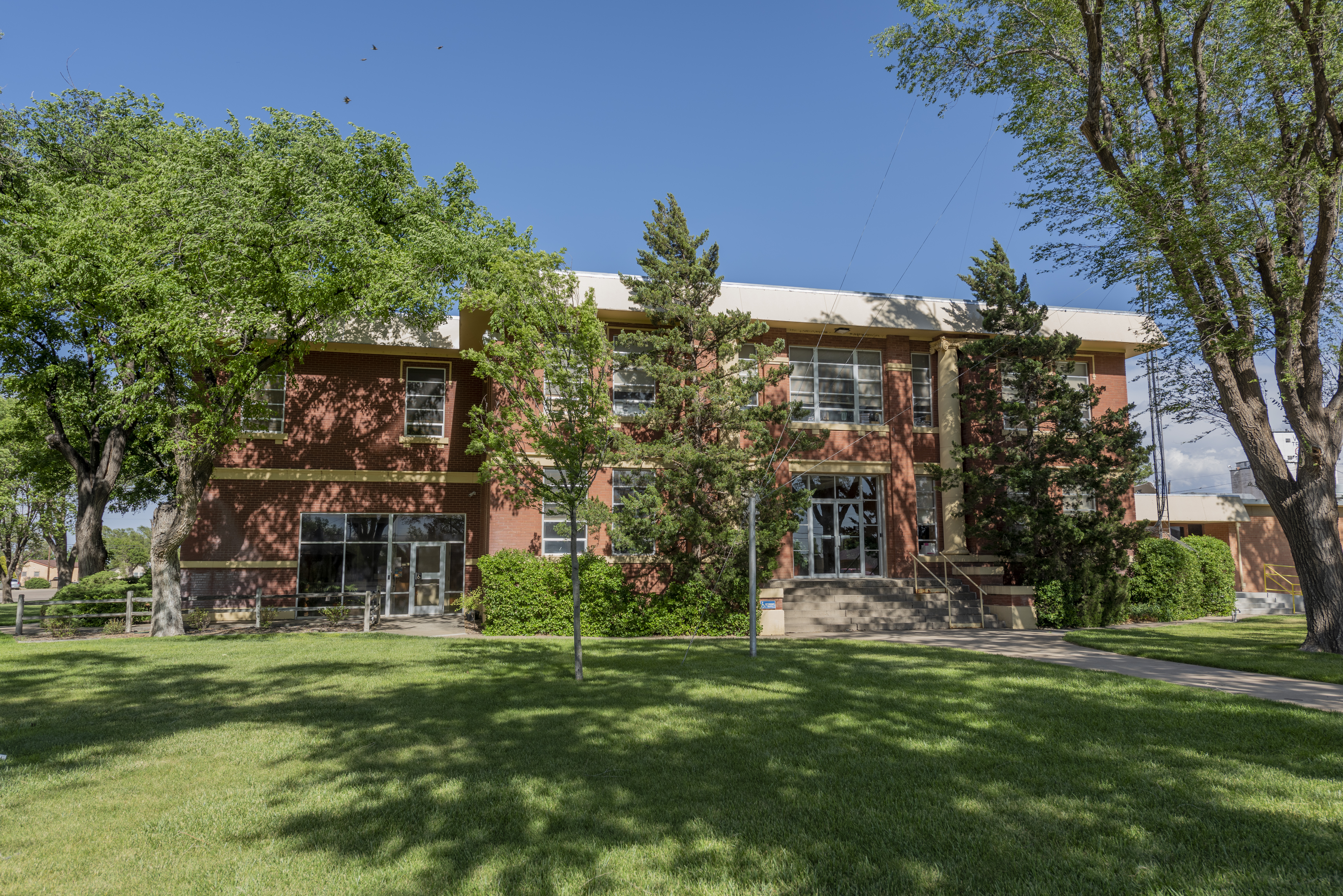
- Oldham County Courthouse in Vega

- Location within the U.S. state of Texas
- Coordinates: 35°24′N 102°36′W
- Country: United States
- State: Texas
- Founded: 1881
- Seat: Vega
- Largest city: Vega

Area
  - Total: 1,501 sq mi (3,890 km^{2})
  - Land: 1,501 sq mi (3,890 km^{2})
  - Water: 0.9 sq mi (2.3 km^{2}) 0.06%

Population (2020)
  - Total: 1,758
  - Estimate (2025): 1,783 ▲
  - Density: 1.2/sq mi (0.46/km^{2})
- Time zone: UTC−6 (Central)
  - Summer (DST): UTC−5 (CDT)
- Congressional district: 13th
- Website: www.co.oldham.tx.us

Oldham County is a county located in the U.S. state of Texas. As of the 2020 census, its population was 1,758. Its county seat is Vega. The county was created in 1876 and organized in 1881. Oldham County is included in the Amarillo, TX Metropolitan Statistical Area.

== History ==
Oldham County was formed in 1876 and organized in 1881, and named for Williamson Simpson Oldham, Sr., a Texas pioneer and Confederate Senator. At the time of its organization, about half of the county was a part of the XIT Ranch. The county seat was originally at the town of Tascosa, Texas, which in the 1880s was one of the largest towns in the Panhandle. As the railroads came through the county, however, they bypassed Tascosa; several new towns and farms sprang up along the rail lines, and by 1915 Tascosa had a courthouse and almost no residents; the county seat was moved to Vega that year. Oldham County is primarily ranch and farm land, with many thousands of acres planted in wheat, the major crop. The county also has some petroleum production and large wind farms.

== Geography ==
According to the U.S. Census Bureau, the county has a total area of 1,501 square miles (3,890 km^{2}), of which 1,501 square miles (3,890 km^{2}) is land and 0.9 square miles (2.3 km^{2}) (0.06%) is water. A southern strip of the county, including the county seat, Vega, is located on top of the Llano Estacado (Staked Plains). The next stretch, comprising approximately 12 miles, slopes down to the Canadian River. The former county seat of Tascosa is located at a crossing of the Canadian River, north of Vega. The terrain then slopes up from the Canadian River, passing the county line at approximately six miles and reaching the top of the High Plains a further four miles north.

=== Border dispute with New Mexico ===
For years, there has been a simmering dispute over a strip of land running north and south, including an abandoned part of Glenrio at the western end of Oldham County, as to which state it is lawfully a part of. The border between the two states was originally defined as the 103rd meridian, but the 1859 survey that was supposed to mark that boundary mistakenly set the border between 2.29 and 3.77 miles too far west of that line, making the current towns of Farwell, Texline and the eastern part of Glenrio appear to be within the State of Texas. New Mexico's short border with Oklahoma, in contrast, was surveyed on the correct meridian. New Mexico's draft constitution in 1910 stated that the border is on the 103rd meridian as intended. The disputed strip, hundreds of miles long, includes parts of valuable oilfields of the Permian Basin. A bill was passed in the New Mexico Senate to fund and file a lawsuit in the U.S. Supreme Court to recover the strip from Texas, but the bill did not become law.

The question was once settled in favor of Texas by the intervention of President William Howard Taft, at the request of Senator John Villiers Farwell, whose three-million-acre XIT Ranch would have been diminished by New Mexico's claim. With Taft's support, on February 16, 1911, the Joint Resolution of Congress on admitting New Mexico as a state declared that any provision of New Mexico's constitution that "...in any way tends to annul or change the boundary lines between the State of Texas and Territory of New Mexico shall be of no force and effect."

Today, land in the strip is included in Texas land surveys, and the land and towns (the east part of Glenrio in Deaf Smith and Oldham Counties) for all purposes are taxed and governed by the State of Texas.

=== Major highways ===
- I-40
  - I-40 BL (Adrian)
  - I-40 BL (Vega)
- US 385
- SH 214
- Spur 233

=== Adjacent counties ===
- Hartley County (north)
- Moore County (northeast)
- Potter County (east)
- Deaf Smith County (south)
- Quay County, New Mexico (west)
- Randall County (southeast)

== Demographics ==
Historical population
Census	Pop.	Note	%±
1880	387		—
1890	270		−30.2%
1900	349		29.3%
1910	812		132.7%
1920	709		−12.7%
1930	1,404		98.0%
1940	1,385		−1.4%
1950	1,672		20.7%
1960	1,928		15.3%
1970	2,258		17.1%
1980	2,283		1.1%
1990	2,278		−0.2%
2000	2,185		−4.1%
2010	2,052		−6.1%
2020	1,758		−14.3%
2025 (est.)	1,783	▲	1.4%
U.S. Decennial Census; 1850–1900 1910; 1920 1930 1940; 1950 1960 1970; 1980 1990 2000; 2010 2020

=== Racial and ethnic composition ===
Oldham County, Texas – Racial and ethnic composition Note: the US Census treats Hispanic/Latino as an ethnic category. This table excludes Latinos from the racial categories and assigns them to a separate category. Hispanics/Latinos may be of any race.
Race / Ethnicity (NH = Non-Hispanic)	Pop 2000	Pop 2010	Pop 2020	% 2000	% 2010	% 2020
White alone (NH)	1,852	1,699	1,325	84.76%	82.80%	75.37%
Black or African American alone (NH)	41	60	33	1.88%	2.92%	1.88%
Native American or Alaska Native alone (NH)	26	11	6	1.19%	0.54%	0.34%
Asian alone (NH)	8	17	10	0.37%	0.83%	0.57%
Pacific Islander alone (NH)	0	0	0	0.00%	0.00%	0.00%
Other race alone (NH)	0	0	0	0.00%	0.00%	0.00%
Mixed race or Multiracial (NH)	17	22	71	0.78%	1.07%	4.04%
Hispanic or Latino (any race)	241	243	313	11.03%	11.84%	17.80%
Total	2,185	2,052	1,758	100.00%	100.00%	100.00%

=== 2020 census ===
As of the 2020 census, the county had a population of 1,758. The median age was 38.4 years. 30.1% of residents were under the age of 18 and 17.6% of residents were 65 years of age or older. For every 100 females there were 103.7 males, and for every 100 females age 18 and over there were 93.8 males age 18 and over.

The racial makeup of the county was 81.0% White, 2.0% Black or African American, 0.6% American Indian and Alaska Native, 0.6% Asian, <0.1% Native Hawaiian and Pacific Islander, 6.7% from some other race, and 9.1% from two or more races. Hispanic or Latino residents of any race comprised 17.8% of the population.

<0.1% of residents lived in urban areas, while 100.0% lived in rural areas.

There were 601 households in the county, of which 34.4% had children under the age of 18 living in them. Of all households, 58.4% were married-couple households, 17.0% were households with a male householder and no spouse or partner present, and 20.6% were households with a female householder and no spouse or partner present. About 24.1% of all households were made up of individuals and 10.3% had someone living alone who was 65 years of age or older.

There were 732 housing units, of which 17.9% were vacant. Among occupied housing units, 80.0% were owner-occupied and 20.0% were renter-occupied. The homeowner vacancy rate was 2.4% and the rental vacancy rate was 15.6%.

=== 2000 census ===
As of the 2000 census, there were 2,185 people, 735 households, and 565 families residing in the county. The population density was 2 people per square mile (0.77 people/km^{2}). There were 815 housing units at an average density of 0 units per square mile (0/km^{2}). The racial makeup of the county was 90.66% White, 1.88% Black or African American, 1.28% Native American, 0.37% Asian, 4.62% from other races, and 1.19% from two or more races. 11.03% of the population were Hispanic or Latino of any race. In terms of ancestry, 25.2% were of German, 14.1% were of Irish, 10.4% were of English, 4.7% were of American, 3.3% were of French, 2.9% were of Dutch.

There were 735 households, out of which 35.10% had children under the age of 18 living with them, 66.70% were married couples living together, 8.80% had a female householder with no husband present, and 23.00% were non-families. 21.00% of all households were made up of individuals, and 10.10% had someone living alone who was 65 years of age or older. The average household size was 2.61 and the average family size was 3.02.

In the county, the population was spread out, with 35.00% under the age of 18, 7.20% from 18 to 24, 23.30% from 25 to 44, 23.20% from 45 to 64, and 11.30% who were 65 years of age or older. The median age was 33 years. For every 100 females there were 108.10 males. For every 100 females age 18 and over, there were 90.60 males.

The median income for a household in the county was $33,713, and the median income for a family was $39,091. Males had a median income of $26,845 versus $20,185 for females. The per capita income for the county was $14,806. About 10.50% of families and 19.80% of the population were below the poverty line, including 20.00% of those under age 18 and 7.90% of those age 65 or over.

== Communities ==
=== Cities ===
- Adrian
- Vega (county seat)

=== Census-designated place ===
- Boys Ranch
- Wildorado

=== Ghost towns ===
- Boise
- Landergin
- Tascosa

== Education ==
School districts:

- Adrian Independent School District
- Boys Ranch Independent School District
- Channing Independent School District
- Vega Independent School District
- Wildorado Independent School District

All of the county is in the service area of Amarillo College.

== Gallery ==
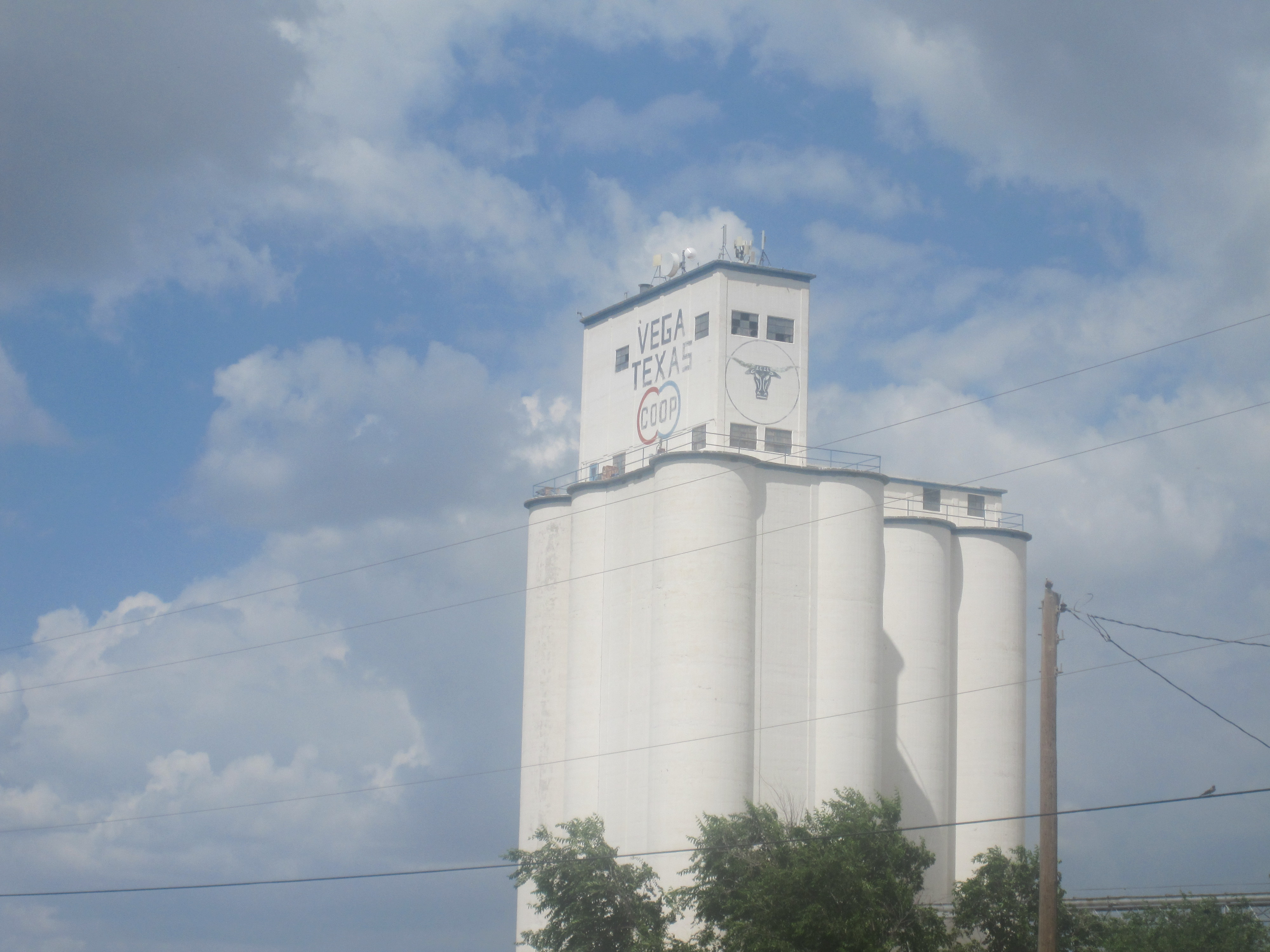
Vega CO OP grain elevator serves Oldham County.

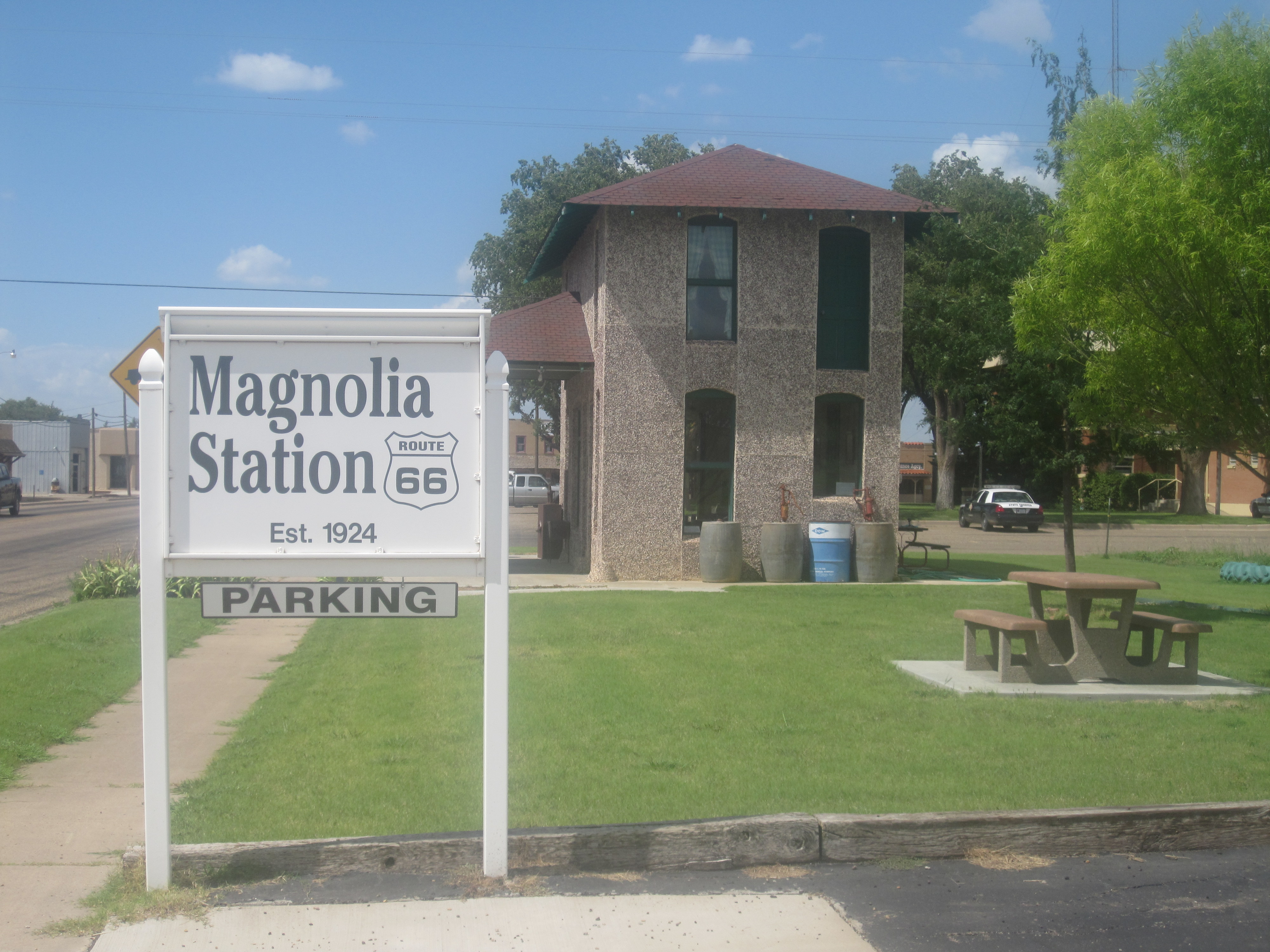
Magnolia Station, a U.S. Route 66 roadside attraction near the Oldham County Courthouse in Vega

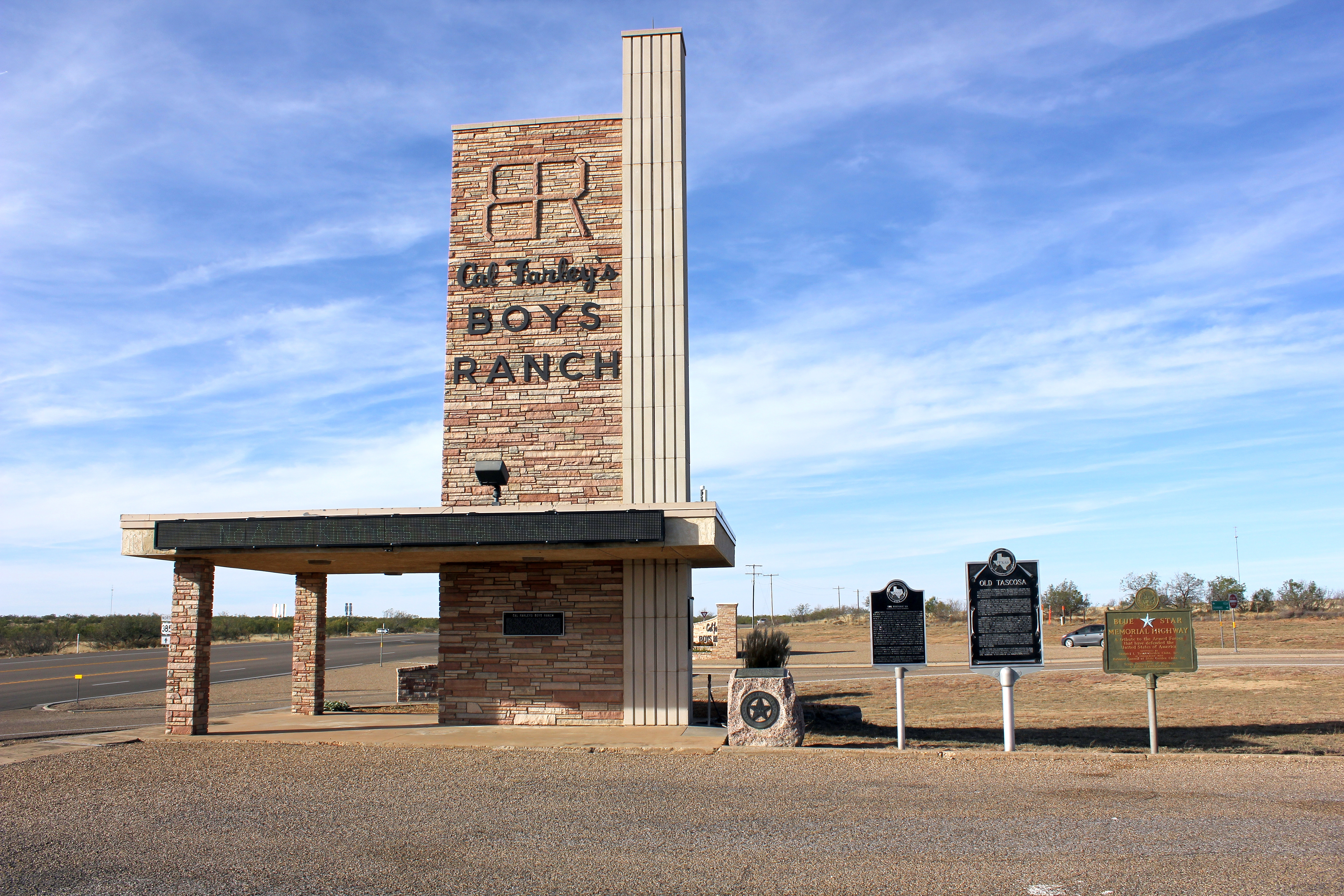
Sign off U.S. Route 385 to Cal Farley's Boys Ranch in Oldham County

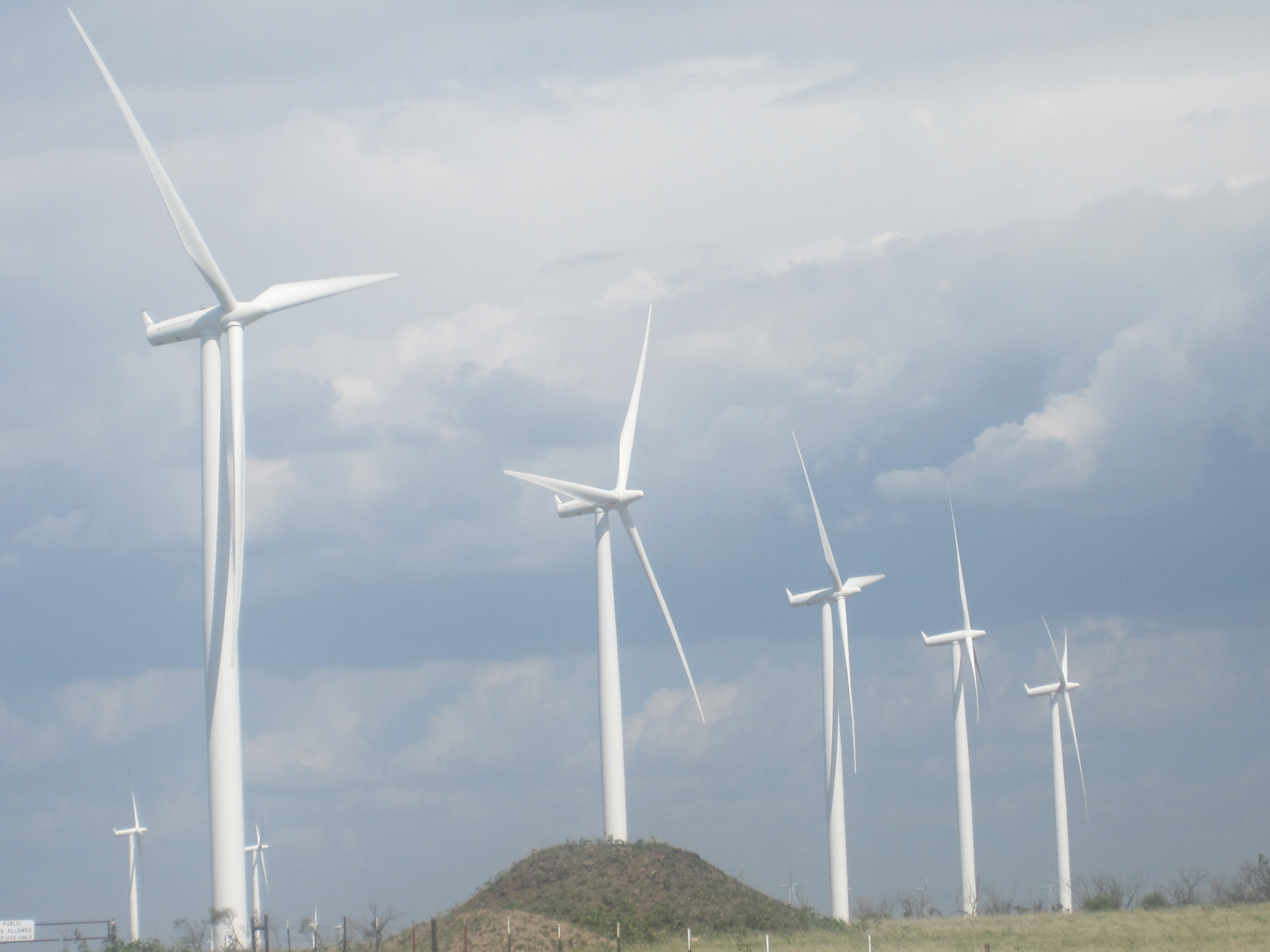
Wildorado Wind Ranch in Oldham County as photographed from Route 385

== Politics ==
In presidential elections, Oldham County is solidly Republican. Oldham County is located within District 86 of the Texas House of Representatives. Oldham County is located within District 31 of the Texas Senate.

United States presidential election results for Oldham County, Texas
Year	Republican		Democratic		Third party(ies)	
Year	No.	%	No.	%	No.	%
1912	22	15.49%	92	64.79%	28	19.72%
1916	42	22.83%	138	75.00%	4	2.17%
1920	52	27.08%	139	72.40%	1	0.52%
1924	71	26.10%	187	68.75%	14	5.15%
1928	172	52.28%	157	47.72%	0	0.00%
1932	61	12.37%	432	87.63%	0	0.00%
1936	20	4.33%	437	94.59%	5	1.08%
1940	82	16.43%	416	83.37%	1	0.20%
1944	93	22.74%	277	67.73%	39	9.54%
1948	100	21.83%	339	74.02%	19	4.15%
1952	341	54.65%	280	44.87%	3	0.48%
1956	284	49.13%	294	50.87%	0	0.00%
1960	313	48.68%	326	50.70%	4	0.62%
1964	269	40.15%	397	59.25%	4	0.60%
1968	320	40.61%	237	30.08%	231	29.31%
1972	666	77.17%	173	20.05%	24	2.78%
1976	354	38.86%	554	60.81%	3	0.33%
1980	557	63.73%	290	33.18%	27	3.09%
1984	762	76.97%	226	22.83%	2	0.20%
1988	691	68.82%	303	30.18%	10	1.00%
1992	583	59.07%	225	22.80%	179	18.14%
1996	583	66.17%	213	24.18%	85	9.65%
2000	659	85.14%	108	13.95%	7	0.90%
2004	733	86.95%	108	12.81%	2	0.24%
2008	813	88.37%	102	11.09%	5	0.54%
2012	790	90.91%	71	8.17%	8	0.92%
2016	850	89.19%	78	8.18%	25	2.62%
2020	917	90.88%	81	8.03%	11	1.09%
2024	895	91.89%	74	7.60%	5	0.51%

United States Senate election results for Oldham County, Texas1
Year	Republican		Democratic		Third party(ies)	
Year	No.	%	No.	%	No.	%
2024	862	89.70%	91	9.47%	8	0.83%

United States Senate election results for Oldham County, Texas2
Year	Republican		Democratic		Third party(ies)	
Year	No.	%	No.	%	No.	%
2020	908	91.16%	74	7.43%	14	1.41%

Texas Gubernatorial election results for Oldham County
Year	Republican		Democratic		Third party(ies)	
Year	No.	%	No.	%	No.	%
2022	710	92.21%	50	6.49%	10	1.30%

== See also ==
- List of museums in the Texas Panhandle
- National Register of Historic Places listings in Oldham County, Texas
- Recorded Texas Historic Landmarks in Oldham County
