= Milo Center, Texas =

- Unincorporated community
- Location within Texas Location within the United States
- Coordinates: 34°58′59″N 102°24′08″W
- Country: United States
- State: Texas
- County: Deaf Smith
- Elevation: 3,914 ft (1,193 m)
- Time zone: UTC-6 (Central (CST))
  - Summer (DST): UTC-5 (CDT)
- Area code: 806
- GNIS feature ID: 1380199

Milo Center is an unincorporated community in Deaf Smith County, in the U.S. state of Texas. According to the Handbook of Texas, the community had a population of 5 in 2000.

== Geography ==
Milo Center is located on U.S. Route 385, north of Hereford in east-central Deaf Smith County.

== Education ==
Milo Center joined the Hereford Independent School District in 1939. Today, the community is zoned for Bluebonnet Elementary School.
