= Dawn, Texas =

- Unincorporated community
- Location within the state of Texas Dawn (the United States)
- Coordinates: 34°54′37″N 102°12′00″W
- Country: United States
- State: Texas
- County: Deaf Smith
- Elevation: 3,803 ft (1,159 m)
- Time zone: UTC-6 (Central (CST))
  - Summer (DST): UTC-5 (CDT)
- ZIP codes: 79025
- GNIS feature ID: 1355724

Dawn is an unincorporated community in eastern Deaf Smith County, Texas, United States. According to the Handbook of Texas, the community had a population of 52 in 2000.

== History ==
Jim Moore, the T Anchor Ranch's boss, built a dugout approximately six miles southwest of the present-day townsite in 1887, giving rise to Dawn. After buying the dugout and the filing rights for the nearby areas two years later, J. H. Parrish eventually constructed a general store for the ranchers in the region. According to legend, he named it "Dawn of a New Country," or "Dawn of Civilization," and the first word of the sentence was picked as the name when he filed for a post office. According to another story, Parrish declared, "This is the dawn of a new day," when he first saw the land. In a barn near Dawn, James N. Askren operated a broom manufacturing plant. Dawn was a thriving hamlet by the time Parrish sold his land holdings and relocated to Oklahoma in 1893. When the Pecos Valley and Northeastern Railway arrived and built a depot there in 1898, it was guaranteed to survive. Over the following few years, Dawn flourished as a rancher's shipping hub, drawing in several immigrant farmers. The town had a hotel with a small band playing in it, a community church (later a Baptist church), and a lumber mill by 1917. Wheat became the town's principal source of income by installing irrigation wells. In the 1940s, David Rodgers started selling his Deaf Smith corn meal, wheat berries, and stone-ground whole-wheat flour from his elevator at Dawn. Henry Turner had founded a stone-ground grain company. At the time, the town had 100 residents and four establishments. Later, Dawn lost several of its older enterprises, including its hotel, bank, railroad depot, lumberyard, and flour mill, to paved roads and improved transportation. Nevertheless, in 1973, some clubs constructed a new community center there. In 1984, Dawn reported 94 residents, a store, a post office, and three elevators. Although there were still 94 people living there in 1990, by 2000 the number had decreased to 52.

Although Dawn is unincorporated, it has a post office, with the ZIP code of 79025.

== Geography ==
Dawn is located at the intersection of U.S. Route 60 and Farm to Market Road 809, 14 mi (23 km) northeast of Hereford, 18 mi (29 km) southwest of Canyon, and 34 mi (55 km) southwest of Amarillo in eastern Deaf Smith County.

== Education ==
In 1891, James N. Askren opened the first school in Dawn. Another school campus was built in the community in the 1920s, including the county's first school cafeteria. It joined the Hereford Independent School District in 1963. The community is zoned for Aikman Elementary School in the district.

== Notable person ==
Thomas Edd Mayfield, Bluegrass musician, was born in Dawn.
