= The Best of Bill Monroe =

Compilation album by Bill Monroe and his Blue Grass Boys
- Released: June 9, 1975
- Recorded: 1950–1967
- Genre: Bluegrass; gospel
- Length: 54:46
- Label: MCA
- Producer: Paul Cohen; Owen Bradley; Harry Silverstein

Bill Monroe chronology
Best of Bill Monroe and his Blue Grass Boys (1975)	The Best of Bill Monroe (1975)	Bill Monroe and his Blue Grass Boys Vol. II (1950–1972) (1975)

The Best of Bill Monroe is a compilation album by American bluegrass musician Bill Monroe and his band, the Blue Grass Boys. Released by MCA Records on June 9, 1975, it contains 20 songs recorded between 1950 and 1967, all of which were previously released as singles, B-sides, or on other albums.

== Background ==
After issuing Best of Bill Monroe and his Blue Grass Boys in Europe a couple of months earlier, MCA Records released The Best of Bill Monroe as its first 20-track Bill Monroe album in the United States on June 9, 1975.

== Track listing ==
The Best of Bill Monroe track listing
No.	Title	Writer(s)	Original release	Length
1.	"Uncle Pen" (recorded October 15, 1950)	Bill Monroe	"When the Golden Leaves Begin to Fall" B-side (1950)	2:44
2.	"Let Me Rest at the End of My Journey" (recorded December 10, 1962)	Traditional	I'll Meet You in Church Sunday Morning (1964)	2:35
3.	"Blue Grass Twist (Blue Grass Part One)" (recorded December 3, 1960)	Monroe	Mr. Blue Grass (1961)	2:46
4.	"It's Mighty Dark to Travel" (recorded December 3, 1960)	Monroe	Mr. Blue Grass (1961)	2:03
5.	"Pretty Fair Maiden in the Garden" (recorded November 3, 1966)	Monroe	Blue Grass Time (1967)	2:45
6.	"Roane County Prison" (recorded May 15, 1957)	Joe Ahr	Knee Deep in Blue Grass (1958)	3:11
7.	"I Live in the Past" (recorded March 16, 1965)	Virginia Stauffer	Kentucky Blue Grass (1970)	2:55
8.	"The First Whippoorwill" (recorded October 28, 1951)	Monroe	"Christmas Time's A-Comin'" B-side (1951)	2:50
9.	"Come Back to Me in My Dreams" (recorded May 15, 1957)	Monroe	Knee Deep in Blue Grass (1958)	2:25
10.	"Put My Little Shoes Away" (recorded June 26, 1956)	Traditional, arr. Wilbur Jones	"Wheel Hoss" B-side (1955)	2:33
11.	"Blue Moon of Kentucky" (recorded September 4, 1954)	Monroe	single A-side (1954)	2:08
12.	"The Gold Rush" (recorded August 23, 1967)	Monroe	"Virginia Darlin'" B-side (1968)	2:59
13.	"Close By" (recorded June 26, 1954)	Monroe; Robert Van Winkle	"Blue Moon of Kentucky" B-side (1954)	2:30
14.	"Memories of Mother and Dad" (recorded July 18, 1952)	Albert Price	"The Little Girl and the Dreadful Snake" B-side (1952)	2:54
15.	"Is the Blue Moon Still Shining" (recorded November 9, 1967)	Melissa Monroe	"Train 45 (Heading South)" B-side (1968)	3:25
16.	"Kentucky Mandolin" (recorded November 9, 1967)	Monroe	Kentucky Blue Grass (1970)	3:03
17.	"Footprints in the Snow" (recorded July 18, 1952)	Rupert Jones	"In the Pines" B-side (1952)	2:37
18.	"I'm Going Back to Old Kentucky" (recorded November 9, 1961)	Monroe	Bluegrass Ramble (1962)	2:23
19.	"The Little Girl and the Dreadful Snake" (recorded July 18, 1952)	Price	single A-side (1952)	3:06
20.	"Highway of Sorrow" (recorded April 23, 1951)	Monroe; Pete Pyle	single A-side (1951)	2:54
Total length:				54:46

== Personnel ==
- Bill Monroe — mandolin, vocals (lead on tracks 1, 2, 4–7, 9–11, 13, 15, 17, 18 and 20; tenor on tracks 1, 8, 14 and 19)
- Jimmy Martin — guitar (tracks 1, 14, 17 and 19), lead vocals (tracks 1, 14 and 19)
- Joe Stuart — guitar (track 2), fiddle (tracks 6 and 9)
- Carl Butler — guitar (tracks 3 and 4)
- Peter Rowan — guitar (track 5)
- Leslie Sandy — guitar (tracks 6 and 9)
- Jimmy Elrod — guitar (track 7)
- Edd Mayfield — guitar (tracks 8, 10, 11 and 13), lead vocals (track 8)
- Roland White — guitar (tracks 12, 15 and 16)
- Jimmy Maynard — guitar (track 18)
- Grady Martin — guitar (track 20)
- Loren "Jack" Shook — guitar (track 20)
- Rudy Lyle — banjo (tracks 1 and 20)
- Lonnie Hoppers — banjo (track 2)
- Curtis McPeake — banjo (tracks 3, 4 and 18)
- Lamar Grier — banjo (track 5)
- Don Stover — banjo (tracks 6 and 9)
- Don Lineberger — banjo (track 7)
- James "Gar" Bowers — banjo (track 8)
- Jim Smoak — banjo (tracks 10 and 13)
- Vic Jordan — banjo (tracks 12, 15 and 16)
- Sonny Osborne — banjo (tracks 14, 17 and 19)
- Merle "Red" Taylor — fiddle (tracks 1, 10, 11 and 13)
- Kenny Baker — fiddle (track 2)
- Dale Potter — fiddle (tracks 3, 4, 6 and 9)
- Norman "Buddy" Spicher — fiddle (tracks 5, 7 and 18)
- Richard Greene — fiddle (track 5)
- Gordon Terry — fiddle (tracks 6, 8–11 and 13)
- Horace "Benny" Williams — fiddle (tracks 7, 15 and 16)
- Charlie Cline — fiddle (tracks 10, 11, 13, 14, 17 and 19)
- Byron Berline — fiddle (track 12)
- Vassar Clements — fiddle (tracks 15 and 18)
- James "Hal" Smith — fiddle (track 20)
- Joel Price — string bass and baritone vocals (track 1)
- Bessie Lee Mauldin — string bass (tracks 2, 6, 9 and 18)
- Tony Ellis — string bass (tracks 3 and 4)
- James Monroe — string bass (tracks 5, 7, 12, 15 and 16)
- Oscar "Shorty" Shehan — string bass (track 8)
- Ernie Newton — string bass (tracks 10, 11, 13, 14, 17, 19 and 20)
- Ferris Coursey — drums (track 20)
