= Westway, Deaf Smith County, Texas =

- Unincorporated community
- Location within Texas Location within the United States
- Coordinates: 34°49′26″N 102°32′47″W
- Country: United States
- State: Texas
- County: Deaf Smith
- Elevation: 3,931 ft (1,198 m)
- Time zone: UTC-6 (Central (CST))
  - Summer (DST): UTC-5 (CDT)
- Area code: 806
- GNIS feature ID: 1380763

Westway is an unincorporated community in Deaf Smith County, in the U.S. state of Texas. According to the Handbook of Texas, the community had a population of 15 in 2000.

== Geography ==
Westway is located on Farm to Market Road 1058, 5 mi (8.0 km) west of Hereford in Deaf Smith County.

== Education ==
Today, the community is zoned for West Central Elementary School.
