= Best of Bill Monroe and his Blue Grass Boys =

Compilation album by Bill Monroe and his Blue Grass Boys
- Released: April 1975
- Recorded: 1947–1971
- Genre: Bluegrass; gospel
- Length: 50:55
- Label: MCA
- Producer: Art Satherley; Paul Cohen; Owen Bradley; Harry Silverstein; Walter Haynes

Bill Monroe chronology
Road of Life (1974)	Best of Bill Monroe and his Blue Grass Boys (1975)	The Best of Bill Monroe (1975)

Best of Bill Monroe and his Blue Grass Boys is a compilation album by American bluegrass musician Bill Monroe and his band, the Blue Grass Boys. Released by MCA Records in Europe only in April 1975, it contains 20 songs recorded between 1947 and 1971, all of which were previously released as singles, B-sides, or on other albums. The album was issued to coincide with a European tour by the band between late-April and mid-May 1975.

== Background ==
Best of Bill Monroe and his Blue Grass Boys was compiled by John Atkins, an "English authority on American country music", for release by MCA Records to mark the band's biggest European tour to date, between April and May 1975. Atkins also wrote the album's sleeve notes and a souvenir programme sold at shows on the tour. The album was Monroe's first to feature 20 songs, all of which had been previously released. The tracks "Devil's Dream" (originally released as a single in 1963) and "McKinley's March" (first issued as the B-side to "Walk Softly on My Heart" in 1970) were making their first appearances on an album to date.

== Track listing ==
Best of Bill Monroe and his Blue Grass Boys track listing
No.	Title	Writer(s)	Original release	Length
1.	"Mule Skinner Blues" (recorded January 13, 1971)	Jimmie Rodgers; George Vaughn Horton	Bill Monroe's Country Music Hall of Fame (1971)	2:44
2.	"Devil's Dream" (recorded March 20, 1963)	Traditional	"New John Henry Blues" B-side (1963)	2:25
3.	"Walking in Jerusalem (Just Like John)" (recorded July 18, 1952)	Bill Monroe	single A-side (1953)	2:01
4.	"Roanoke" (recorded December 31, 1954)	Joe Ahr	"Cheyenne" B-side (1955)	2:36
5.	"I'm Travelling On and On" (recorded October 28, 1947)	Monroe	"Shine Hallelujah Shine" B-side (1948)	2:36
6.	"Blue Moon of Kentucky" (recorded September 4, 1954)	Monroe	single A-side (1954)	2:08
7.	"I Saw the Light" (recorded February 25, 1958)	Hank Williams	I Saw the Light (1958)	2:27
8.	"Get Up John" (recorded November 28, 1953)	Monroe	"White House Blues" B-side (1954)	2:08
9.	"McKinley's March" (recorded January 19, 1970)	Monroe	"Walk Softly on My Heart" B-side (1970)	2:25
10.	"Whitehouse Blues" (recorded January 7, 1954)	Wilbur Jones	single A-side (1954)	2:13
11.	"Uncle Pen" (recorded October 15, 1950)	Monroe	"When the Golden Leaves Begin to Fall" B-side (1951)	2:42
12.	"Rawhide" (recorded January 20, 1951)	Monroe	"Letter from My Darlin" B-side (1952)	2:36
13.	"Footprints in the Snow" (recorded July 18, 1952)	Rupert Jones	single A-side (1952)	2:41
14.	"I'm Going Back to Old Kentucky" (recorded October 27, 1947)	Monroe	single A-side (1949)	2:56
15.	"Kentucky Mandolin" (recorded November 9, 1967)	Monroe	Kentucky Blue Grass (1970)	3:03
16.	"Molly and Tenbrooks" (recorded May 15, 1957)	Traditional	Knee Deep in Blue Grass (1958)	2:19
17.	"I'm Working on a Building" (recorded January 14, 1954)	A. P. Carter	single A-side (1954)	2:45
18.	"My Little Georgia Rose" (recorded February 3, 1950)	Monroe	"New Mule Skinner Blues" B-side (1950)	3:07
19.	"Don't Put Off 'Til Tomorrow" (recorded July 18, 1952)	Monroe; Pete Pyle	A Voice from on High (1969)	2:37
20.	"I'm on My Way Back to the Old Home" (recorded February 3, 1950)	Monroe	"First Whippoorwill" B-side (1952)	2:26
Total length:				50:55

== Personnel ==
- Bill Monroe — mandolin, vocals (lead on tracks 1, 3, 6, 10, 11, 13 and 16–20; tenor on tracks 3, 5, 7, 11, 14, 17 and 20)
- James Monroe — guitar (tracks 1 and 9), string bass (track 15)
- Horace "Benny" Williams — guitar (track 2), fiddle (track 15)
- Jimmy Martin — guitar (tracks 3, 8, 10–13 and 17–20), vocals (lead on tracks 11, 17 and 20; tenor on track 3)
- Claude "Jackie" Phelps — guitar (track 4)
- Robert "Chubby" Wise — guitar (track 5), fiddle (track 14)
- Edd Mayfield — guitar (tracks 6 and 7), lead vocals (track 7)
- Grady Martin — guitar (tracks 10 and 17)
- Lester Flatt — guitar (track 14), lead vocals (tracks 5 and 14)
- Roland White — guitar (track 15)
- Leslie Sandy — guitar (track 16)
- Earl Snead — banjo (track 1)
- Bill "Brad" Keith — banjo (track 2)
- Hubert Davis — banjo (track 4)
- Rudy Lyle — banjo (tracks 8, 10–12, 17, 18 and 20)
- Rual Yarbrough — banjo (track 9)
- Sonny Osborne — banjo (tracks 13 and 19)
- Earl Scruggs — banjo (track 14), baritone vocals (track 5)
- Vic Jordan — banjo (track 15)
- Don Stover — banjo (track 16)
- Kenny Baker — fiddle (tracks 1, 2 and 9), baritone vocals (track 7)
- Charlie Cline — fiddle (tracks 4, 6, 8, 10, 13, 17 and 19), baritone vocals (tracks 3 and 17)
- Bobby Hicks — fiddle (track 4)
- Merle "Red" Taylor — fiddle (tracks 6, 11 and 12)
- Gordon Terry — fiddle (tracks 6 and 16), bass vocals (track 7)
- Tommy Williams — fiddle (track 9)
- Dale Potter — fiddle (track 16)
- Vassar Clements — fiddle (tracks 18 and 20)
- Joe Stuart — string bass (track 1), fiddle (track 16)
- Bessie Lee Mauldin — string bass (tracks 2, 7 and 16)
- Ernie Newton — string bass (tracks 3, 4, 6, 8, 10, 13, 17 and 19)
- Joe Zinkan — string bass (track 9)
- Joel Price — string bass (tracks 11, 12, 18 and 20), baritone vocals (track 11)
- Howard "Cedric Rainwater" Watts — string bass (track 14), bass vocals (track 5)
- Boudleaux Bryant — bass vocals (track 3)
- Milton Estes — bass vocals (track 17)
