= Kelso, Texas =

Ghost town in Deaf Smith County, Texas

Coordinates: 35.0061°N 102.6333°W

Kelso is a ghost town in west-central Deaf Smith County, Texas, United States.

== History ==
Kelso was created as the basis of a massive confidence scam by George G. Wright to sell an 80,000-acre tract of XIT Ranch land 25 miles northwest of Hereford. Wright constructed a fake town which included a hotel, a general store, and a schoolhouse, none of which were occupied by permanent settlers. The many prospective land buyers brought to this town were the only guests of the hotel. The schoolhouse was never used and the "customers" buyers saw loading merchandise they had purchased at the general store were actors hired by Wright. The merchandise was simply replaced on the shelves when the land buyers had left. Wright also constructed a large barn and filled it with corn shipped in from Iowa.

Wright's fraud was so successful that the United States Postal Service briefly established a post office in Kelso that operated from 1907 to 1908. Wright and his associates, by misrepresenting the quality and value of the land, its distance from towns and stage of development, successfully sold parcels at prices from $8 to $40 an acre. To protect the scam, residents from the immediate surrounding area were not allowed on the special trains Wright chartered from Kansas City, and the land purchasers were prevented from mingling with local residents. Dryland farmers, who made up the preponderance of the buyers, realized too late that the town was fake and that deep-well irrigation was necessary to grow crops. By late 1907, Wright had sold the entire tract. The town of Kelso soon disappeared after proposals by the farmers to bring in a rail line were unsuccessful.
