= Simms, Deaf Smith County, Texas =

- Unincorporated community
- Location within Texas Location within the United States
- Coordinates: 35°2′00″N 102°39′28″W
- Country: United States
- State: Texas
- County: Deaf Smith
- Elevation: 4,118 ft (1,255 m)
- Time zone: UTC-6 (Central (CST))
  - Summer (DST): UTC-5 (CDT)
- Area code: 806
- GNIS feature ID: 1380544

Simms is an unincorporated community in Deaf Smith County, in the U.S. state of Texas. According to the Handbook of Texas, the community had a population of 10 in 2000.

== Education ==
Today, the community is served by the Walcott Independent School District.
