= La Plata, Texas =

Uninhabited town in the United States of America

Coordinates: 34.9701°N 102.5987°W

La Plata is a ghost town in Deaf Smith County, Texas, United States. It was originally named Grenada and was established in 1890 by the XIT Ranch as a means of consolidating political power after Deaf Smith County was established. The town engaged in a controversial battle with neighboring Ayr over the county seat election, which was mired in corruption. After Grenada won the election, county judge J. R. Dean changed the town's name to La Plata due to a request from postal officials. A courthouse was built and the town soon added a post office, a school, a county jail, and a Presbyterian church. Businesses included a general store, a pharmacy, a saloon, a hotel, an implement house, a blacksmith shop, a livery stable, and the offices which housed the county's first newspaper, La Plata Star.

Poor weather played a role in the town's slow population growth; from 1891 to 1894, the area suffered a drought, which caused considerable problems for farmers and ranchers. A major blizzard occurred in February 1897, and below-freezing temperatures settled in for 21 consecutive days at the same time. More than half of the town's population abandoned the town during this time. In 1899, the Pecos and Northern Texas Railway was built through the southern part of Deaf Smith County and into New Mexico, bypassing La Plata. On November 8 of that year, a new county-seat election was held and the new town of Blue Water (later renamed Hereford) won because it was served by the railroad. Nine houses, the courthouse, and the jail were disassembled and moved to Blue Water by wagon. Nothing remains of La Plata today except some graves in the cemetery, which is located on private land that has since been reclaimed for farming. La Plata's original portable jail is on display at the Deaf Smith County Museum in Hereford.

The town was the focal point of the fictional short story The End of the Whole Mess. by Stephen King.
