= Hereford High School =

Hereford High School may refer to:

- Aylestone School, a school in Hereford, England, formed by the merger of Hereford High School for Girls and Hereford High School for Boys
- Hereford High School, Parkton, a school in Maryland, U.S.
- Hereford High School (Texas), a school in Hereford, Texas, U.S.
