= Ford, Texas =

- Unincorporated community
- Location within Texas Location within the United States
- Coordinates: 35°06′13″N 102°24′04″W
- Country: United States
- State: Texas
- County: Deaf Smith
- Elevation: 3,980 ft (1,210 m)
- Time zone: UTC-6 (Central (CST))
  - Summer (DST): UTC-5 (CDT)
- Area code: 806
- GNIS feature ID: 1357541

Ford is an unincorporated community in Deaf Smith County, in the U.S. state of Texas. According to the Handbook of Texas, the community had a population of 15 in 2000.

== Geography ==
Ford is located at the junction of U.S. Route 385 and Farm to Market Road 2587 in northeastern Deaf Smith County.

== Education ==
Today, the community is served by the Vega Independent School District.
