= Parker Bridwell =

American baseball pitcher (born 1991)

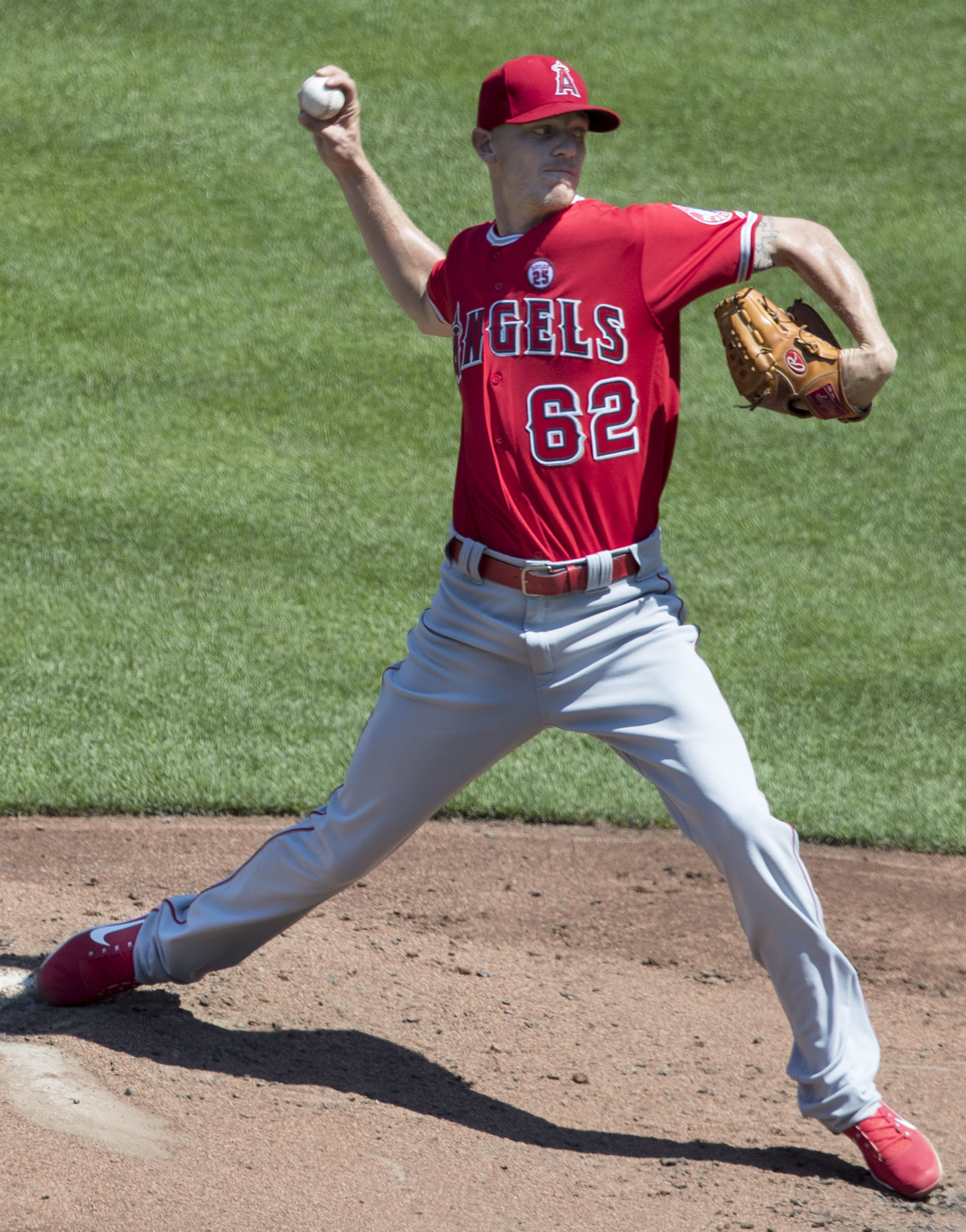
- Bridwell with the Los Angeles Angels
- Pitcher
- Born: August 2, 1991 (age 35); Hereford, Texas, U.S.
- Batted: Right Threw: Right

MLB debut
- August 21, 2016, for the Baltimore Orioles

Last MLB appearance
- September 30, 2018, for the Los Angeles Angels

MLB statistics
- Win–loss record: 11–3
- Earned run average: 4.60
- Strikeouts: 79
- Stats at Baseball Reference

Teams
- Baltimore Orioles (2016); Los Angeles Angels (2017–2018)

Parker Alan Bridwell (born August 2, 1991) is an American former professional baseball pitcher. The Baltimore Orioles selected Bridwell in the ninth round of the 2010 MLB draft. He played in Major League Baseball (MLB) for the Orioles and the Los Angeles Angels.

== Career ==
=== Amateur career ===
Bridwell attended Hereford High School in Hereford, Texas, where he was a three-sport athlete, playing baseball, American football, and basketball. In American football, he played quarterback and punter. In baseball, he played as a pitcher, and was named to the All-State third-team by the Texas Sports Writers Association. He committed to attend Texas Tech University and play college baseball and college football for the Texas Tech Red Raiders.

=== Baltimore Orioles ===
The Baltimore Orioles selected Bridwell in the ninth round, with the 268th overall pick, of the 2010 Major League Baseball draft. The Orioles offered Bridwell a $750,000 signing bonus. When MLB refused to approve it, he signed with Baltimore for a $625,000 bonus. In 2011, Bridwell played for the Aberdeen Ironbirds of the Low–A New York–Penn League, and was named their Opening Day starting pitcher. Bridwell spent two seasons with the Delmarva Shorebirds of the Single–A South Atlantic League. In 2014, he pitched for the Frederick Keys of the High–A Carolina League. On May 19, he was named the Carolina League's pitcher of the week. The Orioles assigned Bridwell to the Arizona Fall League after the 2014 season. Bridwell played for the Bowie Baysox of the Double–A Eastern League in 2015, and was added to the Orioles' 40-man roster after the season.

Bridwell began the 2016 season with the Norfolk Tides of the Triple–A International League. The Orioles promoted him to the major leagues on August 21. He pitched in two games for Baltimore. In the second, he allowed a grand slam, and he was optioned to the minor leagues after the game.

=== Los Angeles Angels ===
The Orioles traded Bridwell to the Los Angeles Angels for cash considerations on April 17, 2017. He earned a spot in the Angels' starting rotation. Bridwell got his first extended look in the majors, pitching in 21 games, 20 starts, 73 strikeouts in 121 innings. He finished with a 10–3 record with a 3.64 ERA. His nine straight road wins to begin a career was tied with the Brooklyn Dodgers' Clem Labine for second-longest such streak all-time, behind that of Whitey Ford.

Bridwell did not pitch in most of the 2018 season due to right elbow inflammation. He was 1–0 in 6 2/3 innings. On November 20, 2018, he was designated for assignment.

The New York Yankees claimed Bridwell off waivers on November 26, 2018. The Yankees designated Bridwell for assignment on December 17. Bridwell was re-claimed by the Angels on December 21. He was once again designated for assignment on January 15, 2019. On January 22, Bridwell was claimed off waivers by the Oakland Athletics. Bridwell was outrighted off the roster on January 25, and was released by the organization on April 6.

On April 9, 2019, Bridwell re–signed with the Angels on a minor league contract. In 22 games (12 starts) for the Triple–A Salt Lake Bees, he compiled a 6–6 record and 8.12 ERA with 79 strikeouts over 88 2/3 innings pitched. Bridwell elected free agency following the season on November 4.

=== Minnesota Twins ===
On January 28, 2020, Bridwell signed a minor league contract with the Minnesota Twins. Bridwell did not play in a game in 2020 due to the cancellation of the minor league season because of the COVID-19 pandemic. He became a free agent on November 2.
