= Walcott Independent School District =

School district in Texas

Walcott Independent School District is a private school district in southwestern Deaf Smith County, Texas (USA).

The district has one school - Walcott Elementary - that serves students in grades pre-kindergarten through six. Secondary school students living in the district attend Hereford Junior High and Hereford High School.

The Walcott Elementary was named a National Blue Ribbon School in 2004 and 2018.

In 2009, the school district was rated "exemplary" by the Texas Education Agency.

== Controversy ==
In July 2024, the ACLU of Texas sent Walcott Independent School District a letter, alleging that the district's 2023-2024 dress and grooming code appeared to violate the Texas CROWN Act, a state law which prohibits racial discrimination based on hair texture or styles, and asking the district to revise its policies for the 2024-2025 school year.
