= Ayr, Texas =

Ayr is a ghost town in Deaf Smith County, Texas, United States. It was established in the spring of 1890 as an intended spur of the Fort Worth and Denver City Railway to create a shipping point for Roswell, New Mexico, ranches. It was named for the Scottish town of Ayr. Settlers began arriving quickly that spring, and a store and post office were established. As was common at the time, a battle to obtain county seat status ensued between Ayr and another town named Grenada (later renamed La Plata), which had been established by the XIT Ranch. In a contested election, La Plata won the election by a wide margin, and as a result, the rail spur was never built. The town site was abandoned by 1895.
