= Hereford High School (Texas) =

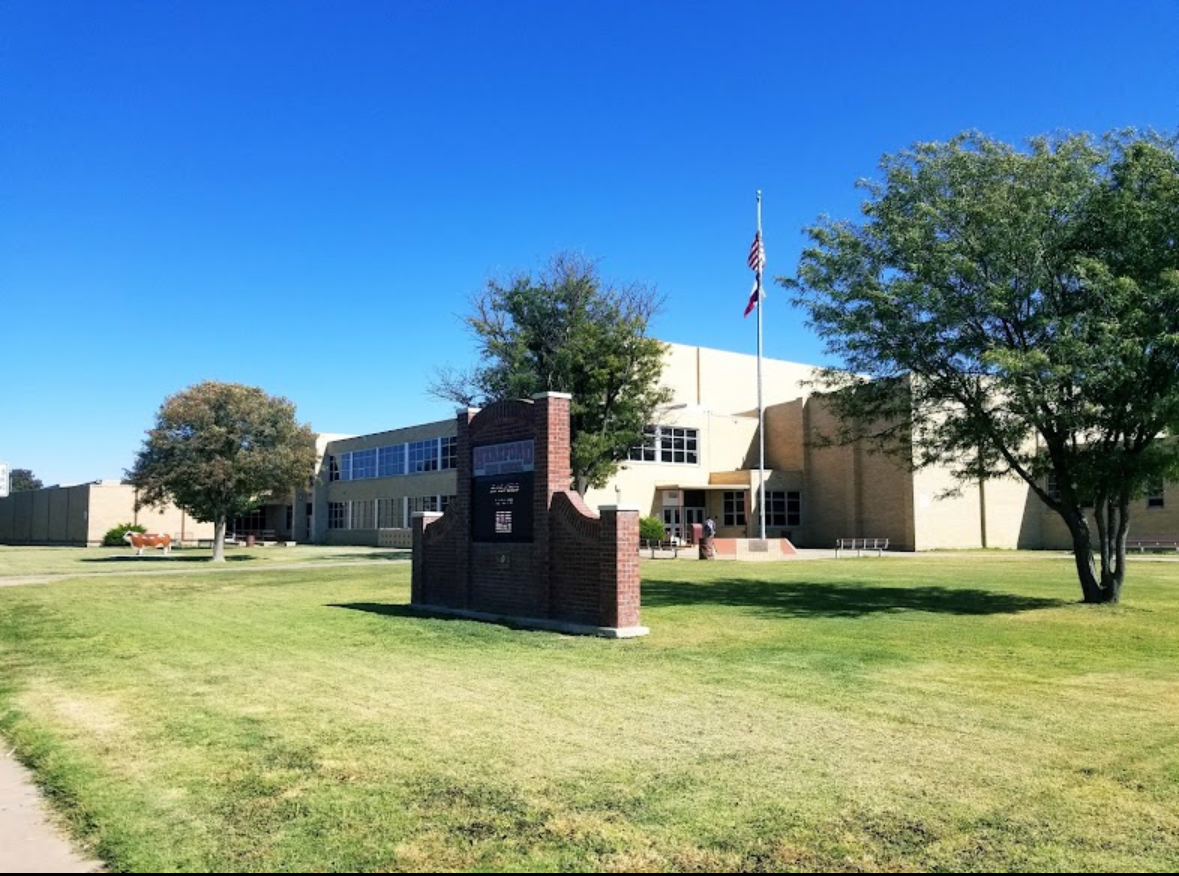

Location
- 200 Avenue F Hereford, Texas 79045; United States
- Coordinates: 34.8259°N 102.3958°W

Information
- School type: Public high school
- Motto: HPND (Herd Pride Never Dies)
- Established: 1889
- School district: Hereford Independent School District
- Principal: Cuca Alonzo
- Teaching staff: 84.70 (FTE)
- Grades: 9-12
- Enrollment: 1,177 (2023–2024)
- Student to teacher ratio: 13.90
- Colors: Maroon & White
- Athletics conference: UIL Class 4A
- Mascot: Hostile Herd, Herd, Whitefaces/Lady Whitefaces
- Yearbook: The Round-Up
- Website: https://hhs.herefordisd.net/

Hereford High School is a public high school located in Hereford, Texas, United States and classified as a 4A school by the University Interscholastic League (UIL). It is part of the Hereford Independent School District located in central Deaf Smith County. In 2016, the school was rated "Met Standard" by the Texas Education Agency.

== Athletics ==
The Hereford Whitefaces compete in the following sports:

- Baseball
- Basketball
- Cross Country
- Football
- Golf
- Softball
- Tennis
- Track
- Volleyball
- Wrestling

=== State titles ===
- Girls Cross Country
  - 2005(4A), 2006(4A), 2007(4A)
- Volleyball
  - 1996(4A), 1997(4A), 1999(4A), 2001(4A), 2008(4A)
- Team Tennis
  - 2020(4A)

== Notable alumni ==
- Parker Bridwell, baseball player
