= Deaf Smith Electric Cooperative =

US non-profit electric utility cooperative

Deaf Smith Electric Cooperative, Inc. is a non-profit rural electric utility cooperative headquartered in Hereford, Texas. The cooperative was organized in 1936 and is a member of the Golden Spread Electric Cooperative. The cooperative is named for the county where it was founded, which is in turn named for Erastus "Deaf" Smith, a partially deaf scout and soldier who served in the Texas Revolution.

Deaf Smith Electric Cooperative serves the Texas counties of Deaf Smith, Castro and Parmer as well as part of Oldham County. The cooperative annually awards two $2000 scholarships to high school seniors in Texas.
