= Thomas Edd Mayfield =

American musician

- Born: April 12, 1926; Dawn, Texas, U.S.
- Died: July 7, 1958 (aged 32); Bluefield, West Virginia, U.S.
- Occupation: Musician
- Spouse(s): Jo McLain Mayfield, later Jo Butler (married ca. 1948-his death)
- Children: Freddie Calvin Mayfield; Carl Mayfield

Notes
- 1 While his brothers, Herbert Mayfield and Smokey Mayfield, remained in West Texas, Edd Mayfield went on tour with Bill Monroe and the Bluegrass Boys. (2) Edd Mayfield died within a week of having been diagnosed with leukemia while he was in concert with Monroe in West Virginia.

Thomas Edward "Edd" Mayfield (April 12, 1926 – July 7, 1958) was an American bluegrass singer and guitarist, mostly known for being a member of Bill Monroe and the Blue Grass Boys band during the 1950s. Edd Mayfield and two of his brothers, Smokey Mayfield (1924–2008) of Spearman and Herbert Mayfield (1920–2008) of Dimmitt, were part of the Mayfield Brothers Country band in West Texas.

== Biography ==
Mayfield was born in Dawn in Deaf Smith County, southwest of Amarillo, to William Fletcher Mayfield (died 1952) and the former Penelope Drake (died 1937). The family was involved in music, rodeo, and ranching. Mayfield served in the Pacific theater of World War II.

The Mayfield Brothers were offered a recording contract, but turned it down because of the business of the family's Green Valley Ranch. In 1951, Bill Monroe's guitarist, Carter Stanley, left the band, and Monroe, who had heard of Mayfield, offered him the vacant slot as guitarist in the Bluegrass Boys. At the time he joined the Bluegrass Boys, Edd Mayfield was described as "a handsome, tough-as-barbed-wire cowpuncher, who literally grew up on a ranch, who could ride hard, lasso accurately, and literally toss and tie up a bull. . . and had the wiry strength of a gymnast."

In early 1958, Mayfield returned to Monroe for the last time. He contracted leukemia, became ill while on the road with the band, and within three days of being stricken, died at a hospital in Bluefield, West Virginia. He was 32. Services for Mayfield were held at the First Baptist Church in Dimmitt. The burial took place at Castro County Memorial Cemetery. Mayfield was married to Jo McLain and the couple had two sons, Freddie and Carl. After Mayfield's death, his sons were raised by his brother Smokey.
