= Deaf Smith County, Texas =

County in Texas, United States

- County
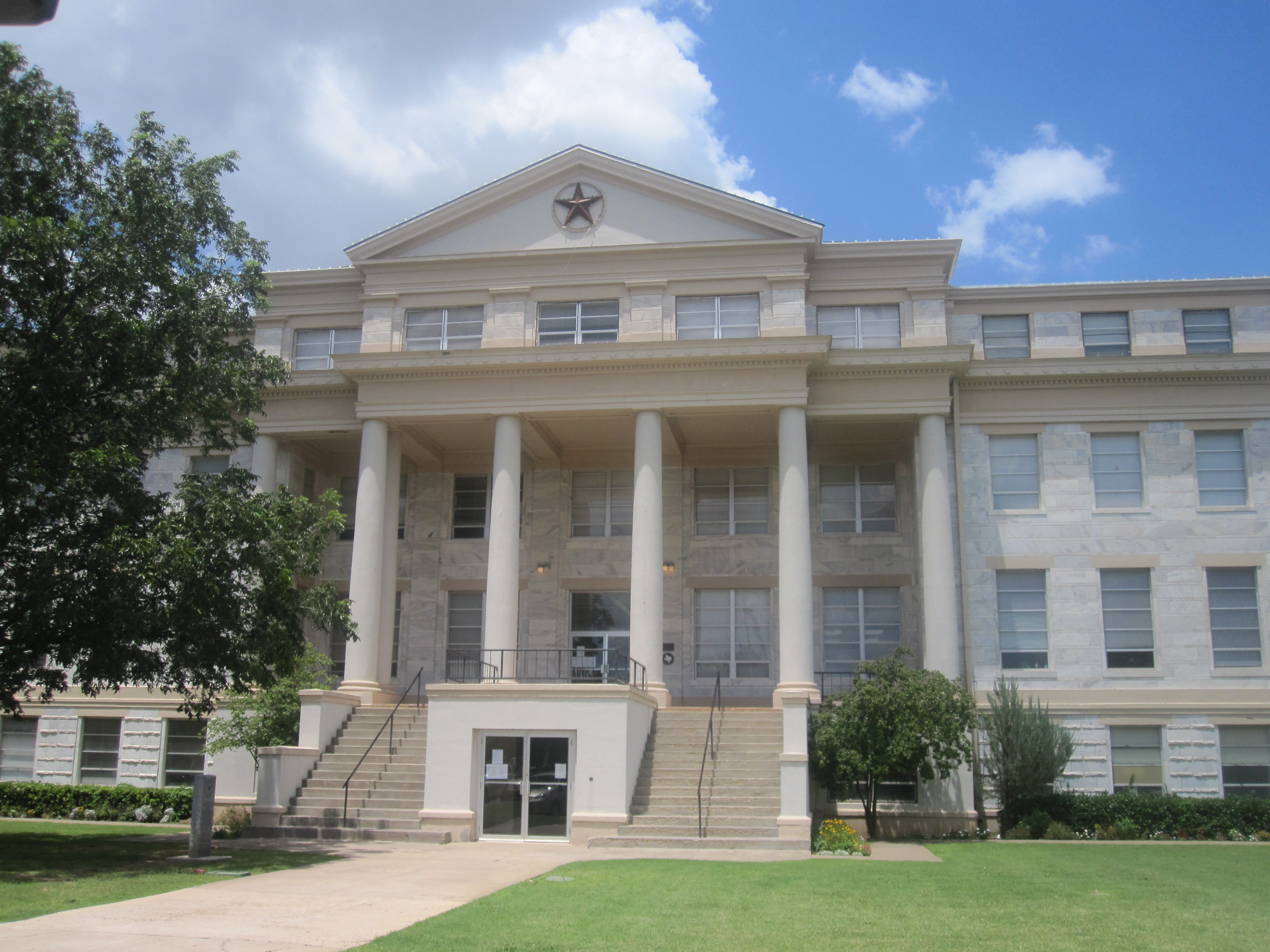
- Deaf Smith County Courthouse in Hereford

- Location within the U.S. state of Texas
- Coordinates: 34°58′N 102°36′W
- Country: United States
- State: Texas
- Founded: 1890
- Named for: Erastus "Deaf" Smith
- Seat: Hereford
- Largest city: Hereford

Area
  - Total: 1,498 sq mi (3,880 km^{2})
  - Land: 1,497 sq mi (3,880 km^{2})
  - Water: 1.5 sq mi (3.9 km^{2}) 0.1%

Population (2020)
  - Total: 18,583
  - Estimate (2025): 18,626 ▲
  - Density: 12/sq mi (4.6/km^{2})
- Time zone: UTC−6 (Central)
  - Summer (DST): UTC−5 (CDT)
- Congressional district: 13th
- Website: www.co.deaf-smith.tx.us

Deaf Smith County is a county located in the U.S. state of Texas. As of the 2020 census, the population was 18,583. The county seat is Hereford, which is known as the "Beef Capital of the World". The county was created in 1876 and later organized in 1890. The Hereford, TX Micropolitan Statistical Area includes all of Deaf Smith County.

== History ==
In 1876, the state legislature defined and named the county, but it was not organized until 1890, with the town of La Plata as the original county seat. The county was named for Erastus "Deaf" Smith (1787–1837), a partially deaf scout and soldier who served in the Texas Revolution, and was the first to reach the Alamo after its fall in 1836. The pronunciation of "Deaf", as used by Smith himself, is /diːf/ DEEF; however, most residents pronounce it /dɛf/ DEF.

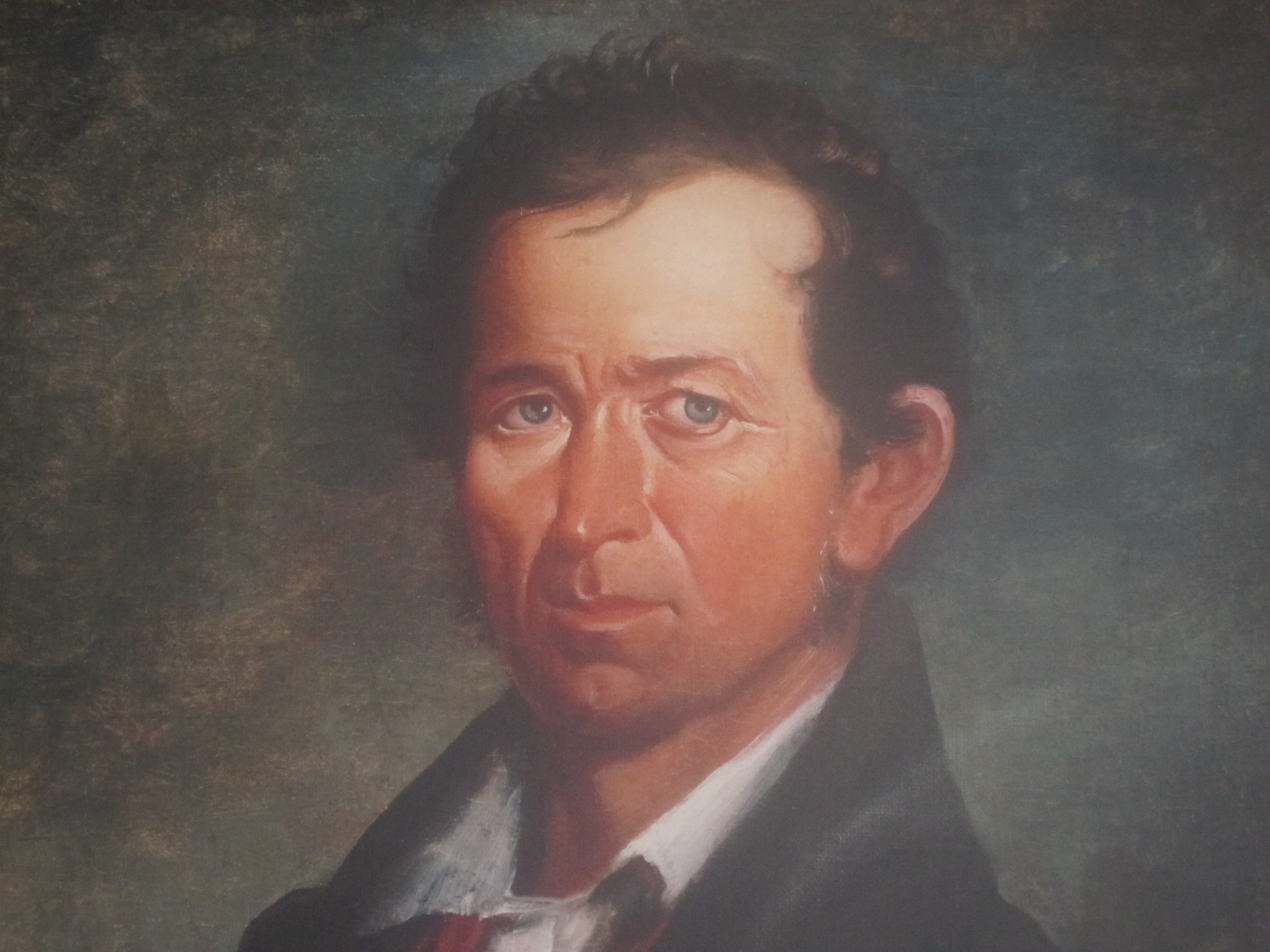
Deaf Smith as he appears at the Deaf Smith County Museum

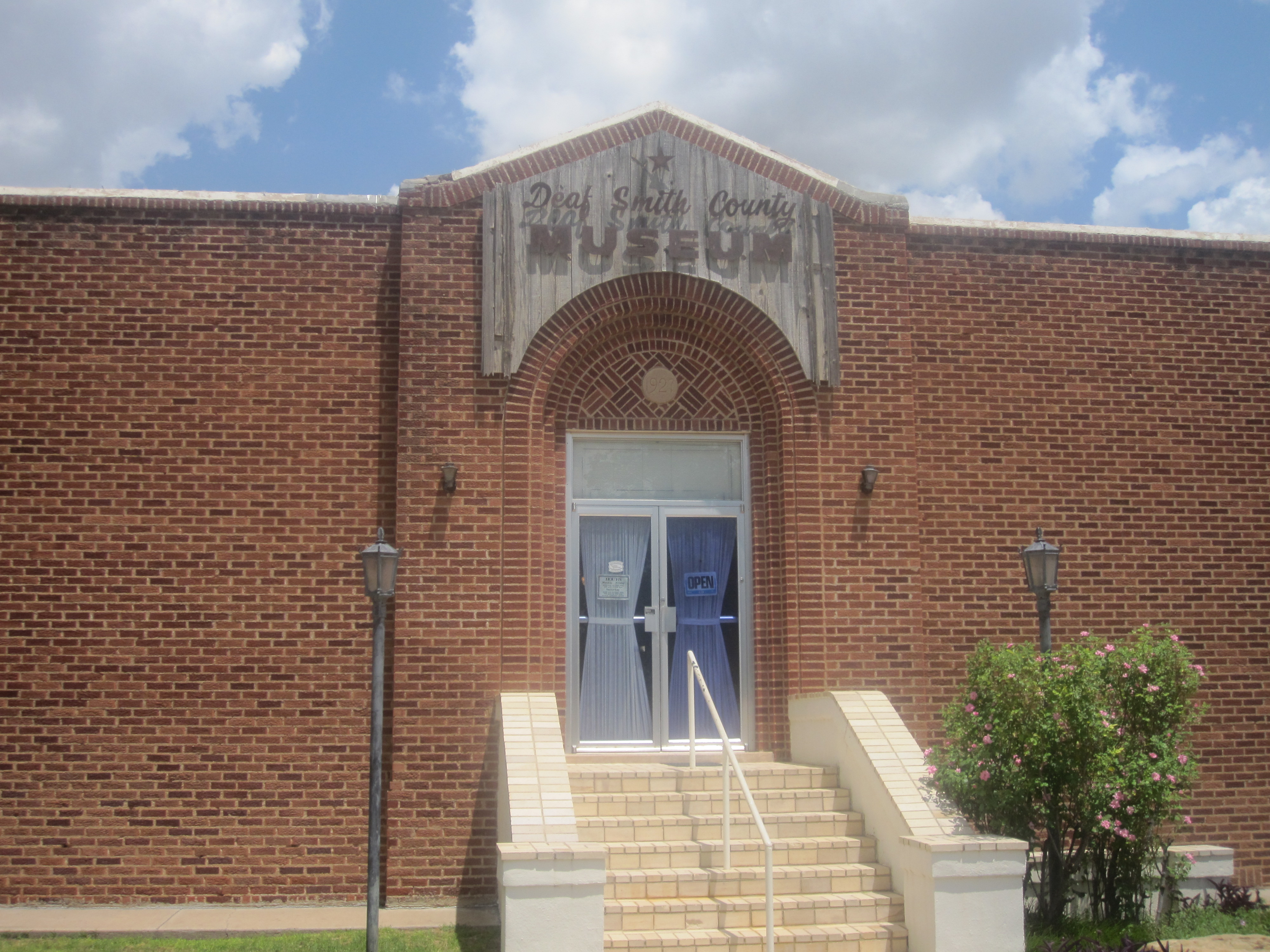
The Deaf Smith County Historical Museum in Hereford

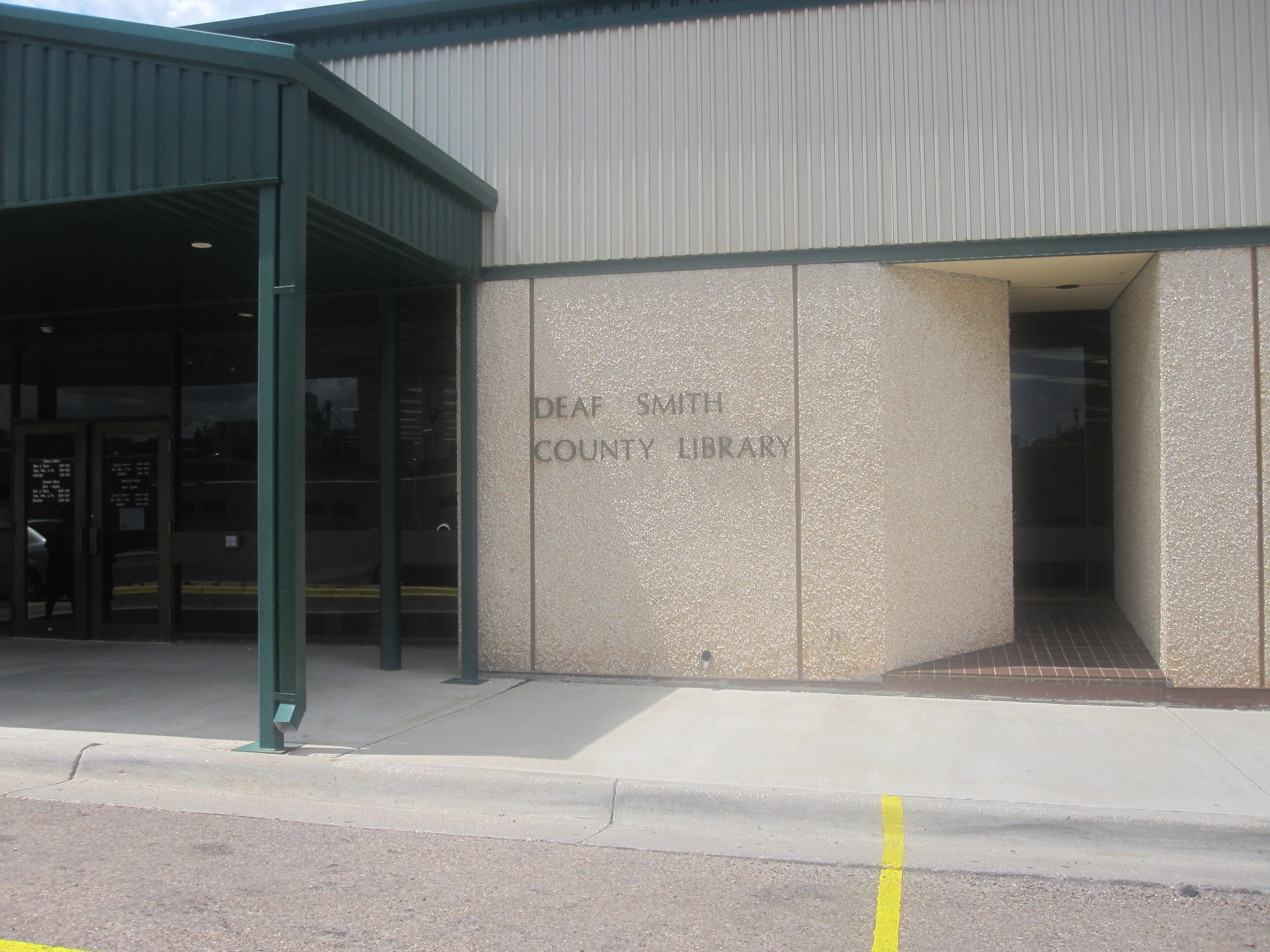
The Deaf Smith County Library formerly housed the National Cowgirl Hall of Fame on the ground floor. The museum is now located in a new building in the Historic District of Fort Worth.

== Geography ==
According to the U.S. Census Bureau, the county has a total area of 1,498 sq mi (3,880 km^{2}), of which 1,497 sq mi (3,880 km^{2}) are land and 1.5 sq mi (3.9 km^{2}) (0.1%) are covered by water.

=== Major highways ===
- I-40
  - I-40 BS (Glenrio)
- US 60
- US 385
- SH 214
- Loop 211

=== Adjacent counties ===
- Oldham County (north)
- Potter County (northeast)
- Randall County (east)
- Castro County (southeast)
- Parmer County (south)
- Curry County, New Mexico (southwest/Mountain Time Zone)
- Quay County, New Mexico (west/Mountain Time Zone)

== Demographics ==
Historical population
Census	Pop.	Note	%±
1880	38		—
1890	179		371.1%
1900	843		370.9%
1910	3,942		367.6%
1920	3,747		−4.9%
1930	5,979		59.6%
1940	6,056		1.3%
1950	9,111		50.4%
1960	13,187		44.7%
1970	18,999		44.1%
1980	21,165		11.4%
1990	19,153		−9.5%
2000	18,561		−3.1%
2010	19,372		4.4%
2020	18,583		−4.1%
2025 (est.)	18,626	▲	0.2%
U.S. Decennial Census; 1850–2010 2010 2020

=== 2020 census ===
As of the 2020 census, the county had a population of 18,583. The median age was 33.0 years. 30.3% of residents were under the age of 18 and 13.9% of residents were 65 years of age or older. For every 100 females there were 100.9 males, and for every 100 females age 18 and over there were 99.8 males age 18 and over.

The racial makeup of the county was 48.7% White, 0.9% Black or African American, 1.1% American Indian and Alaska Native, 0.3% Asian, <0.1% Native Hawaiian and Pacific Islander, 24.2% from some other race, and 24.7% from two or more races. Hispanic or Latino residents of any race comprised 74.9% of the population.

83.5% of residents lived in urban areas, while 16.5% lived in rural areas.

There were 6,263 households in the county, of which 43.1% had children under the age of 18 living in them. Of all households, 50.3% were married-couple households, 18.7% were households with a male householder and no spouse or partner present, and 24.3% were households with a female householder and no spouse or partner present. About 20.7% of all households were made up of individuals and 9.5% had someone living alone who was 65 years of age or older.

There were 6,974 housing units, of which 10.2% were vacant. Among occupied housing units, 62.7% were owner-occupied and 37.3% were renter-occupied. The homeowner vacancy rate was 1.4% and the rental vacancy rate was 6.5%.

=== Racial and ethnic composition ===
Deaf Smith County, Texas – Racial and ethnic composition Note: the US Census treats Hispanic/Latino as an ethnic category. This table excludes Latinos from the racial categories and assigns them to a separate category. Hispanics/Latinos may be of any race.
Race / Ethnicity (NH = Non-Hispanic)	Pop 2000	Pop 2010	Pop 2020	% 2000	% 2010	% 2020
White alone (NH)	7,491	5,939	4,233	40.36%	30.66%	22.78%
Black or African American alone (NH)	247	158	107	1.33%	0.82%	0.58%
Native American or Alaska Native alone (NH)	61	52	47	0.33%	0.27%	0.25%
Asian alone (NH)	37	56	44	0.20%	0.29%	0.24%
Pacific Islander alone (NH)	4	2	0	0.02%	0.01%	0.00%
Other race alone (NH)	7	29	40	0.04%	0.15%	0.22%
Mixed race or Multiracial (NH)	60	97	187	0.32%	0.50%	1.01%
Hispanic or Latino (any race)	10,654	13,039	13,925	57.40%	67.31%	74.93%
Total	18,561	19,372	18,583	100.00%	100.00%	100.00%

=== 2000 census ===
As of the 2000 census, 18,561 people, 6,180 households, and 4,832 families resided in the county. The population density was 12 people/mi^{2} (4.6 people/km^{2}). The 6,914 housing units averaged 5 per square mile (1.9/km^{2}). The racial makeup of the county was 72.28% White, 1.51% African American, 0.80% Native American, 0.25% Asian, 0.13% Pacific Islander, 22.92% from other races, and 2.11% from two or more races. About 57.40% of the population was Hispanic or Latino of any race.

Of the 6,180 households, 41.00% had children under 18 living with them, 61.00% were married couples living together, 12.60% had a female householder with no husband present, and 21.80% were not families. Around 19.70% of all households was made up of individuals, and 10.00% had someone living alone who was 65 years of age or older. The average household size was 2.96 and the average family size was 3.41.

In the county, the age distribution was 33.30% under 18, 9.60% from 18 to 24, 25.50% from 25 to 44, 19.40% from 45 to 64, and 12.10% who were 65 or older. The median age was 31 years. For every 100 females, there were 95.50 males. For every 100 females age 18 and over, there were 91.90 males.

The median income for a household was $29,601, and for a family was $32,391. Males had a median income of $26,090 versus $19,113 for females. The per capita income for the county was $13,119. About 19.30% of families and 20.60% of the population were below the poverty line, including 26.30% of those under age 18 and 15.70% of those age 65 or over.

== Infrastructure ==
The headquarters of the Deaf Smith Electric Cooperative are located in Hereford. The cooperative provides electricity for Deaf Smith, as well as Castro, Parmer, and Oldham Counties.

== Communities ==
=== City ===
- Hereford (county seat)

=== Unincorporated communities ===
- Dawn
- Ford
- Glenrio (partly in Quay County, New Mexico)
- Milo Center
- Simms
- Westway

=== Ghost towns ===
- Ayr
- Bootleg
- Kelso
- La Plata

== Politics ==
Deaf Smith County is located within District 86 of the Texas House of Representatives. Deaf Smith County is located within District 31 of the Texas Senate.

United States presidential election results for Deaf Smith County, Texas
Year	Republican		Democratic		Third party(ies)	
Year	No.	%	No.	%	No.	%
1912	21	7.81%	221	82.16%	27	10.04%
1916	77	17.04%	356	78.76%	19	4.20%
1920	205	30.78%	459	68.92%	2	0.30%
1924	192	25.16%	538	70.51%	33	4.33%
1928	570	58.10%	411	41.90%	0	0.00%
1932	198	13.16%	1,307	86.84%	0	0.00%
1936	142	10.24%	1,236	89.11%	9	0.65%
1940	423	25.68%	1,219	74.01%	5	0.30%
1944	508	28.14%	1,117	61.88%	180	9.97%
1948	535	25.61%	1,496	71.61%	58	2.78%
1952	2,468	70.86%	1,006	28.88%	9	0.26%
1956	1,685	55.16%	1,361	44.55%	9	0.29%
1960	2,024	60.44%	1,299	38.79%	26	0.78%
1964	1,793	46.01%	2,094	53.73%	10	0.26%
1968	2,474	52.49%	1,545	32.78%	694	14.73%
1972	3,690	73.67%	1,240	24.76%	79	1.58%
1976	2,776	51.08%	2,613	48.08%	46	0.85%
1980	4,073	69.46%	1,666	28.41%	125	2.13%
1984	4,762	75.79%	1,485	23.64%	36	0.57%
1988	3,744	65.39%	1,930	33.71%	52	0.91%
1992	3,137	56.43%	1,642	29.54%	780	14.03%
1996	3,051	60.44%	1,655	32.79%	342	6.77%
2000	3,687	73.98%	1,240	24.88%	57	1.14%
2004	4,139	78.23%	1,133	21.41%	19	0.36%
2008	3,466	73.06%	1,247	26.29%	31	0.65%
2012	3,042	70.60%	1,239	28.75%	28	0.65%
2016	2,911	69.05%	1,185	28.11%	120	2.85%
2020	3,294	71.45%	1,264	27.42%	52	1.13%
2024	3,233	75.43%	1,019	23.78%	34	0.79%

United States Senate election results for Deaf Smith County, Texas1
Year	Republican		Democratic		Third party(ies)	
Year	No.	%	No.	%	No.	%
2024	3,113	73.68%	1,025	24.26%	87	2.06%

United States Senate election results for Deaf Smith County, Texas2
Year	Republican		Democratic		Third party(ies)	
Year	No.	%	No.	%	No.	%
2020	3,273	72.20%	1,151	25.39%	109	2.40%
2026	1,989	56.46%	1,459	41.41%	75	2.13%

Texas Gubernatorial election results for Deaf Smith County
Year	Republican		Democratic		Third party(ies)	
Year	No.	%	No.	%	No.	%
2022	2,281	77.40%	635	21.55%	31	1.05%
2026	2,086	58.86%	1,407	39.70%	51	1.44%

== Education ==
School districts:

- Adrian Independent School District
- Friona Independent School District
- Hereford Independent School District
- Vega Independent School District
- Walcott Independent School District
- Wildorado Independent School District

All of the county is in the service area of Amarillo College.

== See also ==
- List of museums in the Texas Panhandle
- Margaret Clark Formby
- National Register of Historic Places listings in Deaf Smith County, Texas
- Recorded Texas Historic Landmarks in Deaf Smith County
