= Hereford Independent School District =

School district in Texas

Location
- Hereford, TX ESC Region 16 USA

District information
- Type: Public
- Motto: Committed to Children - Dedicated to Excellence
- Grades: PK through 12
- Superintendent: Dr. Ralph Carter

Students and staff
- Athletic conference: UIL Class AAAA
- Colors: Maroon and White

Other information
- Mascot: Whiteface (the facial feature of the Hereford cattle breed)
- Website: Hereford ISD

Hereford Independent School District is a public school district based in Hereford, Texas (USA). In 2009, the school district was rated "academically acceptable" by the Texas Education Agency.

== Schools ==
- Hereford High School (Grades 9–12)
  - The school mascot (the whiteface) is named for the distinctive facial feature of the Hereford cattle breed for which the school and city are named.
- Hereford Center for Accelerated Learning (HCAL) (Alternative High School)
- Hereford Preparatory Academy (Grade 8)
- Hereford Junior High (Grades 6 & 7)
  - HJH met AYP (Adequate Yearly Progress ) for the 2011–2012 school year
- Aikman Elementary (Grades K-5)
- Bluebonnet Elementary (Grades K-5)
- Northwest Elementary (Grades K-5)
- West Central Elementary (Grades K-5)
- Tierra Blanca Early Childhood Center (Pre-School)
