= Hereford, Texas =

Hereford
- City
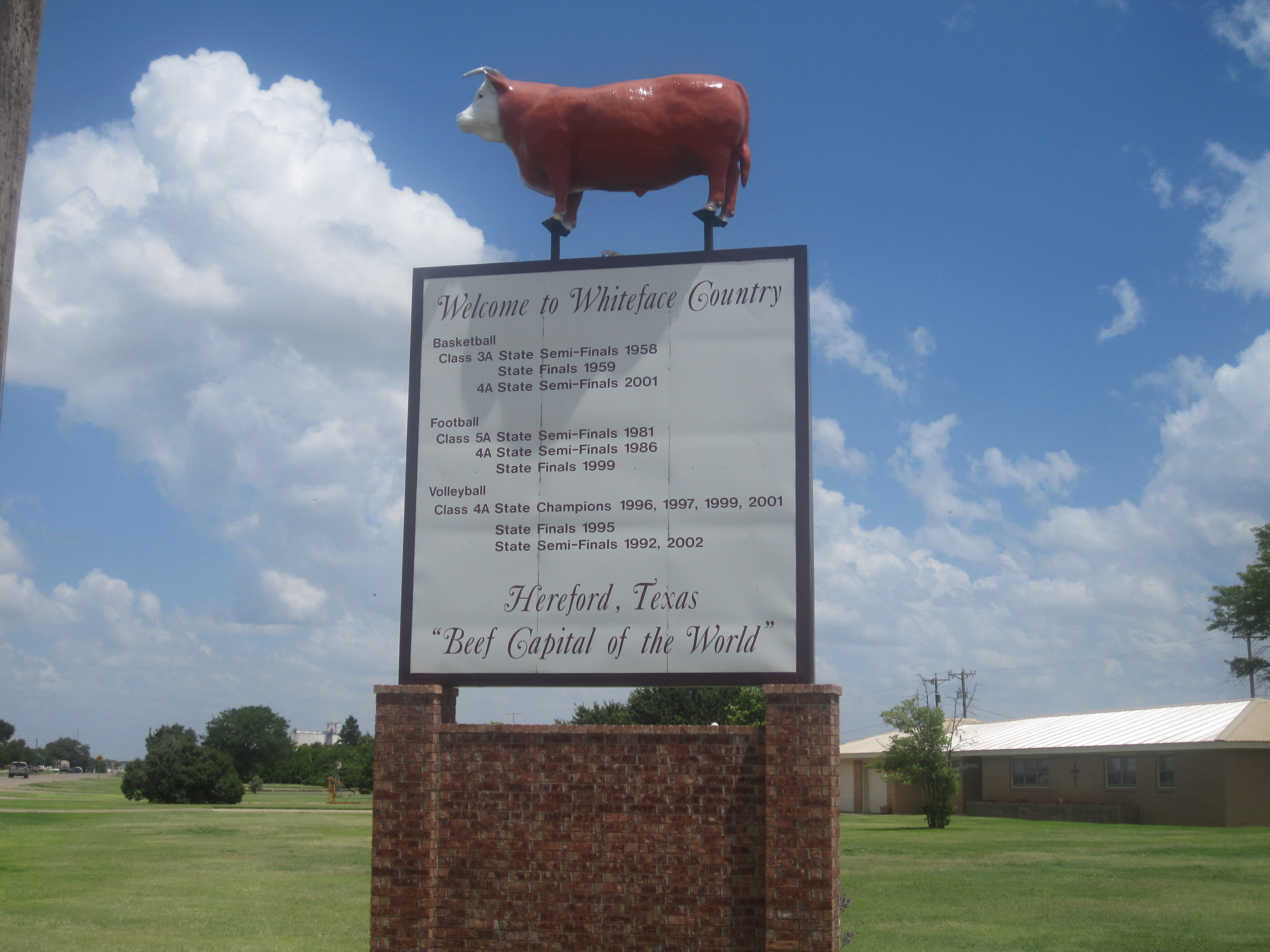
- Hereford welcome sign on U.S. Highway 385
- Nicknames: Beef Capital of the World; The Town Without a Toothache
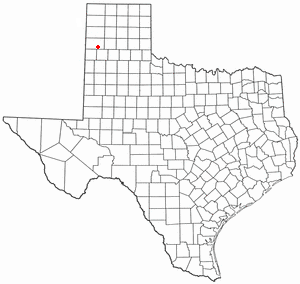
- Location of Hereford, Texas

- Coordinates: 34°49′22″N 102°23′55″W
- Country: United States of America
- State: Texas
- County: Deaf Smith

Government

Area
  - Total: 6.30 sq mi (16.32 km^{2})
  - Land: 6.30 sq mi (16.32 km^{2})
  - Water: 0 sq mi (0.00 km^{2})
- Elevation: 3,819 ft (1,164 m)

Population (2020)
  - Total: 14,972
  - Density: 2,376/sq mi (917.4/km^{2})
- Time zone: UTC-6 (Central (CST))
  - Summer (DST): UTC-5 (CDT)
- ZIP code: 79045
- Area code: 806
- FIPS code: 48-33320
- GNIS feature ID: 2410747
- Website: www.herefordtexas.gov

Hereford (/ˈhɜːrfərd/ HUR-fərd) is a city in and the county seat of Deaf Smith County, Texas, United States. It is 48 miles southwest of Amarillo. Its population was 14,972 at the 2020 census. It is the only incorporated locality named "Hereford" in the United States.

The area is known for its semiarid climate, with heavy farming and ranching throughout the area sustained by irrigation from the Ogallala Aquifer and the saltier Santa Rosa Aquifer beneath it.

Hereford's local water supply contains an unusually high level of naturally occurring fluoride. Because fluoride is used to protect against tooth decay, Hereford earned the title "The Town Without a Toothache".

It is also known as the "Beef Capital of the World" because of the large number of cattle feedlots in the area. The city is named for the Hereford breed. The local economy is affected significantly by growth in the dairy and ethanol industries.

Hereford is also home to the headquarters of the Deaf Smith Electric Cooperative, which serves Deaf Smith, Castro, Parmer, and Oldham Counties.

== History ==
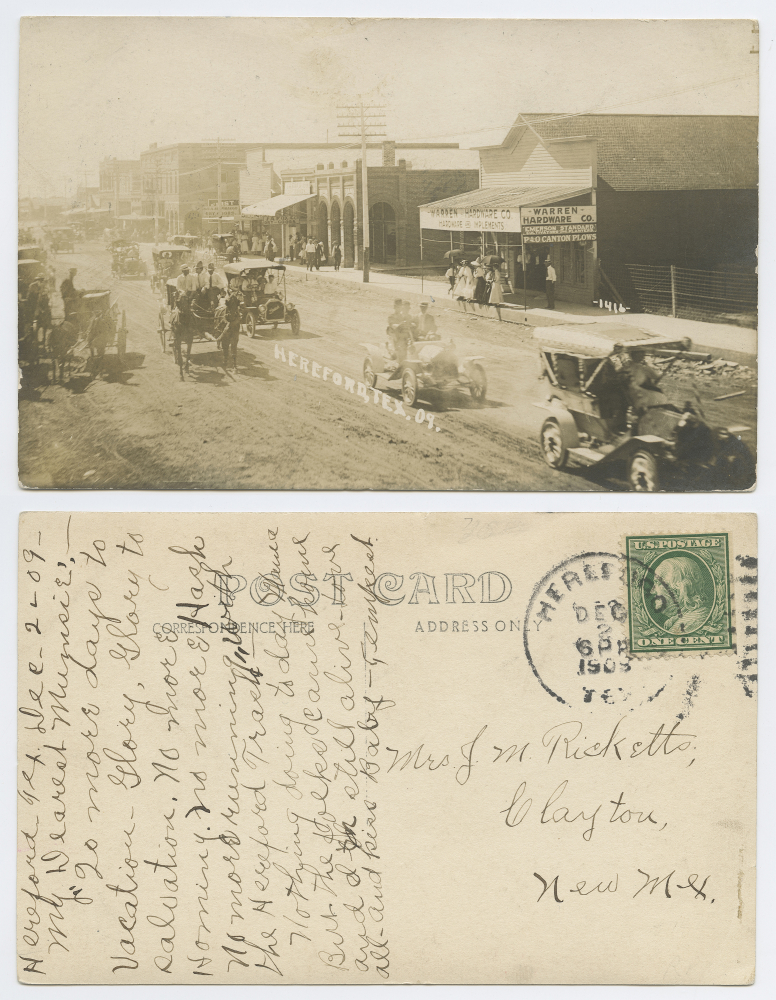
Hereford in 1909

Hereford was founded as "Blue Water" in 1899 after the Pecos and Northern Texas Railway connected Amarillo to Farwell. After a town already named Blue Water was discovered, residents renamed the town "Hereford" in honor of the cattle of the local ranchers and the city, Hereford, in the United Kingdom.

During World War II, a prisoner-of-war camp existed there for Italian prisoners of war. It was dismantled in 1947.

In 1975, popular high school teacher Wayne Woodward was fired for his efforts to establish a local branch of the American Civil Liberties Union. Mr. Woodward won a subsequent legal suit, that gained national attention, against the Hereford Independent School District. The events were documented in the 2022 book You Will Never Be One of Us by Timothy P. Bowman.

A rich Western heritage includes the Las Escarbadas ranch house of the XIT Ranch, once located southwest of Hereford. The restored historic structure can now be seen at the National Ranching Heritage Center at Texas Tech University in Lubbock. The Deaf Smith County Historical Museum at 400 Sampson Street in Hereford offers indoor and outdoor exhibits on the settlement of West Texas.

Hereford was once known as the "Windmill City" due to its many windmills supplying fresh water from the Ogallala Aquifer.

== Geography ==
Hereford is located in southeastern Deaf Smith County and on the Llano Estacado. According to the United States Census Bureau, the city has a total area of 5.9 square miles (15.4 km^{2}), all land.

U.S. Highway 60 passes through the city as 1st Street, leading northeast 48 miles (77 km) to Amarillo and southwest 57 miles (92 km) to Clovis, New Mexico. U.S. Highway 385 (25 Mile Avenue) runs north–south through the city, leading north 30 miles (48 km) to Interstate 40 at Vega and south 20 miles (32 km) to Dimmitt.

== Climate ==
Hereford's climate is classified as a steppe climate (BSk) using the 2006 map of Köppen climate classification, meaning it is semiarid. Hereford was named as the "coolest" city in Texas with an average summer temperature of 73 °F or 22.8 °C.

Climate data for Hereford, Texas (1991–2020 normals, extremes 1905–1912, 1936–present)
Month	Jan	Feb	Mar	Apr	May	Jun	Jul	Aug	Sep	Oct	Nov	Dec	Year
Record high °F (°C)	84 (29)	87 (31)	99 (37)	99 (37)	103 (39)	111 (44)	109 (43)	107 (42)	102 (39)	97 (36)	87 (31)	82 (28)	111 (44)
Mean maximum °F (°C)	71.0 (21.7)	76.2 (24.6)	84.3 (29.1)	89.5 (31.9)	96.0 (35.6)	102.1 (38.9)	101.4 (38.6)	99.2 (37.3)	95.8 (35.4)	89.3 (31.8)	79.7 (26.5)	71.4 (21.9)	104.1 (40.1)
Mean daily maximum °F (°C)	51.1 (10.6)	55.5 (13.1)	64.3 (17.9)	72.4 (22.4)	81.1 (27.3)	90.2 (32.3)	92.4 (33.6)	90.7 (32.6)	83.5 (28.6)	72.6 (22.6)	60.3 (15.7)	51.1 (10.6)	72.1 (22.3)
Daily mean °F (°C)	36.8 (2.7)	40.4 (4.7)	48.3 (9.1)	56.1 (13.4)	65.7 (18.7)	75.4 (24.1)	78.6 (25.9)	77.1 (25.1)	69.7 (20.9)	57.9 (14.4)	45.8 (7.7)	37.4 (3.0)	57.4 (14.1)
Mean daily minimum °F (°C)	22.5 (−5.3)	25.3 (−3.7)	32.4 (0.2)	39.7 (4.3)	50.3 (10.2)	60.6 (15.9)	64.8 (18.2)	63.5 (17.5)	55.8 (13.2)	43.3 (6.3)	31.3 (−0.4)	23.8 (−4.6)	42.8 (6.0)
Mean minimum °F (°C)	9.3 (−12.6)	11.1 (−11.6)	18.4 (−7.6)	26.5 (−3.1)	36.9 (2.7)	51.4 (10.8)	59.0 (15.0)	56.9 (13.8)	43.7 (6.5)	28.2 (−2.1)	16.6 (−8.6)	8.9 (−12.8)	4.2 (−15.4)
Record low °F (°C)	−15 (−26)	−17 (−27)	1 (−17)	14 (−10)	16 (−9)	40 (4)	51 (11)	44 (7)	31 (−1)	15 (−9)	0 (−18)	−12 (−24)	−17 (−27)
Average precipitation inches (mm)	0.64 (16)	0.45 (11)	1.22 (31)	1.09 (28)	2.09 (53)	3.34 (85)	2.34 (59)	3.04 (77)	1.86 (47)	1.85 (47)	0.69 (18)	0.72 (18)	19.33 (491)
Average snowfall inches (cm)	3.2 (8.1)	1.7 (4.3)	1.9 (4.8)	0.7 (1.8)	0.1 (0.25)	0.0 (0.0)	0.0 (0.0)	0.0 (0.0)	0.0 (0.0)	0.6 (1.5)	2.5 (6.4)	3.6 (9.1)	14.3 (36)
Average precipitation days (≥ 0.01 in)	2.8	3.2	4.3	4.8	6.4	7.6	6.9	8.3	5.7	5.2	3.7	3.6	62.5
Average snowy days (≥ 0.1 in)	1.7	1.2	1.0	0.3	0.1	0.0	0.0	0.0	0.0	0.2	0.9	1.8	7.2
Source: NOAA

== Demographics ==
Historical population
Census	Pop.	Note	%±
1900	532		—
1910	1,750		228.9%
1920	1,696		−3.1%
1930	2,458		44.9%
1940	2,584		5.1%
1950	5,207		101.5%
1960	6,752		29.7%
1970	13,414		98.7%
1980	15,853		18.2%
1990	14,745		−7.0%
2000	14,597		−1.0%
2010	15,370		5.3%
2020	14,972		−2.6%
U.S. Decennial Census

=== 2020 census ===
As of the 2020 census, Hereford had a population of 14,972. The median age was 31.8 years. 30.9% of residents were under the age of 18 and 13.1% of residents were 65 years of age or older. For every 100 females there were 98.9 males, and for every 100 females age 18 and over there were 97.8 males age 18 and over.

The 2020 census found that 99.6% of residents lived in urban areas, while 0.4% lived in rural areas.

The 2020 census reported 4,975 households in Hereford, of which 43.9% had children under the age of 18 living in them. Of all households, 48.0% were married-couple households, 18.5% were households with a male householder and no spouse or partner present, and 26.3% were households with a female householder and no spouse or partner present. About 21.2% of all households were made up of individuals and 9.6% had someone living alone who was 65 years of age or older.

The 2020 census counted 5,481 housing units, of which 9.2% were vacant. The homeowner vacancy rate was 1.6% and the rental vacancy rate was 7.1%.

Racial composition as of the 2020 census
Race	Number	Percent
White	6,947	46.4%
Black or African American	156	1.0%
American Indian and Alaska Native	167	1.1%
Asian	48	0.3%
Native Hawaiian and Other Pacific Islander	3	0.0%
Some other race	3,871	25.9%
Two or more races	3,780	25.2%
Hispanic or Latino (of any race)	11,878	79.3%

=== 2010 census ===
As of the 2010 United States census, 15,370 people resided in the city. The racial makeup of the city was 71.7% Hispanic or Latino, 26.3% White, 0.9% Black, 0.2% Native American, 0.3% Asian, 0.1% from some other race, and 0.5% from two or more races.

=== 2000 census ===
As of the census of 2000, 14,597 people, 4,839 households, and 3,730 families resided in the city. The population density was 2,600.8 inhabitants per square mile (1,004.2/km^{2}). The 5,323 housing units averaged 948.4 per square mile (366.3/km^{2}). The racial makeup of the city was 69.86% White, 1.76% African American, 0.82% Native American, 0.26% Asian, 0.12% Pacific Islander, 24.77% from other races, and 2.41% from two or more races. Hispanics or Latinos of any race were 61.37% of the population.

Of the 4,839 households, 42.2% had children under the age of 18 living with them, 58.4% were married couples living together, 14.4% had a female householder with no husband present, and 22.9% were not families. About 20.7% of all households were made up of individuals, and 11.3% had someone living alone who was 65 years of age or older. The average household size was 2.96 and the average family size was 3.44.

In the city, the population was distributed as 34.0% under the age of 18, 9.9% from 18 to 24, 25.6% from 25 to 44, 18.1% from 45 to 64, and 12.4% who were 65 years of age or older. The median age was 30 years. For every 100 females, there were 92.7 males. For every 100 females age 18 and over, there were 87.7 males.

The median income for a household in the city was $29,599, and for a family was $33,387. Males had a median income of $26,488 versus $18,920 for females. The per capita income for the city was $12,787. About 19.4% of families and 20.2% of the population were below the poverty line, including 25.9% of those under age 18 and 15.8% of those age 65 or over.

In December 2015, the Seattle Post-Intelligencer voted Hereford not only the "most conservative" city in Texas, but also in the United States, in terms of political contributions.

== Education ==
The first public school was opened in 1900. Today, Hereford's seven public schools serve around 4,000 students and are directed by the Hereford Independent School District.

== Notable people ==
- Parker Bridwell, pitcher for MLB's Baltimore Orioles, was born in Hereford.
- Ron Ely, actor, best remembered for his role as Tarzan on an NBC television series in the 1960s, was born in Hereford in 1938
- Lon L. Fuller (1902–1978), American legal philosopher known for his advocacy of a secular form of natural law theory, was born in Hereford
- Rip Hawk, professional wrestler, lived in Hereford, after retiring from wrestling.
- Edgar Mitchell (1930–2016), who on Apollo 14 in 1971 became the sixth astronaut to walk on the Moon, was born in Hereford.
- Skeeter Skelton, lawman and firearms writer

== Gallery ==
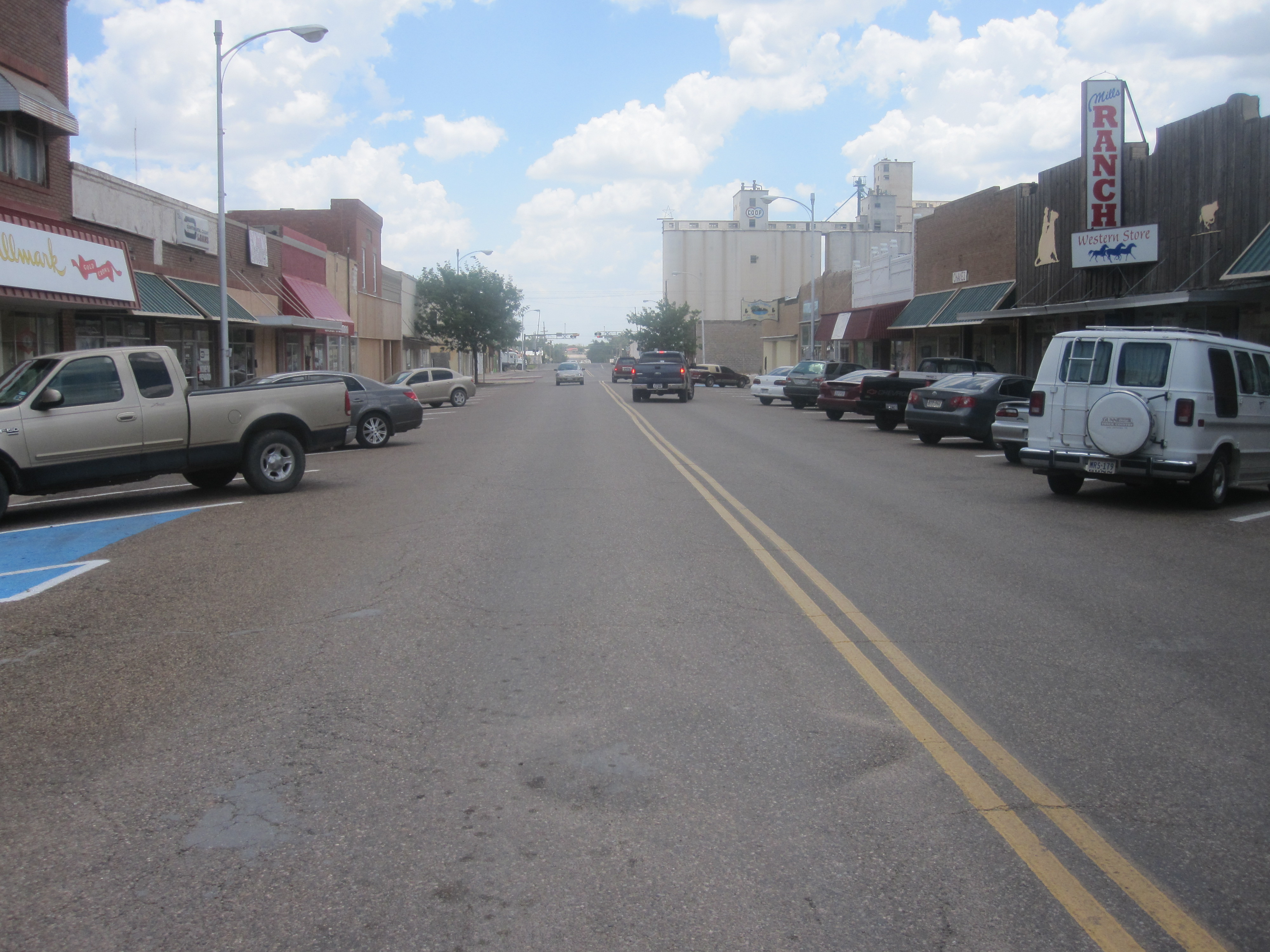
Downtown Hereford, with the grain elevator to the rear

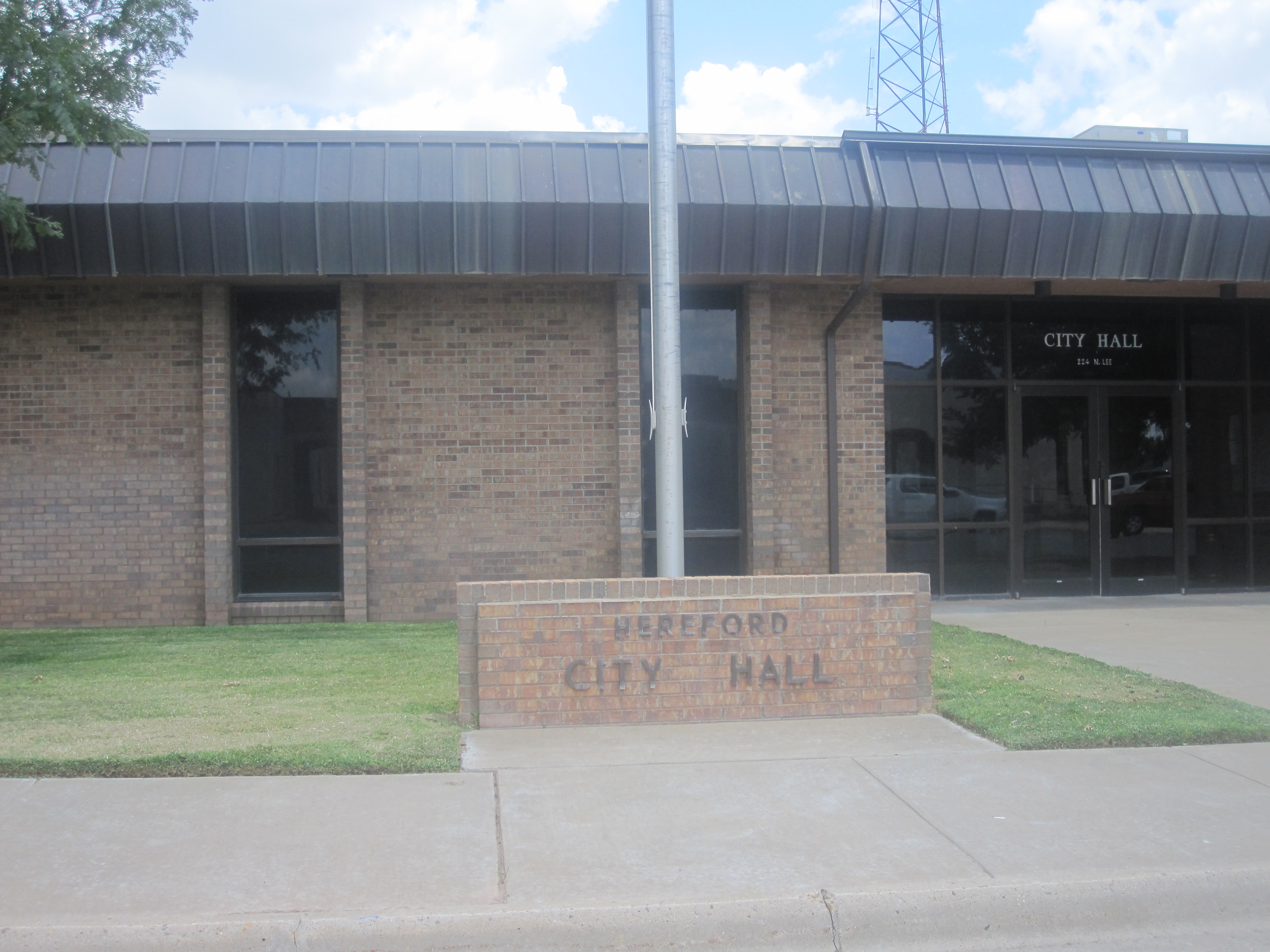
Hereford City Hall

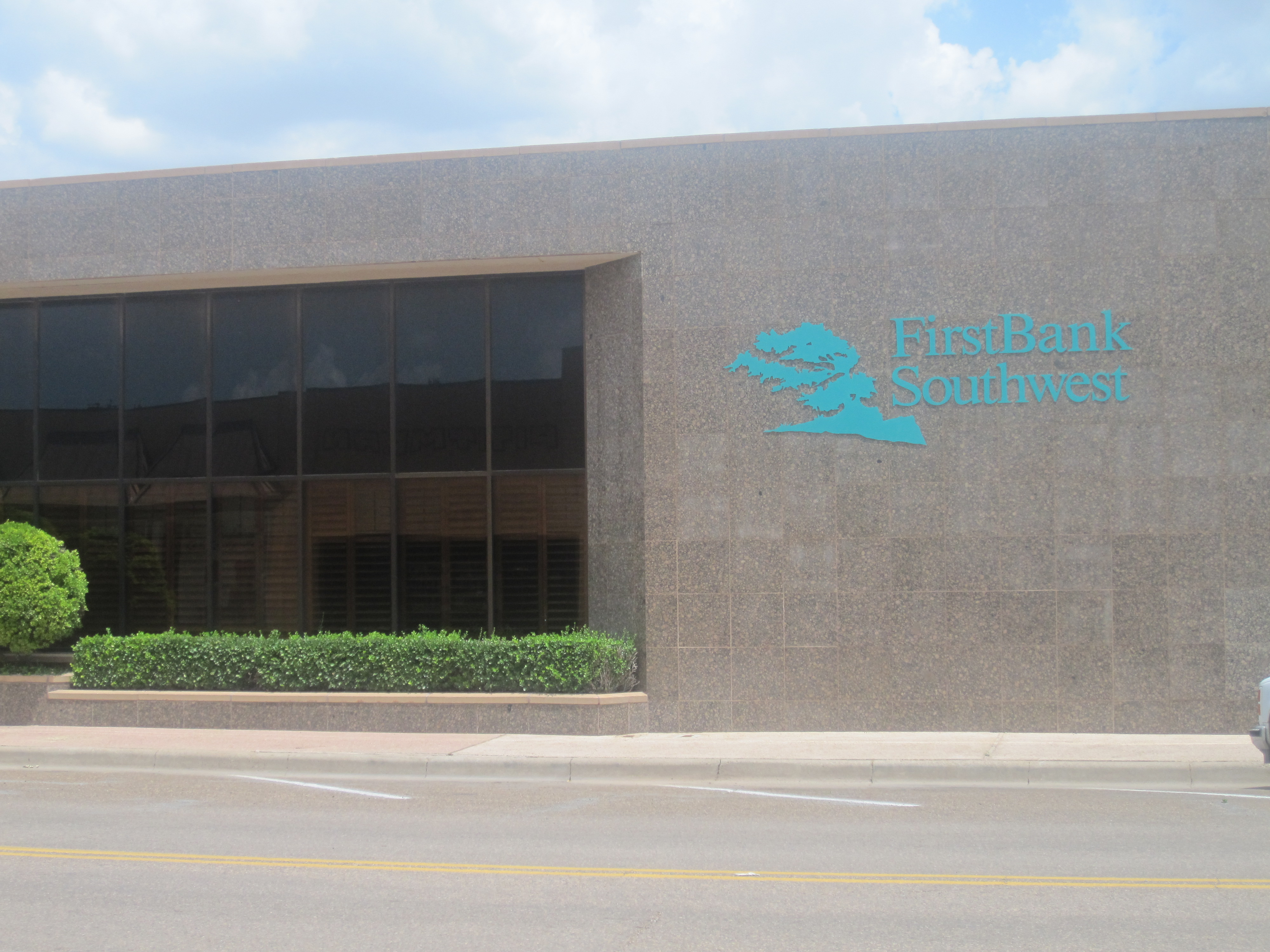
First Bank Southwest in Hereford

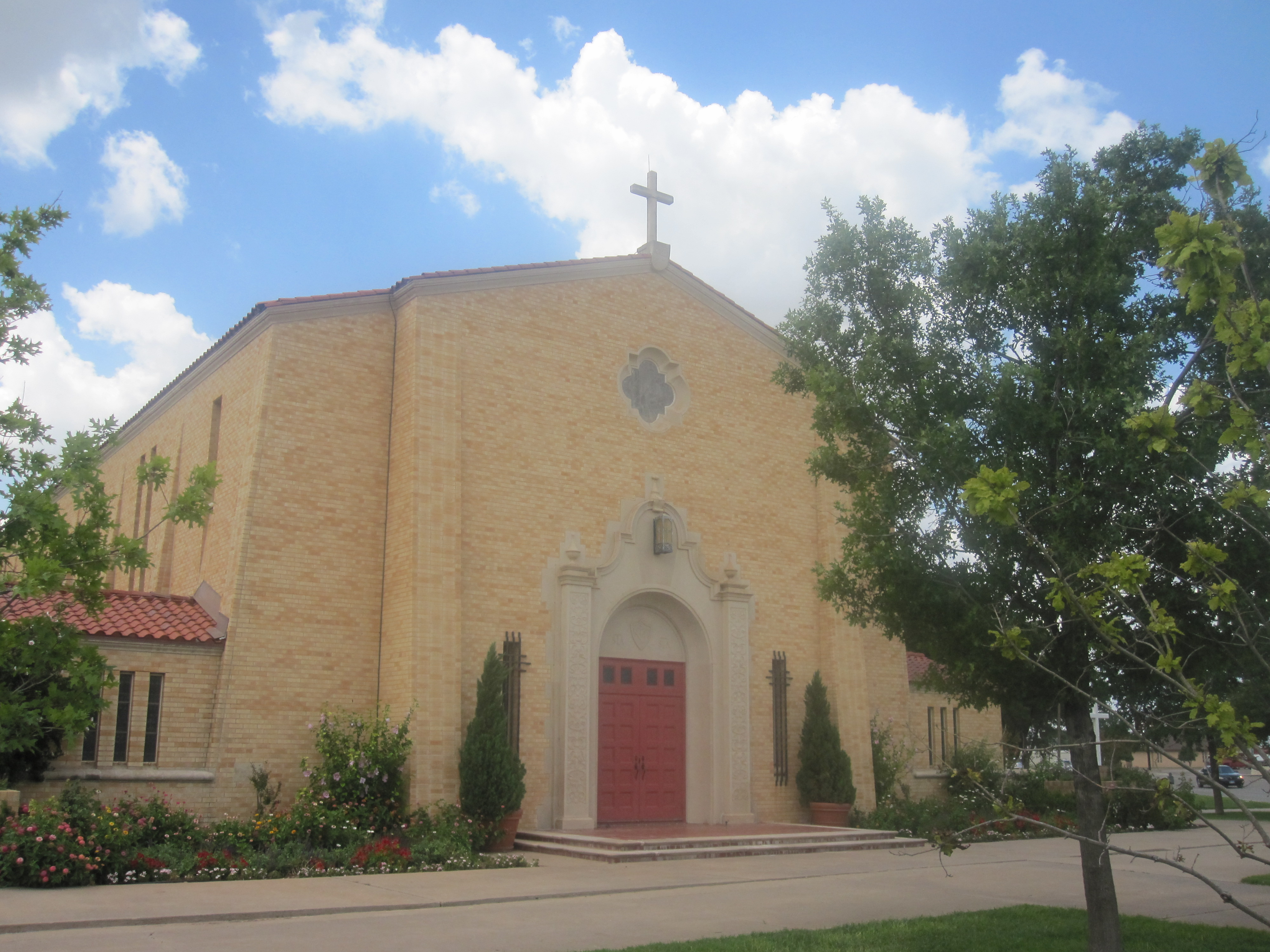
St. Anthony's Roman Catholic Church in Hereford is located off U.S. Highway 385.

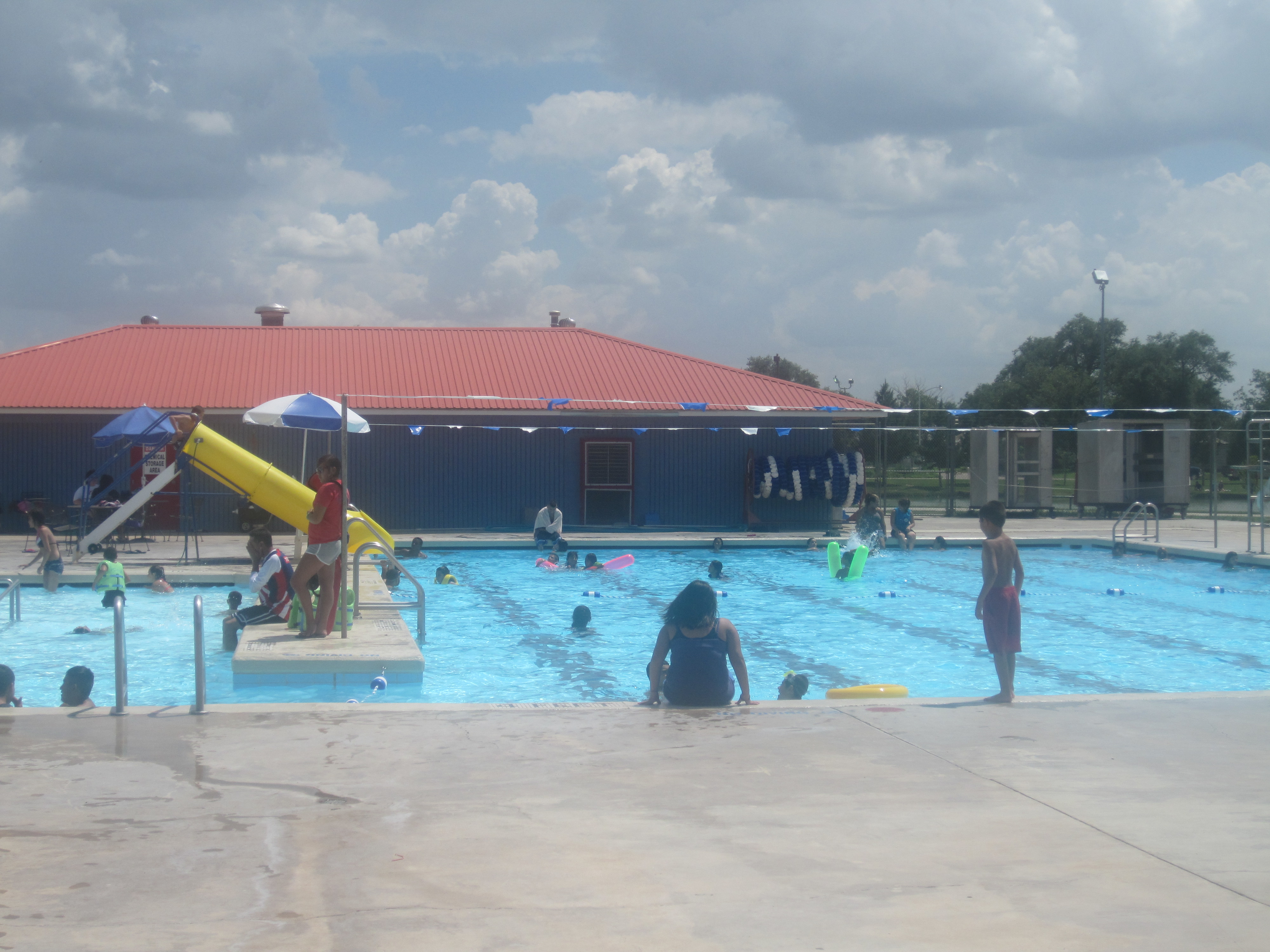
Swimming in Hereford

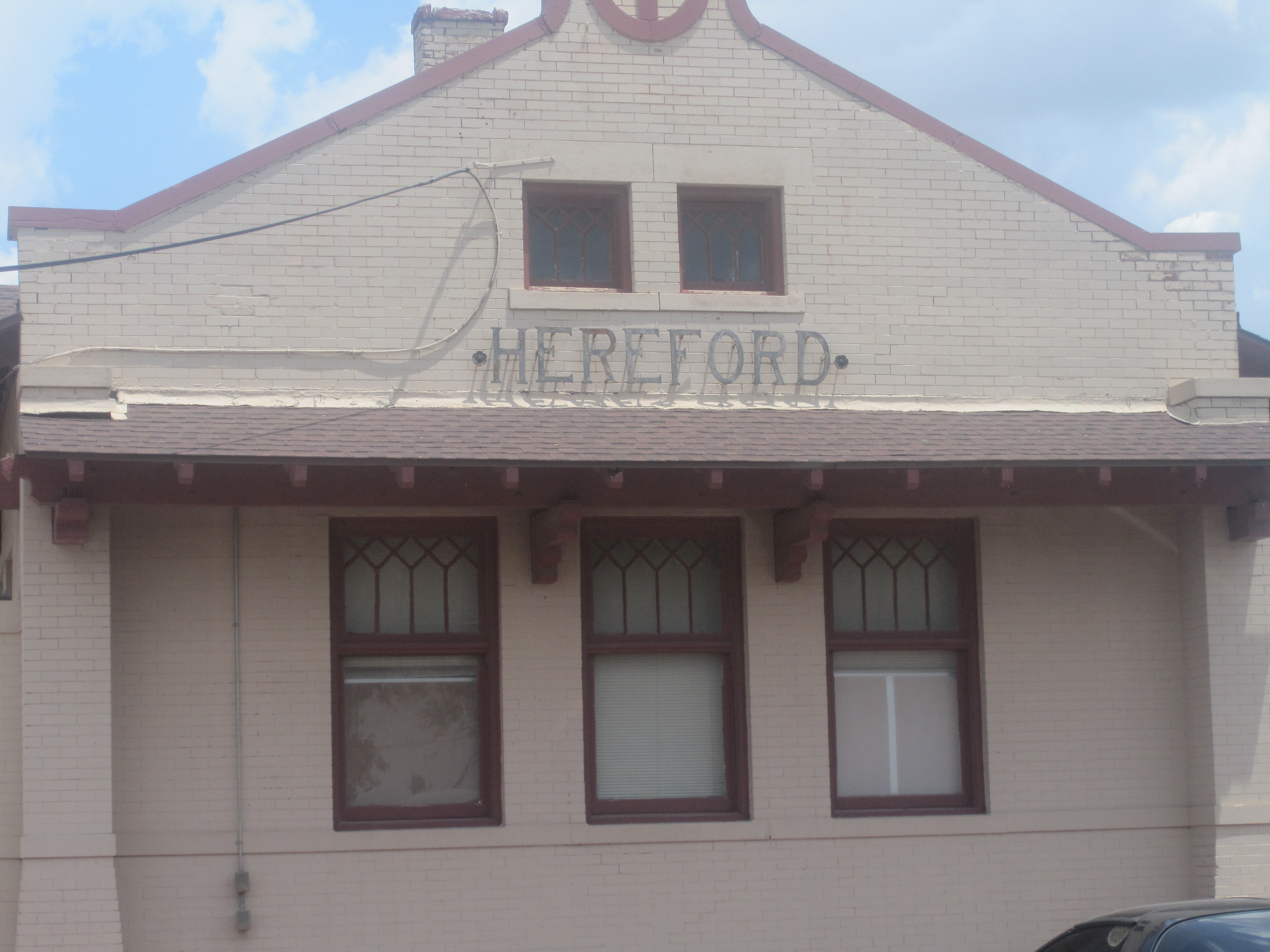
Hereford train depot

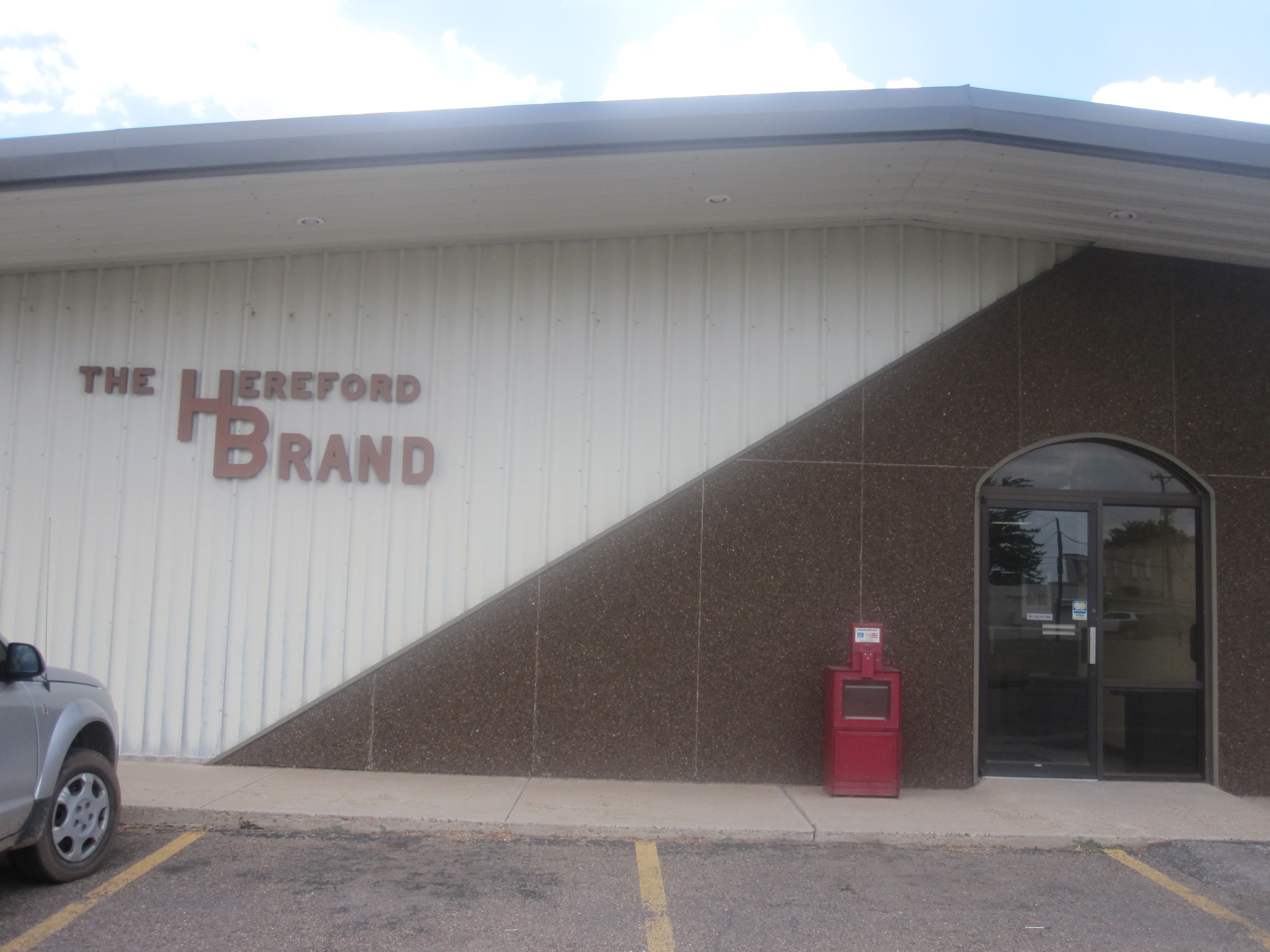
Hereford Brand newspaper office

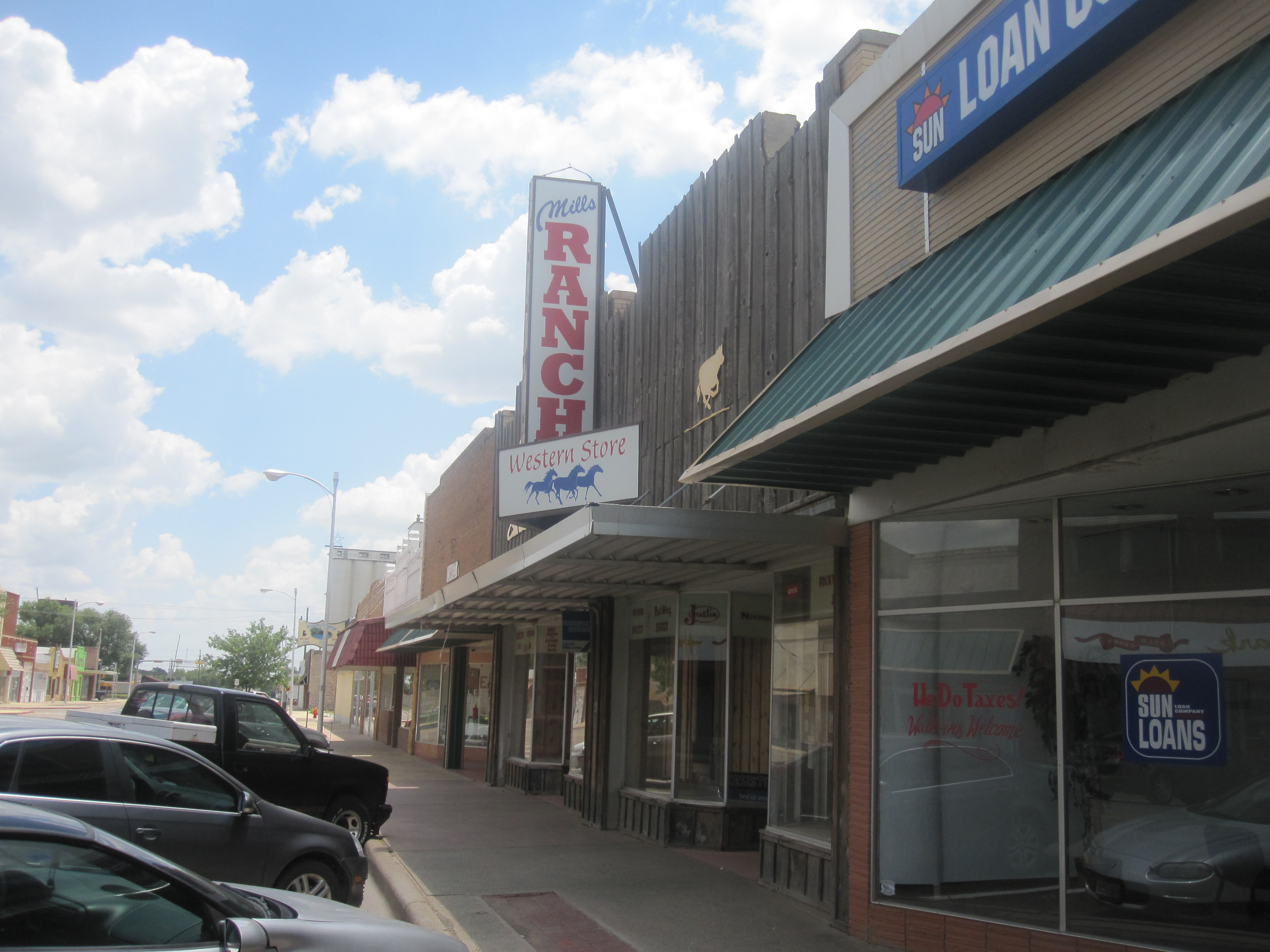
The former Mills Ranch Western Store, once a fixture of downtown Hereford
