= Morse, Texas =

- Census-designated place
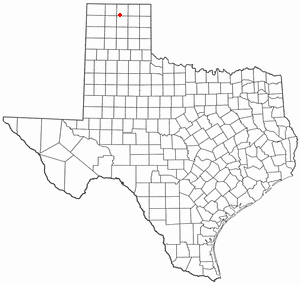
- Location of Morse, Texas

- Coordinates: 36°03′57″N 101°28′37″W
- Country: United States
- State: Texas
- County: Hansford

Area
  - Total: 0.54 sq mi (1.4 km^{2})
  - Land: 0.54 sq mi (1.4 km^{2})
  - Water: 0 sq mi (0.0 km^{2})
- Elevation: 3,199 ft (975 m)

Population (2020)
  - Total: 157
  - Density: 290/sq mi (110/km^{2})
- Time zone: UTC-6 (Central (CST))
  - Summer (DST): UTC-5 (CDT)
- ZIP code: 79062
- Area code: 806
- FIPS code: 48-49440
- GNIS feature ID: 2408871

Morse is an unincorporated community and census-designated place (CDP) in Hansford County, Texas, United States. The population was 157 at the 2020 census.

== Geography ==
Morse is located in southwestern Hansford County. Its southern border is the Hutchinson County line. The community is 0.7 miles (1.1 km) west of Texas State Highway 136, which leads 15 miles (24 km) north to Gruver and 17 miles (27 km) south to Stinnett. Spearman, the Hansford county seat, is 22 miles (35 km) northeast of Morse.

According to the United States Census Bureau, the Morse CDP has a total area of 0.54 square miles (1.4 km^{2}), all land.

== Demographics ==
Historical population
| Census | Pop. | Note | %± |
|---|---|---|---|
| 2000 | 125 | | — |
| 2010 | 147 | | 17.6% |
| 2020 | 157 | | 6.8% |
U.S. Decennial Census; 1850–1900 1910; 1920 1930 1940; 1950 1960 1970; 1980 1990 2000; 2010 2020

Morse first appeared as a census designated place in the 2000 U.S. census.

=== 2020 census ===
Morse CDP, Texas – Racial and ethnic composition Note: the US Census treats Hispanic/Latino as an ethnic category. This table excludes Latinos from the racial categories and assigns them to a separate category. Hispanics/Latinos may be of any race.
| Race / Ethnicity (NH = Non-Hispanic) | Pop 2000 | Pop 2010 | Pop 2020 | % 2000 | % 2010 | % 2020 |
|---|---|---|---|---|---|---|
| White alone (NH) | 134 | 101 | 76 | 77.91% | 68.71% | 48.41% |
| Black or African American alone (NH) | 0 | 1 | 0 | 0.00% | 0.68% | 0.00% |
| Native American or Alaska Native alone (NH) | 0 | 0 | 2 | 0.00% | 0.00% | 1.27% |
| Asian alone (NH) | 0 | 0 | 0 | 0.00% | 0.00% | 0.00% |
| Native Hawaiian or Pacific Islander alone (NH) | 0 | 0 | 0 | 0.00% | 0.00% | 0.00% |
| Other race alone (NH) | 0 | 0 | 2 | 0.00% | 0.00% | 1.27% |
| Mixed race or Multiracial (NH) | 0 | 0 | 0 | 0.00% | 0.00% | 0.00% |
| Hispanic or Latino (any race) | 38 | 45 | 77 | 22.09% | 30.61% | 49.04% |
| Total | 172 | 147 | 157 | 100.00% | 100.00% | 100.00% |

As of the census of 2000, there were 125 people, 61 households, and 45 families residing in the CDP. The population density was 315.6 inhabitants per square mile (121.9/km^{2}). There were 63 housing units at an average density of 115.6 per square mile (44.6/km^{2}). The racial makeup of the CDP was 99.42% White, 0.58% from other races. Hispanic or Latino of any race were 22.09% of the population.

There were 61 households, out of which 45.9% had children under the age of 18 living with them, 67.2% were married couples living together, 3.3% had a female householder with no husband present, and 24.6% were non-families. 24.6% of all households were made up of individuals, and 11.5% had someone living alone who was 65 years of age or older. The average household size was 2.82 and the average family size was 3.37.

In the CDP, the population was spread out, with 32.6% under the age of 18, 9.3% from 18 to 24, 26.7% from 25 to 44, 20.9% from 45 to 64, and 10.5% who were 65 years of age or older. The median age was 36 years. For every 100 females, there were 107.2 males. For every 100 females age 18 and over, there were 107.1 males.

The median income for a household in the CDP was $37,143, and the median income for a family was $40,750. Males had a median income of $21,875 versus $22,000 for females. The per capita income for the CDP was $13,104. There were 8.7% of families and 9.9% of the population living below the poverty line, including 10.4% of under eighteens and 13.3% of those over 64.

== Education ==
Morse is served by the Pringle-Morse Consolidated Independent School District.

The Texas Legislature assigns all of Hansford County to the Borger Junior College District.

== Climate ==
According to the Köppen climate classification, Morse has a semiarid climate, BSk on climate maps.
