= Major Samuel B Cornelius Field Airport =

- IATA: none; ICAO: none; FAA LID: E42

Summary
- Owner/Operator: Hansford County, Texas
- Serves: Spearman, Texas 79081
- Elevation AMSL: 3,090 ft / 941.8 m
- Coordinates: 36.22041°N 101.19493°W

Map

Runways
Direction	Length		Surface
Direction	ft	m	Surface
2/20	5,022	1,530.7	Asphalt
- Sources: AOPA website

Major Samuel B Cornelius Field Airport (FAA LID: E42) is an airport located 1 mile north of Spearman, Texas. The airport was opened in June 1982. The airport normally handles about 20 aircraft every day. The airport was named in honor of Major Samuel B Cornelius, who died in Cambodia in 1973.
