= Texas State Highway 136 =

State highway in Texas

State Highway 136
- SH 136, highlighted in red

Route information
- Maintained by TxDOT
- Length: 108.58 mi (174.74 km)
- Existed: 1929–present

Major junctions
- South end: I-40 BL / US 60 in Amarillo
- North end: SH-136 at the Oklahoma state line north of Gruver

Location
- Country: United States
- State: Texas

Highway system
- Highways in Texas; Interstate; US; State; Former; Toll; Loops; Spurs; FM/RM; Park; Rec
← SH 135	→ SH 137

State Highway 136 (SH 136) is a Texas state highway that runs from the Oklahoma state line south of Guymon, Oklahoma to Amarillo. The route was designated on January 23, 1929 from Amarillo to Oklahoma. On March 19, 1930, the route was truncated to Stinnett, with the portion north of Stinnett transferred to SH 117. On February 4, 1941, the section of SH 136 from the Moore–Potter county line to Stinnett was cancelled. On September 22, 1942, the route was extended east to Borger. The highway was extended to the Oklahoma state line on November 21, 1963, replacing most of FM 278 and all of FM 2216.

== Junction list ==
County	Location	mi	km	Destinations	Notes
Potter	Amarillo	0.0	0.0	I-40 BL / US 60	Southern terminus
Potter	Mayer	3.5	5.6	Loop 335	Interchange
Potter	Mayer	4.1	6.6	FM 1912 (St. Francis Avenue)	
Potter		9.8	15.8	FM 245 east	
Potter		12.2	19.6	FM 293 east – Panhandle	
Potter		16.2	26.1	FM 1342 east	
Moore	No major junctions				
Hutchinson		35.8	57.6	RM 687 north – Sanford, Stinnett, Lake Meredith Natl Rec Area Sanford Yake	
Hutchinson		41.2	66.3	RM 1319 north – Sanford	
Hutchinson	Borger	42.6	68.6	FM 1551 (Fairlanes Boulevard)	
Hutchinson	Borger	43.6	70.2	FM 1559 north	Interchange
Hutchinson	Borger	45.4	73.1	SH 207 south / Wilson Street	Interchange; Southern end of SH 207 concurrency
Hutchinson	Borger	46.0	74.0	SH 152 east (West Third Street) – Skellytown, Pampa	Southern end of SH 152 concurrency
Hutchinson	Borger	47.4	76.3	Spur 140 south (North Main Street) / Spur 245 east (East Carolina Street)	Roundabout
Hutchinson	Borger	47.8	76.9	RM 3474 west	
Hutchinson		49.5	79.7	FM 1559 south	
Hutchinson		55.4	89.2	RM 2277 east	
Hutchinson	Stinnett	57.1	91.9	SH 152 west – Dumas	Northern end of SH 152 concurrency
Hutchinson	Stinnett	57.7	92.9	RM 1526 east (Broadway Street)	
Hutchinson	Stinnett	57.8	93.0	Bus. SH 152 west – Dumas	
Hutchinson		64.1	103.2	SH 207 north – Spearman	Northern end of SH 207 concurrency
Hutchinson	Pringle	66.7	107.3	FM 1598 west	
Hutchinson		71.8	115.6	FM 281 – Sunray	
Hansford		74.5	119.9	FM 1775 west – Morse	
Hansford		79.4	127.8	FM 520 – Spearman	
Hansford		85.5	137.6	FM 2018 – Sunray	
Hansford	Gruver	89.8	144.5	Loop 84 east (4th Street)	
Hansford	Gruver	90.1	145.0	SH 15 east / FM 278 east – Spearman	Southern end of SH 15 concurrency
Hansford	Gruver	90.2	145.2	SH 15 west – Stratford	Northern end of SH 15 concurrency
Hansford		96.3	155.0	FM 2535	
Texas–Oklahoma state line		108.6	174.8	SH-136 – Guymon	
1.000 mi = 1.609 km; 1.000 km = 0.621 mi: Concurrency terminus
