= Texhoma =

Texhoma is the name of twin cities on the border of the Texas and Oklahoma panhandles:

- Texhoma, Texas
- Texhoma, Oklahoma
