= 1924 United States presidential election in Texas =

- November 4, 1924

Nominee	John W. Davis	Calvin Coolidge	Robert M. La Follette
Party	Democratic	Republican	Progressive
Home state	West Virginia	Massachusetts	Wisconsin
Running mate	Charles W. Bryan	Charles G. Dawes	Burton K. Wheeler
Electoral vote	20	0	0
Popular vote	484,605	130,023	42,881
Percentage	73.70%	19.78%	6.52%
County results
Davis
40–50%
50–60%
60–70%
70–80%
80–90%
90–100%
Coolidge
30–40%
40–50%
50–60%
60–70%
La Follette
50–60%
70–80%
President before election
Calvin Coolidge
Republican
Elected President
Calvin Coolidge
Republican

The 1924 United States presidential election in Texas took place on November 4, 1924, as part of the 1924 United States presidential election. State voters chose 20 representatives, or electors, to the Electoral College, who voted for president and vice president.

Ever since statehood, Texas had been very nearly the strongest state for the Democratic Party owing to its initial history being as a Deep South state based around slavery. Even during Reconstruction when African-Americans were briefly enfranchised, the Republican Party won just one statewide election, and after Redemption and the passing of a new constitution in 1876 the GOP became confined largely to areas of abolitionist German refugee settlement in the Hill Country, and to a few South Texas counties where local Republican bosses could until 1920 outcompete their Democratic equivalents. The Terrell Election Law created a poll tax that, from 1902, disenfranchised virtually all remaining African-American voters, the vast majority of Mexican Americans, and also most poor whites. Voter turnout among males over twenty-one fell from over eighty percent to under thirty percent following the poll tax.

The period following this disfranchisement nonetheless saw a considerable amount of typically "Progressive" reform under Governors James Stephen Hogg and Thomas M. Campbell, and despite this progressive faction ceding power in 1906 to the conservatives, Texas proved solid in its support for progressive candidate Woodrow Wilson at the 1912 Democratic National Convention. Another populist, James Ferguson, took the governorship in 1914 on an anti-Prohibition platform, but was impeached for misappropriation of public funds.

1916 had seen Democrat Woodrow Wilson establish firmer control over the machine-dominated areas of South Texas, but hostility towards Wilson's peace promises caused some losses amongst the German population. Later Wilson became hated by German and Irish Americans for his entry into the war, his role in drafting the Treaty of Versailles and supporting many anti-German groups during the "Red Scare". His League of Nations proposal was also opposed in the South where isolationism had long been very powerful, but the reaction was much less pronounced than in Acadiana or the Ozarks.

At the beginning of the campaign, the victory in the tantamount-to-election Democratic primary for Governor of Miriam A. Ferguson in opposition to the powerful Ku Klux Klan produced substantial doubt about whether Democratic nominee John W. Davis of West Virginia would maintain even James M. Cox’s reduced vote share from 1920, with suggestions some of her supporters would back incumbent Republican president Calvin Coolidge or Progressive nominee Robert M. La Follette.

== Results ==
1924 United States presidential election in Texas (Note: Owing to problems with the original collection of returns, these figures differ from those in Géoelections and Edgar Eugene Robinson’s work. These totals exclude some counties (noted in the table) where the Texas Secretary of State did not compile data.)
Party	Candidate	Votes	%
Democratic	John W. Davis	484,605	73.70%
Republican	Calvin Coolidge (incumbent)	130,023	19.78%
Progressive	Robert M. La Follette	42,881	6.52%
Total votes		657,509	100%

=== Results by county ===
County	John W. Davis Democratic		Calvin Coolidge Republican		Robert M. La Follette Progressive		Margin		Total votes cast
County	#	%	#	%	#	%	#	%	Total votes cast
Anderson	374	31.40%	562	47.19%	255	21.41%	-188	-15.79%	1,191
Andrews	60	84.51%	7	9.86%	4	5.63%	53	74.65%	71
Angelina	3,914	88.57%	333	7.54%	172	3.89%	3,581	81.04%	4,419
Aransas	195	70.14%	75	26.98%	8	2.88%	120	43.17%	278
Archer	883	79.05%	146	13.07%	88	7.88%	737	65.98%	1,117
Armstrong	426	76.62%	106	19.06%	24	4.32%	320	57.55%	556
Atascosa	869	62.56%	303	21.81%	217	15.62%	566	40.75%	1,389
Austin	2,601	71.71%	457	12.60%	569	15.69%	2,032 (Note: In this county where Coolidge ran third behind La Follette, margin given is Davis vote minus La Follette vote.)	56.02%	3,627
Bailey	166	66.40%	63	25.20%	21	8.40%	103	41.20%	250
Bandera	425	46.00%	442	47.84%	57	6.17%	-17	-1.84%	924
Bastrop	2,711	78.53%	494	14.31%	247	7.16%	2,217	64.22%	3,452
Baylor	1,012	87.02%	135	11.61%	16	1.38%	877	75.41%	1,163
Bee	897	45.14%	944	47.51%	146	7.35%	-47	-2.37%	1,987
Bell	7,273	76.91%	1,632	17.26%	552	5.84%	5,641	59.65%	9,457
Bexar	10,838	43.88%	9,898	40.07%	3,963	16.05%	940	3.81%	24,699
Blanco	586	54.36%	317	29.41%	175	16.23%	269	24.95%	1,078
Borden	73	42.69%	98	57.31%	0	0.00%	-25	-14.62%	171
Bosque	2,524	83.94%	403	13.40%	80	2.66%	2,121	70.54%	3,007
Bowie	3,455	77.40%	740	16.58%	269	6.03%	2,715	60.82%	4,464
Brazoria	1,761	58.82%	1,114	37.21%	119	3.97%	647	21.61%	2,994
Brazos	2,128	87.07%	255	10.43%	61	2.50%	1,873	76.64%	2,444
Brewster	366	73.20%	113	22.60%	21	4.20%	253	50.60%	500
Briscoe	397	83.40%	53	11.13%	26	5.46%	344	72.27%	476
Brooks	205	76.49%	59	22.01%	4	1.49%	146	54.48%	268
Brown	3,467	87.48%	396	9.99%	100	2.52%	3,071	77.49%	3,963
Burleson	2,496	90.96%	224	8.16%	24	0.87%	2,272	82.80%	2,744
Burnet	1,725	83.74%	277	13.45%	58	2.82%	1,448	70.29%	2,060
Caldwell	2,194	78.44%	399	14.27%	204	7.29%	1,795	64.18%	2,797
Calhoun	686	76.05%	181	20.07%	35	3.88%	505	55.99%	902
Callahan	1,614	82.94%	244	12.54%	88	4.52%	1,370	70.40%	1,946
Cameron	2,225	60.68%	1,266	34.52%	176	4.80%	959	26.15%	3,667
Camp	1,186	83.76%	187	13.21%	43	3.04%	999	70.55%	1,416
Carson	611	64.18%	306	32.14%	35	3.68%	305	32.04%	952
Cass	2,125	66.18%	997	31.05%	89	2.77%	1,128	35.13%	3,211
Castro	219	59.35%	68	18.43%	82	22.22%	137	37.13%	369
Chambers	315	57.80%	219	40.18%	11	2.02%	96	17.61%	545
Cherokee	4,343	85.17%	666	13.06%	90	1.77%	3,677	72.11%	5,099
Childress	1,117	81.77%	178	13.03%	71	5.20%	939	68.74%	1,366
Clay	1,402	76.49%	318	17.35%	113	6.16%	1,084	59.14%	1,833
Cochran	59	81.94%	9	12.50%	4	5.56%	50	69.44%	72
Coke	673	87.86%	80	10.44%	13	1.70%	593	77.42%	766
Coleman	2,763	82.70%	502	15.03%	76	2.27%	2,261	67.67%	3,341
Collin	7,215	77.04%	1,981	21.15%	169	1.80%	5,234	55.89%	9,365
Collingsworth	731	73.99%	234	23.68%	23	2.33%	497	50.30%	988
Colorado	2,105	66.57%	681	21.54%	376	11.89%	1,424	45.03%	3,162
Comal	330	13.39%	312	12.66%	1,823	73.96%	-1,493	-60.57%	2,465
Comanche	376	39.75%	456	48.20%	114	12.05%	-80	-8.46%	946
Concho	668	85.53%	90	11.52%	23	2.94%	578	74.01%	781
Cooke	3,170	77.58%	525	12.85%	391	9.57%	2,645	64.73%	4,086
Coryell	2,890	85.28%	429	12.66%	70	2.07%	2,461	72.62%	3,389
Cottle	580	88.15%	59	8.97%	19	2.89%	521	79.18%	658
Crockett	69	37.91%	112	61.54%	1	0.55%	-43	-23.63%	182
Crosby	1,242	79.92%	278	17.89%	34	2.19%	964	62.03%	1,554
Culberson	93	79.49%	15	12.82%	9	7.69%	78	66.67%	117
Dallam	506	48.42%	254	24.31%	285	27.27%	221	21.15%	1,045
Dallas	30,207	76.99%	8,018	20.43%	1,012	2.58%	22,189	56.55%	39,237
Dawson	1,079	83.06%	185	14.24%	35	2.69%	894	68.82%	1,299
De Witt	2,131	56.21%	868	22.90%	792	20.89%	1,263	33.32%	3,791
Deaf Smith	538	70.51%	192	25.16%	33	4.33%	346	45.35%	763
Delta	2,186	80.49%	479	17.64%	51	1.88%	1,707	62.85%	2,716
Denton	4,708	81.10%	712	12.27%	385	6.63%	3,996	68.84%	5,805
Dickens	849	83.24%	161	15.78%	10	0.98%	688	67.45%	1,020
Dimmit	289	58.62%	180	36.51%	24	4.87%	109	22.11%	493
Donley	893	72.37%	273	22.12%	68	5.51%	620	50.24%	1,234
Duval (Note: Totals for this county are at least partially from the World Almanac and not the official manuscript of returns from the Secretary of State.)	1,290	92.14%	89	6.36%	21	1.50%	1,201	85.79%	1,400
Eastland	4,548	80.04%	972	17.11%	162	2.85%	3,576	62.94%	5,682
Ector	138	89.03%	12	7.74%	5	3.23%	126	81.29%	155
Edwards	204	36.17%	346	61.35%	14	2.48%	-142	-25.18%	564
El Paso	6,220	54.90%	4,078	35.99%	1,032	9.11%	2,142	18.91%	11,330
Ellis	7,678	84.93%	1,220	13.50%	142	1.57%	6,458	71.44%	9,040
Erath	3,396	85.89%	406	10.27%	152	3.84%	2,990	75.62%	3,954
Falls	2,817	81.51%	448	12.96%	191	5.53%	2,369	68.55%	3,456
Fannin	5,596	86.60%	653	10.11%	213	3.30%	4,943	76.49%	6,462
Fayette	3,851	59.66%	1,450	22.46%	1,154	17.88%	2,401	37.20%	6,455
Fisher	1,653	82.12%	302	15.00%	58	2.88%	1,351	67.11%	2,013
Floyd	1,197	85.99%	166	11.93%	29	2.08%	1,031	74.07%	1,392
Foard	585	81.82%	95	13.29%	35	4.90%	490	68.53%	715
Fort Bend	1,690	75.11%	356	15.82%	204	9.07%	1,334	59.29%	2,250
Franklin	1,157	86.60%	118	8.83%	61	4.57%	1,039	77.77%	1,336
Freestone	2,484	78.31%	608	19.17%	80	2.52%	1,876	59.14%	3,172
Frio	637	78.84%	158	19.55%	13	1.61%	479	59.28%	808
Gaines	342	77.55%	37	8.39%	62	14.06%	280	63.49%	441
Galveston	5,068	66.52%	1,912	25.10%	639	8.39%	3,156	41.42%	7,619
Garza	588	62.29%	331	35.06%	25	2.65%	257	27.22%	944
Gillespie	352	13.03%	768	28.42%	1,582	58.55%	-814 (Note: In this county where Davis ran third behind La Follette, margin given is Coolidge vote minus La Follette vote.)	-30.13%	2,702
Glasscock	89	81.65%	14	12.84%	6	5.50%	75	68.81%	109
Goliad	733	54.99%	438	32.86%	162	12.15%	295	22.13%	1,333
Gonzales	2,499	75.96%	463	14.07%	328	9.97%	2,036	61.88%	3,290
Gray	608	51.14%	581	48.86%	0	0.00%	27	2.27%	1,189
Grayson	7,413	71.73%	1,973	19.09%	949	9.18%	5,440	52.64%	10,335
Gregg	1,286	76.96%	177	10.59%	208	12.45%	1,078	64.51%	1,671
Grimes	2,136	91.09%	177	7.55%	32	1.36%	1,959	83.54%	2,345
Guadalupe	831	20.32%	1,657	40.52%	1,601	39.15%	56	1.37%	4,089
Hale	1,446	70.85%	507	24.84%	88	4.31%	939	46.01%	2,041
Hall	1,060	78.34%	229	16.93%	64	4.73%	831	61.42%	1,353
Hamilton	2,035	87.45%	202	8.68%	90	3.87%	1,833	78.77%	2,327
Hansford	263	72.45%	76	20.94%	24	6.61%	187	51.52%	363
Hardeman	1,099	78.05%	256	18.18%	53	3.76%	843	59.87%	1,408
Hardin	1,516	66.55%	645	28.31%	117	5.14%	871	38.24%	2,278
Harris	20,648	63.57%	8,953	27.57%	2,878	8.86%	11,695	36.01%	32,479
Harrison	2,573	78.88%	463	14.19%	226	6.93%	2,110	64.68%	3,262
Hartley	156	64.20%	61	25.10%	26	10.70%	95	39.09%	243
Haskell	2,050	78.66%	428	16.42%	128	4.91%	1,622	62.24%	2,606
Hays	1,616	77.36%	394	18.86%	79	3.78%	1,222	58.50%	2,089
Hemphill	405	62.99%	167	25.97%	71	11.04%	238	37.01%	643
Henderson	3,819	88.73%	405	9.41%	80	1.86%	3,414	79.32%	4,304
Hidalgo	3,662	75.16%	996	20.44%	214	4.39%	2,666	54.72%	4,872
Hill	5,778	86.39%	807	12.07%	103	1.54%	4,971	74.33%	6,688
Hockley	69	73.40%	20	21.28%	5	5.32%	49	52.13%	94
Hood	1,074	85.51%	122	9.71%	60	4.78%	952	75.80%	1,256
Hopkins	4,156	85.97%	557	11.52%	121	2.50%	3,599	74.45%	4,834
Houston	3,289	86.92%	457	12.08%	38	1.00%	2,832	74.84%	3,784
Howard	1,100	76.02%	186	12.85%	161	11.13%	914	63.17%	1,447
Hudspeth	84	59.15%	34	23.94%	24	16.90%	50	35.21%	142
Hunt	6,828	87.43%	836	10.70%	146	1.87%	5,992	76.72%	7,810
Hutchinson	159	67.95%	69	29.49%	6	2.56%	90	38.46%	234
Irion	205	71.18%	73	25.35%	10	3.47%	132	45.83%	288
Jack	1,154	78.50%	290	19.73%	26	1.77%	864	58.78%	1,470
Jackson	758	64.84%	354	30.28%	57	4.88%	404	34.56%	1,169
Jasper	1,526	88.77%	176	10.24%	17	0.99%	1,350	78.53%	1,719
Jeff Davis	117	63.59%	49	26.63%	18	9.78%	68	36.96%	184
Jefferson	5,925	55.09%	4,348	40.42%	483	4.49%	1,577	14.66%	10,756
Jim Hogg	139	87.97%	19	12.03%	0	0.00%	120	75.95%	158
Jim Wells	654	65.93%	213	21.47%	125	12.60%	441	44.46%	992
Johnson	4,600	79.85%	851	14.77%	310	5.38%	3,749	65.08%	5,761
Jones	3,010	81.86%	566	15.39%	101	2.75%	2,444	66.47%	3,677
Karnes	1,727	69.19%	531	21.27%	238	9.54%	1,196	47.92%	2,496
Kaufman	5,573	85.33%	884	13.54%	74	1.13%	4,689	71.80%	6,531
Kendall	136	11.04%	689	55.93%	407	33.04%	282	22.89%	1,232
Kenedy	67	89.33%	7	9.33%	1	1.33%	60	80.00%	75
Kent	386	81.43%	80	16.88%	8	1.69%	306	64.56%	474
Kerr	735	40.63%	892	49.31%	182	10.06%	-157	-8.68%	1,809
Kimble	465	65.77%	223	31.54%	19	2.69%	242	34.23%	707
King	83	95.40%	4	4.60%	0	0.00%	79	90.80%	87
Kinney	144	45.71%	158	50.16%	13	4.13%	-14	-4.44%	315
Kleberg	721	63.52%	206	18.15%	208	18.33%	513	45.20%	1,135
Knox	1,399	72.30%	455	23.51%	81	4.19%	944	48.79%	1,935
La Salle	458	84.66%	73	13.49%	10	1.85%	385	71.16%	541
Lamar	5,224	87.37%	596	9.97%	159	2.66%	4,628	77.40%	5,979
Lamb	356	70.22%	121	23.87%	30	5.92%	235	46.35%	507
Lampasas	1,596	86.46%	228	12.35%	22	1.19%	1,368	74.11%	1,846
Lavaca	3,290	62.42%	746	14.15%	1,235	23.43%	2,055	38.99%	5,271
Lee	1,561	68.35%	271	11.87%	452	19.79%	1,109	48.56%	2,284
Leon	2,004	83.71%	311	12.99%	79	3.30%	1,693	70.72%	2,394
Liberty	1,506	68.80%	639	29.19%	44	2.01%	867	39.61%	2,189
Limestone	4,868	89.58%	523	9.62%	43	0.79%	4,345	79.96%	5,434
Lipscomb	430	45.31%	405	42.68%	114	12.01%	25	2.63%	949
Live Oak	596	57.20%	353	33.88%	93	8.93%	243	23.32%	1,042
Llano	928	86.17%	88	8.17%	61	5.66%	840	77.99%	1,077
Loving	12	85.71%	2	14.29%	0	0.00%	10	71.43%	14
Lubbock	1,710	73.93%	411	17.77%	192	8.30%	1,299	56.16%	2,313
Lynn	1,131	75.35%	313	20.85%	57	3.80%	818	54.50%	1,501
Madison	1,592	91.34%	146	8.38%	5	0.29%	1,446	82.96%	1,743
Marion	620	58.99%	347	33.02%	84	7.99%	273	25.98%	1,051
Martin	327	76.76%	92	21.60%	7	1.64%	235	55.16%	426
Mason	384	53.48%	171	23.82%	163	22.70%	213	29.67%	718
Matagorda	1,353	56.99%	893	37.62%	128	5.39%	460	19.38%	2,374
Maverick	199	40.53%	261	53.16%	31	6.31%	-62	-12.63%	491
McCulloch	1,327	71.96%	495	26.84%	22	1.19%	832	45.12%	1,844
McLennan	7,882	73.52%	2,384	22.24%	455	4.24%	5,498	51.28%	10,721
McMullen	109	48.88%	111	49.78%	3	1.35%	-2	-0.90%	223
Medina	986	43.26%	816	35.81%	477	20.93%	170	7.46%	2,279
Menard	304	52.60%	247	42.73%	27	4.67%	57	9.86%	578
Midland	399	89.26%	44	9.84%	4	0.89%	355	79.42%	447
Milam	5,087	80.31%	930	14.68%	317	5.00%	4,157	65.63%	6,334
Mills	1,289	85.08%	175	11.55%	51	3.37%	1,114	73.53%	1,515
Mitchell	1,242	85.89%	169	11.69%	35	2.42%	1,073	74.20%	1,446
Montague	2,236	68.40%	586	17.93%	447	13.67%	1,650	50.47%	3,269
Montgomery	1,500	88.81%	166	9.83%	23	1.36%	1,334	78.98%	1,689
Moore	82	89.13%	9	9.78%	1	1.09%	73	79.35%	92
Morris	964	81.76%	215	18.24%	0	0.00%	749	63.53%	1,179
Motley	453	86.29%	62	11.81%	10	1.90%	391	74.48%	525
Nacogdoches	3,418	93.16%	204	5.56%	47	1.28%	3,214	87.60%	3,669
Navarro	6,408	85.66%	996	13.31%	77	1.03%	5,412	72.34%	7,481
Newton	782	82.49%	145	15.30%	21	2.22%	637	67.19%	948
Nolan	1,421	77.23%	337	18.32%	82	4.46%	1,084	58.91%	1,840
Nueces	3,214	65.89%	1,537	31.51%	127	2.60%	1,677	34.38%	4,878
Ochiltree	352	62.63%	155	27.58%	55	9.79%	197	35.05%	562
Oldham	187	68.75%	71	26.10%	14	5.15%	116	42.65%	272
Orange	1,385	71.65%	509	26.33%	39	2.02%	876	45.32%	1,933
Palo Pinto	1,926	73.20%	473	17.98%	232	8.82%	1,453	55.23%	2,631
Panola	2,088	93.51%	119	5.33%	26	1.16%	1,969	88.18%	2,233
Parker	2,391	80.26%	438	14.70%	150	5.04%	1,953	65.56%	2,979
Parmer	214	62.76%	91	26.69%	36	10.56%	123	36.07%	341
Pecos	440	66.47%	192	29.00%	30	4.53%	248	37.46%	662
Polk	1,839	85.85%	272	12.70%	31	1.45%	1,567	73.16%	2,142
Potter	2,394	62.82%	831	21.81%	586	15.38%	1,563	41.01%	3,811
Presidio	267	76.72%	68	19.54%	13	3.74%	199	57.18%	348
Rains	899	81.88%	151	13.75%	48	4.37%	748	68.12%	1,098
Randall	627	74.20%	154	18.22%	64	7.57%	473	55.98%	845
Reagan	111	77.08%	31	21.53%	2	1.39%	80	55.56%	144
Real	188	37.75%	300	60.24%	10	2.01%	-112	-22.49%	498
Red River	3,183	89.84%	311	8.78%	49	1.38%	2,872	81.06%	3,543
Reeves	387	75.59%	96	18.75%	29	5.66%	291	56.84%	512
Refugio	585	62.63%	256	27.41%	93	9.96%	329	35.22%	934
Roberts	241	69.45%	104	29.97%	2	0.58%	137	39.48%	347
Robertson	1,487	64.60%	751	32.62%	64	2.78%	736	31.97%	2,302
Rockwall	1,371	93.20%	93	6.32%	7	0.48%	1,278	86.88%	1,471
Runnels	2,564	81.09%	458	14.48%	140	4.43%	2,106	66.60%	3,162
Rusk	3,097	81.18%	651	17.06%	67	1.76%	2,446	64.12%	3,815
Sabine	1,150	94.42%	61	5.01%	7	0.57%	1,089	89.41%	1,218
San Augustine	1,475	94.43%	78	4.99%	9	0.58%	1,397	89.44%	1,562
San Jacinto	585	83.57%	104	14.86%	11	1.57%	481	68.71%	700
San Patricio	1,197	52.89%	987	43.61%	79	3.49%	210	9.28%	2,263
San Saba	1,814	89.94%	187	9.27%	16	0.79%	1,627	80.66%	2,017
Schleicher	246	67.40%	118	32.33%	1	0.27%	128	35.07%	365
Scurry	1,292	80.25%	269	16.71%	49	3.04%	1,023	63.54%	1,610
Shackelford	729	50.07%	727	49.93%	0	0.00%	2	0.14%	1,456
Shelby	3,408	92.16%	160	4.33%	130	3.52%	3,248	87.83%	3,698
Sherman	188	62.67%	87	29.00%	25	8.33%	101	33.67%	300
Smith	4,473	78.16%	1,079	18.85%	171	2.99%	3,394	59.30%	5,723
Somervell	403	85.93%	42	8.96%	24	5.12%	361	76.97%	469
Starr	756	97.05%	23	2.95%	0	0.00%	733	94.09%	779
Stephens	2,184	82.07%	372	13.98%	105	3.95%	1,812	68.09%	2,661
Sterling	243	90.33%	25	9.29%	1	0.37%	218	81.04%	269
Stonewall	778	72.91%	171	16.03%	118	11.06%	607	56.89%	1,067
Sutton	143	53.16%	124	46.10%	2	0.74%	19	7.06%	269
Swisher	573	65.19%	272	30.94%	34	3.87%	301	34.24%	879
Tarrant	13,673	61.73%	5,859	26.45%	2,619	11.82%	7,814	35.28%	22,151
Taylor	3,157	86.26%	441	12.05%	62	1.69%	2,716	74.21%	3,660
Terrell	109	34.49%	122	38.61%	85	26.90%	-13	-4.11%	316
Terry	823	82.22%	160	15.98%	18	1.80%	663	66.23%	1,001
Throckmorton	539	74.97%	174	24.20%	6	0.83%	365	50.76%	719
Titus	1,589	81.70%	348	17.89%	8	0.41%	1,241	63.80%	1,945
Tom Green	2,116	75.73%	554	19.83%	124	4.44%	1,562	55.91%	2,794
Travis	7,573	77.06%	1,909	19.43%	345	3.51%	5,664	57.64%	9,827
Trinity	1,504	88.89%	146	8.63%	42	2.48%	1,358	80.26%	1,692
Tyler	929	88.98%	90	8.62%	25	2.39%	839	80.36%	1,044
Upshur	2,611	89.69%	258	8.86%	42	1.44%	2,353	80.83%	2,911
Upton	35	87.50%	4	10.00%	1	2.50%	31	77.50%	40
Uvalde	1,312	76.50%	351	20.47%	52	3.03%	961	56.03%	1,715
Val Verde	434	43.49%	457	45.79%	107	10.72%	-23	-2.30%	998
Van Zandt	3,957	79.16%	1,038	20.76%	4	0.08%	2,919	58.39%	4,999
Victoria	1,653	68.36%	459	18.98%	306	12.66%	1,194	49.38%	2,418
Walker	1,792	89.78%	201	10.07%	3	0.15%	1,591	79.71%	1,996
Waller	1,239	84.80%	203	13.89%	19	1.30%	1,036	70.91%	1,461
Ward	206	75.18%	42	15.33%	26	9.49%	164	59.85%	274
Washington	3,568	86.25%	496	11.99%	73	1.76%	3,072	74.26%	4,137
Webb	1,313	73.19%	429	23.91%	52	2.90%	884	49.28%	1,794
Wharton	2,020	67.58%	858	28.71%	111	3.71%	1,162	38.88%	2,989
Wheeler	908	78.89%	197	17.12%	46	4.00%	711	61.77%	1,151
Wichita	5,831	68.75%	2,189	25.81%	461	5.44%	3,642	42.94%	8,481
Wilbarger	1,222	77.44%	269	17.05%	87	5.51%	953	60.39%	1,578
Willacy	307	70.74%	110	25.35%	17	3.92%	197	45.39%	434
Williamson	6,324	83.45%	934	12.33%	320	4.22%	5,390	71.13%	7,578
Wilson	1,633	66.54%	495	20.17%	326	13.28%	1,138	46.37%	2,454
Winkler	15	93.75%	1	6.25%	0	0.00%	14	87.50%	16
Wise	2,958	81.24%	532	14.61%	151	4.15%	2,426	66.63%	3,641
Wood	2,806	85.55%	342	10.43%	132	4.02%	2,464	75.12%	3,280
Yoakum	95	84.82%	9	8.04%	8	7.14%	86	76.79%	112
Young	2,000	84.28%	322	13.57%	51	2.15%	1,678	70.71%	2,373
Zapata	300	60.24%	197	39.56%	1	0.20%	103	20.68%	498
Zavala	326	71.96%	95	20.97%	32	7.06%	231	50.99%	453
Totals	484,605	73.70%	130,023	19.78%	42,881	6.52%	355,621	53.92%	675,509

== Analysis ==
Texas had been a Democratic stronghold since it first became a state in 1845, and the first poll taken in early October had Davis winning 56 percent of the vote to 34 percent for Coolidge and 10 percent for La Follette, which constituted a slight decrease on Cox's already reduced majority four years previously. As it turned out, however, the conservative Southern Democrat Davis restored pre-existing Democratic hegemony in most of Texas, improving upon Cox's 1920 vote by fourteen percent and even exceeding Woodrow Wilson’s 1916 performance, whilst Coolidge fell four percent below what Warren G. Harding managed. Although La Follette would carry his home state of Wisconsin and relegate Davis to third in eleven other states, amongst Texas’ poll-tax-restricted electorate his appeal was almost entirely restricted to German Texans who were more culturally allied to the Midwest than to the South. Texas would be La Follette's sixteenth-weakest state nationally, but overwhelmingly German Gillespie and Comal Counties would be the only counties in Southern antebellum slave states to be won by La Follette. In fact, in Comal County La Follette received 73.96 percent of the vote, his highest proportion in any county nationwide. This would be the last time that Texas voted for the losing candidate in a presidential election until 1968.

== See also ==
- United States presidential elections in Texas
