= Jalin Conyers =

American football player (born 2001)

Profile
- Position: Tight end

Personal information
- Born: July 25, 2001 (age 25); Stinnett, Texas, U.S.
- Listed height: 6 ft 4 in (1.93 m)
- Listed weight: 265 lb (120 kg)

Career information
- High school: Gruver (Gruver, Texas)
- College: Oklahoma (2020); Arizona State (2021–2023); Texas Tech (2024)
- NFL draft: 2025: undrafted

Career history
- Miami Dolphins (2025)

Awards and highlights
- Second-team All-Big 12 (2024)
- Stats at Pro Football Reference

Jalin Conyers (born July 25, 2001) is an American professional football tight end. He played college football for the Oklahoma Sooners, Arizona State Sun Devils and Texas Tech Red Raiders.

== Early life ==
Conyers attended Gruver High School in Gruver, Texas. He was rated as a four-star recruit and committed to play college football for the Oklahoma Sooners.

== College career ==
=== Oklahoma ===
Conyers did not play any games for Oklahoma in 2020 and entered his name into the NCAA transfer portal after the season.

=== Arizona State ===
Conyers transferred to play for the Arizona State Sun Devils. In three seasons at Arizona State from 2021 through 2023, he appeared in 34 games primarily as a tight end, where he hauled in 74 receptions for 846 yards and six touchdowns, while also adding 92 yards and a touchdown on the ground, and 20 passing yards. However, Conyers did make two starts at quarterback for the Sun Devils, including a week 11 win over UCLA. After the 2023 season, Conyers entered his name into the NCAA transfer portal.

=== Texas Tech ===
Conyers transferred to play for the Texas Tech Red Raiders. In the 2024 season opener, he caught a touchdown in a win over Abilene Christian. In week four, Conyers rushed for a three-yard touchdown in a win over his former team, Arizona State.

=== Statistics ===
Season	Team	Games			Passing								Rushing				Receiving			
Season	Team	GP	GS	Record (Note: Accounts for only GS as a QB)	Cmp	Att	Pct	Yds	Y/A	TD	Int	Rtg	Att	Yds	Avg	TD	Rec	Yds	Avg	TD
2020	Oklahoma	Redshirt (redshirt)																		
2021	Arizona State	11	1	—	0	0	0.0	0	0.0	0	0	0.0	0	0	0.0	0	6	62	10.3	1
2022	Arizona State	12	1	—	0	0	0.0	0	0.0	0	0	0.0	0	0	0.0	0	38	422	11.1	5
2023	Arizona State	11	5	1–1	5	6	83.3	20	3.3	0	0	111.3	22	92	4.2	1	30	362	12.1	0
2024	Texas Tech	13	3	—	1	1	100.0	20	20.0	1	0	598.0	8	31	3.9	2	30	320	10.7	5
Career		47	10	1–1	6	7	85.7	40	5.7	1	0	180.9	30	123	4.1	3	104	1,166	11.2	11

== Professional career ==
Pre-draft measurables
Height	Weight	Arm length	Hand span	Wingspan	40-yard dash	10-yard split	20-yard split	20-yard shuttle	Three-cone drill	Vertical jump	Broad jump
6 ft 3 1/2 in (1.92 m)	260 lb (118 kg)	33 1/4 in (0.84 m)	9 7/8 in (0.25 m)	6 ft 8 7/8 in (2.05 m)	4.74 s	1.62 s	2.76 s	4.27 s	6.94 s	35.5 in (0.90 m)	10 ft 1 in (3.07 m)
All values from NFL Combine

On May 9, 2025, Conyers signed with the Miami Dolphins as an undrafted free agent after going unselected in the 2025 NFL draft. He was placed on injured reserve on August 4.

On May 21, 2026, Conyers was waived by the Dolphins.
