= Spearman High School =

Location
- 403 East 11th Avenue; Spearman, Texas 79081-4008; United States; 36.184519°N 101.187939°W

Information
- School type: Public high school
- School district: Spearman Independent School District
- Principal: James Layman
- Teaching staff: 22.41 (on an FTE basis)
- Grades: 9-12
- Enrollment: 206 (2023–2024)
- Student to teacher ratio: 9.19
- Colors: Purple, White, Black
- Athletics conference: UIL Class 3A
- Mascot: Lynx
- Website: Spearman ISD Website

Spearman High School is a public high school located in Spearman, Texas (USA) and classified as a 3A school by the UIL. It is part of the Spearman Independent School District located in southeastern Hansford County. In 2015, the school was rated "Met Standard" by the Texas Education Agency.

== Athletics ==
The Spearman Lynx compete in these sports:

- Basketball
- Cross Country
- Football
- Golf
- Swimming
- Tennis
- Track and Field

=== State Titles ===
- Girls Basketball -
  - 1966(2A), 1971(2A), 1972(2A), 1977(2A)
- Girls Cross Country -
  - 1988(2A), 2008(2A), 2009(2A), 2010(2A), 2011(2A)
- Girls Golf -
  - 1975(2A)
- Girls Track -
  - 2000(2A)

==== State Finalist ====
- Girls Basketball -
  - 1961(2A), 1967(2A), 1969(2A), 1970(2A)

== Notable alumni ==
- Brenen Thompson (2022), college football wide receiver for the Mississippi State Bulldogs
