= Sherman County, Texas =

County in Texas, United States

- County
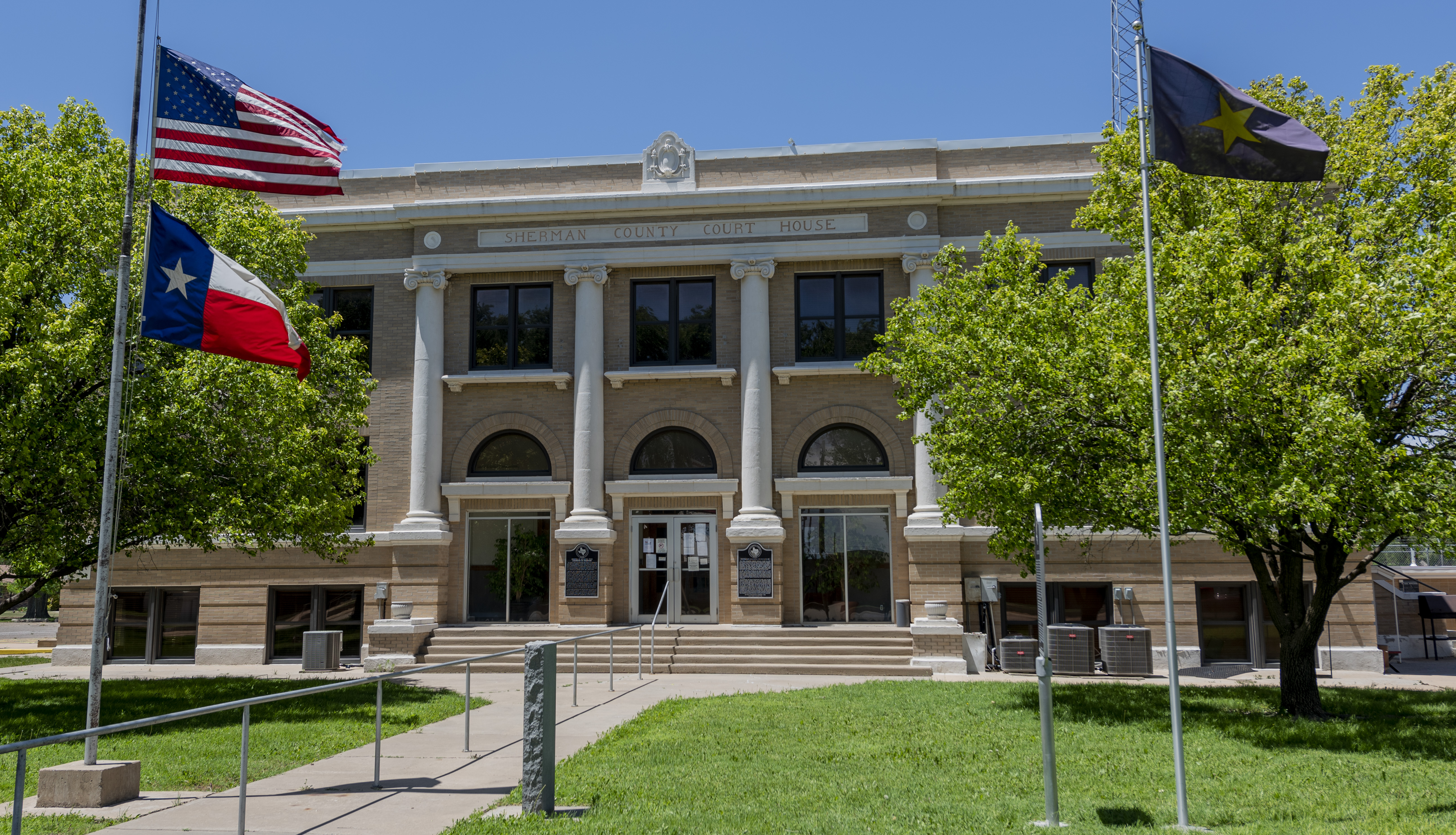
- Sherman County Courthouse

- Location within the U.S. state of Texas
- Coordinates: 36°17′N 101°53′W
- Country: United States
- State: Texas
- Founded: 1889
- Named for: Sidney Sherman
- Seat: Stratford
- Largest city: Stratford

Area
  - Total: 923 sq mi (2,390 km^{2})
  - Land: 923 sq mi (2,390 km^{2})
  - Water: 0.2 sq mi (0.52 km^{2}) 0.02%

Population (2020)
  - Total: 2,782
  - Estimate (2025): 2,781 ▼
  - Density: 3/sq mi (1.2/km^{2})
- Time zone: UTC−6 (Central)
  - Summer (DST): UTC−5 (CDT)
- Congressional district: 13th
- Website: www.shermancountytx.gov

Sherman County is a county located in the U.S. state of Texas. As of the 2020 census, its population was 2,782. Its county seat is Stratford. The county was created in 1876 and organized in 1889. It is named for Sidney Sherman, who fought in the Texas Revolution. Though both Sherman County and Sherman, Texas, are named for the same person, the city of Sherman is located in Grayson County, about 430 miles to the southeast.

== Geography ==
According to the U.S. Census Bureau, the county has a total area of 923 square miles (2,390 km^{2}), of which 0.2 square miles (0.52 km^{2}) (0.02%) is covered by water.

=== Major highways ===
- U.S. Highway 54
- U.S. Highway 287
- State Highway 15

=== Adjacent counties ===
- Texas County, Oklahoma (north)
- Hansford County (east)
- Moore County (south)
- Dallam County (west)
- Cimarron County, Oklahoma (northwest)
- Hartley County (southwest)
- Hutchinson County (southeast)

== Demographics ==
Historical population
Census	Pop.	Note	%±
1890	34		—
1900	104		205.9%
1910	1,476		1,319.2%
1920	1,473		−0.2%
1930	2,314		57.1%
1940	2,026		−12.4%
1950	2,443		20.6%
1960	2,605		6.6%
1970	3,657		40.4%
1980	3,174		−13.2%
1990	2,858		−10.0%
2000	3,186		11.5%
2010	3,034		−4.8%
2020	2,782		−8.3%
2025 (est.)	2,781	▼	0.0%
U.S. Decennial Census; 1850–1900 1910; 1920 1930 1940; 1950 1960 1970; 1980 1990 2000; 2010 2020

=== Racial and ethnic composition ===
Sherman County, Texas – Racial and ethnic composition Note: the US Census treats Hispanic/Latino as an ethnic category. This table excludes Latinos from the racial categories and assigns them to a separate category. Hispanics/Latinos may be of any race.
Race / Ethnicity (NH = Non-Hispanic)	Pop 2000	Pop 2010	Pop 2020	% 2000	% 2010	% 2020
White alone (NH)	2,263	1,762	1,362	71.03%	58.08%	48.96%
Black or African American alone (NH)	15	12	10	0.47%	0.40%	0.36%
Native American or Alaska Native alone (NH)	15	11	5	0.47%	0.36%	0.18%
Asian alone (NH)	1	6	2	0.03%	0.20%	0.07%
Pacific Islander alone (NH)	0	0	0	0.00%	0.00%	0.00%
Other race alone (NH)	0	1	6	0.00%	0.03%	0.22%
Mixed or multiracial (NH)	18	15	82	0.56%	0.49%	2.95%
Hispanic or Latino (any race)	874	1,227	1,315	27.43%	40.44%	47.27%
Total	3,186	3,034	2,782	100.00%	100.00%	100.00%

=== 2020 census ===
As of the 2020 census, the county had a population of 2,782 and a median age of 35.6 years. 29.0% of residents were under the age of 18, and 14.7% of residents were 65 years of age or older. For every 100 females there were 109.5 males, and for every 100 females age 18 and over there were 108.2 males age 18 and over.

The racial makeup of the county was 57.9% White, 0.4% Black or African American, 1.3% American Indian and Alaska Native, 0.1% Asian, <0.1% Native Hawaiian and Pacific Islander, 18.8% from some other race, and 21.4% from two or more races. Hispanic or Latino residents of any race comprised 47.3% of the population.

<0.1% of residents lived in urban areas, while 100.0% lived in rural areas.

There were 990 households in the county, of which 41.1% had children under the age of 18 living in them. Of all households, 58.8% were married-couple households, 17.7% were households with a male householder and no spouse or partner present, and 18.7% were households with a female householder and no spouse or partner present. About 21.2% of all households were made up of individuals and 11.4% had someone living alone who was 65 years of age or older.

There were 1,150 housing units, of which 13.9% were vacant. Among occupied housing units, 73.7% were owner-occupied and 26.3% were renter-occupied. The homeowner vacancy rate was 3.2% and the rental vacancy rate was 16.6%.

=== 2000 census ===
As of the 2000 census, 3,186 people, 1,124 households, and 865 families resided in the county. The population density was 4 people per square mile (1.5 people/km^{2}). The 1,275 housing units averaged 1 units per square mile (0.39 units/km^{2}). The racial makeup of the county was 82.49% White, 0.53% African American, 0.66% Native American, 0.03% Asian, 14.63% from other races, and 1.66% from two or more races. About 27.43% of the population was Hispanic or Latino of any race. In terms of ancestry, 20.3% were German, 7.3% were English, 7.1% were of American, 5.5% were of Irish, 2.6% were of Scottish, and 1.9% were of Dutch.

Of the 1,124 households, 40.7% had children under 18 living with them, 68.0% were married couples living together, 6.0% had a female householder with no husband present, and 23.0% were not families. About 21.5% of all households were made up of individuals, and 10.0% had someone living alone who was 65 or older. The average household size was 2.76 and the average family size was 3.24.

In the county, the age distribution was 31.4% under 18, 7.0% from 18 to 24, 26.5% from 25 to 44, 21.5% from 45 to 64, and 13.6% who were 65 or older. The median age was 34 years. For every 100 females, there were 102.50 males. For every 100 females 18 and over, there were 95.70 males.

The median income for a household in the county was $33,179, and for a family was $38,821. Males had a median income of $27,481 versus $21,036 for females. The per capita income for the county was $17,210. About 11.90% of families and 16.10% of the population were below the poverty line, including 21.90% of those under age 18 and 12.00% of those age 65 or over.

== Communities ==
=== Cities ===
- Stratford (county seat)
- Texhoma (divided city with Texhoma, Oklahoma)

=== Ghost town ===
- Coldwater

== Politics ==
Sherman County is located within District 87 of the Texas House of Representatives. Sherman County is located within District 31 of the Texas Senate.

United States presidential election results for Sherman County, Texas
Year	Republican		Democratic		Third party(ies)	
Year	No.	%	No.	%	No.	%
1912	22	14.47%	96	63.16%	34	22.37%
1916	39	19.31%	152	75.25%	11	5.45%
1920	77	30.68%	170	67.73%	4	1.59%
1924	87	29.00%	188	62.67%	25	8.33%
1928	248	64.42%	137	35.58%	0	0.00%
1932	91	14.94%	515	84.56%	3	0.49%
1936	34	5.65%	568	94.35%	0	0.00%
1940	82	13.38%	528	86.13%	3	0.49%
1944	97	16.61%	454	77.74%	33	5.65%
1948	98	16.55%	479	80.91%	15	2.53%
1952	669	67.71%	317	32.09%	2	0.20%
1956	481	55.35%	383	44.07%	5	0.58%
1960	686	69.08%	305	30.72%	2	0.20%
1964	629	57.60%	462	42.31%	1	0.09%
1968	723	51.79%	297	21.28%	376	26.93%
1972	996	84.34%	169	14.31%	16	1.35%
1976	679	47.95%	718	50.71%	19	1.34%
1980	1,128	77.47%	286	19.64%	42	2.88%
1984	1,269	83.27%	246	16.14%	9	0.59%
1988	1,145	76.38%	340	22.68%	14	0.93%
1992	851	62.16%	261	19.07%	257	18.77%
1996	809	70.78%	243	21.26%	91	7.96%
2000	998	85.81%	144	12.38%	21	1.81%
2004	942	88.37%	124	11.63%	0	0.00%
2008	884	86.67%	127	12.45%	9	0.88%
2012	908	87.48%	121	11.66%	9	0.87%
2016	807	86.31%	96	10.27%	32	3.42%
2020	886	89.31%	91	9.17%	15	1.51%
2024	817	93.59%	48	5.50%	8	0.92%

United States Senate election results for Sherman County, Texas1
Year	Republican		Democratic		Third party(ies)	
Year	No.	%	No.	%	No.	%
2024	8,022	81.92%	1,756	17.93%	14	0.14%

United States Senate election results for Sherman County, Texas2
Year	Republican		Democratic		Third party(ies)	
Year	No.	%	No.	%	No.	%
2020	889	90.07%	88	8.92%	10	1.01%

Texas Gubernatorial election results for Sherman County
Year	Republican		Democratic		Third party(ies)	
Year	No.	%	No.	%	No.	%
2022	665	93.93%	35	4.94%	8	1.13%

== Education ==
School districts include:

- Gruver Independent School District
- Pringle-Morse Consolidated Independent School District
- Stratford Independent School District
- Sunray Independent School District
- Texhoma Independent School District

Residents of Texhoma ISD attend that district's schools and Texhoma Public Schools in Oklahoma for different grade levels.

The Texas Legislature assigns all of Sherman County to the Borger Junior College District.

== Gallery ==
Area affected by 1930s Dust Bowl

== See also ==
- List of museums in the Texas Panhandle
- Dry counties
- Recorded Texas Historic Landmarks in Sherman County
