= K49 =

K49 or K-49 may refer to:

- K-49 (Kansas highway)
- Mass in G major, K. 49, by Wolfgang Amadeus Mozart
- Municipal Airport (Oklahoma), in Texas County, Oklahoma
- Potassium-49, an isotope of potassium
- Shoro Station, in Hokkaido, Japan
