= Gruver High School =

Coordinates: 36.2614°N 101.4005°W

Location
- 601 Garrett Ave. Gruver, Texas 79040-0747; United States

Information
- School type: Public high school
- School district: Gruver Independent School District
- Principal: Nita Hudson
- Staff: 19.65 (on an FTE basis)
- Grades: 9–12
- Enrollment: 151 (2023–2024)
- Student to teacher ratio: 7.68
- Colors: Red & Black
- Athletics conference: UIL Class 2A
- Mascot: Greyhound
- Website: Gruver High School

Gruver High School is a public high school located in Gruver, Texas. It is part of the Gruver Independent School District located in central Hansford County and classified as a 2A school by the UIL.

In the 1990s the school participated in several international exchange programs like World Learning and one of the scholarship owners Bettina Riegel of the Parlamentarisches Patenschaftsprogramm Scholarship for the district Leipzig donated by the American Congress and the German Bundestag of 1997, spent a full school year in GHS. In 2015, the school was rated "Met Standard" by the Texas Education Agency.

== Athletics ==
=== State Titles ===
- Boys Basketball -
  - 1950(B), 1966(1A), 1998(1A)
- Girls Basketball -
  - 2020(2A), 2022(2A)
- Girls Cross Country -
  - 1990(1A), 2009(1A), 2010(1A), 2011(1A), 2026(2A)
- Boys Track -
  - 1986(1A)
- Girls Track -
  - 1972(B)

==== State Finalist ====
- Boys Basketball -
  - 2006(1A)
- Girls Basketball -
  - 2003(1A/D1), 2015(2A), 2023(2A)

== Notable alumni ==
- Jalin Conyers (2020), college football tight end for the Texas Tech Red Raiders
