= Pringle, Texas =

Unincorporated community in Texas, US

Coordinates: 35°56′57″N 101°27′23″W

Pringle is an unincorporated community in northern Hutchinson County, Texas, United States. The Pringle-Morse Consolidated Independent School District serves area students.

== Geography ==
Pringle is at the intersection of State Highway 136 and Farm to Market Road 1598, on the Chicago, Rock Island and Pacific Railroad nine miles north of Stinnett in northern Hutchinson County.

== History ==
The community began in 1929 when the Chicago, Rock Island and Gulf Railroad built between Stinnett and Hitchland. The Pringle post office opened in 1929, and a school was organized that year. William H. Pringle, for whom the community is named, donated land for a school building. By 1933, Pringle had three businesses and a population of twenty. The post office closed circa 1947, and the school was consolidated with the Morse schools in 1977. The population rose to sixty in 1947, dropped to forty-six in 1968, and has been estimated at forty from 1974 to 2000.
