= CCC Ranch Headquarters =

- U.S. National Register of Historic Places
- Location within Oklahoma Location within the United States
- Nearest city: Texhoma, Oklahoma
- Coordinates: 36°44′52″N 101°53′53″W
- Area: less than one acre
- Built: c. 1880
- NRHP reference No.: 83004218
- Added to NRHP: December 1, 1983

The CCC Ranch Headquarters is a historic ranch headquarters in Texhoma, Oklahoma. The headquarters site consists of a ranch house and bunkhouse located along the Beaver River. Built circa 1880, the ranch headquarters served the CCC Ranch, the largest ranch in the Oklahoma Panhandle from 1890 to 1901. The ranch, owned by a group from Tombstone, Arizona, covered 90 square miles (230 km^{2}) from Texhoma to Boise City at its peak. Like the other ranches in the area, the CCC Ranch shrank as homesteaders settled its land; its headquarters are the only intact ranch headquarters in the Panhandle, and the buildings now represent the cowboy era of the American West.
