= 1952 United States presidential election in Texas =

- November 4, 1952

Nominee	Dwight D. Eisenhower	Adlai Stevenson
Party	Republican	Democratic
Home state	New York	Illinois
Running mate	Richard Nixon	John Sparkman
Electoral vote	24	0
Popular vote	1,102,878	969,228
Percentage	53.13%	46.69%
County results
Eisenhower
50–60%
60–70%
70–80%
80–90%
90–100%
Stevenson
50–60%
60–70%
70–80%
80–90%
President before election
Harry S. Truman
Democratic
Elected President
Dwight D. Eisenhower
Republican

The 1952 United States presidential election in Texas was held on November 4, 1952. It was part of the 1952 United States presidential election held throughout all contemporary forty-eight states. Voters chose twenty-four representatives, or electors, to the Electoral College, who voted for president and vice president.

The Republican Party candidate, former General of the Army and Supreme Allied Commander Europe Dwight D. Eisenhower, won his birth state Texas with 53% of the vote against Illinois Governor Adlai Stevenson, carrying the state's 24 electoral votes. Eisenhower had been endorsed by the Texas Democratic Party at their state convention. Despite losing most southern and eastern areas of the state to Stevenson, Eisenhower managed to carry Texas by a margin of 6.44 points. Eisenhower's victory in the state made him only the second Republican to carry the state during a presidential election, the first being Herbert Hoover in 1928, along with being the first presidential candidate to win over a million votes in Texas. Eisenhower nonetheless did lose Grayson County, the home of his birthplace, Denison.

== Results ==
Electoral results
Presidential candidate	Party	Home state	Popular vote		Electoral vote	Running mate		
Presidential candidate	Party	Home state	Count	Percentage	Electoral vote	Vice-presidential candidate	Home state	Electoral vote
Dwight D. Eisenhower	Republican	Pennsylvania	1,102,878	53.13%	24	Richard Nixon	California	24
Adlai Stevenson II	Democrat	Illinois	969,228	46.69%	0	John Sparkman	Alabama	0
Stuart Hamblen	Prohibition	California	1,983	0.10%	0	Enoch A. Holtwick	Illinois	0
Douglas MacArthur	Constitution	District of Columbia	1,563	0.08%	0	Harry F. Byrd	Virginia	0
Vincent Hallinan	Progressive	Washington	294	0.01%	0	Charlotta Bass	California	0
Total			2,075,946	100%	24			24
Needed to win					266			266

=== Results by county ===
County	Dwight D. Eisenhower Republican		Adlai Stevenson Democratic		Various candidates Other parties		Margin		Total votes cast
County	#	%	#	%	#	%	#	%	Total votes cast
Anderson	4,637	57.18%	3,462	42.69%	10	0.12%	1,175	14.49%	8,109
Andrews	805	46.56%	920	53.21%	4	0.23%	-115	-6.65%	1,729
Angelina	4,705	43.00%	6,224	56.88%	13	0.12%	-1,519	-13.88%	10,942
Aransas	818	61.74%	503	37.96%	4	0.30%	315	23.78%	1,325
Archer	937	42.36%	1,272	57.50%	3	0.14%	-335	-15.14%	2,212
Armstrong	562	56.43%	425	42.67%	9	0.90%	137	13.76%	996
Atascosa	2,147	50.15%	2,124	49.61%	10	0.23%	23	0.54%	4,281
Austin	2,964	67.17%	1,445	32.74%	4	0.09%	1,519	34.43%	4,413
Bailey	1,118	51.71%	1,039	48.06%	5	0.23%	79	3.65%	2,162
Bandera	1,350	78.95%	358	20.94%	2	0.12%	992	58.01%	1,710
Bastrop	1,540	32.81%	3,148	67.06%	6	0.13%	-1,608	-34.25%	4,694
Baylor	879	43.43%	1,142	56.42%	3	0.15%	-263	-12.99%	2,024
Bee	2,536	61.46%	1,583	38.37%	7	0.17%	953	23.09%	4,126
Bell	4,862	33.86%	9,484	66.05%	12	0.08%	-4,622	-32.19%	14,358
Bexar	65,391	56.31%	50,260	43.28%	485	0.42%	15,131	13.03%	116,136
Blanco	919	56.80%	697	43.08%	2	0.12%	222	13.72%	1,618
Borden	182	46.43%	210	53.57%	0	0.00%	-28	-7.14%	392
Bosque	1,982	50.45%	1,940	49.38%	7	0.18%	42	1.07%	3,929
Bowie	6,501	38.34%	10,437	61.56%	16	0.09%	-3,936	-23.22%	16,954
Brazoria	8,360	49.88%	8,386	50.03%	15	0.09%	-26	-0.15%	16,761
Brazos	4,681	52.62%	4,213	47.36%	2	0.02%	468	5.26%	8,896
Brewster	1,096	64.28%	609	35.72%	0	0.00%	487	28.56%	1,705
Briscoe	692	57.52%	508	42.23%	3	0.25%	184	15.29%	1,203
Brooks	809	33.89%	1,577	66.07%	1	0.04%	-768	-32.18%	2,387
Brown	4,635	55.02%	3,778	44.85%	11	0.13%	857	10.17%	8,424
Burleson	1,052	30.85%	2,347	68.83%	11	0.32%	-1,295	-37.98%	3,410
Burnet	1,270	46.98%	1,431	52.94%	2	0.07%	-161	-5.96%	2,703
Caldwell	2,052	41.53%	2,887	58.43%	2	0.04%	-835	-16.90%	4,941
Calhoun	1,406	63.28%	813	36.59%	3	0.14%	593	26.69%	2,222
Callahan	1,431	48.71%	1,502	51.12%	5	0.17%	-71	-2.41%	2,938
Cameron	14,018	64.89%	7,559	34.99%	25	0.12%	6,459	29.90%	21,602
Camp	951	38.24%	1,535	61.72%	1	0.04%	-584	-23.48%	2,487
Carson	1,471	57.64%	1,071	41.97%	10	0.39%	400	15.67%	2,552
Cass	2,502	44.17%	3,160	55.78%	3	0.05%	-658	-11.61%	5,665
Castro	1,169	58.57%	825	41.33%	2	0.10%	344	17.24%	1,996
Chambers	1,497	57.20%	1,116	42.64%	4	0.15%	381	14.56%	2,617
Cherokee	3,825	49.63%	3,868	50.19%	14	0.18%	-43	-0.56%	7,707
Childress	1,890	50.12%	1,879	49.83%	2	0.05%	11	0.29%	3,771
Clay	1,272	38.36%	2,044	61.64%	0	0.00%	-772	-23.28%	3,316
Cochran	780	46.07%	906	53.51%	7	0.41%	-126	-7.44%	1,693
Coke	576	43.74%	736	55.88%	5	0.38%	-160	-12.14%	1,317
Coleman	2,555	58.24%	1,824	41.58%	8	0.18%	731	16.66%	4,387
Collin	4,037	40.57%	5,906	59.36%	7	0.07%	-1,869	-18.79%	9,950
Collingsworth	1,334	50.21%	1,321	49.72%	2	0.08%	13	0.49%	2,657
Colorado	3,237	61.19%	2,043	38.62%	10	0.19%	1,194	22.57%	5,290
Comal	3,350	72.73%	1,252	27.18%	4	0.09%	2,098	45.55%	4,606
Comanche	2,411	52.46%	2,181	47.45%	4	0.09%	230	5.01%	4,596
Concho	808	53.30%	708	46.70%	0	0.00%	100	6.60%	1,516
Cooke	4,385	62.20%	2,657	37.69%	8	0.11%	1,728	24.51%	7,050
Coryell	1,658	40.52%	2,432	59.43%	2	0.05%	-774	-18.91%	4,092
Cottle	494	26.53%	1,368	73.47%	0	0.00%	-874	-46.94%	1,862
Crane	621	41.73%	857	57.59%	10	0.67%	-236	-15.86%	1,488
Crockett	654	68.13%	306	31.88%	0	0.00%	348	36.25%	960
Crosby	1,053	40.45%	1,550	59.55%	0	0.00%	-497	-19.10%	2,603
Culberson	331	56.78%	252	43.22%	0	0.00%	79	13.56%	583
Dallam	1,464	54.77%	1,197	44.78%	12	0.45%	267	9.99%	2,673
Dallas	118,218	62.73%	69,394	36.82%	850	0.45%	48,824	25.91%	188,462
Dawson	2,388	53.29%	2,093	46.71%	0	0.00%	295	6.58%	4,481
Deaf Smith	2,468	70.86%	1,006	28.88%	9	0.26%	1,462	41.98%	3,483
Delta	707	30.81%	1,585	69.06%	3	0.13%	-878	-38.25%	2,295
Denton	5,840	52.44%	5,289	47.49%	8	0.07%	551	4.95%	11,137
DeWitt	4,075	67.71%	1,934	32.14%	9	0.15%	2,141	35.57%	6,018
Dickens	782	38.43%	1,249	61.38%	4	0.20%	-467	-22.95%	2,035
Dimmit	954	65.34%	503	34.45%	3	0.21%	451	30.89%	1,460
Donley	1,150	55.93%	900	43.77%	6	0.29%	250	12.16%	2,056
Duval	672	16.85%	3,316	83.13%	1	0.03%	-2,644	-66.28%	3,989
Eastland	4,518	57.15%	3,370	42.63%	18	0.23%	1,148	14.52%	7,906
Ector	8,259	61.01%	5,270	38.93%	8	0.06%	2,989	22.08%	13,537
Edwards	586	73.43%	210	26.32%	2	0.25%	376	47.11%	798
Ellis	4,183	39.91%	6,275	59.86%	24	0.23%	-2,092	-19.95%	10,482
El Paso	20,005	57.74%	14,595	42.12%	47	0.14%	5,410	15.62%	34,647
Erath	3,249	54.93%	2,664	45.04%	2	0.03%	585	9.89%	5,915
Falls	1,962	37.32%	3,287	62.53%	8	0.15%	-1,325	-25.21%	5,257
Fannin	2,099	28.12%	5,363	71.84%	3	0.04%	-3,264	-43.72%	7,465
Fayette	4,240	62.35%	2,557	37.60%	3	0.04%	1,683	24.75%	6,800
Fisher	952	40.36%	1,405	59.56%	2	0.08%	-453	-19.20%	2,359
Floyd	2,066	58.46%	1,463	41.40%	5	0.14%	603	17.06%	3,534
Foard	418	33.28%	830	66.08%	8	0.64%	-412	-32.80%	1,256
Fort Bend	3,974	55.00%	3,241	44.85%	11	0.15%	733	10.15%	7,226
Franklin	564	29.33%	1,358	70.62%	1	0.05%	-794	-41.29%	1,923
Freestone	1,707	37.02%	2,902	62.94%	2	0.04%	-1,195	-25.92%	4,611
Frio	1,011	50.52%	983	49.13%	7	0.35%	28	1.39%	2,001
Gaines	1,350	46.47%	1,540	53.01%	15	0.52%	-190	-6.54%	2,905
Galveston	15,715	45.00%	19,058	54.58%	147	0.42%	-3,343	-9.58%	34,920
Garza	742	48.15%	797	51.72%	2	0.13%	-55	-3.57%	1,541
Gillespie	3,687	92.29%	300	7.51%	8	0.20%	3,387	84.78%	3,995
Glasscock	235	54.40%	197	45.60%	0	0.00%	38	8.80%	432
Goliad	1,065	70.16%	452	29.78%	1	0.07%	613	40.38%	1,518
Gonzales	2,249	46.71%	2,563	53.23%	3	0.06%	-314	-6.52%	4,815
Gray	5,467	61.73%	3,367	38.02%	23	0.26%	2,100	23.71%	8,857
Grayson	7,736	42.52%	10,435	57.35%	23	0.13%	-2,699	-14.83%	18,194
Gregg	10,583	56.31%	7,969	42.40%	242	1.29%	2,614	13.91%	18,794
Grimes	1,557	53.32%	1,362	46.64%	1	0.03%	195	6.68%	2,920
Guadalupe	4,396	65.22%	2,330	34.57%	14	0.21%	2,066	30.65%	6,740
Hale	4,858	59.06%	3,351	40.74%	17	0.21%	1,507	18.32%	8,226
Hall	1,253	41.78%	1,744	58.15%	2	0.07%	-491	-16.37%	2,999
Hamilton	2,130	61.77%	1,313	38.08%	5	0.15%	817	23.69%	3,448
Hansford	1,234	72.93%	456	26.95%	2	0.12%	778	45.98%	1,692
Hardeman	1,571	55.69%	1,242	44.03%	8	0.28%	329	11.66%	2,821
Hardin	1,653	32.53%	3,423	67.36%	6	0.12%	-1,770	-34.83%	5,082
Harris	146,665	57.63%	107,604	42.28%	228	0.09%	39,061	15.35%	254,497
Harrison	4,708	51.01%	4,516	48.93%	5	0.05%	192	2.08%	9,229
Hartley	468	53.55%	402	46.00%	4	0.46%	66	7.55%	874
Haskell	1,290	34.15%	2,481	65.69%	6	0.16%	-1,191	-31.54%	3,777
Hays	2,135	50.74%	2,070	49.19%	3	0.07%	65	1.55%	4,208
Hemphill	892	60.19%	590	39.81%	0	0.00%	302	20.38%	1,482
Henderson	2,534	36.33%	4,439	63.65%	1	0.01%	-1,905	-27.32%	6,974
Hidalgo	15,303	62.20%	9,251	37.60%	48	0.20%	6,052	24.60%	24,602
Hill	3,242	41.85%	4,504	58.14%	1	0.01%	-1,262	-16.29%	7,747
Hockley	2,651	47.17%	2,962	52.70%	7	0.12%	-311	-5.53%	5,620
Hood	780	36.52%	1,356	63.48%	0	0.00%	-576	-26.96%	2,136
Hopkins	2,460	39.56%	3,750	60.31%	8	0.13%	-1,290	-20.75%	6,218
Houston	2,222	43.35%	2,900	56.57%	4	0.08%	-678	-13.22%	5,126
Howard	3,412	41.60%	4,779	58.27%	11	0.13%	-1,367	-16.67%	8,202
Hudspeth	355	57.07%	262	42.12%	5	0.80%	93	14.95%	622
Hunt	5,614	53.06%	4,953	46.81%	14	0.13%	661	6.25%	10,581
Hutchinson	5,369	51.30%	5,083	48.57%	13	0.12%	286	2.73%	10,465
Irion	268	48.73%	282	51.27%	0	0.00%	-14	-2.54%	550
Jack	1,406	55.38%	1,130	44.51%	3	0.12%	276	10.87%	2,539
Jackson	2,113	57.14%	1,584	42.83%	1	0.03%	529	14.31%	3,698
Jasper	1,946	42.84%	2,595	57.12%	2	0.04%	-649	-14.28%	4,543
Jeff Davis	306	62.58%	183	37.42%	0	0.00%	123	25.16%	489
Jefferson	25,363	46.29%	29,384	53.63%	48	0.09%	-4,021	-7.34%	54,795
Jim Hogg	309	22.69%	1,053	77.31%	0	0.00%	-744	-54.62%	1,362
Jim Wells	3,592	48.94%	3,745	51.03%	2	0.03%	-153	-2.09%	7,339
Johnson	3,985	46.97%	4,496	52.99%	4	0.05%	-511	-6.02%	8,485
Jones	2,941	52.21%	2,680	47.58%	12	0.21%	261	4.63%	5,633
Karnes	2,374	55.73%	1,884	44.23%	2	0.05%	490	11.50%	4,260
Kaufman	2,964	44.05%	3,762	55.91%	3	0.04%	-798	-11.86%	6,729
Kendall	1,786	82.53%	370	17.10%	8	0.37%	1,416	65.43%	2,164
Kenedy	108	88.52%	14	11.48%	0	0.00%	94	77.04%	122
Kent	259	32.95%	526	66.92%	1	0.13%	-267	-33.97%	786
Kerr	3,683	73.24%	1,337	26.59%	9	0.18%	2,346	46.65%	5,029
Kimble	1,077	67.10%	525	32.71%	3	0.19%	552	34.39%	1,605
King	66	25.88%	189	74.12%	0	0.00%	-123	-48.24%	255
Kinney	384	55.65%	306	44.35%	0	0.00%	78	11.30%	690
Kleberg	2,037	38.94%	3,193	61.04%	1	0.02%	-1,156	-22.10%	5,231
Knox	1,033	39.88%	1,556	60.08%	1	0.04%	-523	-20.20%	2,590
Lamar	3,929	41.56%	5,524	58.44%	0	0.00%	-1,595	-16.88%	9,453
Lamb	2,913	51.36%	2,748	48.45%	11	0.19%	165	2.91%	5,672
Lampasas	1,478	55.21%	1,199	44.79%	0	0.00%	279	10.42%	2,677
La Salle	565	40.88%	816	59.04%	1	0.07%	-251	-18.16%	1,382
Lavaca	3,599	56.58%	2,750	43.23%	12	0.19%	849	13.35%	6,361
Lee	1,316	48.61%	1,389	51.31%	2	0.07%	-73	-2.70%	2,707
Leon	1,266	40.66%	1,842	59.15%	6	0.19%	-576	-18.49%	3,114
Liberty	4,106	53.01%	3,632	46.89%	8	0.10%	474	6.12%	7,746
Limestone	2,485	37.50%	4,132	62.35%	10	0.15%	-1,647	-24.85%	6,627
Lipscomb	1,174	85.13%	204	14.79%	1	0.07%	970	70.34%	1,379
Live Oak	1,443	71.22%	573	28.28%	10	0.49%	870	42.94%	2,026
Llano	840	43.21%	1,102	56.69%	2	0.10%	-262	-13.48%	1,944
Loving	71	74.74%	24	25.26%	0	0.00%	47	49.48%	95
Lubbock	16,137	57.95%	11,650	41.84%	58	0.21%	4,487	16.11%	27,845
Lynn	1,351	43.29%	1,762	56.46%	8	0.26%	-411	-13.17%	3,121
McCulloch	1,788	52.28%	1,623	47.46%	9	0.26%	165	4.82%	3,420
McLennan	14,974	46.39%	17,251	53.45%	53	0.16%	-2,277	-7.06%	32,278
McMullen	290	64.88%	156	34.90%	1	0.22%	134	29.98%	447
Madison	692	37.53%	1,152	62.47%	0	0.00%	-460	-24.94%	1,844
Marion	877	47.43%	970	52.46%	2	0.11%	-93	-5.03%	1,849
Martin	562	37.07%	952	62.80%	2	0.13%	-390	-25.73%	1,516
Mason	1,069	63.71%	606	36.11%	3	0.18%	463	27.60%	1,678
Matagorda	4,122	66.23%	2,101	33.76%	1	0.02%	2,021	32.47%	6,224
Maverick	839	46.56%	962	53.39%	1	0.06%	-123	-6.83%	1,802
Medina	3,204	63.52%	1,840	36.48%	0	0.00%	1,364	27.04%	5,044
Menard	843	67.87%	399	32.13%	0	0.00%	444	35.74%	1,242
Midland	7,956	71.04%	3,244	28.96%	0	0.00%	4,712	42.08%	11,200
Milam	2,539	43.94%	3,227	55.85%	12	0.21%	-688	-11.91%	5,778
Mills	1,089	55.39%	875	44.51%	2	0.10%	214	10.88%	1,966
Mitchell	1,417	40.95%	2,031	58.70%	12	0.35%	-614	-17.75%	3,460
Montague	2,367	43.97%	3,012	55.95%	4	0.07%	-645	-11.98%	5,383
Montgomery	2,969	46.32%	3,432	53.54%	9	0.14%	-463	-7.22%	6,410
Moore	1,909	47.31%	2,114	52.39%	12	0.30%	-205	-5.08%	4,035
Morris	890	34.06%	1,722	65.90%	1	0.04%	-832	-31.84%	2,613
Motley	675	56.72%	513	43.11%	2	0.17%	162	13.61%	1,190
Nacogdoches	2,891	44.84%	3,556	55.16%	0	0.00%	-665	-10.32%	6,447
Navarro	3,592	29.10%	8,745	70.84%	8	0.06%	-5,153	-41.74%	12,345
Newton	917	35.99%	1,630	63.97%	1	0.04%	-713	-27.98%	2,548
Nolan	2,907	48.11%	3,123	51.68%	13	0.22%	-216	-3.57%	6,043
Nueces	19,124	48.59%	20,156	51.21%	79	0.20%	-1,032	-2.62%	39,359
Ochiltree	1,755	80.39%	426	19.51%	2	0.09%	1,329	60.88%	2,183
Oldham	341	54.65%	280	44.87%	3	0.48%	61	9.78%	624
Orange	4,491	41.15%	6,403	58.67%	19	0.17%	-1,912	-17.52%	10,913
Palo Pinto	3,029	51.19%	2,876	48.61%	12	0.20%	153	2.58%	5,917
Panola	2,080	41.75%	2,897	58.15%	5	0.10%	-817	-16.40%	4,982
Parker	3,523	50.50%	3,434	49.23%	19	0.27%	89	1.27%	6,976
Parmer	1,503	69.39%	663	30.61%	0	0.00%	840	38.78%	2,166
Pecos	1,573	59.36%	1,076	40.60%	1	0.04%	497	18.76%	2,650
Polk	1,454	39.36%	2,238	60.58%	2	0.05%	-784	-21.22%	3,694
Potter	14,931	61.62%	9,259	38.21%	42	0.17%	5,672	23.41%	24,232
Presidio	770	55.36%	621	44.64%	0	0.00%	149	10.72%	1,391
Rains	500	45.96%	588	54.04%	0	0.00%	-88	-8.08%	1,088
Randall	4,305	69.28%	1,905	30.66%	4	0.06%	2,400	38.62%	6,214
Reagan	533	53.62%	460	46.28%	1	0.10%	73	7.34%	994
Real	450	59.76%	303	40.24%	0	0.00%	147	19.52%	753
Red River	1,964	36.04%	3,484	63.93%	2	0.04%	-1,520	-27.89%	5,450
Reeves	1,727	55.39%	1,385	44.42%	6	0.19%	342	10.97%	3,118
Refugio	1,427	50.39%	1,401	49.47%	4	0.14%	26	0.92%	2,832
Roberts	379	80.64%	91	19.36%	0	0.00%	288	61.28%	470
Robertson	1,378	34.39%	2,626	65.54%	3	0.07%	-1,248	-31.15%	4,007
Rockwall	602	33.73%	1,175	65.83%	8	0.45%	-573	-32.10%	1,785
Runnels	2,622	58.53%	1,853	41.36%	5	0.11%	769	17.17%	4,480
Rusk	5,634	49.68%	5,694	50.21%	12	0.11%	-60	-0.53%	11,340
Sabine	729	31.67%	1,573	68.33%	0	0.00%	-844	-36.66%	2,302
San Augustine	730	34.94%	1,359	65.06%	0	0.00%	-629	-30.12%	2,089
San Jacinto	494	32.06%	1,043	67.68%	4	0.26%	-549	-35.62%	1,541
San Patricio	3,220	49.24%	3,315	50.69%	5	0.08%	-95	-1.45%	6,540
San Saba	900	33.92%	1,752	66.04%	1	0.04%	-852	-32.12%	2,653
Schleicher	628	59.87%	421	40.13%	0	0.00%	207	19.74%	1,049
Scurry	2,620	51.37%	2,480	48.63%	0	0.00%	140	2.74%	5,100
Shackelford	1,057	57.54%	776	42.24%	4	0.22%	281	15.30%	1,837
Shelby	1,792	29.63%	4,249	70.27%	6	0.10%	-2,457	-40.64%	6,047
Sherman	669	67.71%	317	32.09%	2	0.20%	352	35.62%	988
Smith	10,947	56.40%	8,450	43.53%	13	0.07%	2,497	12.87%	19,410
Somervell	494	51.84%	450	47.22%	9	0.94%	44	4.62%	953
Starr	620	16.87%	3,055	83.13%	0	0.00%	-2,435	-66.26%	3,675
Stephens	2,272	60.64%	1,471	39.26%	4	0.11%	801	21.38%	3,747
Sterling	277	63.68%	158	36.32%	0	0.00%	119	27.36%	435
Stonewall	319	27.57%	836	72.26%	2	0.17%	-517	-44.69%	1,157
Sutton	581	62.34%	351	37.66%	0	0.00%	230	24.68%	932
Swisher	1,843	63.07%	1,074	36.76%	5	0.17%	769	26.31%	2,922
Tarrant	63,680	57.97%	45,968	41.85%	194	0.18%	17,712	16.12%	109,842
Taylor	10,260	56.22%	7,936	43.48%	55	0.30%	2,324	12.74%	18,251
Terrell	426	59.00%	295	40.86%	1	0.14%	131	18.14%	722
Terry	1,823	46.37%	2,105	53.55%	3	0.08%	-282	-7.18%	3,931
Throckmorton	586	44.60%	728	55.40%	0	0.00%	-142	-10.80%	1,314
Titus	1,887	37.51%	3,142	62.45%	2	0.04%	-1,255	-24.94%	5,031
Tom Green	9,698	62.49%	5,797	37.35%	24	0.15%	3,901	25.14%	15,519
Travis	20,850	52.06%	19,155	47.83%	46	0.11%	1,695	4.23%	40,051
Trinity	958	35.71%	1,725	64.29%	0	0.00%	-767	-28.58%	2,683
Tyler	1,466	52.92%	1,304	47.08%	0	0.00%	162	5.84%	2,770
Upshur	2,391	43.98%	3,040	55.91%	6	0.11%	-649	-11.93%	5,437
Upton	940	52.43%	850	47.41%	3	0.17%	90	5.02%	1,793
Uvalde	2,805	69.36%	1,230	30.42%	9	0.22%	1,575	38.94%	4,044
Val Verde	1,725	51.14%	1,647	48.83%	1	0.03%	78	2.31%	3,373
Van Zandt	2,279	36.74%	3,911	63.05%	13	0.21%	-1,632	-26.31%	6,203
Victoria	4,306	57.89%	3,128	42.05%	4	0.05%	1,178	15.84%	7,438
Walker	1,897	47.71%	2,078	52.26%	1	0.03%	-181	-4.55%	3,976
Waller	1,487	54.01%	1,264	45.91%	2	0.07%	223	8.10%	2,753
Ward	1,994	51.98%	1,840	47.97%	2	0.05%	154	4.01%	3,836
Washington	3,519	72.17%	1,354	27.77%	3	0.06%	2,165	44.40%	4,876
Webb	2,784	30.95%	6,208	69.01%	4	0.04%	-3,424	-38.06%	8,996
Wharton	5,232	56.51%	4,022	43.44%	5	0.05%	1,210	13.07%	9,259
Wheeler	1,645	51.37%	1,551	48.44%	6	0.19%	94	2.93%	3,202
Wichita	12,197	47.40%	13,505	52.49%	29	0.11%	-1,308	-5.09%	25,731
Wilbarger	3,019	53.28%	2,646	46.70%	1	0.02%	373	6.58%	5,666
Willacy	2,244	62.79%	1,324	37.05%	6	0.17%	920	25.74%	3,574
Williamson	3,646	42.09%	5,010	57.83%	7	0.08%	-1,364	-15.74%	8,663
Wilson	1,823	45.40%	2,187	54.47%	5	0.12%	-364	-9.07%	4,015
Winkler	1,550	50.59%	1,508	49.22%	6	0.20%	42	1.37%	3,064
Wise	2,309	42.49%	3,121	57.43%	4	0.07%	-812	-14.94%	5,434
Wood	2,748	47.54%	3,026	52.35%	6	0.10%	-278	-4.81%	5,780
Yoakum	858	49.51%	873	50.38%	2	0.12%	-15	-0.87%	1,733
Young	2,649	51.02%	2,536	48.84%	7	0.13%	113	2.18%	5,192
Zapata	526	46.02%	616	53.89%	1	0.09%	-90	-7.87%	1,143
Zavala	1,043	60.53%	677	39.29%	3	0.17%	366	21.24%	1,723
Totals	1,102,878	53.13%	969,228	46.69%	3,840	0.18%	133,650	6.44%	2,075,946

==== Counties that flipped from Democratic to Republican ====
- Anderson
- Aransas
- Armstrong
- Armstrong
- Atascosa
- Bailey
- Bee
- Bexar
- Blanco
- Bosque
- Brewster
- Briscoe
- Brown
- Brazos
- Calhoun
- Cameron
- Castro
- Carson
- Chambers
- Childress
- Coleman
- Collingsworth
- Comanche
- Colorado
- Concho
- Crockett
- Cooke
- Culberson
- Dallam
- Dallas
- Dawson
- Denton
- Deaf Smith
- DeWitt
- Dimmit
- Donley
- Eastland
- Ector
- Edwards
- El Paso
- Erath
- Fayette
- Floyd
- Fort Bend
- Frio
- Glasscock
- Goliad
- Gregg
- Gray
- Grimes
- Hale
- Hamilton
- Hansford
- Hardeman
- Harris
- Hays
- Harrison
- Hartley
- Hemphill
- Hidalgo
- Hutchinson
- Hudspeth
- Hunt
- Jack
- Jackson
- Jeff Davis
- Karnes
- Kenedy
- Kimble
- Lamb
- Kinney
- Lampasas
- Lavaca
- Liberty
- Lipscomb
- Live Oak
- McCulloch
- Loving
- Lubbock
- Mason
- McMullen
- Matagorda
- Midland
- Medina
- Mills
- Menard
- Motley
- Ochiltree
- Oldham
- Palo Pinto
- Parker
- Parmer
- Pecos
- Presidio
- Potter
- Randall
- Reagan
- Real
- Reeves
- Refugio
- Roberts
- Runnels
- Scurry
- Shackelford
- Schleicher
- Sherman
- Smith
- Somervell
- Stephens
- Sterling
- Sutton
- Swisher
- Tarrant
- Taylor
- Terrell
- Tom Green
- Travis
- Tyler
- Val Verde
- Upton
- Uvalde
- Victoria
- Ward
- Waller
- Wheeler
- Wharton
- Wilbarger
- Willacy
- Winkler
- Zavala
- Young

== See also ==
- United States presidential elections in Texas
