= Texhoma Independent School District =

School district in Texas

Location
- Texhoma, TX ESC Region 16 USA

District information
- Type: Public
- Grades: K through 4
- Superintendent: Steve Lenz

Students and staff
- Students: 374
- Teachers: 17

Other information
- Website: Texhoma ISD

Texhoma Independent School District is a public school district based in Texhoma, Texas (USA).

Located in Sherman County, the district extends into a small portion of Hansford County.

The district operates one school serving grades K-4. Due to its isolated location on the border of the Texas Panhandle and the Oklahoma Panhandle, the district operates under an arrangement with Texhoma Public Schools, a public school district located in adjacent Texhoma, Oklahoma. All students residing in Texhoma ISD and Texhoma Public Schools attend school in Texhoma ISD for grades K-4, then attend school in Texhoma Public Schools for grades 5–12. As a result, the district also educates students in the portion of Texas County, Oklahoma which is within Texhoma Public Schools. As such, graduating students can attend public universities in either Oklahoma or Texas and be eligible for in-state tuition in either state.

The districts have separate curricula, boards of education, and taxation systems. They share sports teams. The two districts charge each other for tuition. Students of the two districts learn about the history of each state.

== History ==
The Texas Legislature and the Oklahoma Legislature enacted the bi-state arrangement in 1975 to have the two school districts share grade levels and resources. This arrangement came into effect in 1976. Prior to fall 1993, Kindergarten and grades 5-7 (as Texhoma Middle School) were covered by the Texas school while the Oklahoma school covered other grades. That fall, the Texas school took elementary grades while the Oklahoma school took secondary grades.

In 2014, the school district was rated "met standard" by the Texas Education Agency.
