= Pringle-Morse Consolidated Independent School District =

School district in Texas

Pringle-Morse Consolidated Independent School District is a public school district based in the community of Morse, Texas (US).

Besides Morse, the only other sizeable community in the district is Pringle.

Pringle-Morse Consolidated ISD covers southwestern Hansford County, northern Hutchinson County, and a small portion of southeastern Sherman County. It has one campus that serves students in grades pre-kindergarten through eight.

In 2009, the school district was rated "recognized" by the Texas Education Agency.
