= Gruver Independent School District =

School district in Texas

Location
- Gruver Texas; USA
- Coordinates: 36°18′43″N 101°44′58″W

District information
- Type: Public
- Superintendent: Wade Callaway

Other information
- Website: www.gruverisd.net

Gruver Independent School District is a public school district based in Gruver, Texas (USA).

It is mainly in Hansford County, with a small portion of the district extending into Sherman County.

In 2009, the school district was rated Exemplary by the TEA ratings, and in 2010 they followed up with another Exemplary rating for the district.

== Schools ==
- Gruver High School (Grades 9–12)
- Gruver Middle (Grades 5–8)
- Gruver Elementary (Grades PK-4)
  - 2004 National Blue Ribbon School
