= Spearman Independent School District =

School district in Texas

Spearman Independent School District is a public school district based in Spearman, Texas (USA). Located in Hansford County, portions of the district extend into Ochiltree and Hutchinson counties.

In 2009, the school district was rated "academically acceptable" by the Texas Education Agency.

== Schools ==
- Spearman High School (Grades 9–12)
- Spearman Junior High School (Grades 6–8)
- Gus Birdwell Elementary School (Grades PK–5)
