= Brenen Thompson =

American football player (born 2003)

No. 89 – Los Angeles Chargers
- Position: Wide receiver
- Roster status: Active

Personal information
- Born: July 25, 2003 (age 23); Spearman, Texas, U.S.
- Listed height: 5 ft 9 in (1.75 m)
- Listed weight: 170 lb (77 kg)

Career information
- High school: Spearman (Spearman, Texas)
- College: Texas (2022); Oklahoma (2023–2024); Mississippi State (2025)
- NFL draft: 2026: 4th round, 105th overall pick

Career history
- Los Angeles Chargers (2026–present)

Awards and highlights
- Second-team All-SEC (2025)

Career NFL statistics as of Week 4, 2026
- Receptions: 1
- Receiving yards: 13
- Stats at Pro Football Reference

Brenen Thompson (born July 25, 2003) is an American professional football wide receiver for the Los Angeles Chargers of the National Football League (NFL). He played college football for the Mississippi State Bulldogs, Oklahoma Sooners, and Texas Longhorns. Thompson was selected by the Chargers in the fourth round of the 2026 NFL draft.

== Early life ==
Thompson was born on July 25, 2003 in Spearman, Texas. Thompson lived in Amarillo, Texas and Early, Texas growing up before returning to Spearman where he attended Spearman High School. Coming out of high school, he was rated as a four-star recruit, and the 89th overall player in the class of 2022, where he committed to play college football for the Texas Longhorns over offers from Oklahoma State and Texas A&M.

== College career ==
=== Texas ===
In his freshman season in 2022, he hauled in just one reception. After the conclusion of the 2022 season, he decided to enter his name into the NCAA transfer portal.

=== Oklahoma ===
Thompson transferred to play for the Oklahoma Sooners. During the 2023 season, he recorded seven receptions for 241 yards and two touchdowns. In the 2023 Alamo Bowl, he recorded two receptions for 83 yards and a touchdown against Arizona. In the 2024 season, Thompson made ten starts, hauling in 19 receptions for 230 yards and two touchdowns. After the conclusion of the 2024 season, he decided to enter his name into the NCAA transfer portal.

=== Mississippi State ===
Thompson transferred to play for the Mississippi State Bulldogs.

=== Statistics ===
Year	Team	GP	Receiving			
Year	Team	GP	Rec	Yds	Avg	TD
2022	Texas	9	1	32	32.0	0
2023	Oklahoma	7	7	241	34.4	2
2024	Oklahoma	11	19	230	12.1	2
2025	Mississippi State	13	57	1,054	18.5	6
Career		40	84	1,557	18.5	10

== Professional career ==
Pre-draft measurables
Height	Weight	Arm length	Hand span	Wingspan	40-yard dash	10-yard split	20-yard split
5 ft 9 3/8 in (1.76 m)	164 lb (74 kg)	29 3/8 in (0.75 m)	9 in (0.23 m)	5 ft 11 3/8 in (1.81 m)	4.26 s	1.54 s	2.53 s
All values from NFL Combine

Thompson was selected by the Los Angeles Chargers in the fourth round with the 105th overall pick in the 2026 NFL draft.
