= Texhoma Public Schools =

School district in Oklahoma, United States

Texhoma Public Schools (TPS) is a school district headquartered in Texhoma, Oklahoma. It covers portions of Texas County.

Due to its isolated location on the border of the Texas Panhandle and the Oklahoma Panhandle, the district operates under an arrangement with the Texhoma Independent School District, a public school district located in adjacent Texhoma, Texas. All students residing in Texhoma ISD and Texhoma Public Schools attend school in Texhoma ISD for grades K-4, then attend school in Texhoma Public Schools for grades 5–12. Therefore the district also educates students in Sherman County and Hansford County in that state.

The districts have separate curricula, boards of education, and taxation systems. They share sports teams. The two districts charge each other for tuition. Students of the two districts learn about the history of each state.

== History ==
The Texas Legislature and the Oklahoma Legislature enacted the bi-state arrangement in 1975 to have the two school districts share grade levels and resources. This arrangement came into effect in 1976. Prior to fall 1993, Kindergarten and grades 5-7 were covered by the Texas school while the Oklahoma school covered other grades. That fall, the Texas school took elementary grades while the Oklahoma school took secondary grades.
