= Texhoma, Oklahoma =

Town in Oklahoma, US

- Town
- Location within Texas County, Oklahoma.
- Coordinates: 36°30′16″N 101°47′11″W
- Country: United States
- State: Oklahoma Texas
- County: Texas
- Incorporated: 1908

Area
  - Total: 0.64 sq mi (1.66 km^{2})
  - Land: 0.64 sq mi (1.66 km^{2})
  - Water: 0 sq mi (0.00 km^{2})
- Elevation: 3,487 ft (1,063 m)

Population (2020)
  - Total: 856
  - Density: 1,335.3/sq mi (515.55/km^{2})
- Time zone: UTC-6 (Central (CST))
  - Summer (DST): UTC-5 (CDT)
- ZIP code: 73949
- Area code: 580
- FIPS code: 40-73100
- GNIS feature ID: 2413378
- Website: www.townoftexhoma.com

Texhoma is a town in Texas County, Oklahoma, United States. The population was 856 at the 2020 census. Texhoma is a divided city with the Texas–Oklahoma state border separating the town from Texhoma, Texas. The name of the town is a portmanteau of Texas and Oklahoma. Founded around the Rock Island Railroad laying tracks through the area, much of the town's local economy is from ranching and livestock.

== History ==
Before No Man's Land was opened for settlers in 1890, the area now known as the Oklahoma Panhandle was sparsely settled ranchland. After the opening, filing occurred on some of the land near the CCC Ranch, mostly by the cowboys, and sold to the ranch as soon as proved up. Expansion of the Rock Island Railroad tracks from Liberal, Kansas to Santa Rosa, New Mexico spurred the settlement's formation.

A post office named Loretta was established May 7, 1898, but anticipating the railroad, the post office in 1901 moved and changed its name to Texhoma, said name referring to the community's location on the state line. Very few claims were filed on until the railroad was assured. The town grew quickly to a population near 1,000, serving as the closest railroad town to the people who lived as far north and west as present Boise City, and south into the Texas Panhandle to the present town of Gruver.

After a 1932 survey moved the border south by about 365 feet, most of the businesses in Texhoma, Texas were moved into Oklahoma.

== Geography ==
Texhoma is located at 36°30′16″N 101°47′11″W (36.504421, -101.786517). According to the United States Census Bureau, the town has a total area of 0.6 square miles (1.6 km^{2}), all land.

== Demographics ==
=== 2020 census ===
Historical population
Census	Pop.	Note	%±
1910	372		—
1920	687		84.7%
1930	819		19.2%
1940	577		−29.5%
1950	1,464		153.7%
1960	911		−37.8%
1970	921		1.1%
1980	785		−14.8%
1990	746		−5.0%
2000	935		25.3%
2010	926		−1.0%
2020	856		−7.6%
U.S. Decennial Census

As of the 2020 census, Texhoma had a population of 856. The median age was 38.5 years. 25.8% of residents were under the age of 18 and 15.4% of residents were 65 years of age or older. For every 100 females there were 102.4 males, and for every 100 females age 18 and over there were 100.9 males age 18 and over.

0.0% of residents lived in urban areas, while 100.0% lived in rural areas.

There were 326 households in Texhoma, of which 37.4% had children under the age of 18 living in them. Of all households, 51.8% were married-couple households, 21.5% were households with a male householder and no spouse or partner present, and 22.1% were households with a female householder and no spouse or partner present. About 23.9% of all households were made up of individuals and 12.3% had someone living alone who was 65 years of age or older.

There were 388 housing units, of which 16.0% were vacant. The homeowner vacancy rate was 2.0% and the rental vacancy rate was 10.3%.

Racial composition as of the 2020 census
Race	Number	Percent
White	484	56.5%
Black or African American	8	0.9%
American Indian and Alaska Native	9	1.1%
Asian	1	0.1%
Native Hawaiian and Other Pacific Islander	0	0.0%
Some other race	185	21.6%
Two or more races	169	19.7%
Hispanic or Latino (of any race)	393	45.9%

== Education ==
The school district for the municipality is the Texhoma Public Schools school district.

Texhoma students in both Texas and Oklahoma are served jointly by an unusual bi-state arrangement. Kindergarten through fourth grade students are served by the Texhoma Independent School District in Texas, while fifth through twelfth grade students by Texhoma Public Schools in Oklahoma. The two districts share a sports team while having separate educational systems and using separate boards of trustees. Texhoma is the only city in Oklahoma where graduating students can attend either Oklahoma or Texas public universities at the in-state tuition rates for either.

== Transportation ==
The town is served by State Highway 95, which runs from a southern terminus at the Texas state line 42.5 miles north to the Kansas state line, as well as by U.S. Highway 54.

Texhoma Municipal Airport (FAA ID: K49); Guymon Municipal Airport (KGUY; FAA ID: GUY) is approximately 22 miles northeast.

Commercial air transportation is available at Liberal Mid-America Regional Airport in Liberal, Kansas, about 62 miles northeast, or at the larger Rick Husband Amarillo International Airport, about 110 miles to the south.

Rail freight service is available from the Union Pacific Railroad.

== Sites of interest ==
Texhoma High School is housed in a pair of monolithic dome structures.

NRHP-listed locations in the Texhoma area are:

- CCC (Three C) Ranch Headquarters (Osborn Homestead) (west of Texhoma)
- Penick House (218 N. East St.)
- Johnson-Cline Archaeological Site

== Notable people ==
- Patience Latting, Oklahoma City mayor, 1971–1983
