= Municipal Airport (Oklahoma) =

Airport in Oklahoma, United States

Municipal Airport Texhoma Municipal Airport
- IATA: none; ICAO: none; FAA LID: K49

Summary
- Airport type: Public
- Owner: City of Texhoma
- Serves: Texhoma, Oklahoma
- Elevation AMSL: 3,462 ft (1,055 m)
- Coordinates: 36°30′17″N 101°48′44″W
- Interactive map of Municipal Airport

Runways
Direction	Length		Surface
Direction	ft	m	Surface
3/21	3,564	1,086	Asphalt
17/35	2,340	713	Turf

Statistics (2009)
- Aircraft operations: 500
- Based aircraft: 6
- Source: Federal Aviation Administration

Municipal Airport (FAA LID: K49) is a public use airport in Texas County, Oklahoma, United States. The airport is owned by the City of Texhoma and is located two nautical miles (3.7 km) west of its central business district. It is also known as Texhoma Municipal Airport.

== Facilities and aircraft ==
The airport covers an area of 160 acres (65 ha) at an elevation of 3,462 feet (1,055 m) above mean sea level. It has two runways: 3/21 is 3,564 by 48 feet (1,086 x 15 m) with an asphalt surface; 17/35 is 2,340 by 75 feet (713 x 23 m) with a turf surface.

For the 12-month period ending June 11, 2009, the airport had 500 general aviation aircraft operations, an average of 42 per month. At that time there were 6 aircraft based at this airport: 4 single-engine and 1 multi-engine and 1 ultralight.

== See also ==
- List of airports in Oklahoma
