= Terrell Election Law =

1903 Texas statute

The Terrell Election Law was part of a wave of election reform legislation instituting a poll tax, secret ballot, and a closed primary system in Texas from 1902 to 1907, during the Progressive Era of United States history. The 1903 law allowed parties to restrict who could vote in their primaries, paving the way to exclude African-American voters from Democratic Party primaries. A poll tax had been established in 1902 and both laws disenfranchised African Americans.

    The Terrell Law was named for Alexander W. Terrell.[4] The law was revised in 1905–1906.[2] A 1923 amendment established a complete ban on African Americans voting in any Democratic Party primaries. Lawrence Aaron Nixon sued and the law was eventually thrown out by the U.S. Supreme Court (Nixon v. Herndon). A modified version of the law was passed by the Texas Legislature and again thrown out upon reaching the U.S. Supreme Court in a suit filed by Nixon. The decision was written by Justice Benjamin N. Cardozo.[3]
