= Texhoma, Texas =

City in Texas, US

- City
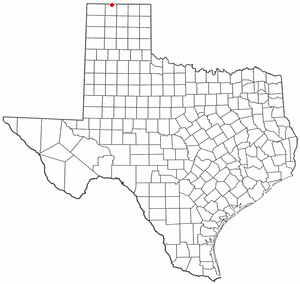
- Location of Texhoma, Texas

- Coordinates: 36°29′37″N 101°47′38″W
- Country: United States
- State: Texas
- County: Sherman
- Platted: 1906
- Incorporated: 1980
- Named for: Texoma

Area
  - Total: 1.90 sq mi (4.92 km^{2})
  - Land: 1.90 sq mi (4.92 km^{2})
  - Water: 0 sq mi (0.00 km^{2})
- Elevation: 3,504 ft (1,068 m)

Population (2020)
  - Total: 258
  - Density: 136/sq mi (52.4/km^{2})
- Time zone: UTC-6 (Central (CST))
  - Summer (DST): UTC-5 (CDT)
- ZIP code: 73960
- FIPS code: 48-72464
- GNIS feature ID: 2412056
- Website: www.townoftexhoma.com

Texhoma is a city in northeastern Sherman County, Texas, United States. The population was 258 at the 2020 census, declining from 364 in 2010. Texhoma is a divided city, with the Texas-Oklahoma state border separating the city from Texhoma, Oklahoma. It is also the northernmost settlement in the entire state of Texas.

== Geography ==
According to the United States Census Bureau, the city has a total area of 1.9 square miles (4.9 km^{2}), all land.

== History ==
Texhoma is situated on U.S. Route 54, and was a stop of the Chicago, Rock Island and Mexico Railway. The community was first platted in 1906, and had a population of 300 by 1910. The town was named for the Texoma region. The post office, started by A. Y. Ingham, lasted from December 11, 1909 to April 30, 1910, before combining with the post office in Texhoma, Oklahoma. After a 1932 survey which moved the border about 465 feet south, most of the businesses were placed in the Oklahoma side. The town incorporated in 1980.

== Demographics ==
Historical population
Census	Pop.	Note	%±
1920	313		—
1930	300		−4.2%
1940	191		−36.3%
1950	299		56.5%
1960	350		17.1%
1970	356		1.7%
1980	358		0.6%
1990	291		−18.7%
2000	371		27.5%
2010	346		−6.7%
2020	258		−25.4%
U.S. Decennial Census

=== 2020 census ===
As of the 2020 census, Texhoma had a population of 258 and 93 families residing in the city. The median age was 40.4 years, 25.6% of residents were under the age of 18, and 16.3% of residents were 65 years of age or older. For every 100 females there were 106.4 males, and for every 100 females age 18 and over there were 102.1 males age 18 and over.

0.0% of residents lived in urban areas, while 100.0% lived in rural areas.

There were 108 households in Texhoma, of which 33.3% had children under the age of 18 living in them. Of all households, 53.7% were married-couple households, 19.4% were households with a male householder and no spouse or partner present, and 20.4% were households with a female householder and no spouse or partner present. About 26.8% of all households were made up of individuals and 14.9% had someone living alone who was 65 years of age or older.

There were 133 housing units, of which 18.8% were vacant. The homeowner vacancy rate was 6.5% and the rental vacancy rate was 22.2%.

Racial composition as of the 2020 census
Race	Number	Percent
White	172	66.7%
Black or African American	0	0.0%
American Indian and Alaska Native	4	1.6%
Asian	0	0.0%
Native Hawaiian and Other Pacific Islander	0	0.0%
Some other race	27	10.5%
Two or more races	55	21.3%
Hispanic or Latino (of any race)	88	34.1%

=== 2000 census ===
As of the census of 2000, there were 371 people, 138 households, and 104 families residing in the city. The population density was 196.3 inhabitants per square mile (75.8/km^{2}). There were 155 housing units at an average density of 82.0 per square mile (31.7/km^{2}). The racial makeup of the city was 88.95% White, 0.27% African American, 1.08% Native American, 6.20% from other races, and 3.50% from two or more races. Hispanic or Latino of any race were 15.63% of the population. In terms of ancestry, 32.8% were of German, 10.2% were of American, 7.5% were of English, 7.5% were of Irish, 3.0% were of French.

There were 138 households, out of which 39.9% had children under the age of 18 living with them, 66.7% were married couples living together, 7.2% had a female householder with no husband present, and 24.6% were non-families. 23.9% of all households were made up of individuals, and 13.0% had someone living alone who was 65 years of age or older. The average household size was 2.69 and the average family size was 3.20.

In the city, the population was spread out, with 32.1% under the age of 18, 5.9% from 18 to 24, 28.6% from 25 to 44, 20.2% from 45 to 64, and 13.2% who were 65 years of age or older. The median age was 34 years. For every 100 females, there were 99.5 males. For every 100 females age 18 and over, there were 88.1 males.

The median income for a household in the city was $35,938, and the median income for a family was $47,344. Males had a median income of $31,172 versus $22,292 for females. The per capita income for the city was $16,183. About 10.3% of families and 12.4% of the population were below the poverty line, including 21.5% of those under age 18 and 4.2% of those age 65 or over.

== Education ==
The designated school district is Texhoma Independent School District. Texhoma students are served jointly by two districts: kindergarten through fourth grade students by Texhoma ISD in Texas and fifth through twelfth grade students by Texhoma Public Schools in Oklahoma. The two districts have separate boards of education and curricula while they share athletic teams. For much of the 20th century, the divided town was served by a single school district. It is the only city in Texas where graduating students can attend either Texas or Oklahoma Universities and pay in-state tuition for either.

The Texas Legislature assigns all of Sherman County to the Borger Junior College District.
