= Spearman, Texas =

- City
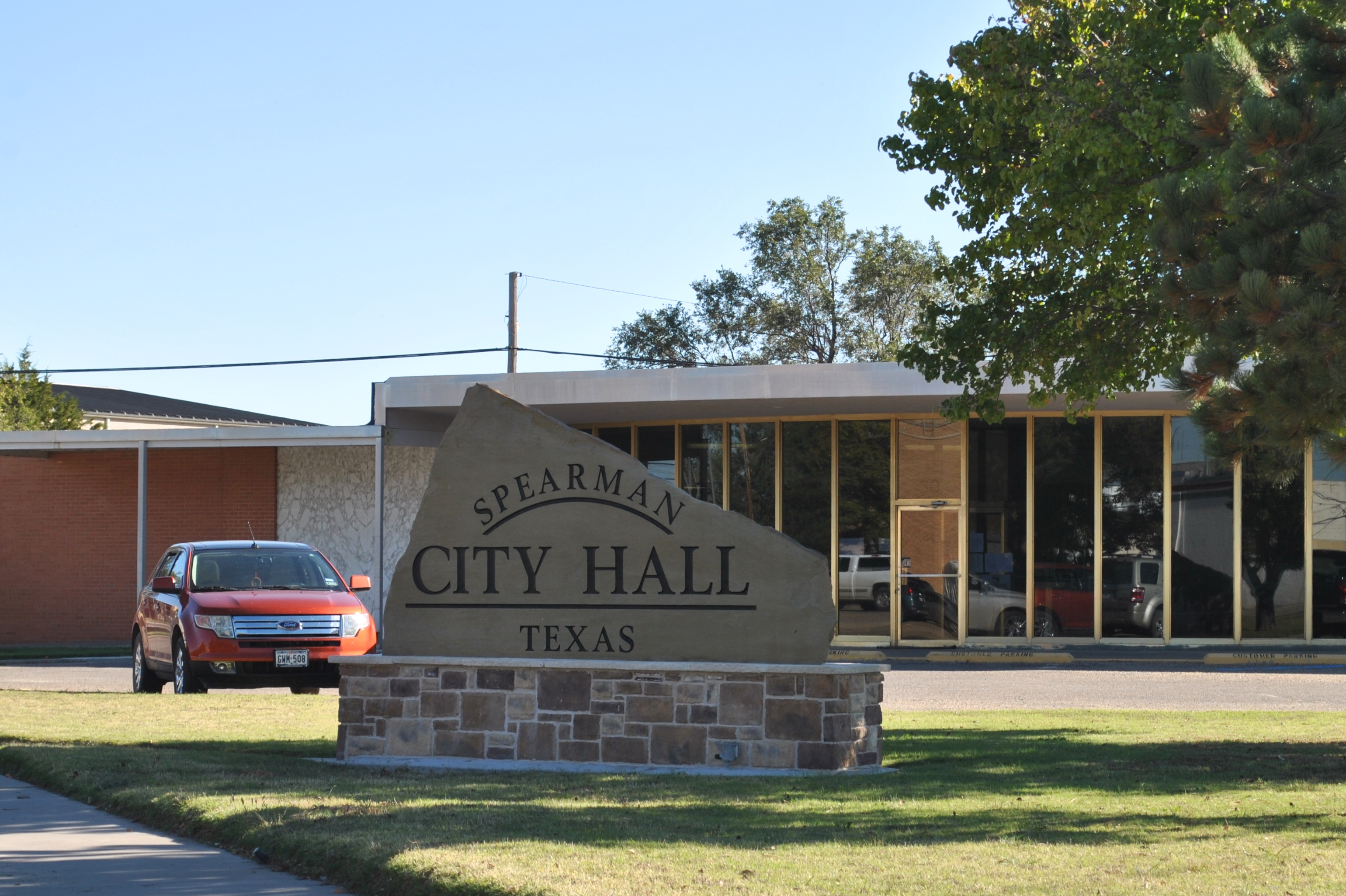
- Spearman City Hall
- Motto: "The Windmill Town"
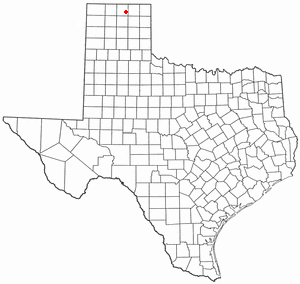
- Location of Spearman, Texas

- Coordinates: 36°11′53″N 101°11′40″W
- Country: United States
- State: Texas
- County: Hansford

Area
  - Total: 2.10 sq mi (5.45 km^{2})
  - Land: 2.10 sq mi (5.45 km^{2})
  - Water: 0 sq mi (0.00 km^{2})
- Elevation: 3,104 ft (946 m)

Population (2020)
  - Total: 3,171
  - Density: 1,510/sq mi (582/km^{2})
- Time zone: UTC-6 (Central (CST))
  - Summer (DST): UTC-5 (CDT)
- ZIP code: 79081
- Area code: 806
- FIPS code: 48-69476
- GNIS feature ID: 2411950
- Website: https://www.spearmantx.gov/

Spearman is a city in and the county seat of Hansford County, Texas, United States. As of the 2020 census, the city population was 3,171. It is known for its collection of windmills from the J.B. Buchanan windmill collection.

== History ==
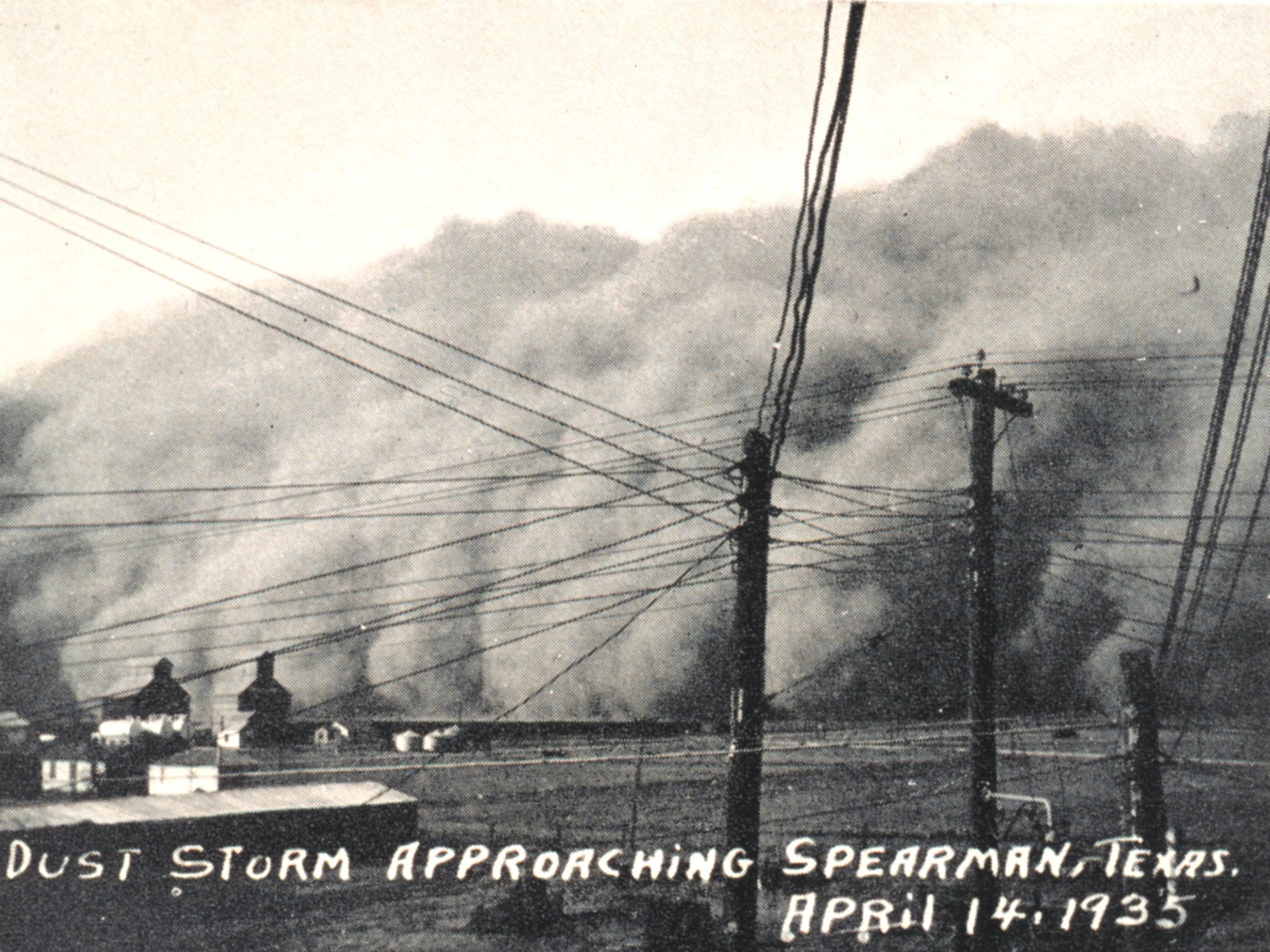
Dust storm approaching Spearman in 1935 during the Dust Bowl

Spearman was platted in May 1917 in anticipation of construction of the North Texas and Santa Fe Railway. A post office opened in 1917, and by that time, E. C. Hays had a store near the site. The city was named for Thomas E. Spearman, a vice president of the North Texas and Santa Fe Railway.

World War I delayed completion of the railroad from Shattuck, Oklahoma, until October 1919, but Spearman was already thriving; several churches and businesses had moved in from Hansford. Spearman remained the terminus of the railroad until 1931, when the line was extended to Morse and points south. The town was incorporated in 1921 and had 30 businesses, a brick school building, and a population of 1,000 by 1926.

In the November 2011 election, Spearman residents voted to allow the sale of alcoholic beverages within the city limits, making Spearman a "wet" city in an otherwise "dry" county. The law took effect December 15, 2011, and allows the sale of beer and wine in retail establishments such as grocery stores and all liquor sales in a licensed liquor store. Additionally, all alcoholic beverages may now be sold in restaurants that apply for and receive a liquor license.

== Geography ==
According to the United States Census Bureau, the city has a total area of 2.1 square miles (5.4 km^{2}), all land.

=== Climate ===
According to the Köppen climate classification system, Spearman has a semiarid climate, BSk on climate maps.

== Demographics ==
Historical population
Census	Pop.	Note	%±
1930	1,580		—
1940	1,105		−30.1%
1950	1,852		67.6%
1960	3,555		92.0%
1970	3,435		−3.4%
1980	3,413		−0.6%
1990	3,197		−6.3%
2000	3,021		−5.5%
2010	3,368		11.5%
2020	3,171		−5.8%
U.S. Decennial Census

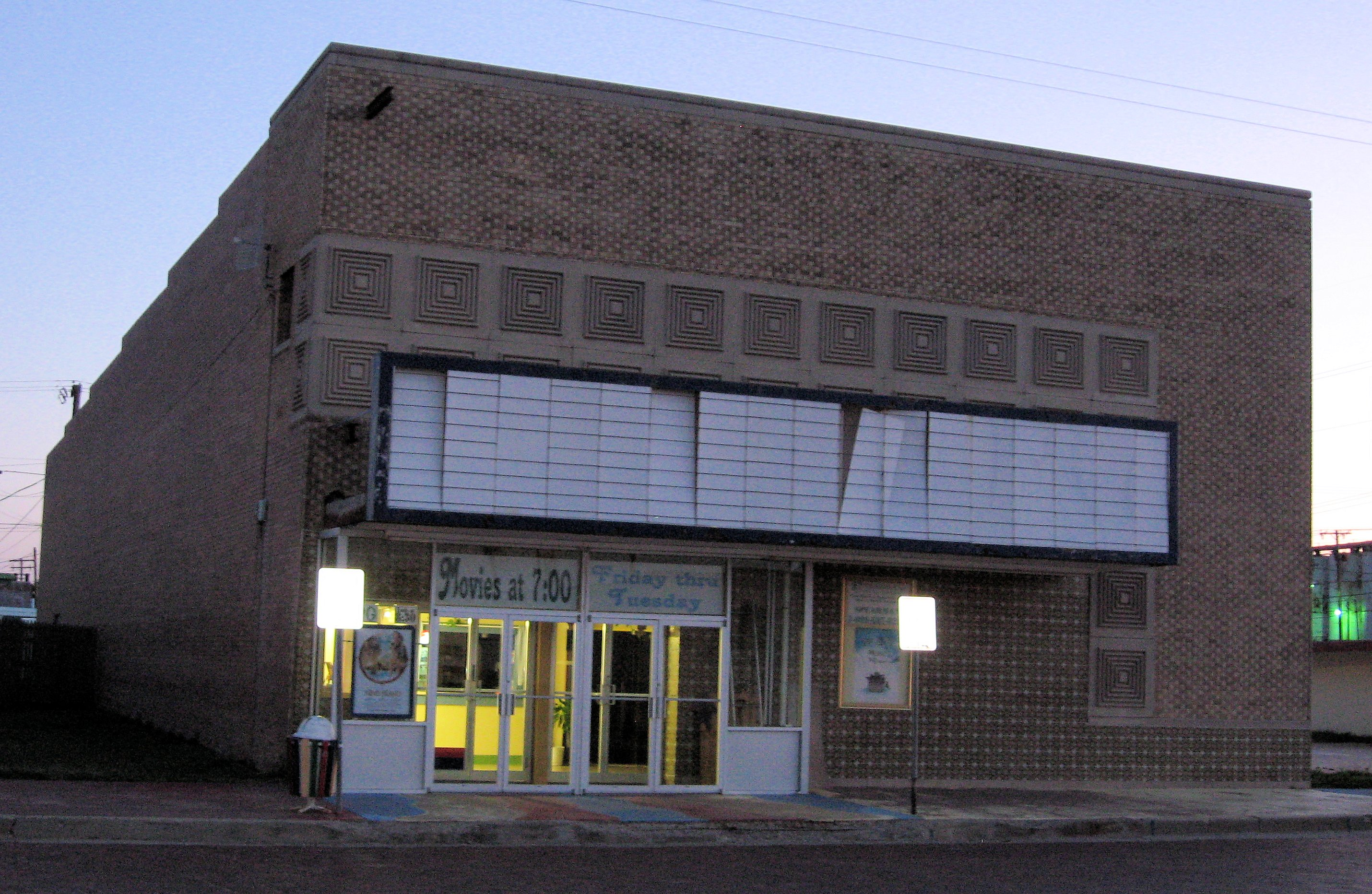
Lyric Theater

=== 2020 census ===
As of the 2020 census, there were 3,171 people, 1,178 households, and 815 families residing in the city. The median age was 35.6 years, 29.5% of residents were under the age of 18, and 16.3% of residents were 65 years of age or older. For every 100 females, there were 97.6 males, and for every 100 females age 18 and over there were 93.6 males age 18 and over.

0.0% of residents lived in urban areas, while 100.0% lived in rural areas.

Of the 1,178 households in Spearman, 39.6% had children under the age of 18 living in them, 58.0% were married-couple households, 16.1% were households with a male householder and no spouse or partner present, and 22.5% were households with a female householder and no spouse or partner present. About 23.2% of all households were made up of individuals and 12.1% had someone living alone who was 65 years of age or older.

There were 1,354 housing units, of which 15.8% were vacant. The homeowner vacancy rate was 1.6% and the rental vacancy rate was 13.0%.

Racial composition as of the 2020 census
Race	Number	Percent
White	1,869	58.9%
Black or African American	11	0.3%
American Indian and Alaska Native	25	0.8%
Asian	7	0.2%
Native Hawaiian and Other Pacific Islander	2	0.1%
Some other race	826	26.0%
Two or more races	431	13.6%
Hispanic or Latino (of any race)	1,768	55.8%

=== 2010 census ===
As of the census of 2010, 3,368 people, 1,137 households, and 817 families resided in the city. The population increased around 11% from the 2000 Census count of 3,021. The population density was 1,445.0 inhabitants per square mile (557.9/km^{2}). The 1,278 housing units averaged 611.3 per square mile (236.1/km^{2}). The racial makeup of the city was 49.2% White, 0.4% African American, 0.1% Native American, 0.4% Asian, and 1% from two or more races. Hispanics or Latinos of any race were 48.9% of the population. These numbers represent significant demographic changes in Spearman over the past decade.

Of the 1,137 households, 36.0% had children under the age of 18 living with them, 61.8% were married couples living together, 6.9% had a female householder with no husband present, and 28.1% were not families. About 26.1% of all households were made up of individuals, and 14.0% had someone living alone who was 65 years of age or older. The average household size was 2.58 and the average family size was 3.14.

In the city, the population was distributed as 28.8% under the age of 18, 6.8% from 18 to 24, 25.8% from 25 to 44, 21.9% from 45 to 64, and 16.7% who were 65 years of age or older. The median age was 37 years. For every 100 females, there were 91.7 males. For every 100 females age 18 and over, there were 89.6 males.

As of 2009, the median income for a household in the city was $48,021, and for a family was $52,085. The median per capita income for the city was $17,314. About 12.5% of families and 18.0% of the population were below the poverty line, including 24.6% of those under age 18 and 18.6% of those age 65 or over.

== Education ==
The City of Spearman is served by the Spearman Independent School District. Schools in Spearman ISD include Gus Birdwell Elementary School, Spearman Junior High School, and Spearman High School.

The Texas Legislature assigns all of Hansford County to the Borger Junior College District.

== Notable people ==
- Mickey Gates, Republican member of the Arkansas House of Representatives from Hot Springs, Arkansas, was reared in Spearman prior to the age of 14
- Krista Gerlich, Head Coach of the Texas Tech Lady Raiders basketball team, 1993 national champion at Texas Tech as a player, was born and raised in Spearman
- Rex Linn, the actor best known for his role as Frank Tripp on CSI: Miami, lived in the area and attended school in Spearman
- Joe Redington, founder of the Iditarod, lived in Spearman for a brief time
- Brenen Thompson, Wide Receiver for the Los Angeles Chargers, lived in Spearman and was a 4 star recruit coming out of high school
