= Hansford County, Texas =

County in Texas, United States

- County
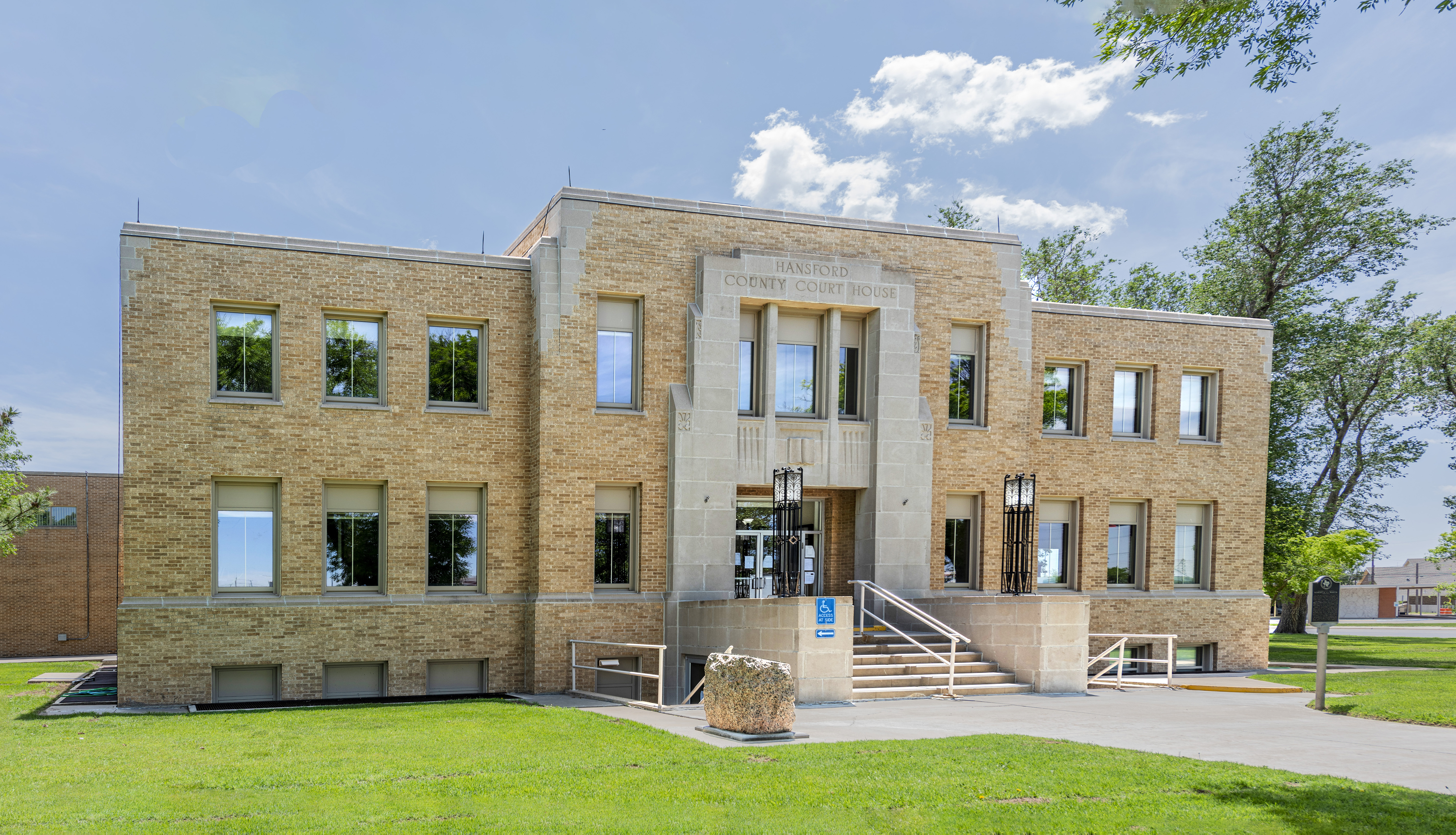
- Hansford County Courthouse in Spearman

- Location within the U.S. state of Texas
- Coordinates: 36°17′N 101°21′W
- Country: United States
- State: Texas
- Founded: 1889
- Named for: John M. Hansford
- Seat: Spearman
- Largest city: Spearman

Area
  - Total: 920 sq mi (2,400 km^{2})
  - Land: 920 sq mi (2,400 km^{2})
  - Water: 0.6 sq mi (1.6 km^{2}) 0.06%

Population (2020)
  - Total: 5,285
  - Estimate (2025): 4,944 ▼
  - Density: 5.7/sq mi (2.2/km^{2})
- Time zone: UTC−6 (Central)
  - Summer (DST): UTC−5 (CDT)
- Congressional district: 13th
- Website: www.co.hansford.tx.us

Area affected by 1930s Dust Bowl

Hansford County is a county located in the U.S. state of Texas. As of the 2020 census, its population was 5,285. Its county seat is Spearman. The county was created in 1876 and organized in 1889. It is named for John M. Hansford, a Texas state congressman and judge.

== History ==
=== Native Americans ===
In 1873, English brothers James Hamilton Cator and Arthur J. L. (Bob) Cator were sent by their father, British naval officer Captain John Bertie Cator, to Kansas in search of financial opportunity. The brothers soon found their true calling as buffalo hunters and established an outpost along the North Palo Duro Creek. They named this camp Zulu, and it soon became known as Zulu Stockade.

The depletion of the buffalo herds led in part to the ongoing conflict between Indians and settlers. The Second Battle of Adobe Walls took place in neighboring Hutchinson County in 1874 and led to the Red River War of 1874–1875. A group of buffalo hunters attempted a revitalization of Fort Adobe. The Comanches, Cheyenne, Arapaho, and Kiowa saw the fort and the decimation of the buffalo herd as threats to their existence. Comanche medicine man Isa-tai prophesied a victory and immunity to the white man's bullets in battle. Quanah Parker lead several hundred in a raid on the fort. The buffalo hunters were able to force the Indians into retreat. The Red River War of 1874-1875 was a United States Army campaign to force the removal of Indians in Texas and their relocation to reservations, to open the region to white settlers.

=== Establishment and growth ===
The Texas Legislature formed Hansford County in 1876 from Young and Bexar Counties. The county was organized in 1889. The town of Hansford became the first county seat.

Early large ranches in Hansford County were spread in neighboring counties, as well. By 1890, only 23 ranches were in operation in the county. In November 1876, Kansan Thomas Sherman Bugbee established the Quarter Circle T Ranch. The Scissors Ranch was begun in 1878 by William E. Anderson at the Adobe Walls site. The ranch was named after the brand, which looked like a pair of scissors. Coloradan Richard E. McNalty moved to Texas and began the Turkey Track Ranch, which he sold to Charles Wood and Jack Snider in 1881. Scotland- born James M. Coburn formed the Hansford Land and Cattle Company. The Quarter Circle T Ranch and Scissors Ranch were sold to Coburn in 1882. Coburn acquired the Turkey Track Ranch in 1883.

In 1887, Hansford became a stage stop on the old Tascosa-Dodge City Trail.

In 1909, Anders L. Mordt began to bring in Norwegian farmers to settle the northern part of the county, centering on a rural community they named Oslo.

By 1920, 221 farms and ranches had been established in the county. The same year, the North Texas and Santa Fe Railway built into Spearman. By 1929, Spearman became the county seat. Chicago, Rock Island and Gulf Railway built southward in the 1920s leading to Gruver, becoming the second-largest town in the county. In 1931, the Santa Fe Railroad connected with the Rock Island, joining Morse.

The county began to be connected by highways and farm roads from the 1920s through the 1940s. Oil was discovered in Hansford County in 1937. By the end of 1974, 38,279,469 barrels (6,085,949.2 m^{3}) had been extracted from county lands since 1937. By the 1980s, Hansford County had a diversified economy based on agriculture, oil, and transportation.

== Geography ==
According to the U.S. Census Bureau, the county has a total area of 920 square miles (2,400 km^{2}), of which 920 square miles (2,400 km^{2}) are land and 0.6 square miles (1.6 km^{2}) (0.06%) is covered by water.

=== Major highways ===
- State Highway 15
- State Highway 51
- State Highway 136
- State Highway 207
- Loop 84

=== Adjacent counties ===
- Texas County, Oklahoma (north)
- Ochiltree County (east)
- Roberts County (southeast)
- Hutchinson County (south)
- Sherman County (west)

== Demographics ==
Historical population
Census	Pop.	Note	%±
1880	18		—
1890	133		638.9%
1900	167		25.6%
1910	935		459.9%
1920	1,354		44.8%
1930	3,548		162.0%
1940	2,783		−21.6%
1950	4,202		51.0%
1960	6,208		47.7%
1970	6,351		2.3%
1980	6,209		−2.2%
1990	5,848		−5.8%
2000	5,369		−8.2%
2010	5,613		4.5%
2020	5,285		−5.8%
2025 (est.)	4,944	▼	−6.5%
U.S. Decennial Census; 1850–1900 1910; 1920 1930 1940; 1950 1960 1970; 1980 1990 2000; 2010 2020

=== Racial and ethnic composition ===
Hansford County, Texas – Racial and ethnic composition Note: the US Census treats Hispanic/Latino as an ethnic category. This table excludes Latinos from the racial categories and assigns them to a separate category. Hispanics/Latinos may be of any race.
Race / Ethnicity (NH = Non-Hispanic)	Pop 2000	Pop 2010	Pop 2020	% 2000	% 2010	% 2020
White alone (NH)	3,604	3,088	2,552	67.13%	55.02%	48.29%
Black or African American alone (NH)	1	31	12	0.02%	0.55%	0.23%
Native American or Alaska Native alone (NH)	18	11	16	0.34%	0.20%	0.30%
Asian alone (NH)	12	16	9	0.22%	0.29%	0.17%
Pacific Islander alone (NH)	0	0	3	0.00%	0.00%	0.06%
Other race alone (NH)	1	6	18	0.02%	0.11%	0.34%
Mixed race or Multiracial (NH)	43	31	60	0.80%	0.55%	1.14%
Hispanic or Latino (any race)	1,690	2,430	2,615	31.48%	43.29%	49.48%
Total	5,369	5,613	5,285	100.00%	100.00%	100.00%

=== 2020 census ===
As of the 2020 census, the county had a population of 5,285. The median age was 36.8 years. 28.6% of residents were under the age of 18 and 16.6% of residents were 65 years of age or older. For every 100 females there were 98.5 males, and for every 100 females age 18 and over there were 97.1 males age 18 and over.

The racial makeup of the county was 61.5% White, 0.3% Black or African American, 0.6% American Indian and Alaska Native, 0.2% Asian, 0.1% Native Hawaiian and Pacific Islander, 24.1% from some other race, and 13.3% from two or more races. Hispanic or Latino residents of any race comprised 49.5% of the population.

<0.1% of residents lived in urban areas, while 100.0% lived in rural areas.

There were 1,936 households in the county, of which 38.1% had children under the age of 18 living in them. Of all households, 60.7% were married-couple households, 16.1% were households with a male householder and no spouse or partner present, and 19.9% were households with a female householder and no spouse or partner present. About 21.2% of all households were made up of individuals and 11.5% had someone living alone who was 65 years of age or older.

There were 2,280 housing units, of which 15.1% were vacant. Among occupied housing units, 76.3% were owner-occupied and 23.7% were renter-occupied. The homeowner vacancy rate was 1.2% and the rental vacancy rate was 10.3%.

=== 2000 census ===
As of the 2000 census, 5,369 people, 2,005 households, and 1,489 families resided in the county. The population density was 6 people per square mile (2.3 people/km^{2}). The 2,329 housing units averaged 2 units per square mile (0.77/km^{2}). The racial makeup of the county was 79.88% White, 0.04% African American, 0.75% Native American, 0.22% Asian, 17.47% from other races, and 1.64% from two or more races. About 31.48% of the population was Hispanic or Latino of any race. In ancestry, 15.6% were of German, 8.4% were of English, 8.2% were of Irish, 6.0% were of American, 3.2% were of Dutch, and 2.3% were of Norwegian.

Of the 2,005 households, 36.90% had children under the age of 18 living with them, 65.00% were married couples living together, 5.90% had a female householder with no husband present, and 25.70% were not families. About 24.00% of all households were made up of individuals, and 12.40% had someone living alone who was 65 years of age or older. The average household size was 2.63 and the average family size was 3.14.

In the county, the population was distributed as 29.30% under the age of 18, 6.80% from 18 to 24, 26.30% from 25 to 44, 22.30% from 45 to 64, and 15.20% who were 65 years of age or older. The median age was 36 years. For every 100 females, there were 96.50 males. For every 100 females age 18 and over, there were 96.40 males.

The median income for a household in the county was $35,438, and for a family was $40,281. Males had a median income of $29,022 versus $17,668 for females. The per capita income for the county was $17,408. About 12.00% of families and 16.40% of the population were below the poverty line, including 22.60% of those under age 18 and 15.00% of those age 65 or over.

== Communities ==
=== Cities ===
- Gruver
- Spearman (county seat)

=== Census-designated place ===
- Morse

== Politics ==
Hansford County is located within District 87 of the Texas House of Representatives. Hansford County is located within District 31 of the Texas Senate. The county has been strongly Republican at a presidential level since 1952, with no Democrat exceeding Texas native Lyndon B. Johnson's 41.8% share of the vote in 1964 during that time. In recent elections the Democrats have struggled to win 10% of the vote, with Barack Obama in 2008 being the most recent Democratic nominee to do so.

United States presidential election results for Hansford County, Texas
Year	Republican		Democratic		Third party(ies)	
Year	No.	%	No.	%	No.	%
1912	12	7.95%	93	61.59%	46	30.46%
1916	47	19.92%	166	70.34%	23	9.75%
1920	54	29.35%	124	67.39%	6	3.26%
1924	76	20.94%	263	72.45%	24	6.61%
1928	417	56.58%	319	43.28%	1	0.14%
1932	67	7.44%	803	89.12%	31	3.44%
1936	74	8.03%	826	89.69%	21	2.28%
1940	150	17.05%	725	82.39%	5	0.57%
1944	203	24.11%	590	70.07%	49	5.82%
1948	206	18.26%	895	79.34%	27	2.39%
1952	1,234	72.93%	456	26.95%	2	0.12%
1956	919	62.73%	545	37.20%	1	0.07%
1960	1,322	71.89%	512	27.84%	5	0.27%
1964	1,193	58.03%	860	41.83%	3	0.15%
1968	1,359	62.11%	392	17.92%	437	19.97%
1972	1,947	88.90%	202	9.22%	41	1.87%
1976	1,401	58.23%	983	40.86%	22	0.91%
1980	2,046	78.81%	518	19.95%	32	1.23%
1984	2,213	89.38%	259	10.46%	4	0.16%
1988	1,967	81.25%	443	18.30%	11	0.45%
1992	1,660	69.08%	345	14.36%	398	16.56%
1996	1,493	76.80%	343	17.64%	108	5.56%
2000	1,874	89.75%	198	9.48%	16	0.77%
2004	1,903	88.64%	240	11.18%	4	0.19%
2008	1,847	87.87%	240	11.42%	15	0.71%
2012	1,788	91.13%	159	8.10%	15	0.76%
2016	1,730	88.85%	171	8.78%	46	2.36%
2020	1,849	90.33%	166	8.11%	32	1.56%
2024	1,842	92.15%	146	7.30%	11	0.55%

United States Senate election results for Hansford County, Texas1
Year	Republican		Democratic		Third party(ies)	
Year	No.	%	No.	%	No.	%
2024	1,802	91.06%	147	7.43%	30	1.52%

United States Senate election results for Hansford County, Texas2
Year	Republican		Democratic		Third party(ies)	
Year	No.	%	No.	%	No.	%
2020	1,844	90.93%	158	7.79%	26	1.28%

Texas Gubernatorial election results for Hansford County
Year	Republican		Democratic		Third party(ies)	
Year	No.	%	No.	%	No.	%
2022	1,419	93.23%	91	5.98%	12	0.79%

== Education ==
School districts include:

- Gruver Independent School District
- Pringle-Morse Consolidated Independent School District
- Spearman Independent School District
- Texhoma Independent School District

Residents of Texhoma ISD attend that district's schools and Texhoma Public Schools in Oklahoma for different grade levels.

The Texas Legislature assigns all of Hansford County to the Borger Junior College District.

== See also ==
- Dry counties
- List of museums in the Texas Panhandle
- Recorded Texas Historic Landmarks in Hansford County
