= Gruver, Texas =

- City
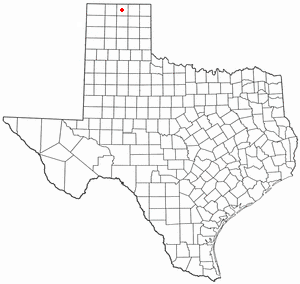
- Location of Gruver, Texas

- Coordinates: 36°15′46″N 101°24′20″W
- Country: United States
- State: Texas
- County: Hansford

Area
  - Total: 1.10 sq mi (2.85 km^{2})
  - Land: 1.10 sq mi (2.85 km^{2})
  - Water: 0 sq mi (0.00 km^{2})
- Elevation: 3,176 ft (968 m)

Population (2020)
  - Total: 1,130
  - Density: 1,026.9/sq mi (396.49/km^{2})
- Time zone: UTC-6 (Central (CST))
  - Summer (DST): UTC-5 (CDT)
- ZIP code: 79040
- Area code: 806
- FIPS code: 48-31412
- GNIS feature ID: 2410671
- Website: www.cityofgruver.com

Gruver is a city in Hansford County, Texas, United States. The population was 1,130 at the 2020 census. Farwell, in the center of Hansford County, approximately three miles east of what became Gruver, was established in 1880 by the Canott family of Illinois, and was the first town in the county. Gruver was established shortly after, and Farwell rapidly fell into oblivion after 1889, when it lost a county seat election to Hansford.

== History ==
Gruver was named for Joseph Hezkiah Gruver and his son, Lawrence, who around 1907 established a ranch nine miles west of what is now the townsite. The Chicago, Rock Island and Pacific Railroad reached the town in 1929. Gruver was incorporated in 1930.

== Geography ==
According to the United States Census Bureau, the city has a total area of 1.1 square miles (2.8 km^{2}), all land.

== Demographics ==
Historical population
Census	Pop.	Note	%±
1940	350		—
1950	813		132.3%
1960	1,030		26.7%
1970	1,265		22.8%
1980	1,216		−3.9%
1990	1,172		−3.6%
2000	1,162		−0.9%
2010	1,194		2.8%
2020	1,130		−5.4%
U.S. Decennial Census

=== Racial and ethnic composition ===
Racial composition as of the 2020 census
Race	Number	Percent
White	685	60.6%
Black or African American	1	0.1%
American Indian and Alaska Native	6	0.5%
Asian	0	0.0%
Native Hawaiian and Other Pacific Islander	0	0.0%
Some other race	295	26.1%
Two or more races	143	12.7%
Hispanic or Latino (of any race)	517	45.8%

=== 2020 census ===
As of the 2020 census, Gruver had a population of 1,130 and 294 families residing in the city. The median age was 36.7 years, 28.7% of residents were under the age of 18, and 15.4% of residents were 65 years of age or older. For every 100 females there were 100.0 males, and for every 100 females age 18 and over there were 104.1 males age 18 and over.

There were 418 households in Gruver, of which 35.2% had children under the age of 18 living in them. Of all households, 59.8% were married-couple households, 18.9% were households with a male householder and no spouse or partner present, and 18.9% were households with a female householder and no spouse or partner present. About 24.1% of all households were made up of individuals and 15.8% had someone living alone who was 65 years of age or older.

There were 501 housing units, of which 16.6% were vacant. The homeowner vacancy rate was 1.2% and the rental vacancy rate was 8.7%.

0.0% of residents lived in urban areas, while 100.0% lived in rural areas.

=== 2000 census ===
At the 2000 census, 1,162 people, 439 households and 327 families resided in the city. The population density was 1,089.0 inhabitants per square mile (420.5/km^{2}). The 509 housing units averaged 477.0/sq mi (183.7/km^{2}). The racial makeup of the city was 80.12% White, 0.69% Native American, 17.21% from other races, and 1.98% from two or more races. Hispanics or Latinos of any race were 28.31% of the population.

Of the 439 households, 39.9% had children under the age of 18 living with them, 64.9% were married couples living together, 5.7% had a female householder with no husband present, and 25.3% were not families. About 23.9% of all households were made up of individuals, and 12.8% had someone living alone who was 65 years of age or older. The average household size was 2.65 and the average family size was 3.15.

The population was distributed as 31.3% under the age of 18, 6.5% from 18 to 24, 27.0% from 25 to 44, 20.2% from 45 to 64, and 15.0% who were 65 years of age or older. The median age was 35 years. For every 100 females, there were 100.3 males. For every 100 females age 18 and over, there were 99.0 males.

The median household income was $32,031 and the median family income was $37,333. Males had a median income of $26,375 versus $17,143 for females. The per capita income for the city was $18,408. About 12.2% of families and 16.2% of the population were below the poverty line, including 21.5% of those under age 18 and 16.2% of those age 65 or over.

== Education ==
The City of Gruver is served by the Gruver Independent School District, and is the location of Gruver High School.

The Texas Legislature assigns all of Hansford County to the Borger Junior College District.

== Tornado ==
On June 9, 1971, the largest observed tornado in history as of that time occurred just to the west-southwest of Gruver. Since then, it has been bested by a 2004 tornado in Hallam, Nebraska, and the May 2013 tornado in El Reno, Oklahoma. The average width of the tornado along its path was estimated at 2,500 yards and the maximum width was approximately two miles along its 15-mile path. The tornado moved very slowly. Visibility was clear and witnesses reported seeing the tornado from as far as 25 miles away. The tornado was reported to have been on a direct track for the City of Gruver, but veered away and spared the town from its effects. In spite of the size of the tornado, damage was minor; total property damage from the tornado was put at $15,000. However, the tornado was accompanied by one- to two-inch hail that did significant damage to the wheat crops near the path of the tornado.

== Climate ==
According to the Köppen climate classification system, Gruver has a semiarid climate, BSk on climate maps.

Climate data for Gruver, Texas (1991–2020 normals, extremes 1962–present)
Month	Jan	Feb	Mar	Apr	May	Jun	Jul	Aug	Sep	Oct	Nov	Dec	Year
Record high °F (°C)	82 (28)	92 (33)	103 (39)	100 (38)	104 (40)	110 (43)	110 (43)	110 (43)	106 (41)	99 (37)	91 (33)	82 (28)	110 (43)
Mean daily maximum °F (°C)	49.0 (9.4)	52.7 (11.5)	61.8 (16.6)	70.1 (21.2)	79.3 (26.3)	88.9 (31.6)	93.1 (33.9)	91.1 (32.8)	84.0 (28.9)	72.3 (22.4)	60.2 (15.7)	49.0 (9.4)	71.0 (21.7)
Daily mean °F (°C)	34.6 (1.4)	37.7 (3.2)	46.2 (7.9)	54.5 (12.5)	64.7 (18.2)	74.5 (23.6)	79.1 (26.2)	77.3 (25.2)	69.5 (20.8)	57.1 (13.9)	45.0 (7.2)	35.3 (1.8)	56.3 (13.5)
Mean daily minimum °F (°C)	20.2 (−6.6)	22.8 (−5.1)	30.6 (−0.8)	39.0 (3.9)	50.2 (10.1)	60.2 (15.7)	65.0 (18.3)	63.5 (17.5)	55.0 (12.8)	42.0 (5.6)	29.8 (−1.2)	21.6 (−5.8)	41.7 (5.4)
Record low °F (°C)	−14 (−26)	−14 (−26)	−5 (−21)	12 (−11)	25 (−4)	41 (5)	43 (6)	45 (7)	27 (−3)	10 (−12)	−4 (−20)	−12 (−24)	−14 (−26)
Average precipitation inches (mm)	0.61 (15)	0.46 (12)	1.25 (32)	1.80 (46)	2.50 (64)	3.32 (84)	2.67 (68)	2.67 (68)	1.71 (43)	1.84 (47)	0.81 (21)	0.97 (25)	20.61 (523)
Average snowfall inches (cm)	2.7 (6.9)	0.9 (2.3)	2.0 (5.1)	0.5 (1.3)	0.0 (0.0)	0.0 (0.0)	0.0 (0.0)	0.0 (0.0)	0.0 (0.0)	0.5 (1.3)	1.4 (3.6)	3.8 (9.7)	11.8 (30)
Average precipitation days (≥ 0.01 in)	2.7	2.9	4.5	5.0	6.8	7.1	7.0	7.2	5.2	4.6	3.3	3.2	59.5
Average snowy days (≥ 0.1 in)	0.9	0.8	0.6	0.2	0.0	0.0	0.0	0.0	0.0	0.2	0.5	1.2	4.4
Source: NOAA
