= Phillips, Texas =

Coordinates: 35.68742°N 101.35111°W

- Ghost town
- Country: United States
- State: Texas
- County: Hutchinson
- Elevation: 3,061 ft (933 m)

Population (1947)
  - Total: 4,250
- Time zone: UTC-6 (Central (CST))
  - Summer (DST): UTC-5 (CDT)
- ZIP codes: 79007 (Borger)
- Area code: 806
- GNIS feature ID: 1365141

Phillips is a ghost town in Hutchinson County, Texas, United States. It was founded as Pantex, Texas. In 1938, Pantex and Whittenburg combined and renamed as Phillips for the dominant employer, the Phillips Petroleum Company, by a vote of the people.

American actress Mary Castle lived in Phillips as a girl and attended junior high school there.

State Senator and former president of West Texas A&M University Max Sherman was reared in Phillips and graduated from Phillips High School.

== Past demographics ==
Historical population
Census	Pop.	Note	%±
1950	4,105		—
1960	3,605		−12.2%
1970	2,515		−30.2%
1980	1,729		−31.3%
1990	0		−100.0%
U.S. Decennial Census; 1850–1900 1910; 1920 1930 1940; 1950 1960 1970; 1980 1990 2000; 2010

Phillips appeared as an unincorporated community in the 1950 U.S. census and was listed as a census designated place in the 1980 United States census.

Maximum population: 4,250 in 1947

== Education ==
It is served by the Plemons-Stinnett-Phillips Consolidated Independent School District.

It was a part of the Phillips Independent School District until July 1, 1987, when it merged into the PSP CISD.

On March 19, 1950, a fire destroyed the high school. Local churches housed classes until the new school was built.

== Decreasing population ==
In the 1950s and 1960s, improved highways and transportation resulted in many businesses and people moving to Borger. By 1980, the population had dropped to about 2,500.

== 1980 hydrocarbon explosion ==
A hydrocarbon explosion at the refinery in 1980 obliterated part of the industrial area and some nearby homes. Damages were estimated to be in the millions of dollars. After a long battle between the citizens of Phillips, M&M Cattle Company, and later Phillips 66, the town was permanently closed to residency, at the request of Phillips 66 Oil Company. The homes themselves were owned, but the land they sat upon was property of two local ranchers who leased the land originally to the company and later to the home owners. After the explosion, the company purchased the land from the ranches and forced the homeowners to move. In 1987, three schools and communities, Plemons, Stinnett and Phillips, created the Plemons-Stinnett-Phillips Consolidated independent School District. Three mascots, the Plemons Indians, Stinnett Rattlers and the Phillips Blackhawks were changed to create the Comanches. The campuses of the district, West Texas Elementary School, West Texas Middle School, and West Texas High School are all united as Comanches. Therefore, many homes were moved to areas nearby (Borger, Stinnett, and Fritch). The homes that were not moved were leveled.

Today, the high school is one of the few buildings left and is used for business by the Phillips 66 Refinery.
