= Frank Phillips College =

Community college in Borger, Texas, U.S.

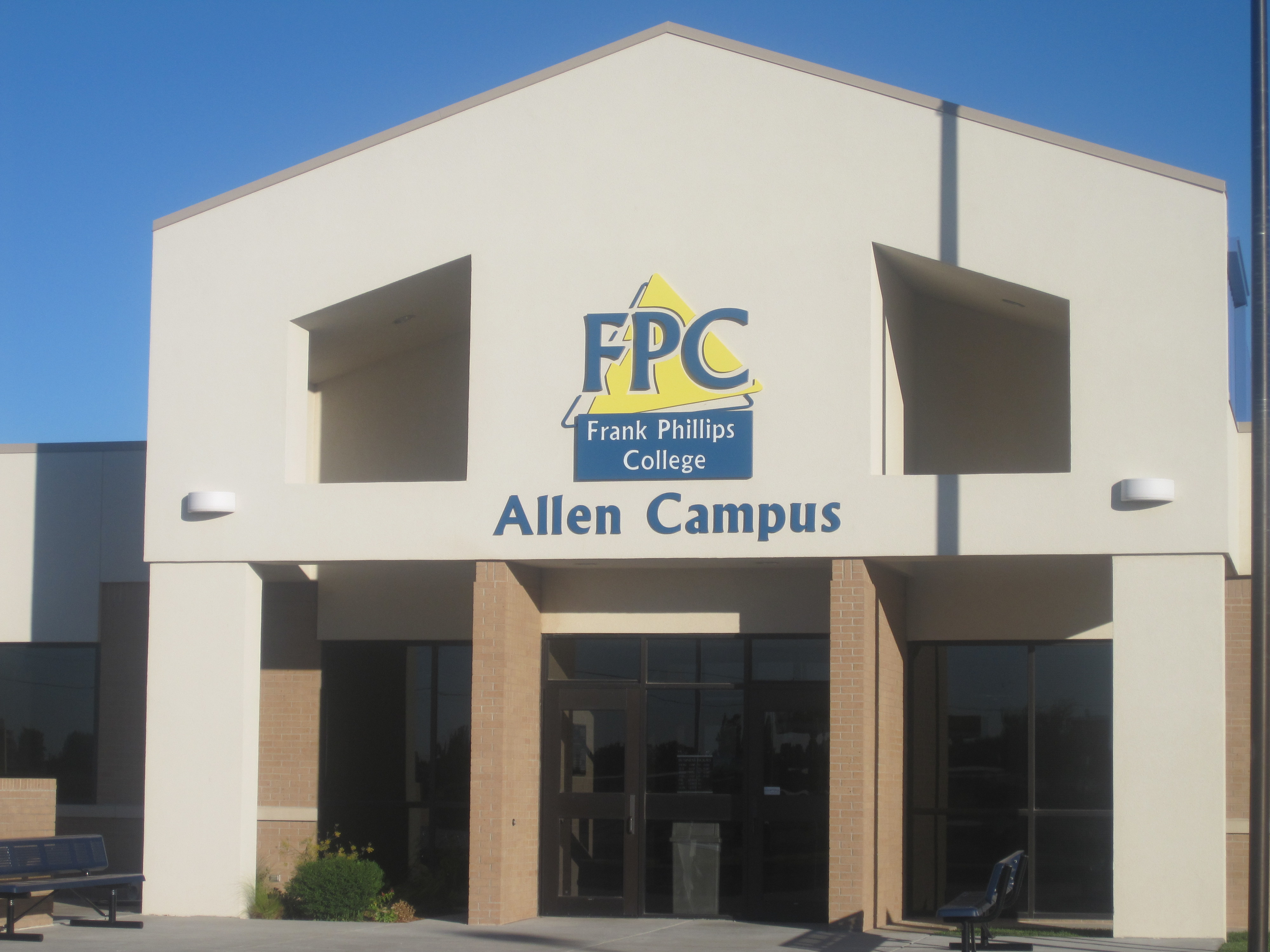
- Frank Phillips College Allen Campus building in Perryton
- Former names: Borger City Junior College
- Motto: Start Here. Go Anywhere.
- Type: Public community college
- Established: 1948
- President: Glendon Forgey
- Students: 1,540
- Location: Borger, Texas, United States; 35.655°N 101.406°W
- Mascot: Plainsmen
- Website: fpctx.edu

Frank Phillips College, formerly Borger Junior College District, is a public community college in Borger, Texas. The college also manages the Allen Campus in Perryton in Ochiltree County, the Dalhart Center in Hartley County, and the Cosmetology Center in Hereford in Deaf Smith County.

As defined by the Texas Legislature, the official service area of Frank Phillips College includes:

- the territory within the Borger Independent School District
- the territory within the Spring Creek Independent School District that is also within the junior college district's taxing district; and
- the territory within Dallam, Sherman, Hansford, Ochiltree, Lipscomb, Hartley, Hutchinson, Roberts, and Hemphill counties.

== History ==
In 1968, the college was censured by the American Association of University Professors for "not observing the generally recognized principles of academic freedom and tenure."
