= Hutchinson County Airport =

- IATA: BGD; ICAO: KBGD; FAA LID: BGD

Summary
- Airport type: Public
- Owner: Hutchinson County
- Serves: Hutchinson County, Texas
- Location: Borger, Texas
- Elevation AMSL: 3,055 ft (931 m)
- Coordinates: 35°42′03″N 101°23′37″W
- Website: HutchinsonCountyAirport.com

Map
- Location within Texas

Runways
Direction	Length		Surface
Direction	ft	m	Surface
17/35	6,299	1,920	Asphalt
3/21	3,897	1,188	Asphalt

Statistics (2021)
- Aircraft operations (year ending 9/15/2021): 6,010
- Based aircraft: 18
- Source: Federal Aviation Administration

Hutchinson County Airport (IATA: BGD, ICAO: KBGD, FAA LID: BGD) is a county-owned, public-use airport two miles north of Borger, Texas. The FAA's National Plan of Integrated Airport Systems for 2011–2015 categorized it as a general aviation facility.

== Facilities ==
The airport covers 370 acres (150 ha) at an elevation of 3,055 feet (931 m). It has two asphalt runways: 17/35 is 6,299 by 100 feet (1,920 x 30 m) and 3/21 is 3,897 by 100 feet (1,188 x 30 m).

In the 12-month period ending September 15, 2021, the airport had 6,010 aircraft operations, average 115 per week: 67% local general aviation, 33% transient general aviation, and <1% military. 18 aircraft were then based at the airport: 16 single-engine, 1 multi-engine, and 1 helicopter.

Hutchinson County Airport has two certified RNAV (GPS) instrument approach procedures.

== Past airlines ==
The airport had scheduled passenger flights on Central Airlines and successor Frontier Airlines (1950-1986) and later on commuter airline Air Central.

Central Airlines began serving Borger in the early 1950s with Douglas DC-3s to Dallas Love Field, Fort Worth (via Amon Carter Field or Meacham Field), Oklahoma City and Tulsa. In 1966 Central DC-3s flew Denver-Colorado Springs-Pueblo, CO-Amarillo-Borger-Oklahoma City-Bartlesville, OK-Parsons, KS-Kansas City. Central merged into Frontier which in 1967 flew Convair 600s Amarillo-Borger-Oklahoma City-Bartlesville, OK-Kansas City. By 1970 Frontier had left Borger. In 1979 commuter airline Air Central flew Piper Navajos to Oklahoma City.

The airport currently has no airline service.

== See also ==
- List of airports in Texas
