= Borger, Texas =

- City
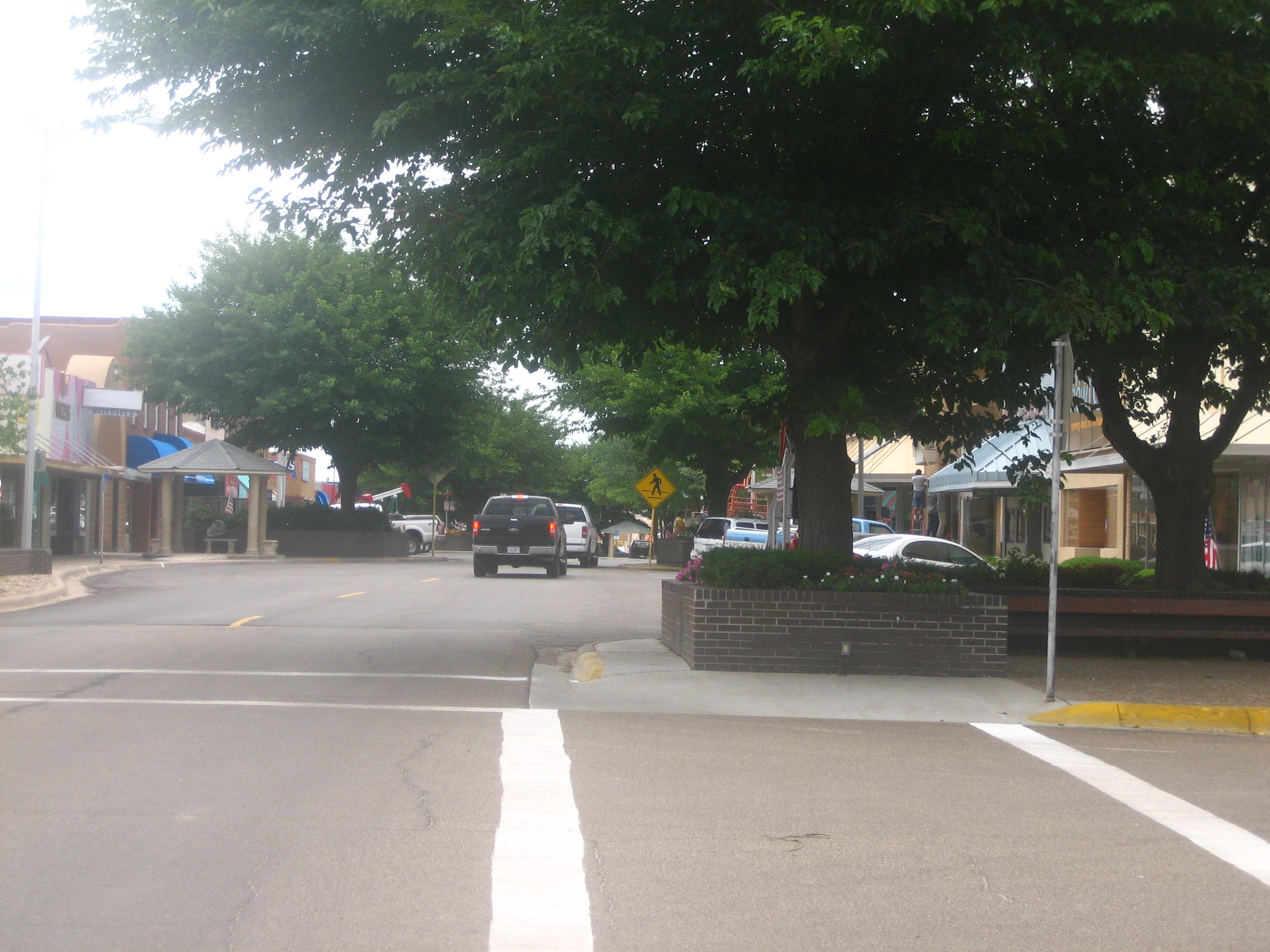
- Downtown Borger
- Nicknames: Smokey City, The Dirty B, Brick Town, Booger Town, B-Town, Boomtown
- Interactive map of Borger, Texas
- Coordinates: 35°39′33″N 101°24′06″W
- Country: United States
- State: Texas
- County: Hutchinson

Government
  - Mayor: Karen Felker

Area
  - Total: 8.80 sq mi (22.78 km^{2})
  - Land: 8.79 sq mi (22.76 km^{2})
  - Water: 0.0039 sq mi (0.01 km^{2})
- Elevation: 3,097 ft (944 m)

Population (2020)
  - Total: 12,551
  - Density: 1,412.7/sq mi (545.45/km^{2})
- Time zone: UTC−6 (Central (CST))
  - Summer (DST): UTC−5 (CDT)
- ZIP codes: 79007-79008
- Area code: 806
- FIPS code: 48-09556
- GNIS feature ID: 2409881
- Website: Borger, Texas

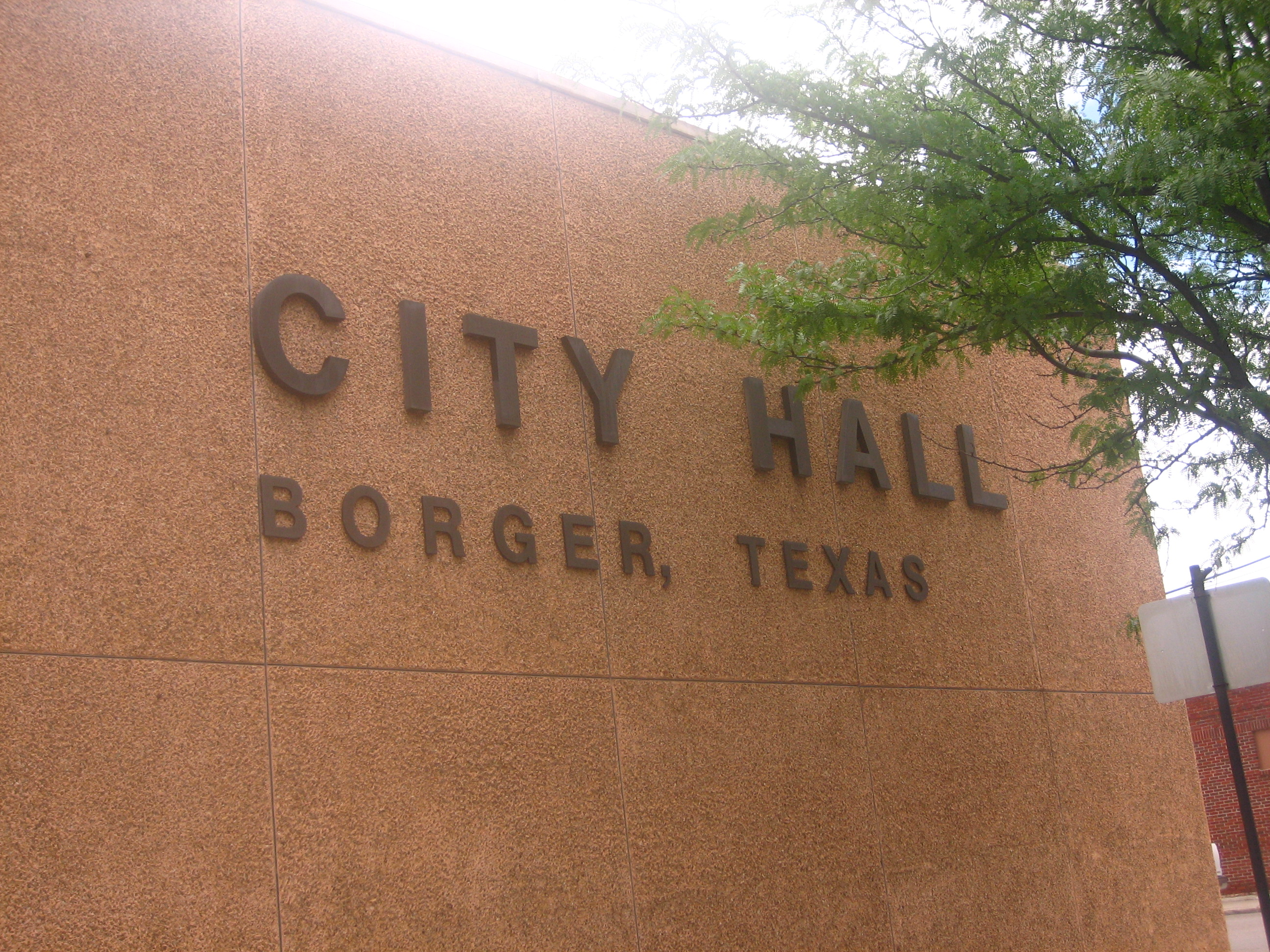
Borger City Hall

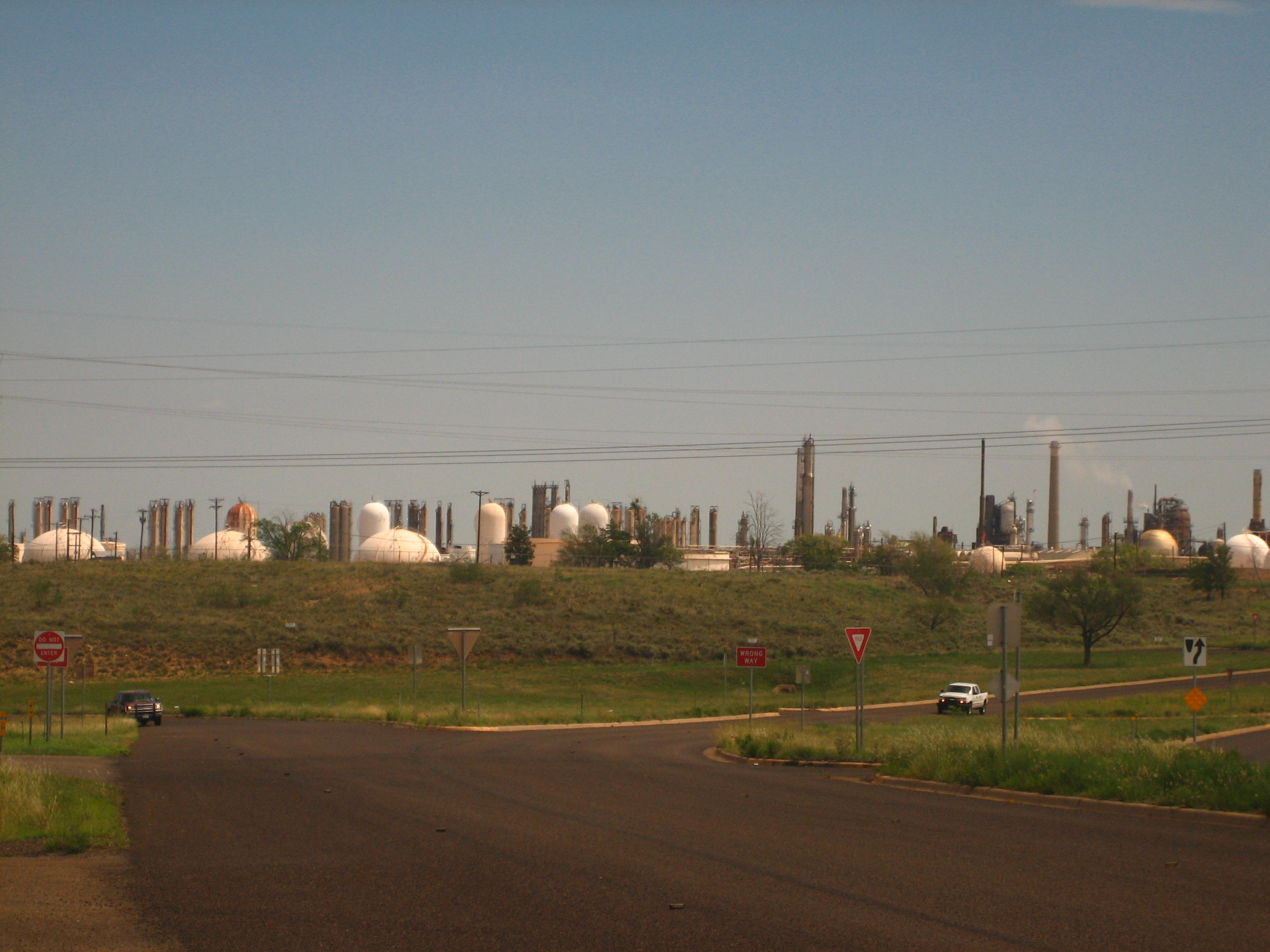
An oil refinery in Borger

Borger (/ˈbɔːrɡər/ BOR-gər) is the largest city in Hutchinson County, Texas, United States. The population was 12,551 at the 2020 census. Borger is named for businessman Asa Philip "Ace" Borger, who also established the Hutchinson County seat of Stinnett and several other small towns in Texas and Oklahoma.

== History ==
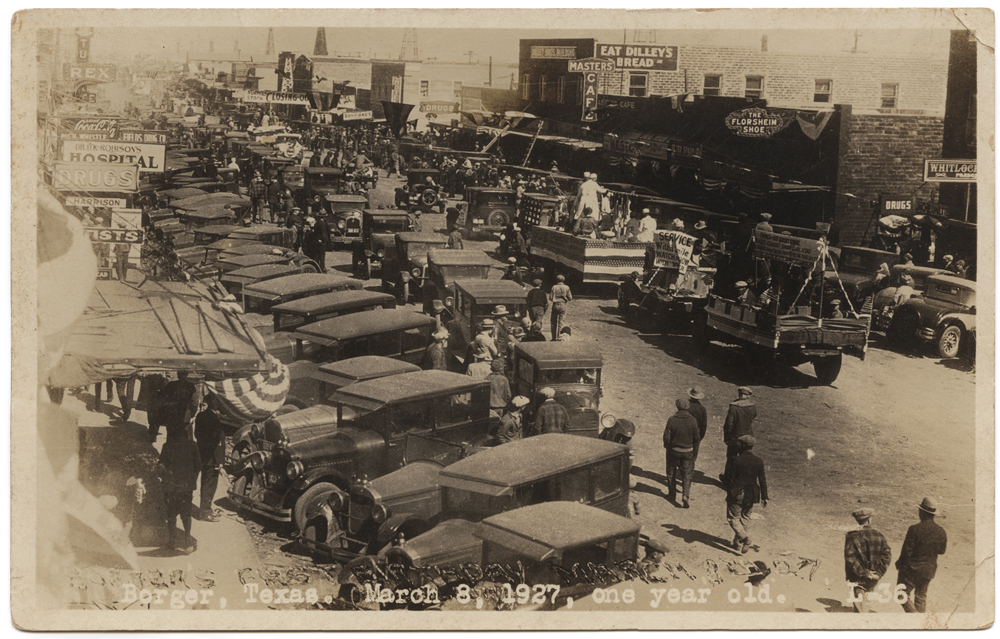
Borger, Texas in 1927: one year old

Ace Borger and his business partner John R. Miller purchased a 240-acre (0.97 km^{2}) townsite near the Canadian River in March 1926 after the discovery of oil in the vicinity. Within a few months, the boomtown had swollen to a population of 45,000, most lured by sensational advertising and "black gold". In October 1926, the city charter was adopted, and Miller was elected mayor. By this time, the Panhandle & Santa Fe Railway had completed the spur line to Borger, a post office had opened, and a school district was established. The boomtown of Borger soon had steam-generated electricity, telephone service, a hotel, and a jail. Regionalist artist Thomas Hart Benton depicted this period of Borger in his large painting Boomtown.

In the months that followed, oilmen, roughnecks, prospectors, panhandlers, and fortune seekers were joined by cardsharks, prostitutes, bootleggers, and drug dealers. The city became known as "Booger Town", as it attracted criminals and fugitives from the law. The town government soon fell under control of an organized crime syndicate led by Mayor Miller's shady associate, "Two-Gun Dick" Herwig. Dixon Street (now Tenth Street) was the "red-light" district, housing brothels, dance halls, speakeasies, and gambling dens. Murder and robbery became an everyday occurrence, and illegal moonshining and home brewing flourished under the fatherly watch of Herwig and his henchmen, including W. J. (Shine) Popejoy, the king of the Texas bootleggers. Borger became so notorious that in the spring of 1927, Texas Governor Dan Moody sent a force of Texas Rangers to rein in the town. The Texas Rangers were led by Captains Frank Hamer and Thomas R. Hickman. (Hamer would go on to later fame and even infamy as the man who killed Bonnie and Clyde.)

The Rangers did have a stabilizing effect. However, Borger still struggled with lawlessness and violence into the 1930s, which climaxed with the murder of District Attorney John A. Holmes by an assassin on September 18, 1929. This event caused Governor Moody to impose martial law for a month and send in state troops to help rid the town of its criminal element. Eventually, Borger settled down, but not before town founder Ace Borger was shot and killed at the post office by Arthur Huey on August 31, 1934. Huey was county treasurer and was irked at Ace Borger for not bailing him out of jail on an embezzlement charge. Huey shot Borger five times with a Colt .45 pistol, even pulling Borger's own pistol out of his clothing and shooting him again, along with others there in the post office.

By the late 1930s, Borger was pushed from one era to another by the Great Depression. Phillips Petroleum and others profited from the oil fields in the area, but during this time, the price of oil and gas dropped, ending the "boom" and the rapid growth of Borger. Carbon black plants added black soot to the Dust Bowl storms, covering the town in layers of dark grime. "Okie" migrants forced off their foreclosed farms back in Oklahoma found work in Borger plants and refineries. The Works Project Administration provided the town with new red-brick streets as the ramshackle shacks throughout town were replaced by more permanent buildings. During World War II, synthetic rubber and other petroleum products became important in the Borger area. By the 1960s, the Borger area was one of the largest producers of oil, carbon black, and petrochemicals and supplies in the state. The creation of nearby Lake Meredith also added to the town's economy as an important recreational area.

Today, Borger remains an important shipping point for agricultural produce, as well as for the petroleum products produced there. It is the home of the world's largest inland petrochemical complexes. Chevron-Phillips Chemical Company produces specialty chemicals. Solvay produces RYTON PPS plastics. Phillips 66 Petroleum Company processes crude oil and natural gas liquids. Agrium manufactures nitrogen fertilizer in its Borger plant. Borger also has Sid Richardson Carbon Company, which produces rubber-grade carbon black used to strengthen rubber tires, and Orion Engineered Carbons, Inc., which produces a variety of carbon blacks at its Borger facility. The original townsite is said to have been founded around 1898 by John F. Weatherly, a rancher who built a dugout and gave the future town the grandiose name of Granada. Weatherly's wife wanted it named after her former home—a town in West Virginia called Isom.

In 1900, Weatherly opened a store in his ranchhouse, which also became the first post office. Mrs. Weatherly opened a café and the community had a school opened by 1907. In October 1919, the mail was diverted through Plemons and the Isom post office closed.

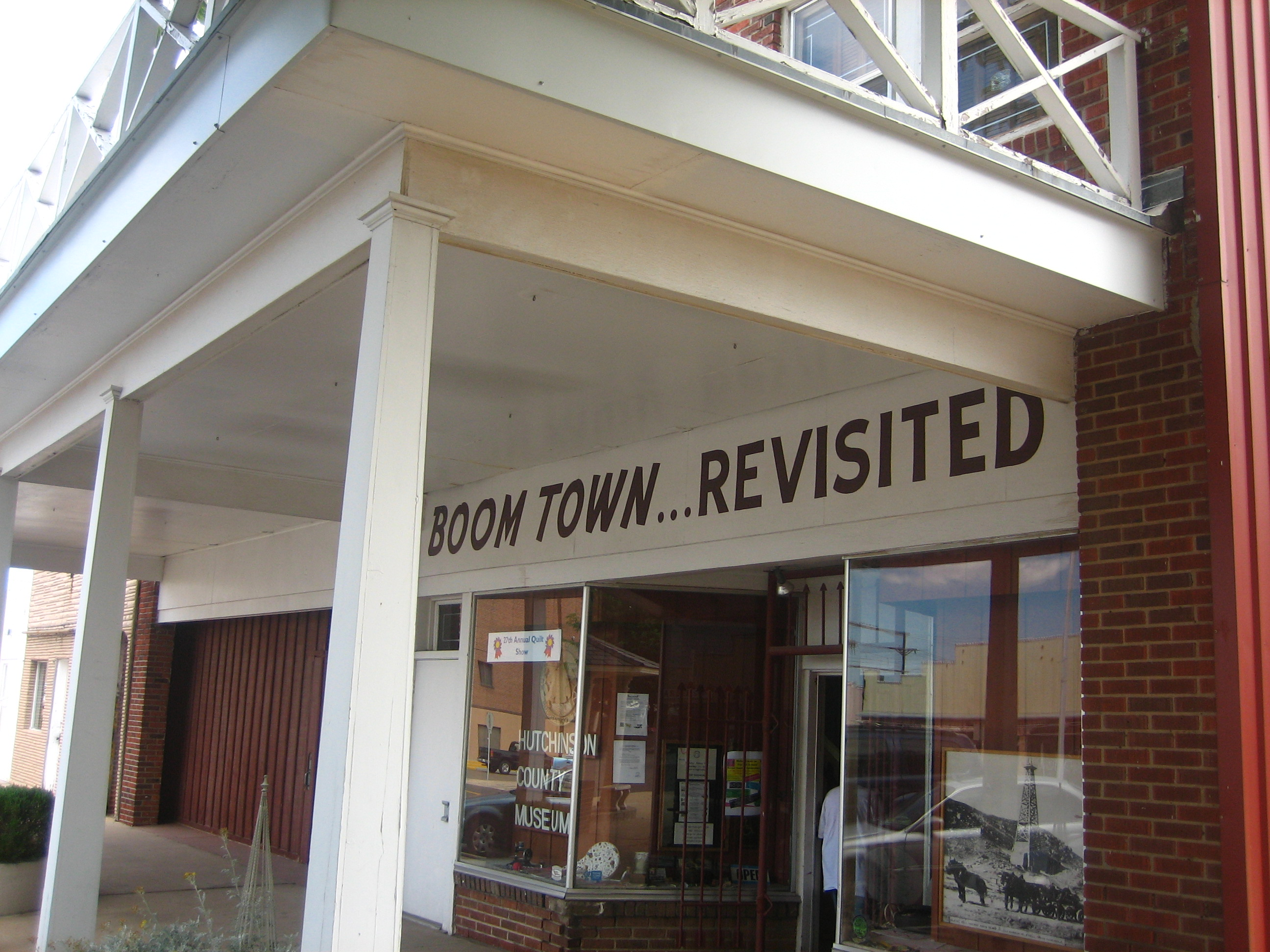
The Hutchinson County Historical Museum, also known as Boomtown Revisited, is located in downtown Borger.

The Weatherlys lost interest in the town they founded and moved to the nearby town of Panhandle in 1922, but they retained ownership of all that was Isom. When oil was discovered in early 1926, Weatherly returned and moved the town to the oilfield spur of the railroad near Borger.

Isom was platted with all lots south of First Street being Isom, Texas, and all streets north in Borger. From June to December 1926, the towns were rivals.

Although the town had a railroad depot, several oil-well supply warehouses, and no shortage of would-be citizens, a petition signed by 1,200 residents in early December declared Borger the winner. Isom's school merged with Borger's schools, driving the last stake into Isom.

The town has the dubious distinction of being the oldest of the townsites annexed by Borger.

During the winter of 1982–1983, Borger received a total of 58.7 inches of snow. This is the most snow that any Texas town has ever received during a winter season.

== Politics ==
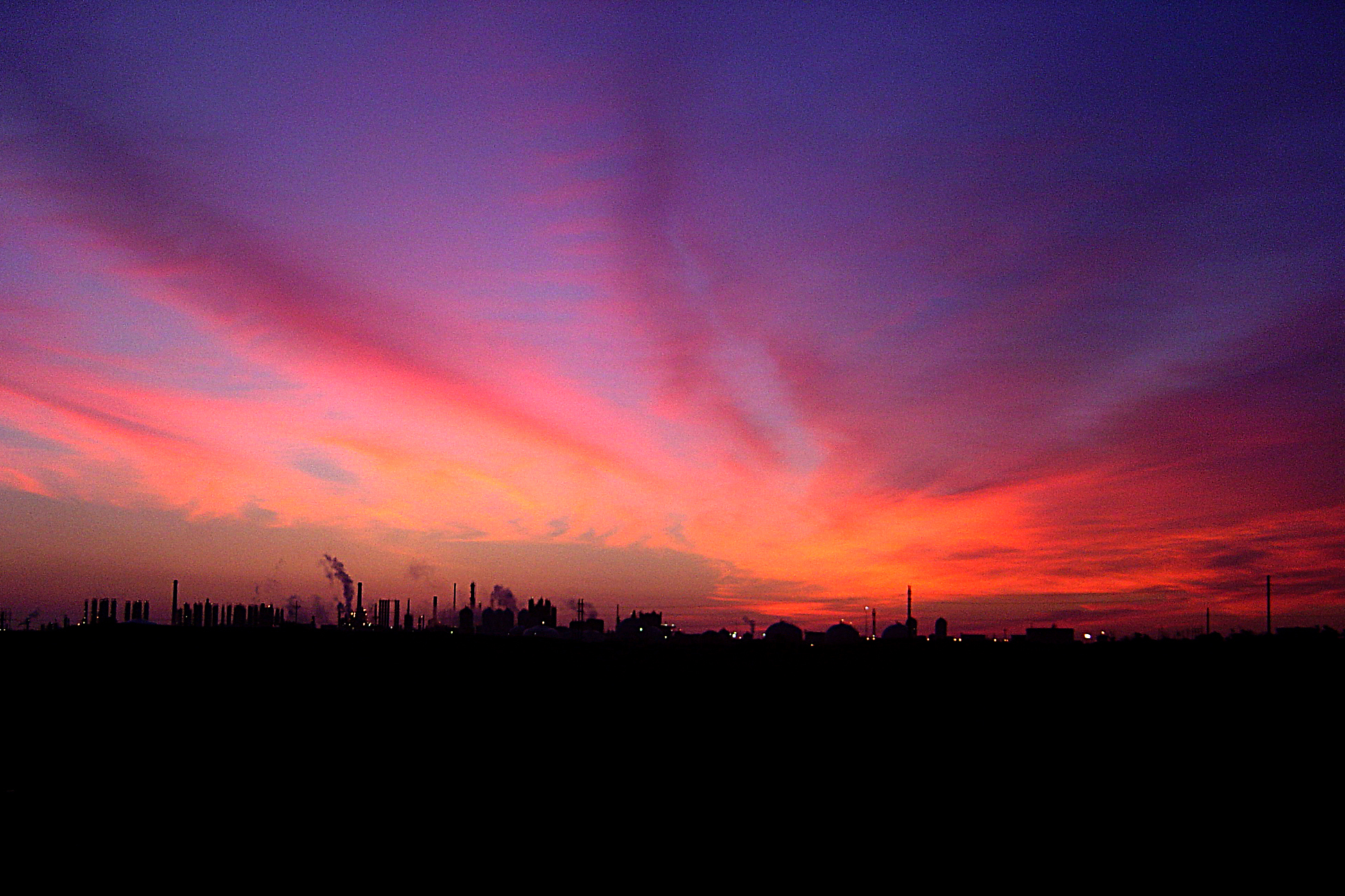
Refinery morning, 2004

Borger and Hutchinson County are among the strongest Republican voting districts in Texas and the nation, having cast GOP ballots at the presidential level in all elections for more than a half century. Even Barry M. Goldwater of Arizona, who received fewer votes nationally and in Texas versus native Texan Lyndon B. Johnson, won Hutchinson County, 5,358 to 4,625. In 1984, Ronald W. Reagan carried 9,078 votes in Hutchinson County to only 2,052 for the Democrat Walter F. Mondale of Minnesota. In 1996, Robert J. Dole of Kansas polled 6,350 votes in Hutchinson County to 2,553 for incumbent President Bill Clinton. H. Ross Perot, the Dallas industrialist, received 864 votes. The only Democrat since Lyndon Johnson to exceed 3,600 votes in Hutchinson County was Jimmy Carter in 1976, but Gerald R. Ford handily defeated him in the county.

In the 2008 presidential primaries, Hutchinson County cast 3,170 votes in the Republican race and 1,538 in the Democratic contest. In the United States Senate primary, 2,875 votes were cast in the Republican primary, largely for incumbent Senator John Cornyn, and 1,211 votes were cast in the Democratic portion of the ballot.

In the 2008 presidential election, Hutchinson County cast 7,361 votes for John McCain and 1,322 for Barack Obama.

== Geography and climate ==
According to the United States Census Bureau, Borger has a total land area of 8.77 square miles (22.7 km^{2}), of which 8.76 square miles (22.7 km^{2}) is land and 0.01 square miles (0.026 km^{2}) is water.

Climate data for Borger, Texas (Hutchinson County Airport), 1981–2010 normals, (Note: Mean monthly maxima and minima (i.e. the expected highest and lowest temperature readings at any point during the year or given month) calculated based on data at said location from 1981 to 2010.) extremes 1949–present (Note: Records maintained at a COOP station near downtown before June 1997, and at Hutchinson County Airport beginning June 1997.)
Month	Jan	Feb	Mar	Apr	May	Jun	Jul	Aug	Sep	Oct	Nov	Dec	Year
Record high °F (°C)	82 (28)	90 (32)	95 (35)	99 (37)	105 (41)	113 (45)	116 (47)	109 (43)	105 (41)	101 (38)	88 (31)	82 (28)	116 (47)
Mean maximum °F (°C)	71.4 (21.9)	76.4 (24.7)	83.6 (28.7)	89.6 (32.0)	95.1 (35.1)	100.8 (38.2)	102.1 (38.9)	100.4 (38.0)	96.4 (35.8)	89.7 (32.1)	79.8 (26.6)	71.3 (21.8)	103.9 (39.9)
Mean daily maximum °F (°C)	51.3 (10.7)	54.8 (12.7)	62.9 (17.2)	72.5 (22.5)	80.8 (27.1)	89.4 (31.9)	94.1 (34.5)	92.2 (33.4)	83.9 (28.8)	72.9 (22.7)	61.3 (16.3)	50.3 (10.2)	72.3 (22.4)
Mean daily minimum °F (°C)	26.1 (−3.3)	29.4 (−1.4)	36.3 (2.4)	44.9 (7.2)	55.2 (12.9)	64.3 (17.9)	69.8 (21.0)	68.0 (20.0)	60.0 (15.6)	47.9 (8.8)	35.9 (2.2)	26.8 (−2.9)	47.1 (8.4)
Mean minimum °F (°C)	9.0 (−12.8)	10.5 (−11.9)	18.1 (−7.7)	29.0 (−1.7)	39.3 (4.1)	51.5 (10.8)	60.0 (15.6)	58.2 (14.6)	43.2 (6.2)	30.9 (−0.6)	17.8 (−7.9)	8.4 (−13.1)	1.2 (−17.1)
Record low °F (°C)	−11 (−24)	−12 (−24)	1 (−17)	16 (−9)	29 (−2)	44 (7)	52 (11)	50 (10)	29 (−2)	13 (−11)	2 (−17)	−7 (−22)	−12 (−24)
Average precipitation inches (mm)	0.59 (15)	0.62 (16)	1.41 (36)	1.54 (39)	2.89 (73)	3.17 (81)	2.62 (67)	3.17 (81)	2.38 (60)	1.72 (44)	0.84 (21)	0.77 (20)	21.72 (552)
Average snowfall inches (cm)	4.8 (12)	4.1 (10)	3.5 (8.9)	0.9 (2.3)	0 (0)	0 (0)	0 (0)	0 (0)	0 (0)	0.2 (0.51)	2.1 (5.3)	4.7 (12)	20.3 (52)
Average precipitation days (≥ 0.01 in)	3.0	4.2	5.9	5.6	7.4	8.0	6.6	8.3	5.8	5.4	4.1	4.3	68.6
Average snowy days (≥ 0.1 in)	2.3	2.3	1.7	0.5	0	0	0	0	0	0.2	1.2	3.0	11.2
Source: NOAA (snow and precipitation day normals at Borger COOP35°40′08″N 101°24′08″W)

== Demographics ==
Historical population
Census	Pop.	Note	%±
1930	6,532		—
1940	10,018		53.4%
1950	18,059		80.3%
1960	20,911		15.8%
1970	14,195		−32.1%
1980	15,837		11.6%
1990	15,675		−1.0%
2000	14,302		−8.8%
2010	13,251		−7.3%
2020	12,551		−5.3%
U.S. Decennial Census

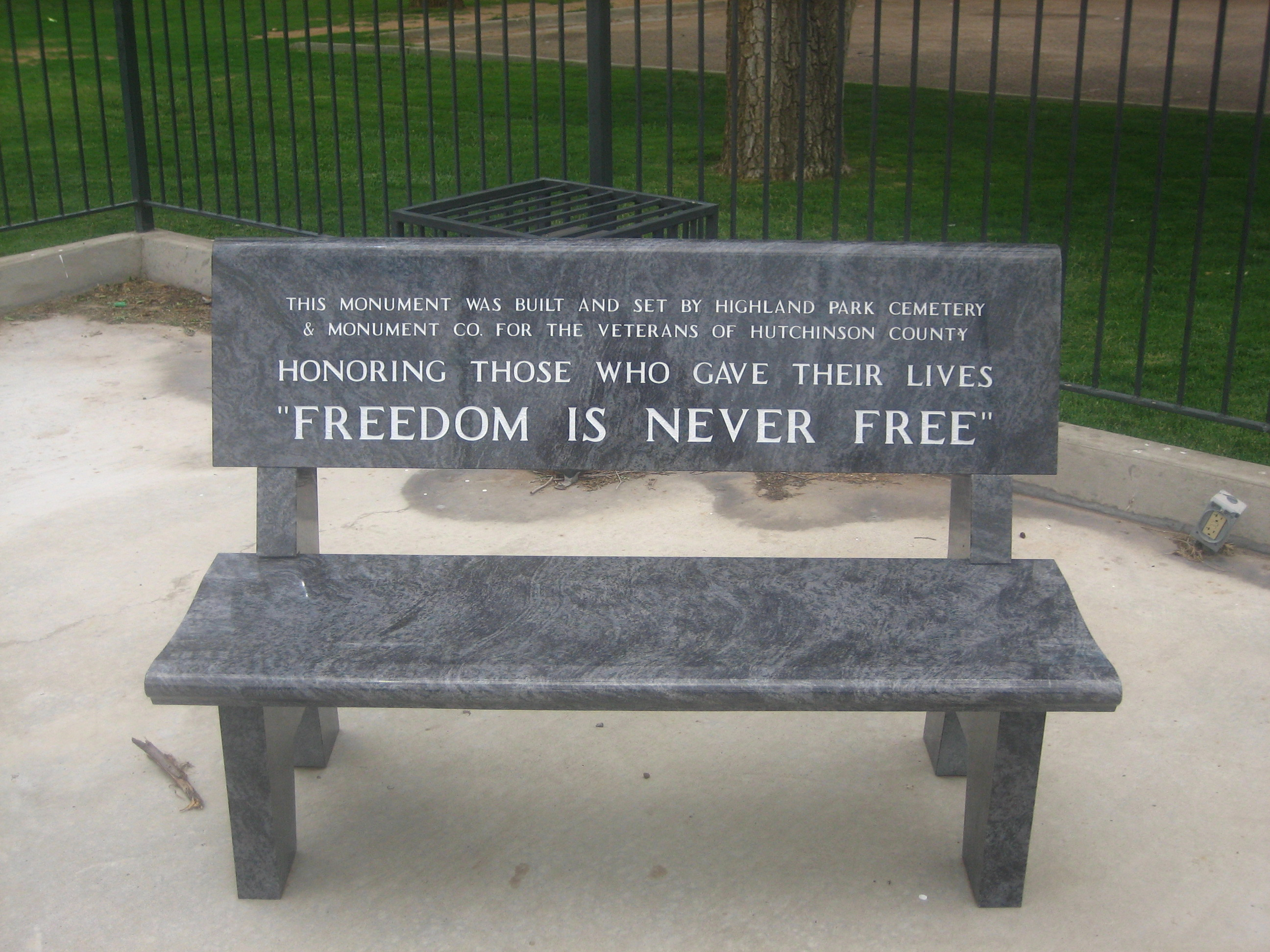
"Freedom Is Never Free" says the bench at the Borger Veterans Monument.

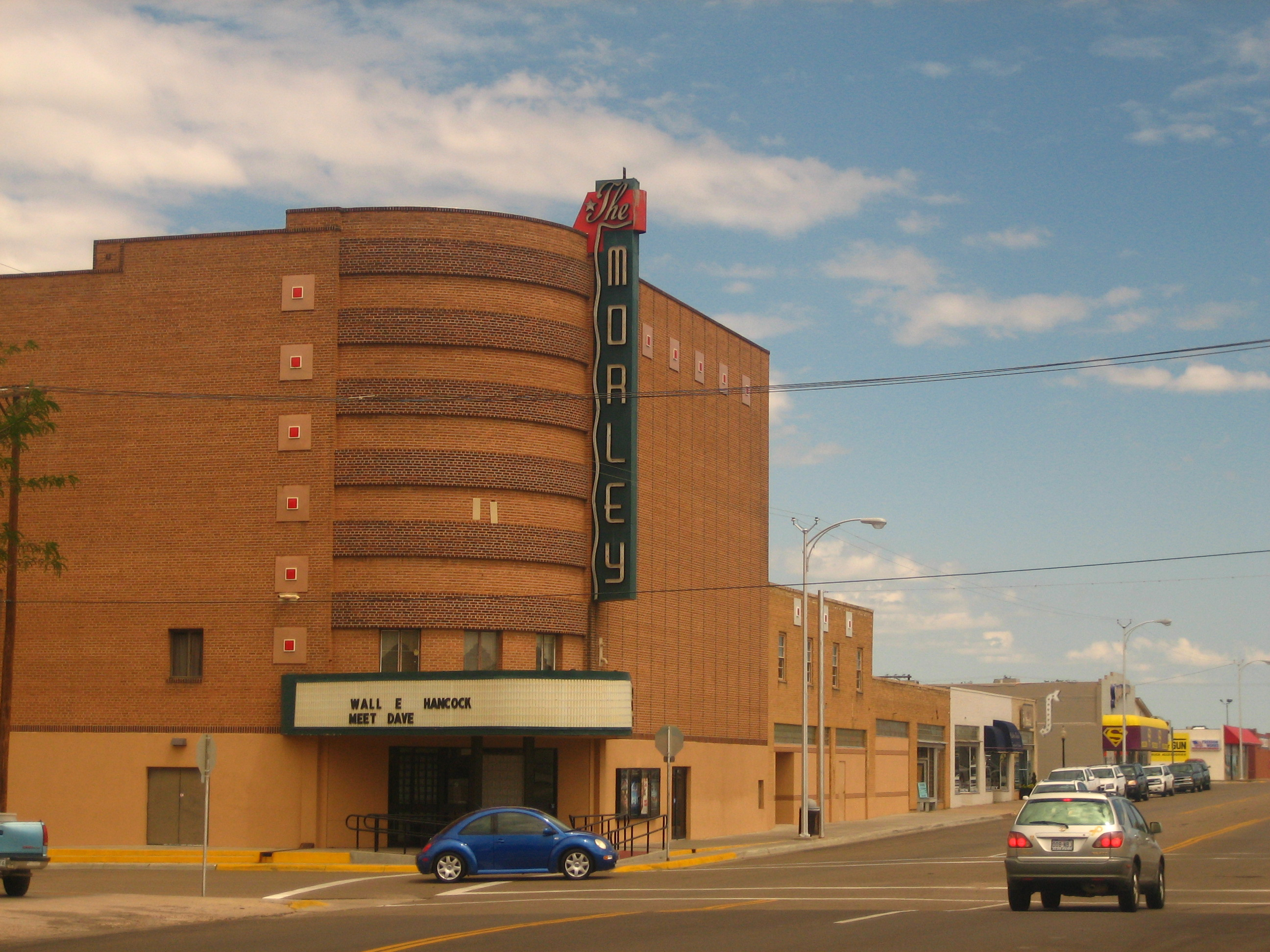
The Morley Theater in downtown Borger

=== 2020 census ===
As of the 2020 census, Borger had a population of 12,551, a median age of 36.3 years, 26.9% of residents under the age of 18, and 15.8% of residents aged 65 or older; there were 2,746 families, and for every 100 females there were 95.2 males and for every 100 females age 18 and over there were 93.5 males age 18 and over.

98.3% of residents lived in urban areas, while 1.7% lived in rural areas.

There were 4,862 households in Borger, of which 35.1% had children under the age of 18 living in them. Of all households, 46.9% were married-couple households, 20.0% were households with a male householder and no spouse or partner present, and 26.5% were households with a female householder and no spouse or partner present. About 28.7% of all households were made up of individuals and 13.0% had someone living alone who was 65 years of age or older.

There were 6,143 housing units, of which 20.9% were vacant. Among occupied housing units, 71.0% were owner-occupied and 29.0% were renter-occupied. The homeowner vacancy rate was 3.5% and the rental vacancy rate was 24.0%.

Racial composition as of the 2020 census
Race	Percent
White	67.4%
Black or African American	3.4%
American Indian and Alaska Native	2.0%
Asian	0.7%
Native Hawaiian and Other Pacific Islander	<0.1%
Some other race	14.3%
Two or more races	12.3%
Hispanic or Latino (of any race)	32.1%

=== 2010 census ===
As of the census of 2010, 13,251 people, 5,591 households, and 3,997 families resided in the city. The population density was 1,637.9 inhabitants per square mile (632.4/km^{2}). The 6,462 housing units averaged 740.1 per square mile (285.8/km^{2}). The racial makeup of the city was 80.6% White, 3.6% African American, 1.7% Native American, 0.43% Asian, 0.03% Pacific Islander, 9.36% from other races, and 2.44% from two or more races. Hispanics or Latinos of any race were 19.70% of the population.

Of the 5,591 households, 34.9% had children under the age of 18 living with them, 57.9% were married couples living together, 10.0% had a female householder with no husband present, and 28.5% were not families. About 26.5% of all households were made up of individuals, and 13.2% had someone living alone who was 65 years of age or older. The average household size was 2.52 and the average family size was 3.204.

In the city, the population was distributed as 27.8% under the age of 18, 9.8% from 18 to 24, 25.4% from 25 to 44, 20.9% from 45 to 64, and 16.1% who were 65 years of age or older. The median age was 36 years. For every 100 females, there were 95.3 males. For every 100 females age 18 and over, there were 91.2 males.

The median income for a household in the city was $34,653, and for a family was $40,417. Males had a median income of $39,207 versus $19,654 for females. The per capita income for the city was $16,869. About 9.7% of families and 12.0% of the population were below the poverty line, including 15.4% of those under age 18 and 6.3% of those age 65 or over.

== Entertainment ==
=== The Dome Civic and Convention Center ===
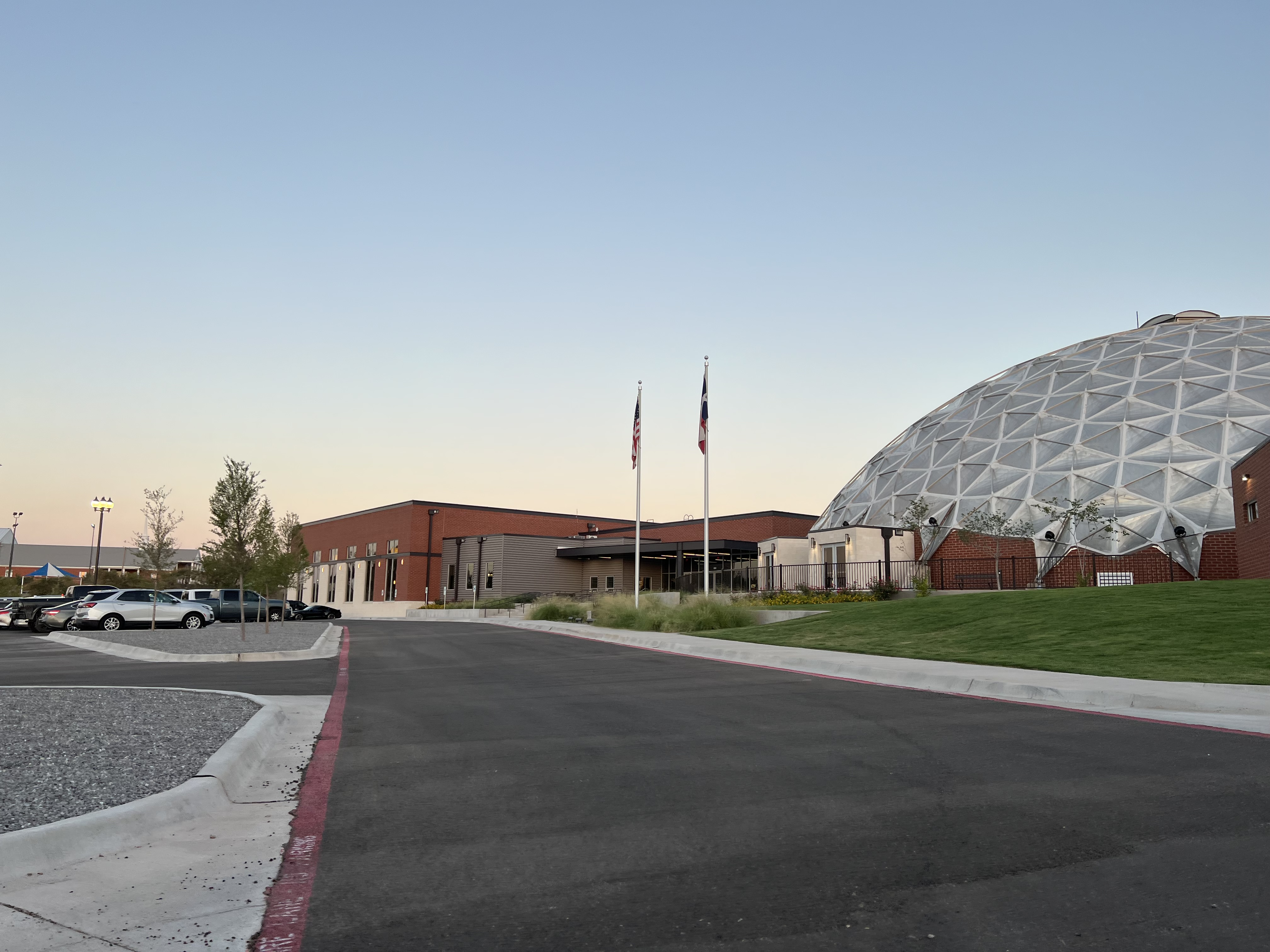
The Dome Civic and Convention Center, Borger, Texas, 2022

=== Movie theaters ===
- The Morley

=== Sports ===
Baseball

- Borger Gassers 1939–1942, 1946–1954 – West Texas–New Mexico League

== Education ==
Borger Independent School District includes almost all of the territory of the city, while a small portion lies in the Plemons-Stinnett-Phillips Consolidated Independent School District. Borger ISD has 2,800 students on six campuses (Paul Belton Early Childhood Center, Crockett and Gateway Elementary, Borger Intermediate School, Borger Middle School, and Borger High School). Cornerstone Christian Academy, also in Borger, operated as a private Christian school starting in 1990 but closed in the late 2010s. St. John the Evangelist Catholic Church operated a Catholic school for many years, but it has been closed since the early 1990s.

About 3,000 students in Borger attend the community college, Frank Phillips College (formerly Borger Junior College District). All of Hutchinson County and all of Borger ISD are a part of the college's attendance district.

== Notable people ==
- Donny Anderson, Texas Tech (All-American), NFL football player, halfback for the Green Bay Packers (born in Borger)
- Arian Archer, Miss Texas 1994, top 10 semi-finalist at Miss America 1995
- Tim Baker, Borger High School, Texas Tech, Pittsburgh Steelers, Carolina Panthers, San Diego Chargers
- Darlene Cates, actress
- Emy Coligado, actress
- Mike Conaway, member of the U.S. House of Representatives from Texas's 11th District (which does not include Borger)
- Bill Dees, musician and songwriter
- Stan Hansen, retired professional wrestler and WWE Hall of Fame inductee
- Tony Hillerman, author of the Navajo Mysteries, Borger News-Herald Reporter (1948)
- Danielle Jones, obstetrician-gynecologist, online personality, and medical science communicator focusing on reproductive and sexual health and science education
- Stormie Jones, world's first recipient of a successful simultaneous heart and liver organ transplant
- Joseph C. Krejci, scientist known for developing carbon black production processes
- John LaGrone, football player, Borger High School, SMU (All-American), Dave Campbell's Texas Football and DT, Edmonton Eskimos
- Gene Mayfield, coach of the Borger Bulldogs, West Texas State University
- Bill McKinney, football player, Borger High School, Chicago Bears
- G. William Miller, former chairman of the Federal Reserve Board and United States Secretary of the Treasury
- Gerald Myers, Texas Tech University basketball coach (1970–1991), athletic director
- Shanna Peeples, U.S. National Teacher of the Year, 2015
- Mike Rawlings, 61st mayor of Dallas
- Don Sahli, artist and painter
- Kel Seliger, member of the Texas State Senate from the 31st District
- Charlotte Mailliard Shultz, Chief of Protocol of State of California and City and County of San Francisco, Trustee San Francisco War Memorial and Performing Arts Center, widow of former Secretary of State George P. Shultz
- Matt Simon, Borger High School assistant coach, 1978
- Billy Sprague, Christian pop singer, songwriter, and producer
- David Wright, novelist
