= Donny Anderson =

American football player (born 1943)

No. 44
- Positions: Running back, punter

Personal information
- Born: May 16, 1943 (age 83); Borger, Texas, U.S.
- Listed height: 6 ft 2 in (1.88 m)
- Listed weight: 215 lb (98 kg)

Career information
- High school: West Texas (Texas)
- College: Texas Tech
- NFL draft: 1965: 1st round, 7th overall pick
- AFL draft: 1965: 1st round, 1st overall pick

Career history
- Green Bay Packers (1966–1971); St. Louis Cardinals (1972–1974); Miami Dolphins (1975)*
- * Offseason or practice squad member only

Awards and highlights
- 2× NFL champion (1966, 1967); 2× Super Bowl champion (I, II); Pro Bowl (1968); Green Bay Packers Hall of Fame; Sporting News Player of the Year (1965); Consensus All-American (1965); First-team All-American (1964); 3× First-team All-SWC (1963, 1964, 1965); Texas Tech Red Raiders No. 44 retired

Career NFL statistics
- Rushing yards: 4,696
- Rushing average: 3.9
- Receptions: 209
- Receiving yards: 2,548
- Total touchdowns: 56
- Punts: 387
- Punting yards: 15,326
- Stats at Pro Football Reference
- College Football Hall of Fame

Garry Don Anderson (born May 16, 1943) is an American former professional football player who was a halfback and punter for nine seasons with the Green Bay Packers and St. Louis Cardinals of the National Football League (NFL).

From Texas Tech (then Texas Technological College, now Texas Tech University), Anderson was the first-round draft pick of the Green Bay Packers in the 1965 NFL draft, the seventh overall selection. That year's draft included future hall-of-famers Dick Butkus, Gale Sayers, Joe Namath, and Fred Biletnikoff.

== Early life ==
Born in Borger, Texas, He was the son of John Washington Anderson and Ann Alycez (HIll) Anderson. Anderson grew up in Stinnett, seat of Hutchinson County in the Texas panhandle, and graduated from Stinnett High School in 1961. A talented multi-sport athlete, he was all-state in football and basketball, placed in the state track meet (hurdles and relay) and played baseball in the summer.

== College career ==
At Texas Tech in Lubbock, Anderson earned the nickname the "Golden Palomino". He received All-American honors twice (1964 and 1965) and was a three-time all-Southwest Conference halfback (1963–65). Anderson held many of Texas Tech's football records and finished fourth in the 1965 Heisman Trophy race. He is part of the Texas Tech Hall of Fame and the College Football Hall of Fame. Donny's Selective service Number was # 55 for the 1969 Vietnam Official Draft..

Because of a redshirt year due to academic issues, Anderson was eligible as underclassman for the 1965 NFL draft, then known as a "future" pick. In 1964, he ran for 966 yards with three touchdowns (TDs) and had 32 catches for 396 yards and four TDs; Despite being selected by the Packers, he returned for his senior season at Texas Tech in 1965 and led the Red Raiders to an 8–2 regular season and a berth in the Gator Bowl on the afternoon of New Year's Eve. As a senior, he ran for 705 yards with 10 TDs and had 60 catches for 797 yards and seven TDs.

Selected the outstanding player for Texas Tech in a 10-point loss to Georgia Tech, Anderson signed his professional football contract hours after the game. He selected the Packers over the reportedly higher offer from the Houston Oilers of the AFL. His contract was believed to be a then-record $600,000, exceeding Joe Namath's contract of the previous year.

== Professional career ==
Anderson began his NFL career in 1966 as #44 for the world-champion Packers. Fellow All-American Jim Grabowski, a fullback from Illinois, was the Packers' first pick in the 1966 NFL draft, and ninth overall. The well-paid pair were the projected successors of Paul Hornung and Jim Taylor, future hall of famers in their final seasons with Green Bay. The two rookies were on the College All-Star team that lost to the defending NFL champion Packers 38–0 on August 5 at Soldier Field in Chicago. They joined the Packers' training camp after the game, and were tabbed the "Gold Dust Twins."

Though he did not carry the ball often as a rookie, Anderson was part of a memorable play. During his second carry in the fourth quarter of Super Bowl I, Anderson's knee knocked out Chiefs defensive back Fred "The Hammer" Williamson, who had been boastful in pregame interviews. Williamson was carried off on a stretcher. Anderson also served as the team's return specialist that year, returning six punts for 124 yards and a touchdown, along with 23 kickoff returns for 533 yards.

In the following season, Anderson took on a far more prominent role in the Packers' offense, gaining 733 yards from scrimmage, catching 22 passes, and scoring nine touchdowns, while also gaining another 324 yards returning kicks. The Packers went on to a second consecutive championship win in Super Bowl II, where Anderson was the team's second leading rusher with 48 yards and a touchdown, while also catching two passes for 18 yards. He also punted the ball six times for 239 yards. One of his punts was fumbled, which the Packers recovered and were able to convert into a field goal just before the end of the first half.

After six seasons in Green Bay under three head coaches, Anderson was traded in February 1972 to the St. Louis Cardinals for MacArthur Lane. Anderson played through the 1974 season with the Cardinals, then was traded to the Miami Dolphins in the offseason. At age 32, he recognized that his prospects for playing time were low, and retired during training camp in mid-August 1975.

Anderson finished his career with 4,696 rushing yards, 209 receptions for 2,548 yards, 15 punt returns for 222 yards, and 34 kickoff returns for 759 yards. He scored 56 total touchdowns (41 rushing, 14 receiving, one punt return). He was inducted into the Green Bay Packers Hall of Fame in 1983.

=== Punter ===
While with the Packers under head coach Vince Lombardi, Anderson originated the concept of hang time in punting. Until Anderson, punters typically strove for maximum distance, with the NFL's leaders usually averaging 45 or more yards a punt. Punt returns varied, with an average of perhaps five yards per return. In 1967, the left-footed Anderson worked instead at punting the ball higher, shortening the distance traveled, but increasing the ball's time in the air, allowing better coverage by his team on the punt return. Green Bay punted 66 times that year, 63 of them by Anderson; opponents were able to return only 13 of them for a total of 22 yards, or about one-third yard (one foot) per punt.

Anderson had a total of 387 punts for 15,326 yards.

Lombardi explained the concept to sportswriters who questioned why he did not try to find a better punter than Anderson, who averaged only 36.6 yards per punt that year. Lombardi pointed out the lack of return yardage. Other punters soon followed Anderson, working for greater hang time. Eventually, the NFL changed its rules governing punt coverage, to increase the ability to return punts.

== NFL career statistics ==
Legend
	Won the Super Bowl
	Led the league
**Bold**	Career high

=== Regular season ===
Year	Team	Games		Rushing					Receiving				
Year	Team	GP	GS	Att	Yds	Avg	Lng	TD	Rec	Yds	Avg	Lng	TD
1966	GNB	14	0	25	104	4.2	15	2	2	33	16.5	22	0
1967	GNB	14	5	97	402	4.1	40	6	22	331	15.0	37	**3**
1968	GNB	14	14	170	761	**4.5**	42	5	25	333	13.3	47	1
1969	GNB	14	8	87	288	3.3	16	1	14	308	**22.0**	51	1
1970	GNB	14	14	**222**	**853**	3.8	**54**	5	36	**414**	11.5	34	0
1971	GNB	14	13	186	757	4.1	31	5	26	306	11.8	39	1
1972	STL	14	13	153	536	3.5	19	4	28	298	10.6	**56**	2
1973	STL	14	13	167	679	4.1	**54**	**10**	**41**	409	10.0	44	**3**
1974	STL	14	1	90	316	3.5	16	3	15	116	7.7	25	**3**
		126	81	1,197	4,696	3.9	54	41	209	2,548	12.2	56	14

=== Playoffs ===
Year	Team	Games		Rushing					Receiving				
Year	Team	GP	GS	Att	Yds	Avg	Lng	TD	Rec	Yds	Avg	Lng	TD
1966	GNB	2	0	4	30	**7.5**	13	0	0	0	0.0	0	0
1967	GNB	3	3	**44**	**135**	3.1	**18**	**1**	**8**	**92**	**11.5**	**25**	0
1974	STL	1	0	0	0	0.0	0	0	0	0	0.0	0	0
		6	3	48	165	3.4	18	1	8	92	11.5	25	0

== After football ==
Following his retirement from the NFL, Anderson spent nearly two decades on the celebrity golf tour. As of 2017, Anderson lives in the Dallas area and stays busy with 10 grandchildren and his Dallas-based foundation, Winners for Life, that helps send at-risk kids to college.
