= Plemons =

Plemons may refer to:

- Jesse Plemons (born 1988), American actor
- Plemons, Texas, a ghost town in Hutchinson County, in the U.S. state of Texas
