= Bill McKinney (American football) =

American football player (born 1945)

No. 54
- Position: Linebacker

Personal information
- Born: July 14, 1945 (age 81); Borger, Texas, U.S.
- Listed height: 6 ft 1 in (1.85 m)
- Listed weight: 226 lb (103 kg)

Career information
- High school: Borger
- College: West Texas A&M
- NFL draft: 1972: 16th round, 402nd overall pick

Career history
- Chicago Bears (1972)

Career NFL statistics
- Games played: 8
- Games started: 0
- Stats at Pro Football Reference

William Claude McKinney (born July 14, 1945) is an American former professional football player who was a linebacker in the National Football League (NFL) for the Chicago Bears. He played college football for the West Texas A&M Buffaloes and was selected 402nd overall in the 16th round of the 1972 NFL draft.
