= Hutchinson County, Texas =

County in Texas, United States

- County
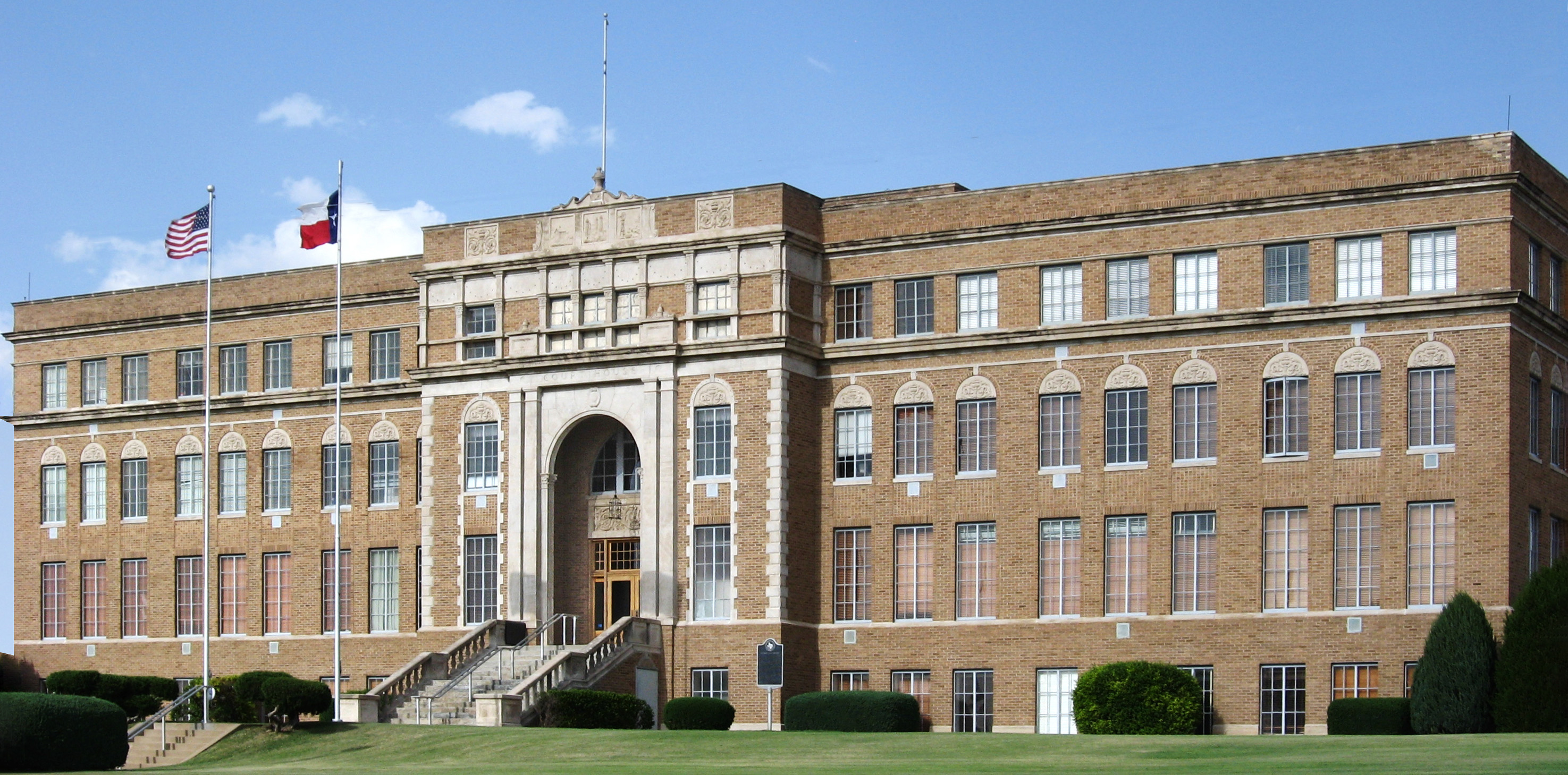
- The Hutchinson County Courthouse in Stinnett

- Location within the U.S. state of Texas
- Coordinates: 35°50′N 101°22′W
- Country: United States
- State: Texas
- Founded: 1901
- Seat: Stinnett
- Largest city: Borger

Area
  - Total: 895 sq mi (2,320 km^{2})
  - Land: 887 sq mi (2,300 km^{2})
  - Water: 7.5 sq mi (19 km^{2}) 0.8%

Population (2020)
  - Total: 20,617
  - Estimate (2025): 19,633 ▼
  - Density: 23.2/sq mi (8.97/km^{2})
- Time zone: UTC−6 (Central)
  - Summer (DST): UTC−5 (CDT)
- Congressional district: 13th
- Website: www.co.hutchinson.tx.us

Hutchinson County is a county in the U.S. state of Texas. As of the 2020 census, its population was 20,617. Its county seat is Stinnett. The county was created in 1876, but not organized until 1901. It is named for Andrew Hutchinson, an early Texas attorney.

Hutchinson County comprises the Borger, TX Micropolitan Statistical Area, which is also included in the Amarillo-Borger, TX Combined Statistical Area. It is located in the northern portion of the Texas Panhandle. The history of Hutchinson County is accented in downtown Borger in the Hutchinson County Historical Museum, also known as Boomtown Revisited. Hutchinson County is the county with the most ghost towns in the Texas Panhandle.

== History ==
=== Native Americans ===
Artifacts of the Antelope Creek Indian culture abound along the Canadian River valley in Hutchinson County. Archaeologists have found 1,300 acres (5.3 km^{2}) of Alibates flint in the area that was used as a quarry for shaping flint tools. Nomadic Plains Apache also camped in this area, as did Comanche, Arapaho, Kiowa, and Cheyenne.

Bent, St. Vrain and Company established a trading post in this area to tap into Indian trading. Known as Fort Adobe, it was blown up by traders three years later due to Indian depredations. The ruins became known as Adobe Walls.

The First Battle of Adobe Walls took place in 1864 when General James H. Carleton sent Colonel Kit Carson into the area to avenge for repeated Indian attacks. Carson and several hundred cavalry soldiers were greatly outnumbered by Kiowa and Comanche and forced to retreat. The Second Battle of Adobe Walls took place in 1874. A group of buffalo hunters attempted a revitalization of Fort Adobe. The Comanches, Cheyenne, Arapaho, and Kiowa saw the fort and the decimation of the buffalo herd as a threat to their existence. Comanche medicine man Isa-tai prophesied a victory and immunity to the white man's bullets in battle. Quanah Parker lead several hundred in a raid on the fort. The buffalo hunters were able to force the Indians into retreat.

=== Early explorations ===
In 1541, an expedition led by Francisco Vásquez de Coronado traversed the area on its Great Plains quest for Quivira on the search for the mythical Seven Cities of Gold. Spanish conquistador Juan de Oñate passed through in 1601 on his Kansas expedition. Buffalo hunters and Comanchero from New Mexico hunted and traded in the vicinity until the 1870s. The first Anglo-American expedition to come through the county was led by Stephen H. Long, who mistook the Canadian River for the Red River, in August 1820. Josiah Gregg brought his Santa Fe caravan through in March 1840. During the month of December 1858, Lt. Edward Beale with 100 men passed through the county constructing a federally funded military road, the first to be constructed in the American Southwest. The road went from Fort Smith, Arkansas, to Los Angeles. It was named the Beale Wagon Road by Secretary of War John B. Floyd.

=== Early ranch entrepreneurs ===
In November 1876, Kansan Thomas Sherman Bugbee established the Quarter Circle T Ranch. The Scissors Ranch was begun in 1878 by William E. Anderson at the Adobe Walls site. The ranch was named after the brand, which looked like a pair of scissors. Coloradan Richard E. McNalty moved to Texas and began the Turkey Track Ranch, which he sold to Charles Wood and Jack Snider in 1881. Scotland-born James M. Coburn formed the Hansford Land and Cattle Company. The Quarter Circle T Ranch and Scissors Ranch were sold to Coburn in 1882. Coburn acquired the Turkey Track Ranch in 1883.

=== County established ===
Hutchinson County was established in 1876. The county was not organized until 1901, when Plemons became the county seat. For the next four decades, ranching dominated the county's economy, while crop cultivation made gradual headway.

The Panhandle oilfield was discovered in the 1920s. On June 1, 1923, the Sanford No. 1 J. C. Whittington well in southwestern Hutchinson County reached a depth of 3,077 feet (938 m) and found flowing oil. Towns sprang up in response. The population mushroomed from 721 in 1920 to 14,848 in 1930 as a result of the oil boom. By 1990, 526,670,107 barrels (83,733,855.6 m^{3}) of oil had been taken from Hutchinson County lands since 1923.

Stinnett became the county seat after a special election on September 18, 1926.

== Geography ==
According to the U.S. Census Bureau, the county has a total area of 895 square miles (2,320 km^{2}), of which 887 square miles (2,300 km^{2}) are land and 7.5 square miles (19 km^{2}) (0.8%) are covered by water.

=== Major highways ===
- State Highway 136
- State Highway 152
- State Highway 207
- Spur 119
- Spur 140
- Spur 245
- Spur 246

=== Adjacent counties ===
- Hansford County (north)
- Roberts County (east)
- Carson County (south)
- Moore County (west)
- Potter County (southwest)
- Gray County (southeast)
- Sherman County (northwest)
- Ochiltree County (northeast)

=== National protected area ===
- Lake Meredith National Recreation Area (part)

== Demographics ==
Historical population
Census	Pop.	Note	%±
1880	50		—
1890	58		16.0%
1900	303		422.4%
1910	892		194.4%
1920	721		−19.2%
1930	14,848		1,959.4%
1940	19,069		28.4%
1950	31,580		65.6%
1960	34,419		9.0%
1970	24,443		−29.0%
1980	26,304		7.6%
1990	25,689		−2.3%
2000	23,857		−7.1%
2010	22,150		−7.2%
2020	20,617		−6.9%
2025 (est.)	19,633	▼	−4.8%
U.S. Decennial Census; 1850–1900 1910; 1920 1930 1940; 1950 1960 1970; 1980 1990 2000; 2010 2020

=== Racial and ethnic composition ===
Hutchinson County, Texas – Racial and ethnic composition Note: the US Census treats Hispanic/Latino as an ethnic category. This table excludes Latinos from the racial categories and assigns them to a separate category. Hispanics/Latinos may be of any race.
Race / Ethnicity (NH = Non-Hispanic)	Pop 2000	Pop 2010	Pop 2020	% 2000	% 2010	% 2020
White alone (NH)	19,104	16,482	13,783	80.08%	74.41%	66.85%
Black or African American alone (NH)	563	512	416	2.36%	2.31%	2.02%
Native American or Alaska Native alone (NH)	289	300	273	1.21%	1.35%	1.32%
Asian alone (NH)	83	91	105	0.35%	0.41%	0.51%
Pacific Islander alone (NH)	4	3	2	0.02%	0.01%	0.01%
Other race alone (NH)	5	23	52	0.02%	0.10%	0.25%
Mixed race or Multiracial (NH)	303	353	1,025	1.27%	1.59%	4.97%
Hispanic or Latino (any race)	3,506	4,386	4,961	14.70%	19.80%	24.06%
Total	23,857	22,150	20,617	100.00%	100.00%	100.00%

=== 2020 census ===
As of the 2020 census, the county had a population of 20,617. The median age was 39.0 years. 25.2% of residents were under the age of 18 and 17.9% of residents were 65 years of age or older. For every 100 females there were 98.8 males, and for every 100 females age 18 and over there were 97.9 males age 18 and over.

The racial makeup of the county was 74.1% White, 2.3% Black or African American, 1.9% American Indian and Alaska Native, 0.5% Asian, <0.1% Native Hawaiian and Pacific Islander, 10.0% from some other race, and 11.2% from two or more races. Hispanic or Latino residents of any race comprised 24.1% of the population.

62.3% of residents lived in urban areas, while 37.7% lived in rural areas.

There were 8,171 households in the county, of which 32.4% had children under the age of 18 living in them. Of all households, 50.8% were married-couple households, 19.6% were households with a male householder and no spouse or partner present, and 24.0% were households with a female householder and no spouse or partner present. About 27.6% of all households were made up of individuals and 12.8% had someone living alone who was 65 years of age or older.

There were 10,166 housing units, of which 19.6% were vacant. Among occupied housing units, 76.7% were owner-occupied and 23.3% were renter-occupied. The homeowner vacancy rate was 3.5% and the rental vacancy rate was 21.8%.

=== 2000 census ===
As of the 2000 census, 23,857 people, 9,283 households, and 6,869 families resided in the county. The population density was 27 people per square mile (10 people/km^{2}). The 10,871 housing units averaged 12 units per square mile (4.6/km^{2}). The racial makeup of the county was 87.00% White, 2.41% Black or African American, 1.35% Native American, 0.35% Asian, 0.02% Pacific Islander, 6.66% from other races, and 2.21% from two or more races. About 14.70% of the population was Hispanic or Latino of any race.

Of the 9,283 households, 34.80% had children under the age of 18 living with them, 61.40% were married couples living together, 9.10% had a female householder with no husband present, and 26.00% were not families. About 23.90% of all households were made up of individuals, and 11.90% had someone living alone who was 65 years of age or older. The average household size was 2.54 and the average family size was 3.00.

In the county, the population was distributed as 27.40% under the age of 18, 8.70% from 18 to 24, 25.50% from 25 to 44, 22.70% from 45 to 64, and 15.60% who were 65 years of age or older. The median age was 38 years. For every 100 females, there were 97.00 males. For every 100 females age 18 and over, there were 93.60 males.

The median income for a household in the county was $36,588, and for a family was $42,500. Males had a median income of $40,029 versus $19,952 for females. The per capita income for the county was $17,317. About 8.80% of families and 11.10% of the population were below the poverty line, including 14.70% of those under age 18 and 7.30% of those age 65 or over.

== Communities ==
=== Cities ===
- Borger
- Fritch (small part in Moore County)
- Stinnett (county seat)

=== Town ===
- Sanford

=== Census-designated place ===
- Lake Meredith Estates

=== Unincorporated community ===
- Pringle

=== Ghost towns ===
- Adobe Walls
- Phillips
- Plemons
- Whittenburg

== Education ==
School districts include:

- Borger Independent School District
- Plemons-Stinnett-Phillips Consolidated Independent School District
- Pringle-Morse Consolidated Independent School District
- Sanford-Fritch Independent School District
- Spearman Independent School District

All of Hutchinson County and all of Borger ISD are a part of the attendance district of Frank Phillips College (formerly Borger Junior College District), a community college.

Spring Creek Independent School District consolidated into Borger ISD effective July 1, 2024.

== Notable people ==
- Donny Anderson, Green Bay Packers football player
- Mary Castle, actress
- Billy Dixon, Indian scout, Medal of Honor winner, and sheriff of Hutchinson County
- G. William Miller, former United States Secretary of the Treasury and chairman of the Federal Reserve Board
- Ron White, comedian, most noted for his work with the Blue Collar Comedy Tour

== Politics ==
Hutchinson County is located within District 87 of the Texas House of Representatives. Hutchison County is located within District 31 of the Texas Senate.

United States presidential election results for Hutchinson County, Texas
Year	Republican		Democratic		Third party(ies)	
Year	No.	%	No.	%	No.	%
1912	16	17.20%	71	76.34%	6	6.45%
1916	28	18.54%	114	75.50%	9	5.96%
1920	106	42.91%	135	54.66%	6	2.43%
1924	69	29.49%	159	67.95%	6	2.56%
1928	1,115	60.43%	730	39.57%	0	0.00%
1932	505	20.14%	1,976	78.79%	27	1.08%
1936	390	13.57%	2,478	86.25%	5	0.17%
1940	1,101	26.67%	3,019	73.12%	9	0.22%
1944	864	22.58%	2,760	72.14%	202	5.28%
1948	1,382	23.00%	4,527	75.34%	100	1.66%
1952	5,369	51.30%	5,083	48.57%	13	0.12%
1956	5,110	54.73%	4,184	44.82%	42	0.45%
1960	6,432	65.99%	3,295	33.81%	20	0.21%
1964	5,358	53.58%	4,625	46.25%	17	0.17%
1968	4,813	47.43%	2,416	23.81%	2,919	28.76%
1972	7,411	81.25%	1,405	15.40%	305	3.34%
1976	6,137	61.78%	3,691	37.16%	105	1.06%
1980	7,439	69.97%	2,935	27.61%	258	2.43%
1984	9,078	81.26%	2,052	18.37%	41	0.37%
1988	7,526	71.50%	2,950	28.03%	50	0.48%
1992	6,034	55.42%	2,833	26.02%	2,021	18.56%
1996	6,350	64.78%	2,553	26.04%	900	9.18%
2000	7,443	79.60%	1,796	19.21%	112	1.20%
2004	7,839	83.67%	1,503	16.04%	27	0.29%
2008	7,361	84.02%	1,322	15.09%	78	0.89%
2012	6,804	85.82%	1,045	13.18%	79	1.00%
2016	7,042	86.35%	854	10.47%	259	3.18%
2020	7,681	87.43%	965	10.98%	139	1.58%
2024	7,273	88.22%	913	11.07%	58	0.70%

United States Senate election results for Hutchinson County, Texas1
Year	Republican		Democratic		Third party(ies)	
Year	No.	%	No.	%	No.	%
2024	7,047	86.28%	946	11.58%	175	2.14%

United States Senate election results for Hutchinson County, Texas2
Year	Republican		Democratic		Third party(ies)	
Year	No.	%	No.	%	No.	%
2020	7,575	87.14%	900	10.35%	218	2.51%

Texas Gubernatorial election results for Hutchinson County
Year	Republican		Democratic		Third party(ies)	
Year	No.	%	No.	%	No.	%
2022	5,437	89.69%	540	8.91%	85	1.40%

== See also ==
- List of museums in the Texas Panhandle
- National Register of Historic Places listings in Hutchinson County, Texas
- Recorded Texas Historic Landmarks in Hutchinson County
