= Adobe Walls, Texas =

Ghost town in Texas, United States

- Adobe Walls
- U.S. National Register of Historic Places
- Location within Texas Location within the United States
- Location: Address restricted
- Nearest city: Stinnett, Texas
- Area: 2 acres (0.81 ha)
- Built: 1843
- NRHP reference No.: 78002958
- Added to NRHP: May 22, 1978

Adobe Walls is a ghost town in Hutchinson County, 17 miles (27 km) northeast of Stinnett, in the U.S. state of Texas. It was established in 1843 as a trading post for buffalo hunters and local Native American trade in the vicinity of the Canadian River. It later became a ranching community. Historically, Adobe Walls is the site of two battles between Native Americans and settlers. In the November 1864 First Battle of Adobe Walls, Native Americans successfully repelled attacking troops led by Kit Carson. Ten years later, on June 27, 1874, known as the Second Battle of Adobe Walls, civilians at the Adobe Walls trading post successfully fought off an attack by a war party composed primarily of Comanche and Cheyenne warriors led by the Comanche chief Quanah Parker. The second battle led to a military campaign, which resulted in Indian relocation to Indian Territory.

On May 22, 1978, the Adobe Walls site was added to the National Register of Historic Places in Texas, and in 1979 recognized as a Texas state archeological landmark.

== Establishment ==
As early as 1835, the trading firm Bent, St. Vrain & Company, housed in teepees and temporary log cabins, established seasonal trade with Native Americans. In 1843, the company established a log structure trading site on what is now known as Bent Creek in Hutchinson County. In 1845, they replaced the log structure with an adobe brick, single-entrance fort spanning 80 feet (24m) square, with walls that rose 9 feet (2.7 m). The fort was closed in 1848, due to Indian depredations. The last trading trip sponsored by the company was held in the winter of 1848, and in the spring of 1849, William Bent found part of his livestock slaughtered by local Indians. In response, he blew up the remains of the interior of the fort and departed the Panhandle of Texas.

By the time of the battles decades later, the adobe structure was permanently abandoned, leaving only crumbling adobe walls. In 1874, a new complex was erected north of the ruins by traders from Kansas. About a mile north of the Fort Adobe ruins, the Myers and Leonard store was created by merchants from Kansas after the destruction of the adobe walls in March 1874.

"Bent's Creek, west of the Walls, flowed from the northwest in a southeasterly direction to the Canadian, passing close to the ruins of old Adobe Walls, about a mile and a quarter south of the new Adobe Walls...East of Adobe Walls lay the open valley of Adobe Walls Creek, terminating in a growth of willows, cottonwoods, hackberry, chinaberry, and stunted elms that fringed this stream...".

Dixon described the 1874 establishment: "All the buildings at Adobe Walls faced to the east, the main ones standing in a row. On the south was the store of Rath & Wright, with a great pile of buffalo hides at the rear. Then came Hanrahan's saloon, and fifty yards [46 m] or so north of the latter was the store of Leonard & Myers, the building forming the northeast corner of the big picket stockade. In the southwest corner of the stockade was a mess house and the store, as well. The blacksmith's shop was located just north of Hanrahan's saloon. The adobe walls of the main buildings were about two feet [0.61 m] thick."

== The battles of Adobe Walls ==
=== First battle ===
The First Battle of Adobe Walls occurred November 1864 between a force of Kiowa, Comanche and Plains Apache and an attacking presence of 372 U.S. Army troops under the command of Kit Carson. The Battle was intended to end the Native American raids on wagon trains traveling on the Great Plains. The American force was pushed to retreat, yet both the U.S. Army and the Kiowa declared themselves the victor.

=== Second battle ===
The Second Battle of Adobe Wall occurred on June 27, 1874, between a group of 28 buffalo hunters and a Comanche force of 700, led by Isa-tai and Quanah Parker. This battle was the result of buffalo hunters encroaching on Native American territory dictated by the 1867 Medicine Lodge Treaty, and angering the Natives. The Native Americans were forced back after an assault on the trading post led by Isa-tai and Quanah Parker.

== Post-battle era ==
Following the First and Second Battles of Adobe Walls, the buffalo hunters worked on repairing the forts as the U.S. Army slowly evacuated them. By early September 7, 1874, all of the hunters and civilians were removed by the U.S. Army. The repaired fort was attacked and burned by Native Americans towards late September, leaving only the adobe walls behind. Following the battles and the Indian relocation, buffalo hunters still came, but the herds had thinned. The Turkey Track Ranch was established, but the population of the area remained sparse. In 1877, a store was reopened within the area, despite human remains left scattered on the battlefields.

In 1883, civilian Medal of Honor recipient Billy Dixon (1850–1913) was hired on at the Turkey Track Ranch. He filed for two sections of land at Bent Creek and erected a log house. In 1902, Dixon and his family moved to Plemons. The first school building was destroyed by fire in 1920, and a temporary school was held on the second floor of Billy Dixon's former home at Bent Creek until a new one would be erected.

Dixon was appointed the first postmaster when Adobe Walls received its post office on August 3, 1887. Dixon ran the post office out of his home, where his business partner S.G. Carter and he also had a store. He served as postmaster until 1901, when Otto Anderson was appointed postmaster. The post office was closed in 1921 and mail service moved to Plemons.

Adobe Walls was a polling site, and voting there in the 19th century was a multiday community event that included barbecue and accompaniments. Today, Adobe Walls is a ghost town.

In 1923, the Panhandle-Plains Historical Society became owners of the remains of the 1874 trading post, and conducted archeological excavations in the 1970s. On June 27, 1924, a red granite monument was erected in memory of the men from the 1874 battle. From the 1940s to 1970s, Adobe Walls had a total population of 15 people. In May 1978, Adobe Walls was added to the National Register of Historic Places.

== Notable people ==
- Quanah Parker, Comanche warrior who led the raid of the Second Battle of Adobe Walls
- Billy Dixon (1850–1913) Medal of Honor awarded November 4, 1874, for gallantry in action on September 12, 1874 (Buffalo Wallow Fight). In 1916, Dixon's was one of 900 medals withdrawn as "unwarranted". The U.S. Army Board of Correction of Records restored the medal in 1989.

== See also ==
- National Register of Historic Places listings in Hutchinson County, Texas
- List of ghost towns in Texas

== Additional sourcing ==
- Baker, T. Lindsay; Harrison, Billy R.; Price, B. Byron (2001). Adobe Walls: The History and Archaeology of the 1874 Trading Post. TAMU Press. ISBN 978-1-58544-176-1.
