= Danielle Jones =

Danielle Jones may refer to:

- Murder of Danielle Jones (1985–2001), 2001 British crime regarding the disappearance of Danielle Sarah Jones
- Danielle Jones (tennis) (born 1969), Australian professional tennis player
- Danielle Jones (EastEnders), a fictional character from EastEnders television series
- Dani Jones (born 1996), American middle-distance runner
- Danielle Jones (physician), American obstetrician-gynecologist
