= National Register of Historic Places listings in Hutchinson County, Texas =

Location of Hutchinson County in Texas

This is a list of the National Register of Historic Places listings in Hutchinson County, Texas.

This is intended to be a complete list of properties and districts listed on the National Register of Historic Places in Hutchinson County, Texas. There are one district and two individual properties listed on the National Register in the county. One property is also a Recorded Texas Historic Landmark.

This National Park Service list is complete through NPS recent listings posted March 21, 2025.

== Current listings ==
The publicly disclosed locations of National Register properties and districts may be seen in a mapping service provided.

	Name on the Register	Image	Date listed	Location	City or town	Description
1	Adobe Walls		May 22, 1978 (#78002958)	Address restricted	Stinnett	
2	Antelope Creek Archeological District	Antelope Creek Archeological District	September 22, 1972 (#72001366)	Address restricted	Fritch	
3	Hutchinson County Courthouse	Hutchinson County Courthouse	August 28, 2012 (#12000587)	500 North Main Street; 35°49′39″N 101°26′32″W	Stinnett	Recorded Texas Historic Landmark

== See also ==
- National Register of Historic Places listings in Texas
- Recorded Texas Historic Landmarks in Hutchinson County
