= Spring Creek Independent School District =

School district in Texas

Location
- 9849 FM 2171, Skellytown, Texas, 79080 United States of America

District information
- Type: Public
- Grades: K – 12
- Established: 1949
- Closed: 2024
- Superintendent: Danny Finch (final)

Other information
- Website: www.springcreekisd.net

The Spring Creek Independent School District (SCISD) was a public school district located in southeastern Hutchinson County, Texas, United States; it stopped operations in 2024.

The district consisted of a single campus, Spring Creek School, that, at the end of the district's life, served students in grades kindergarten through 12th grade. To boost enrollment, Spring Creek also accepted transfer students from outside of the district.

In 2001, the district only included elementary school, and secondary students (grades 7-12) from Spring Creek ISD's territory were allowed to attend one of three neighboring districts – Borger, Plemons-Stinnett-Phillips, or White Deer. Up to the time of closure, the district still gave the options for 7-12 students to attend any of those three districts, as well as the Panhandle Independent School District.

In 2009, the school district was rated "exemplary" by the Texas Education Agency.

== History ==
The first Spring Creek School building was built in 1900, one year prior to the organization of Hutchinson County, on the Harvey Ranch. In its first year, there were a total of seven school-aged students, six males and one female, and six under school age for a total of 13. In 1901, the Hutchinson County Commissioners Court divided the county into four school districts, Spring Creek being named district #4. The school moved to several different locations until the 1930s, when a red brick school building was constructed. On March 8, 1938, the school was dedicated in a ceremony attended by approximately 500 people. The Spring Creek Independent School District was formed in 1949.

On September 22, 2001, Spring Creek celebrated its 100th anniversary and held an all-school reunion as well as an official historical marker dedication.

The district changed to a four day school week in fall 2018.

=== Closure ===
The student count was 96 in the 2021-2022 school year. Circa 2023-2024, the enrollment ranged from 72 to 78. In January 2024, enrollment was below 80, with fewer than 10 students living in the school district. The enrollment figures were below those of previous eras. The State of Texas stopped giving state funding since student enrollment was under 90, and the Texas Education Agency (TEA) wanted $600,000 back that it had given the district. The school community believed that funding would be exhausted and the school would collapse. Danny Finch, the final superintendent, stated that the prospective student enrollment for the 2024-2025 school year, had it happened, would be "dire".

Therefore, the district sought to consolidate into the Borger Independent School District. In January 2024, the board of trustees of Spring Creek ISD approved a merger, with one member voting against. In February 2024 all members of the board of trustees of Borger ISD approved a merger agreement. The State of Texas had plans to spend $500,000 to assist the consolidation. On July 1, 2024, the district consolidated into Borger ISD.

== Principal/Superintendents ==
Since 1937, Spring Creek School had the following principal/superintendents. They are:

- James W. Dillard (1937-1946)
- L.E. Dyer (1946-1980)
- Gene Weeks (1980-1987)
- Susan Perez (1987-1991)
- Peter Cameron (1991-1995)
- Bret Madsen (1995-2012)
- Mandy Poer (2012–)

== Student demographics ==
As of the 2007-2008 school year, the Spring Creek Independent School District had a total enrollment of 85 students.

- Ethnicity
  - Whites: 69 (81.2%)
  - Hispanics: 12 (14.1%)
  - African Americans: 4 (4.7%)
- Socio-Economic Groups
  - Economic Disadvantaged: 41 (48.2%)
  - Limited English Proficient: 3 (3.5%)
  - Students w/Disciplinary Placements (2006–07): 0 (0.0%)
  - "At-Risk": 40 (47.1%)
- Historic District Enrollment Figures by school year

- 1988-89 - 34 students
- 1989-90 - 32 students
- 1990-91 - 34 students
- 1991-92 - 42 students
- 1992-93 - 57 students
- 1993-94 - 66 students

- 1994-95 - 102 students
- 1995-96 - 91 students
- 1996-97 - 84 students
- 1997-98 - 106 students
- 1998-99 - 105 students
- 1999-00 - 118 students
- 2000-01 - 138 students

- 2001-02 - 144 students
- 2002-03 - 92 students
- 2003-04 - 94 students
- 2004-05 - 96 students
- 2005-06 - 99 students
- 2006-07 - 95 students

== Programs ==
Spring Creek Elementary School offered a Gifted and Talented Program, a Learning Lab where students can receive assistance on individual curriculum objectives, and a strong technology program. As well as an active Parent-Teacher Organization (P.T.O.).

They also offered programs and classes such as: art, journalism, Student Council, National Junior Honor Society, and National Honor Society, basketball.

== See also ==
- List of school districts in Texas
