= Sergei Bongart =

American painter (1918–1985)

Serhii Bongart
- Born: Ukrainian: Сергій Романович Бонгарт (Бонгард); March 15, 1918; Kyiv, Ukraine
- Died: March 3, 1985 (aged 66); St. John's Hospital, Santa Monica, United States
- Known for: Painting
- Spouse: Patricia LeGrande Bongart

Serhii Romanovich Bongart (Ukrainian: Сергій Романович Бонгарт; 1918–1985) was an American painter. Bongart is admired for his richly colored and emotionally expressive landscapes, still lifes and portraits. He was best known as a colorist, working in exaggerated color, using dynamic but carefully controlled color relationships and extolling the virtues of approaching painting as "color first, subject last".

== Early life and education ==
Bongart was born in Kyiv in Ukraine. He studied art in Kyiv, Prague, Vienna and Munich, before emigrating to the United States in 1948. Bongart lived for six years in Memphis, Tennessee, the location of his sponsor.

== Career ==
In 1954 Bongart moved to Los Angeles where he founded an art school. He taught a number of aspiring young painters who later became well-known, nationally collected American artists—among them: Peter Liashkov, Del Gish, Sunny Apinchapong, Ron Lukus, Rulon Hacking, Melinda Miles, Patricia LeGrande Bongart, Susan Greaves, James Dudley Slay, Don Sahli, Ted Pressett, George Phillips, Guido Frick, Ovanes Berberian, S.Burkett Kaiser and Nancy Seamons Crookston.

In 1969 he established an art school in Idaho. He lived half the year in Santa Monica, California and the other half near Rexburg, Idaho. Much of his art reflects the rustic settings which reminded him of his homeland. A few weeks before his death Bongart got the last visit from one of his students. That happened in a Hospital near Geneva in Switzerland, where the hope was, to save his life with a cell therapy. The student was Guido Frick, a painter from Germany. He remembers his visit:” To see Sergei in this hospital bed was heartbreaking. He was half the man I met just a few months before at his last Idaho- workshop. He was so weak and fragile, he hardly could rise his arm to wave me to come in. Several pillows stabilized him, while halfway sitting in his bed. When I left, we both knew, this was the last time we have seen each other. On a stretcher he was brought back to Santa Monica and died there a few days later in a hospital”.

Bongart's work is featured in prominent museums, and has received many awards, including a 1982 Gold Medal from the National Cowboy Hall of Fame for his oil painting entitled "Spring Evening." In 1968, he was elected into the National Academy of Design as an Associate member.

There are three books written to date about Bongart:

- Balcomb, Mary N. (2002). Serhii Bongart. Seattle: Cody Publishing. ISBN 978-1887532075.
- LeGrande Bongart, Patricia (2000). Serhii Bongart: Touched by the Gods. P. Bogart. ISBN 978-0974471303.
- Meyer, Claudia (1982). Serhii Bongart. Profiles In American Art. Ken Meyer Productions.
