= West Texas High School =

Location
- 600 South Stewart Street; Stinnett, Texas 79083-3440; United States; 35.826290°N 101.449076°W

Information
- School type: Public high school
- Motto: Tu'Wee
- Established: 1987
- School district: Plemons-Stinnett-Phillips Consolidated Independent School District
- Principal: Stan Williams
- Teaching staff: 35.31 (on an FTE basis)
- Grades: 9-12
- Enrollment: 311 (2023–2024)
- Student to teacher ratio: 8.81
- Colors: Scarlet, Tan & Gold
- Athletics conference: UIL Class AA
- Mascot: Comanche
- Website: West Texas High School website

West Texas High School is a public high school in Stinnett, Texas (USA). In 1987 three great schools and communities, Plemons, Stinnett and Phillips joined forces to create the Plemons-Stinnett-Phillips Consolidated Independent School District. Three mascots, the Plemons Indians, Stinnett Rattlers and the Phillips Blackhawks were blended together to create the Comanches. The campuses of the district, West Texas Elementary School, West Texas Middle School and West Texas High School are all united as Comanches. The school is classified as a 2A school by the UIL. In 2015, the school was rated "Met Standard" by the Texas Education Agency.

== Athletics ==
The West Texas Comanches compete in these sports

- Baseball
- Basketball 2018 2A UIL State Champs
- Cross Country
- Football
- Golf
- Powerlifting
- Softball
- Tennis
- Track and Field
- Volleyball

=== State Titles ===
- One Act Play -
  - 1994(2A), 1997(2A), 1998(2A)

2A Boys Basketball State Championship **2018
