= Whittenburg, Texas =

Ghost town in Texas

Whittenburg is a ghost town in Hutchinson County, Texas, United States.

== History ==
The town was founded by area rancher James A. Whittenburg in 1926 to benefit economically from the oil boom in the area, utilizing the town for the employees of the Phillips Petroleum Company to reside in. In the same year, a post office, several churches, and a school was established in the town.

As the oil boom increased, permanent housing and businesses would replace the shanties and rooming houses, and by 1936, the town had a population of 200.

In 1938, Whittenburg merged with Pantex to form Phillips as per the votes from both of the townsides.

== See also ==
- List of ghost towns in Texas
