= Plemons, Texas =

- Ghost town
- Location within the state of Texas
- Coordinates: 35°48′03″N 101°18′33″W
- Country: United States
- State: Texas
- Counties: Hutchinson
- Elevation: 2,740 ft (840 m)
- Time zone: UTC-6 (Central (CST))
  - Summer (DST): UTC-5 (CDT)
- Area code: 806
- FIPS code: 48
- GNIS feature ID: 1380381

Plemons is a ghost town in Hutchinson County, in the U.S. state of Texas. It is located 10 miles southeast of Stinnett, and 8 miles (13 km) northeast of Borger, on Plemons Road, just north of the junction of County Road R.

== Establishment ==
In 1898, Oklahoma rancher James Andrew Whittenburg filed on four sections of land in Hutchinson County, where he built a dugout shelter near the Canadian River. He used the acreage as the family homestead. In 1901, Whittenburg donated acreage from the homestead land for the establishment of a town. When Barney Plemons filed for land there, the town was named for him. Plemons became the county seat in 1901 when Hutchinson County was organized. E. E. Akers built the courthouse.

== Economy ==
Mattie Sams was appointed the first postmaster when Plemons received its post office on May 29, 1901. The post office was in operation until 1952.

The first decade of its existence, Plemons had 15 families. Billy Dixon moved to Plemons from Adobe Walls and operated a boarding house. Dixon became the first county sheriff. The Plemons economy realized modest benefit from nearby Turkey Track ranch and Tar Box ranch.

== New county seat ==
The Amarillo branch of the Rock Island and Gulf Railway bypassed Plemons, routing 10 miles (16 km) to the north. Stinnett was then developed to be a shipping point for the railroad. In 1926, the county seat of government was moved to Stinnett. Plemons began to decline after that, despite a brief spurt during the oil boom. Today, Plemons is considered a ghost town.

== Education ==
The area was served by the Plemons Independent School District until July 1, 1987, when it merged into the Plemons-Stinnett-Phillips Consolidated Independent School District.

== Plemons Cemetery ==
Recorded Texas Historic Landmark Marker number 12096 was designated for the Plemons Cemetery. The first burial is believed to have been Mrs. E. E. Akers, date unknown. The last burial was Charles Ray Sessions in 1953. The local Boy Scouts troop spearheaded preservation efforts of the cemetery.

== Notable person ==
- Billy Dixon (1850–1913) lived in Plemons from 1902 to 1906. He was awarded the Medal of Honor on November 4, 1874, for gallantry in action on September 12, 1874. In 1916, Dixon's was one of 900 medals withdrawn as "unwarranted". The U.S. Army Board of Correction of Records restored the medal in 1989.

== Climate ==
According to the Köppen climate classification, Plemons has a semiarid climate, BSk on climate maps.
