= Lake Meredith Estates, Texas =

- Census-designated place
- Location within Texas Location within the United States
- Coordinates: 35°39′50″N 101°36′10″W
- Country: United States
- State: Texas
- County: Hutchinson

Area
  - Total: 0.834 sq mi (2.16 km^{2})
  - Land: 0.834 sq mi (2.16 km^{2})
  - Water: 0 sq mi (0 km^{2})
- Elevation: 3,133 ft (955 m)

Population (2010)
  - Total: 437
  - Density: 524/sq mi (202/km^{2})
- Time zone: UTC-6 (Central (CST))
  - Summer (DST): UTC-5 (CDT)
- Area code: 806
- GNIS feature ID: 2586948

Lake Meredith Estates is an unincorporated community and census-designated place in Hutchinson County, Texas, United States. As of the 2020 census, Lake Meredith Estates had a population of 338.

== Geography ==
According to the U.S. Census Bureau, the community has an area of 0.834 square miles (2.16 km^{2}), all land.

== Demographics ==
Historical population
Census	Pop.	Note	%±
2010	437		—
2020	338		−22.7%
U.S. Decennial Census; 1850–1900 1910; 1920 1930 1940; 1950 1960 1970; 1980 1990 2000; 2010 2020

Lake Meredith Estates first appeared as a census designated place in the 2010 U.S. census.

Lake Meredith Estates CDP, Texas – Racial and ethnic composition Note: the US Census treats Hispanic/Latino as an ethnic category. This table excludes Latinos from the racial categories and assigns them to a separate category. Hispanics/Latinos may be of any race.
Race / Ethnicity (NH = Non-Hispanic)	Pop 2010	Pop 2020	% 2010	% 2020
White alone (NH)	388	276	88.79%	81.66%
Black or African American alone (NH)	1	2	0.23%	0.59%
Native American or Alaska Native alone (NH)	2	10	0.46%	2.96%
Asian alone (NH)	1	0	0.23%	0.00%
Native Hawaiian or Pacific Islander alone (NH)	0	0	0.00%	0.00%
Other race alone (NH)	0	1	0.00%	0.30%
Mixed race or Multiracial (NH)	7	21	1.60%	6.21%
Hispanic or Latino (any race)	38	28	8.70%	8.28%
Total	437	338	100.00%	100.00%
