= Danielle Jones (physician) =

American-born obstetrician-gynecologist (born 1986)

- Born: Danielle Nicole Brown; August 12, 1986 (age 39); Borger, Texas, U.S.
- Education: Texas A&M University; Texas Tech University Health Sciences Center School of Medicine
- Occupations: Ob/Gyn; Science communicator
- Known for: Social media presence, advocating for sex education
- Medical career
- Field: Obstetrics and gynaecology
- Institutions: Baylor Scott & White Medical Center; Southland Hospital; Texas A&M Health Science Center

YouTube information
- Channel: Mama Doctor Jones
- Years active: 2017–present
- Genres: Medical education Sex education
- Subscribers: 1.48 million
- Views: 255 million
- Last updated: Apr 14, 2026
- Website: mindonmed.com

Danielle Nicole Jones (née Brown; born August 12, 1986), also known as Mama Doctor Jones, is an American obstetrician-gynecologist (OB/GYN) and science communicator. Various media outlets have highlighted her significant following on YouTube, Instagram, and TikTok, where she has received attention for her posts to young people about sexual health.

== Personal life and education ==
Jones was born in Borger, Texas on August 12, 1986.

She received a Bachelors of Science in Psychology from Texas A&M University before pursuing postgraduate medical studies at the Texas Tech University Health Sciences Center, where she received her Doctorate of Medicine.

Jones married Donnie Ray Jones, a coder and photographer, with whom she has four children. In 2021, the family moved to Invercargill, New Zealand. Jones confirmed in October 2025 that she and her husband have now divorced and will remain abroad for the foreseeable future, as they have shared custody of their four children. She relocated to New Zealand with her children and became a permanent resident.

== Career ==
She worked as an OB/GYN at Baylor Scott & White Medical Center in College Station, Texas and as an assistant professor at Texas A&M Health Science Center. Various media outlets have highlighted her significant following on YouTube, Instagram, and TikTok, where she has received attention for her posts aiming to educate young people about sexual health.

Jones is a founding member of the Pinnacle Conference, a leadership conference for female physicians, as well as the Association for Healthcare Social Media.

In 2021, she accepted a job at Southland Hospital in Invercargill, New Zealand.

== Social media ==
In 2009, Jones began posting on social media about medical topics as a medical student with two goals: provide the public with accurate medical information and provide a "traveling CV" of her work. Her primary modes of communication were Twitter and her blog, later adding YouTube. In November 2021, Jones received a YouTube gold award for reaching one million subscribers.

Jones' content has been banned by the Fairbanks, Alaska school board.

== Recognition ==
Year	Work	Awarding Body	Award	Ref.
2016	Dr. Danielle Jones (Brown) M.D.	Society of Maternal Fetal Medicine	Excellence in High-Risk Pregnancy Care	
2016	Dr. Danielle Jones (Brown) M.D.	American College of Ob/Gyn, District XI	The Creighton L. Edwards, MD, Award in Compassionate Care	
2017	Dr. Danielle Jones (Brown) M.D.	AAGL	Excellence in Laparoscopic Surgery	
2021	MamaDrJones	YouTube	YouTube Play Button Gold	
