= Don Sahli =

American painter

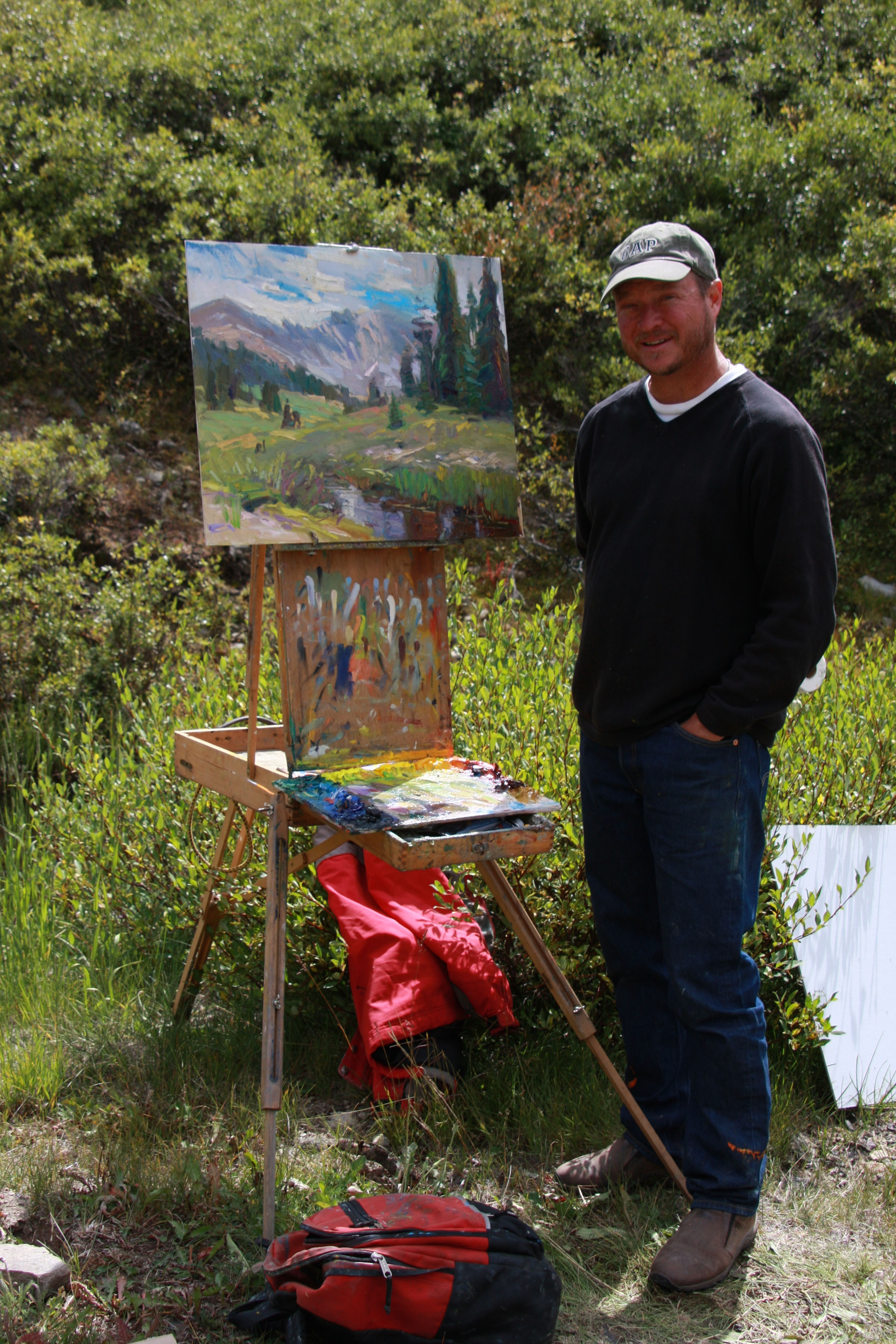
- Known for: Painting
- Website: sahlistudio.com

Don Sahli is an American painter.

== Biography ==
Don Sahli made the decision to become a professional artist at a very early age. By age 16, he was selling his work and by 18, Sahli was exhibiting as an established painter. In 1982, he became friends with Sergei Bongart.

Sahli was the last scholarship student and apprentice of Sergei Bongart. During this period with his mentor, Sahli was taught an academic approach.

In 1995, Sahli opened the Sahli School of Art in Evergreen, Colorado. Then in 2008, Sahli produced art instruction DVDs with interactive features.

== Work ==
Sahli's work is currently represented in galleries around the country. As a painter, Sahli travels throughout the country painting the landscape. When painting en plein air, Sahli works on at least a 16 x 20 canvas, and in the studio he works on canvases of 3.5 x 7 ft. and larger.
