= American Association of Gynecologic Laparoscopists =

- Founded: 1971
- Location: Cypress, CA, United States
- Members: 8,000+
- Key people: Dr. Mauricio Abrao - President; Dr. Andrew Sokol - Vice President; Linda Michels - Executive Director; Dr. Linda Bradley - Medical Director
- Website: www.aagl.org

The American Association of Gynecologic Laparoscopists (or AAGL) is a professional association of laparoscopic surgeons dedicated to the research and advancement of minimally invasive gynecologic procedures. The AAGL was founded by Jordan M. Phillips, M.D., in 1971. It later switched to using just the acronym to reflect its international scope, and currently it has over 8,000 members spread over 110 countries. The laparoscope, a form of endoscope, often allows surgery to be done with smaller incisions and faster recovery (that is, in a minimally invasive way) compared with older open techniques.

The society has held dialogues, discussed and shared views on minimally invasive procedures.

== Meetings ==
AAGL provides a number of Continuing Medical Education (CME) events to its members throughout the year, including the AAGL Global Congress on Minimally Invasive Gynecology held each November.

== Publications ==
AAGL publishes the advancements in gynecologic laparoscopy and other conference proceedings in the Journal of Minimally Invasive Gynecology, a part of AAGL. The journal was known as the Journal of the American Association of Gynecologic Laparoscopists from 1993 to 2004.

== Affiliations ==
AAGL has over 40 collaborations with sister societies around the world which include the North America, South America, European Union, Africa, Australasia & Asia. The society corroborates international relationship as a means to promote the art of training and free knowledge flow through partnership and collaboration.

== Debate ==
- Hysterectomy:In January 2014, there was a debate in relation to a Minimally Invasive Hysterectomy procedure called Uterine Morcellation. Morcellation involves using of a powered device to grind the tumor/fibroid into smaller pieces. The pieces are later removed through small incisions. The in house editors at Lancet Oncology had stated the use of morcellation to pose risks ten times higher to normal surgery. However, many doctors & members of other societies have defended the procedure by stating the risks to be 1-in-400 to 1-in-1000. The message board of AAGL had been the forefront of the debate till association decided to call off the debate because of the controversy. As per the leader of AAGL, they were preparing a paper investigating the risks in relation hysterectomy.

== See also ==
- Laparoscopy
- Laparoscopic surgery
