= Borger Independent School District =

School district in Texas

Independent School District

Location
- 200 E. 9th St. Borger, Texas ESC Region 16 USA
- Coordinates: 35°40′32″N 101°23′18″W

District information
- Type: Independent school district
- Grades: Pre-K through 12
- Superintendent: Chance Welch
- Schools: 7 (2009-10)
- NCES District ID: 4810890

Students and staff
- Students: 2,764 (2010-11)
- Teachers: 208.01 (2009-10) (on full-time equivalent (FTE) basis)
- Student–teacher ratio: 13.53 (2009-10)
- Athletic conference: UIL Class 3A Football & Basketball
- District mascot: Bulldogs
- Colors: Red, White

Other information
- TEA District Accountability Rating for 2011-12: Academically Acceptable
- Website: Borger ISD

Borger Independent School District is a public school district based in Borger, Texas, United States. The district operates one high school, Borger High School.

== History ==
On July 1, 2024, the Spring Creek Independent School District consolidated into Borger ISD.

== Finances ==
As of the 2010–2011 school year, the appraised valuation of property in the district was $548,516,000. The maintenance tax rate was $0.104 and the bond tax rate was $0.029 per $100 of appraised valuation.

== Academic achievement ==
In 2011, the school district was rated "academically acceptable" by the Texas Education Agency. Forty-nine percent of districts in Texas in 2011 received the same rating. No state accountability ratings will be given to districts in 2012. A school district in Texas can receive one of four possible rankings from the Texas Education Agency: Exemplary (the highest possible ranking), Recognized, Academically Acceptable, and Academically Unacceptable (the lowest possible ranking).

Historical district TEA accountability ratings

- 2011: Academically Acceptable
- 2010: Academically Acceptable
- 2009: Academically Acceptable
- 2008: Academically Acceptable
- 2007: Academically Acceptable
- 2006: Academically Acceptable
- 2005: Academically Acceptable
- 2004: Academically Acceptable

== Schools ==
In the 2011–2012 school year, the district operated seven schools.
Regular instructional

- Borger High (Grades 9–12)
- Borger Middle (Grades 7–8)
- Borger Intermediate (Grade 5–6)
- Crockett (Grade 3–4)
- Gateway (1–2)
- Paul Belton Early Childhood Center (Grades PK-Kindergarten)

== Special programs ==
=== Athletics ===
Borger High School participates in the boys sports of baseball, basketball, football, tennis, soccer, wrestling, golf and track. The school participates in the girls sports of basketball, tennis, soccer, softball, volleyball, golf and track. For the 2012 through 2013 school years, Borger High School will play football and basketball in UIL Class 3A.

== See also ==
- List of school districts in Texas
- List of high schools in Texas
