= Stinnett, Texas =

- City
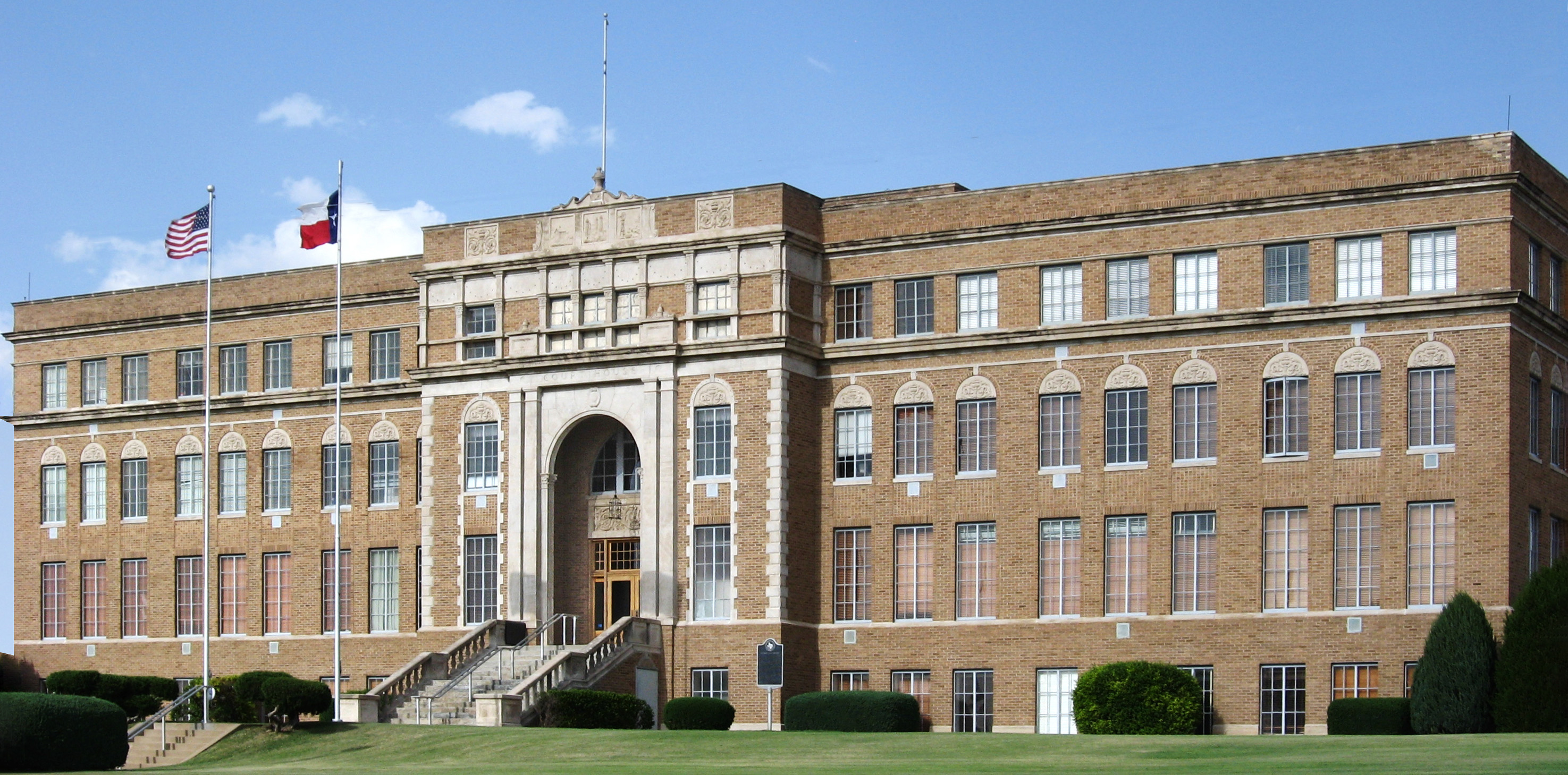
- Hutchinson County Courthouse

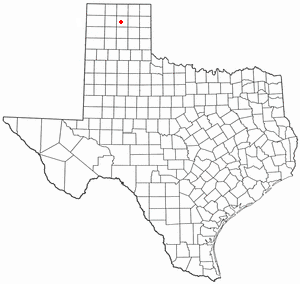
- Location of Stinnett, Texas

- Coordinates: 35°49′23″N 101°26′37″W
- Country: United States
- State: Texas
- County: Hutchinson

Area
  - Total: 1.98 sq mi (5.14 km^{2})
  - Land: 1.98 sq mi (5.14 km^{2})
  - Water: 0 sq mi (0.00 km^{2})
- Elevation: 3,176 ft (968 m)

Population (2020)
  - Total: 1,650
  - Density: 831/sq mi (321/km^{2})
- Time zone: UTC-6 (Central (CST))
  - Summer (DST): UTC-5 (CDT)
- ZIP code: 79083
- Area code: 806
- FIPS code: 48-70340
- GNIS feature ID: 2411984
- Website: cityofstinnett.com

Stinnett (/stɪˈnɛt/ sti-NET) is a city in and the county seat of Hutchinson County, Texas, United States. The population was 1,650 at the 2020 census.

== History ==
Stinnett was established in 1926 by A.P. (Ace) Borger, better known as the founder of Borger, a larger community in the county, and his brother Lester Andrew (Pete) Borger. In September 1926, Stinnett replaced Plemons, which later became a ghost town, as the Hutchinson County seat. The courthouse, built in 1927 in the Spanish Renaissance style, was financed from petroleum money. The structure, designed by the architect W.F. Townes, consists of brown brick and cut white stone.

== Geography ==
According to the United States Census Bureau, the city has a total area of 2.0 square miles (5.2 km^{2}), all land.

=== Climate ===
According to the Köppen climate classification system, Stinnett has a semiarid climate, BSk on climate maps.

== Demographics ==
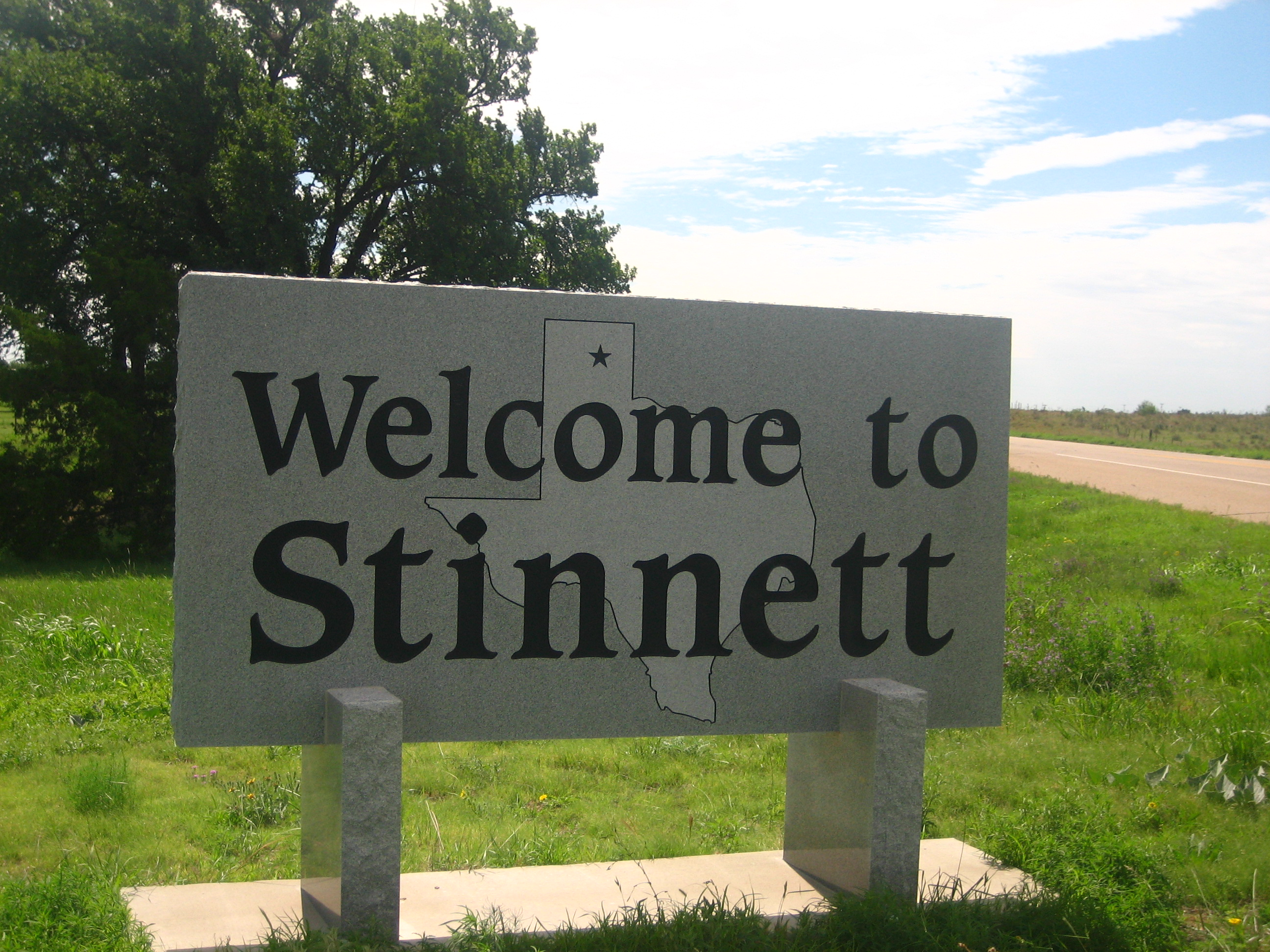
Stinnett welcome sign near the intersection of Texas Highways 207 and 152

Historical population
Census	Pop.	Note	%±
1930	377		—
1940	635		68.4%
1950	1,170		84.3%
1960	2,695		130.3%
1970	2,014		−25.3%
1980	2,222		10.3%
1990	2,166		−2.5%
2000	1,936		−10.6%
2010	1,881		−2.8%
2020	1,650		−12.3%
U.S. Decennial Census

=== 2020 census ===
As of the 2020 census, Stinnett had a population of 1,650. The median age was 38.1 years. 26.1% of residents were under the age of 18 and 17.8% of residents were 65 years of age or older. For every 100 females there were 105.2 males, and for every 100 females age 18 and over there were 102.2 males age 18 and over.

0.0% of residents lived in urban areas, while 100.0% lived in rural areas.

There were 631 households in Stinnett, of which 31.7% had children under the age of 18 living in them. Of all households, 53.2% were married-couple households, 19.5% were households with a male householder and no spouse or partner present, and 23.0% were households with a female householder and no spouse or partner present. About 26.7% of all households were made up of individuals and 12.4% had someone living alone who was 65 years of age or older.

There were 787 housing units, of which 19.8% were vacant. The homeowner vacancy rate was 3.3% and the rental vacancy rate was 13.0%.

Racial composition as of the 2020 census
Race	Number	Percent
White	1,370	83.0%
Black or African American	15	0.9%
American Indian and Alaska Native	31	1.9%
Asian	3	0.2%
Native Hawaiian and Other Pacific Islander	0	0.0%
Some other race	50	3.0%
Two or more races	181	11.0%
Hispanic or Latino (of any race)	244	14.8%

=== 2000 census ===
At the 2000 census, 1,936 people, 765 households, and 554 families lived in the city. The population density was 972.8 inhabitants per square mile (375.6/km^{2}). The 870 housing units averaged 437.2/sq mi (168.8/km^{2}). The racial makeup of the city was 91.58% White, 0.26% African American, 1.29% Native American, 0.21% Asian, 3.98% from other races, and 2.69% from two or more races. Hispanics or Latinos of any race were 7.54%.

Of the 765 households, 36.1% had children under the age of 18 living with them, 56.6% were married couples living together, 11.0% had a female householder with no husband present, and 27.5% were not families. About 26.1% of households were one person and 13.2% were one person aged 65 or older. The average household size was 2.49 and the average family size was 2.98.

The age distribution was 27.9% under the age of 18, 7.7% from 18 to 24, 27.1% from 25 to 44, 22.5% from 45 to 64, and 14.7% 65 or older. The median age was 37 years. For every 100 females, there were 101.5 males. For every 100 females age 18 and over, there were 96.8 males. The median household income was $33,387 and the median family income was $42,969. Males had a median income of $35,395 versus $18,750 for females. The per capita income for the city was $16,242. About 7.9% of families and 10.6% of the population were below the poverty line, including 15.4% of those under age 18 and 7.5% of those age 65 or over.

== Education ==
The City of Stinnett is served by the Plemons-Stinnett-Phillips Consolidated Independent School District. It was a part of the Stinnett Independent School District until July 1, 1987, when it merged into the PSP CISD.

== Notable people ==
- Donny Anderson, former NFL player, though born in Borger, he graduated in 1961 from Stinnett High School.
- Jalin Conyers, Current NFL Tight End for the Miami Dolphins, attended school in Stinnett and won a state title in basketball his sophomore year in 2018
