= Plemons-Stinnett-Phillips Consolidated Independent School District =

Public school district

Plemons-Stinnett-Phillips Consolidated Independent School District is a public school district based in Stinnett, Texas (USA).

It operates three schools, and its mascot is the Comanche.

== History ==
The consolidation of the Plemons, Stinnett, and Phillips independent school districts into PSPCISD was effective July 1, 1987. Each of the predecessor school districts had its own mascot, and the "Comanches" was chosen as the mascot for the unified district.

== Awards and recognition ==
- 2016–2017 – Superior rating by FIRST
  - FIRST – The state's school financial accountability rating system, known as the School Financial Integrity Rating System of Texas (FIRST), ensures that Texas public schools are held accountable for the quality of their financial management practices and that they improve those practices. The system is designed to encourage Texas public schools to better manage their financial resources to provide the maximum allocation possible for direct instructional purposes.
- 2004 – National Blue Ribbon School
- 2009 – "Recognized" by the Texas Education Agency

== Schools ==
- West Texas High School (Grades 9–12)
- West Texas Middle School (Grades 6–8)
- West Texas Elementary School (Grades PK-5)
