= Battle of Lyman's Wagon Train =

Longest battle of the Red River War

- U.S. National Register of Historic Places
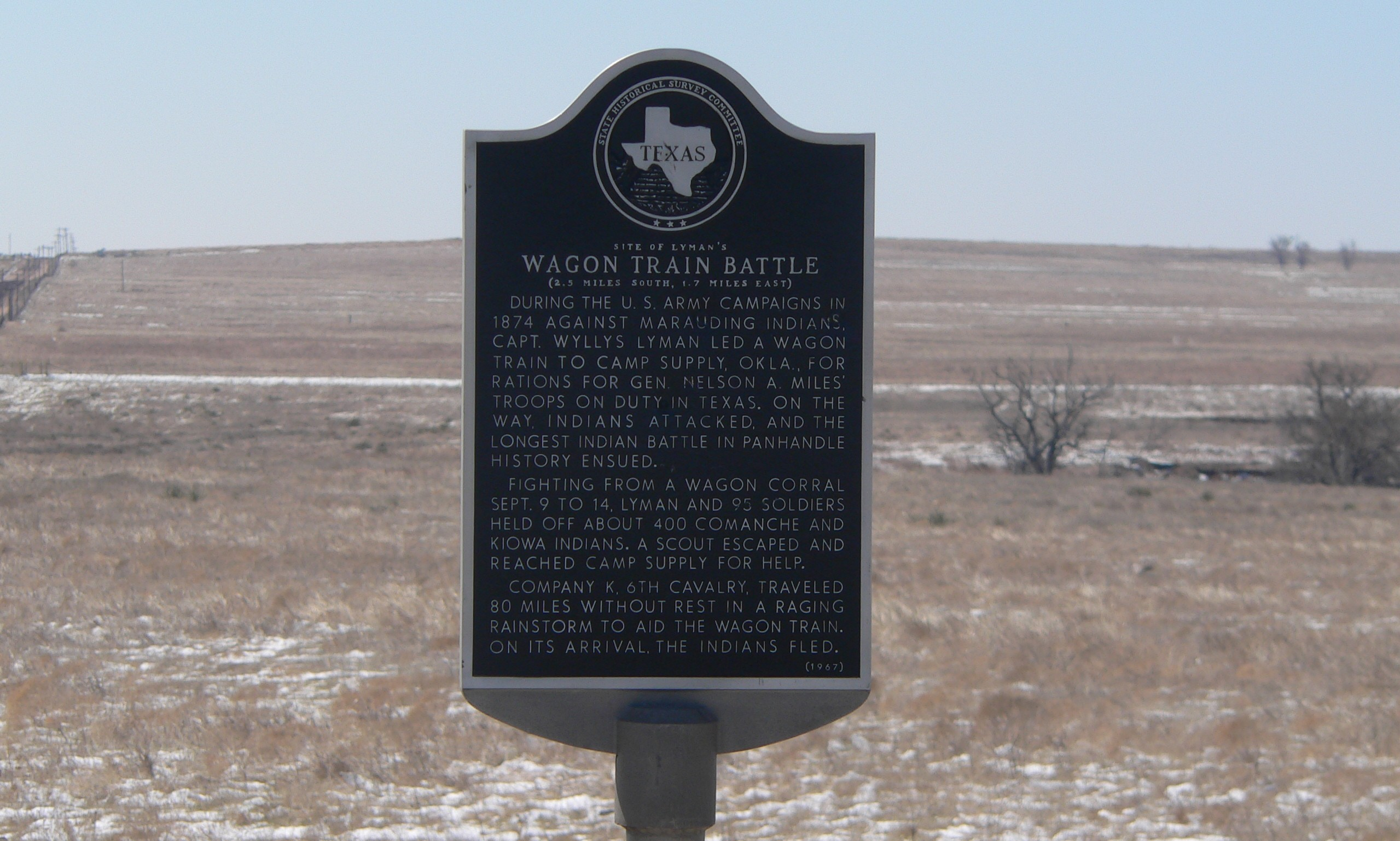
- Roadside historical marker near battle site

- Location within Texas
- Nearest city: Canadian, Hemphill County, Texas
- Coordinates: 35°46′N 100°11′W
- Area: 343 acres (139 ha)
- MPS: Battle Sites of the Red River War in the Texas Panhandle MPS
- NRHP reference No.: 01000875
- Added to NRHP: August 13, 2001

The Battle of the Lyman's Wagon Train was a five-day armed engagement between combined forces of the Comanche and Kiowa tribes and a wagon train, led by Captain Wyllys Lyman, on its way to Camp Supply in September 1874 near present-day Canadian, Texas. The engagement was the longest and one of the most publicized of the Red River War.

A 343 acres (139 ha) area of the battle site was listed on the National Register of Historic Places in 2001 for its information potential as an archeological site. As an archeological resource, the National Register does not disclose the location of the site.

Tehan, a white member of the Kiowa who was imprisoned by the army, escaped in the event and returned to his Kiowa home.

A number of soldiers and scouts received U.S. medals of honor for the battle. Thirteen troops were awarded the Medal of Honor on recommendation by Colonel Nelson A. Miles.

== Battle of Lyman's Wagon Train ==
Battle of Lyman's Wagon Train
- Part of the Red River War
Date	September 9 –14, 1874
Location	Hemphill County, Texas
Result	United States victory

Belligerents
United States	Comanche, Kiowa

Commanders and leaders
Wyllys Lyman	Big Bow, Big Tree; Guipago, Satanta

Strength
96 soldiers	400 warriors

On September 9, 1874, Captain Wyllys Lyman led a wagon train full of rations to Camp Supply in the Indian Territory for Col. Nelson A. Miles' troops when they were confronted by a group of Comanches and Kiowas. In the ensuing battle, Lyman and 95 troops formed a wagon corral and held off their adversaries, numbered at about 400, and a scout was dispatched to send word to Camp Supply. Soon after, the Sixth Cavalry was sent without rest and during a rainstorm to aid the wagon train. Upon their arrival on September 14, the attackers fled. At the end of the battle, 2 soldiers had been killed and 3 were injured while at least 13 warriors had been killed.

A marker was erected by the Texas State Historical Survey Committee in 1967 to commemorate the event, titled "Site of Lyman's Wagon Train Battle", and is located in Hemphill County, Texas.

Most of the conflict was fought near the Washita River. The site of the battle is located 10 miles east of State Highway 83 and 3 miles south of State Highway 33.

Big Bow, Big Tree, Guipago, Mamante, Satanta, and the nephew of Touhason, who is sometimes known as Touhason the Younger, were Kiowa leaders present at the battle. Touhason's sister's son, Agiati or "Gathering Feathers", inherited his name in 1864 and was also known as Touhason. Satanta's reported participation in the conflict likely contributed to his reincarceration at the state penitentiary at Huntsville for violation of his parole.

A number of soldiers and scouts received U.S. medals of honor for their gallantry in the battle including William De Armond, Billy Dixon, John Harrington, Fred S. Hay, John James, John J.H. Kelly, Thomas Kelly, George K. Kitchen, John W. Knox, William Koelpin, John Mitchell, William W. Morris, Frederick S. Neilon, Josiah Pennsyl, Peter Roth, Edward C. Sharpless, George W. Smith, and Zachariah T. Woodall. Thirteen troops were awarded the Medal of Honor on recommendation by Colonel Nelson A. Miles.

== Battle of Buffalo Wallow ==
Battle of Buffalo Wallow
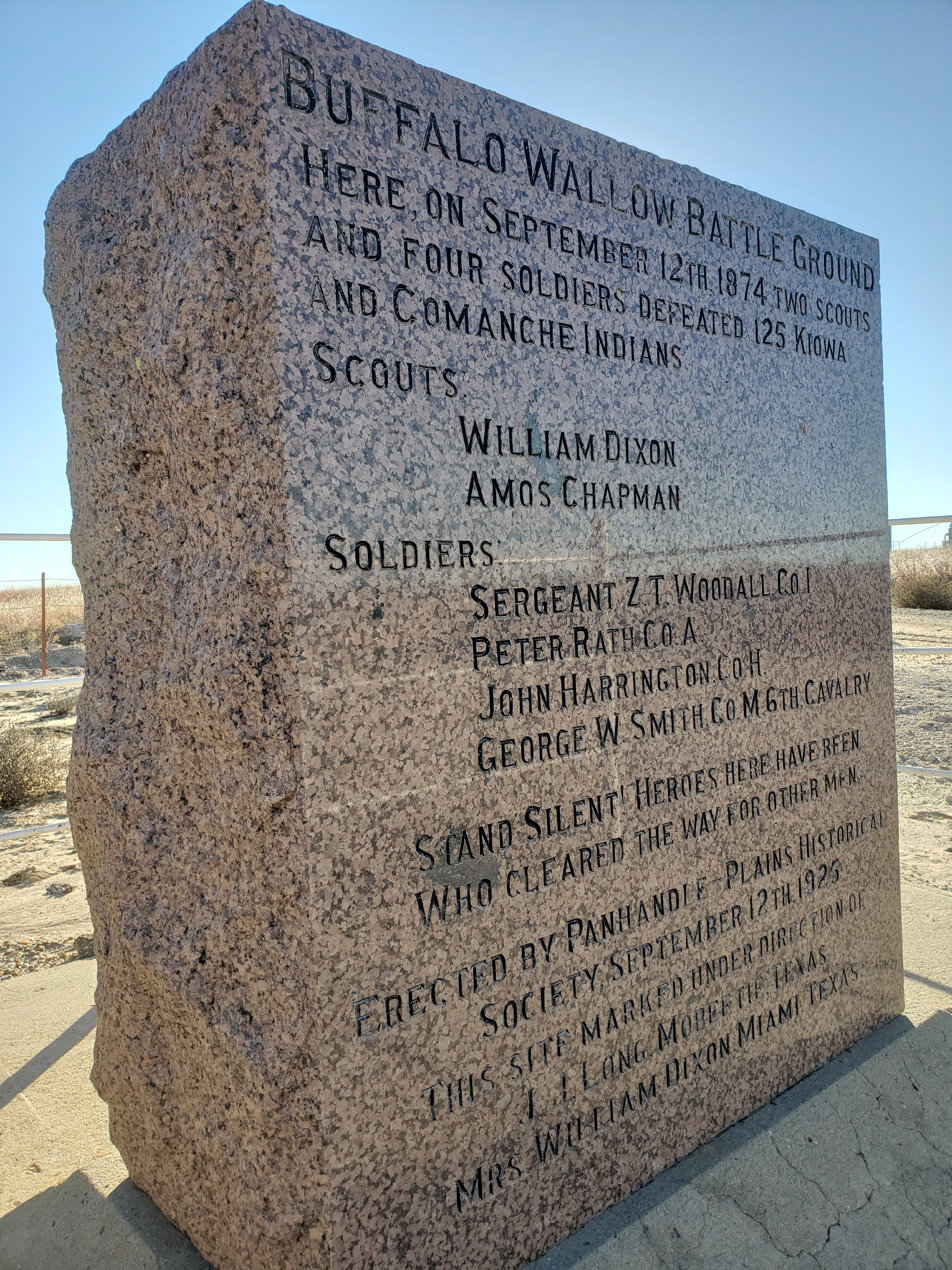
- Granite marker erected on the battle's 51st anniversary in 1925 by the Panhandle-Plains Historical Society.
Date	September 12, 1874
Location	present-day Hemphill County, Texas

Belligerents
United States	Comanche; Kiowa

On September 12, 1874, civilian scouts, Amos Chapman and Billy Dixon, were carrying dispatches from McClellan Creek to Camp Supply with Sergeant Zachariah T. Woodall, Private Peter Roth, Private John Harrington, and Private George W. Smith, as part of Col. Nelson A. Miles' Sixth Cavalry when they were encircled at sunrise by a "large band of Kiowa and Comanche warriors" near the Washita River.

Dismounting, George Smith was mortally wounded. Soon, Woodall, Harrington, Dixon and Chapman were wounded. All except Smith and Chapman had by noon made their way to a nearby bison wallow ten feet in diameter, where they used their hands and knives to throw up the sandy dirt all around the sides. Sitting upright, each man "fired deliberately, taking good aim, and were picking off an Indian at almost every round." Dixon eventually ran for Chapman, whose left knee had been shattered, and carried him back to the wallow. By 3 pm, a thunderstorm brought rain and relief from their thirst, but when the wind "shifted to the north", the cold brought discomfort to all parties, especially the Natives who sat on their horses out of rifle range "with their blankets drawn tightly around them." Roth went for Smith's gun and ammunition, but when Smith was discovered still alive, Roth and Dixon brought Smith back to the wallow where he died during the night. At daylight, Dixon went for help, soon encountering troops under the command of Major William R. Price. For their participation in what became known as the Battle of Buffalo Wallow, Woodall and the five men under his command were awarded the Medal of Honor.

Billy Dixon's medal is presently on display at the Panhandle–Plains Historical Museum in Canyon, Texas. Amos Chapman's and Billy Dixon's medals were revoked after a records review that was conducted from 1916 to 1917 found that they were ineligible because they were civilian scouts. In 1989 an Army Board of Correction of Records reinstated the awards.

A Texas Historical Marker documents the battle site.

== See also ==
- National Register of Historic Places listings in Hemphill County, Texas
