= Zachariah T. Woodall =

- Grave at Arlington National Cemetery
- Born: September 1849; Alexandria, Virginia, U.S.
- Died: September 12, 1899 (aged 50); Cabana Fortress, Havana, Cuba
- Burial place: Arlington National Cemetery
- Military career
- Allegiance: United States
- Branch: United States Army
- Service years: c. 1874–1899
- Rank: Ordnance Sergeant
- Unit: 6th U.S. Cavalry
- Conflicts: Indian Wars; Spanish–American War
- Awards: Medal of Honor

Zachariah T. Woodall (September 1849 – September 12, 1899) was a soldier in the U.S. Army who served with the 6th U.S. Cavalry during the Red River War, and later in the Spanish–American War. He was one of six men who received the Medal of Honor who, while in command of an 8-man courier detail, engaged in a running battle with a hostile force of 125 Indians at the Washita River in Texas during the Battle of the Upper Washita on September 12, 1874.

== Biography ==
Born in Alexandria, Virginia in 1849, Zachariah T. Woodall enlisted in the U.S. Army following the American Civil War. Sent out west to the frontier, Woodall became an experienced Native American fighter and eventually reached the rank of sergeant. During the Red River War, he served on the Texas frontier with the 6th U.S. Cavalry. On the morning of September 12, 1874, Woodall led a 6-man courier detail including cavalry troopers Pvt. John Harrington, Pvt. Peter Roth, Pvt. George W. Smith, and civilian scouts Amos Chapman and Billy Dixon. They were assigned to find a supply train under Captain Wyllys Lyman and direct them to Colonel Nelson A. Miles' new encampment on McClellan Creek. On their way to the wagon train, Woodall and his men were suddenly ambushed and encircled by a force of 125 Native Americans at the Washita River.

Caught out in the open, and with virtually no cover, Woodall and his men dismounted and engaged the Native Americans. After four hours of fighting, they had lost their horses and all the soldiers had been wounded. Making their way to a nearby buffalo wallow, they continued fighting the Native Americans throughout the day and managed to hold the hostiles off despite being outnumbered 25-to-1. They were eventually found by members of the 8th U.S. Cavalry, then rescued by Colonel Miles' troops and brought to Fort Supply to recover from their wounds. All six men, including Woodall, were awarded the Medal of Honor for their participation in what would become known as the Battle of Buffalo Wallow.

Woodall remained in the military for the next 25 years. While serving in the Spanish–American War, he died at Cabana Fortress in Havana, Cuba on September 12, 1899. He was later interred at Arlington National Cemetery.

== Medal of Honor citation ==
Rank and organization: Sergeant, Company I, 6th U.S. Cavalry. Place and date: At Wichita River, Tex., 12 September 1874. Entered service at: ------. Birth: Alexandria, Va. Date of issue: 7 November 1874.

Citation:

While in command of 5 men and carrying dispatches, was attacked by 125 Indians, who, he with his command fought throughout the day, he being severely wounded.

== See also ==
- List of Medal of Honor recipients for the Indian Wars
- List of Medal of Honor recipients for the Spanish–American War
