= Billy Dixon =

American scout and bison hunter active in the Texas Panhandle

William "Billy" Dixon
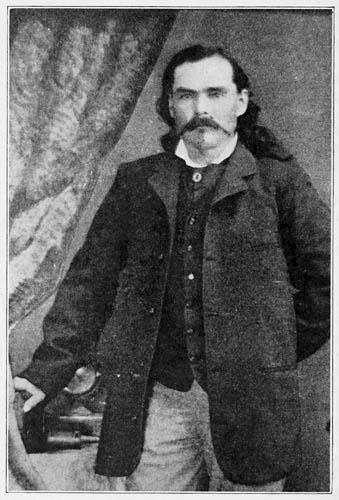
- William "Billy" Dixon as an Army Scout
- Born: September 25, 1850; Ohio County, Virginia (now West Virginia), U.S.
- Died: March 9, 1913 (aged 62); Cimarron County, Oklahoma, U.S.
- Burial place: Hutchinson County, Texas, U.S.
- Military career
- Allegiance: United States of America
- Rank: Civilian Scout
- Nickname: Billy Dixon
- Conflicts: Red River War; Second Battle of Adobe Walls; Battle of the Upper Washita River; Battle of Buffalo Wallow
- Awards: Awarded Medal of Honor as a civilian
- Other work: Hutchinson County Sheriff, Postmaster, and Justice of the Peace

William Dixon (September 25, 1850 – March 9, 1913) was an American scout and bison hunter active in the Texas Panhandle. He helped found Adobe Walls, fired a buffalo rifle shot at the Second Battle of Adobe Walls, and for his actions at the Buffalo Wallow Fight became one of eight civilians to be awarded the U.S. Medal of Honor.

== Early life ==
Dixon was born in Ohio County in the panhandle region of West Virginia, on September 25, 1850. Of European descent, he was orphaned at age 12 and lived with an uncle in Missouri for a year before setting out on his own. He worked in woodcutters' camps along the Missouri River until he started working at age 14 as an ox driver and a muleskinner for a government contractor in Leavenworth, Kansas.

He was a skilled marksman and occasionally scouted for eastern excursionists brought by the railroads. In 1869 he joined a venture in hunting and trapping on the Saline River northwest of Fort Hays in Kansas.

He scouted Texas as far south as the Salt Fork of the Red River when the bison hunters moved into the Texas Panhandle in 1874. He and his group hunted along the Canadian River and its tributaries.

== Second Battle of Adobe Walls ==
Dixon led the founders of Adobe Walls to the Texas Plains, where he knew bison were in abundance. The group of 28 men and one woman occupied the outpost of five buildings 15 miles northeast of Stinnett.

The outpost was attacked on June 27, 1874, by a band of 700–1200 Comanche, Cheyenne and Kiowa. The stand-off continued into a third day, when a small band of Comanche scouts were noticed less than a mile east of Adobe Walls. It is said that Dixon took aim with a quickly borrowed .50 Sharps buffalo rifle (as, according to his biography, he only had a .44 Sharps and felt it could not reach). He knocked one man off his horse, killing him. Understanding how far the guns could fire, the natives then withdrew and left the settlement alone. Dixon’s shot was measured at over 1,500 yards, earning him a position on the list of longest recorded sniper kills.

Dixon stated in his biography that it was a "scratch shot".

== Battle of Buffalo Wallow ==
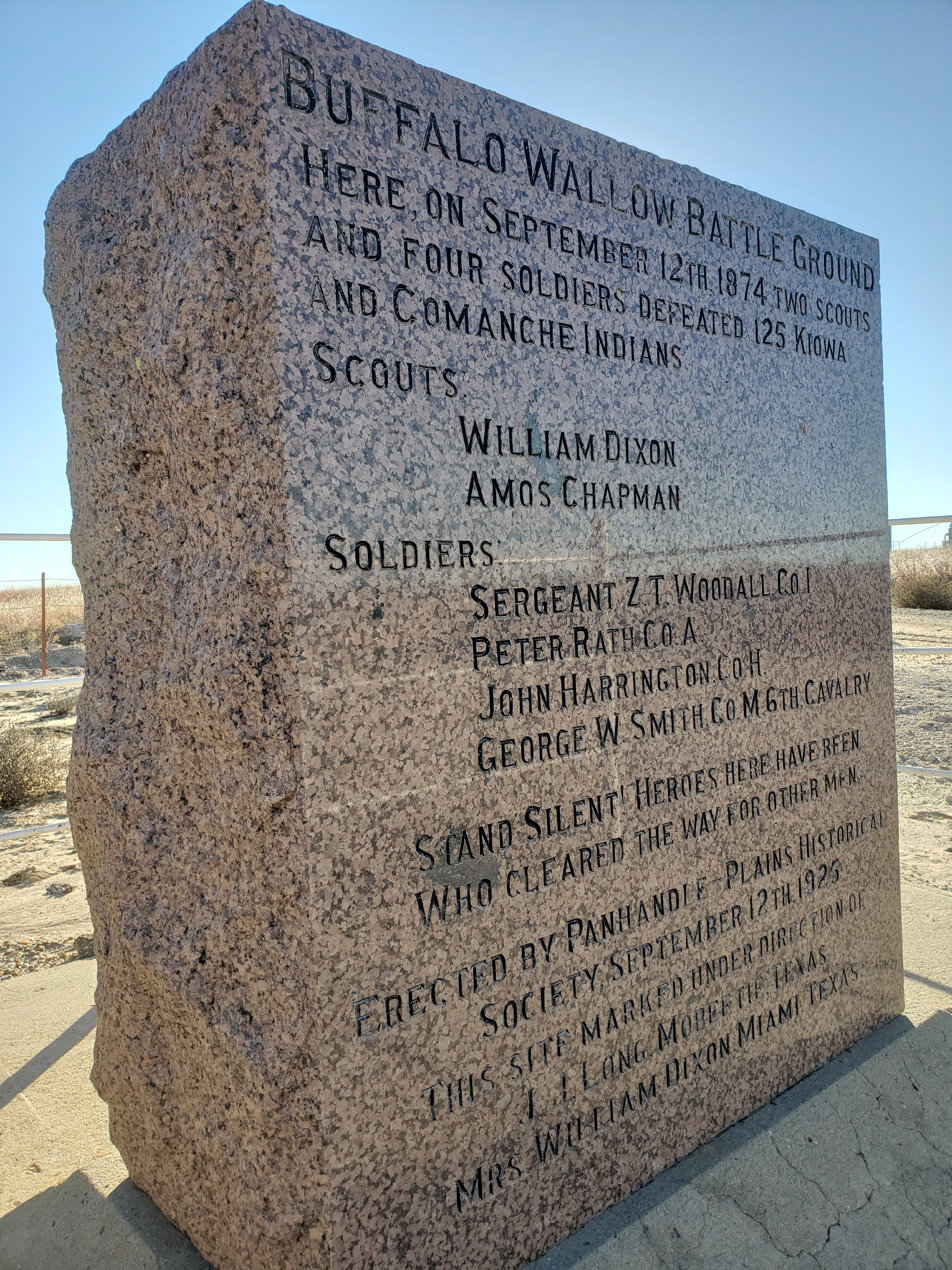
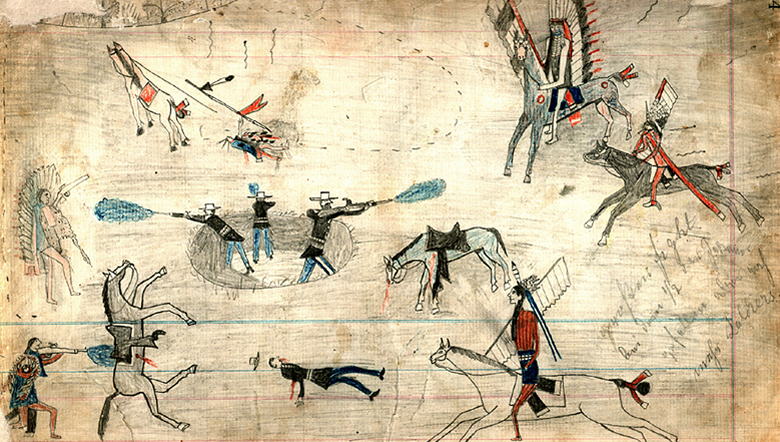
Texas historical marker at the site (top) and a Kiowa ledger drawing possibly depicting the battle (bottom)

On 12 September 1874, Dixon and another civilian scout, Amos Chapman, were carrying dispatches from McClellan Creek to Fort Supply with Sergeant Zachariah T. Woodall, Private Peter Roth, Private John Harrington, and Private George W. Smith, as part of General Nelson A. Miles Sixth Cavalry when they were encircled at sunrise by a "large band of Kiowa and Comanche warriors" near the Washita River.

Dismounting, George Smith was mortally wounded. Soon, Woodall, Harrington, Dixon and Chapman were wounded. All except Smith and Chapman had by noon made their way to a nearby bison wallow ten feet in diameter, where they used their hands and knives to throw up the sandy dirt all around the sides. Sitting upright, each man "fired deliberately, taking good aim, and were picking off an indian at almost every round." Dixon eventually ran for Chapman, whose left knee had been shattered, and carried him back to the wallow. By 3 PM, a thunderstorm brought rain and relief from their thirst, but when the wind "shifted to the north", the cold brought discomfort to all parties, especially the Natives who sat on their horses out of rifle range "with their blankets drawn tightly around them." Roth went for Smith's gun and ammunition, but when Smith was discovered still alive, Roth and Dixon brought Smith back to the wallow where he died during the night. At daylight, Dixon went for help, soon encountering troops under the command of Major Price. For their participation in what became known as the Battle of Buffalo Wallow or the Buffalo Wallow Fight, Woodall and the five men under his command were awarded the Medal of Honor.

The medal is presently on display at the Panhandle–Plains Historical Museum in Canyon, Texas. His medal along with that of Amos Chapman was revoked after a records review that was conducted from 1916-1917 found that they were ineligible because they were civilian scouts. In 1989 an Army Board of Correction of Records reinstated the awards.

A Texas Historical Marker documents the battle site.

== Later years and death ==
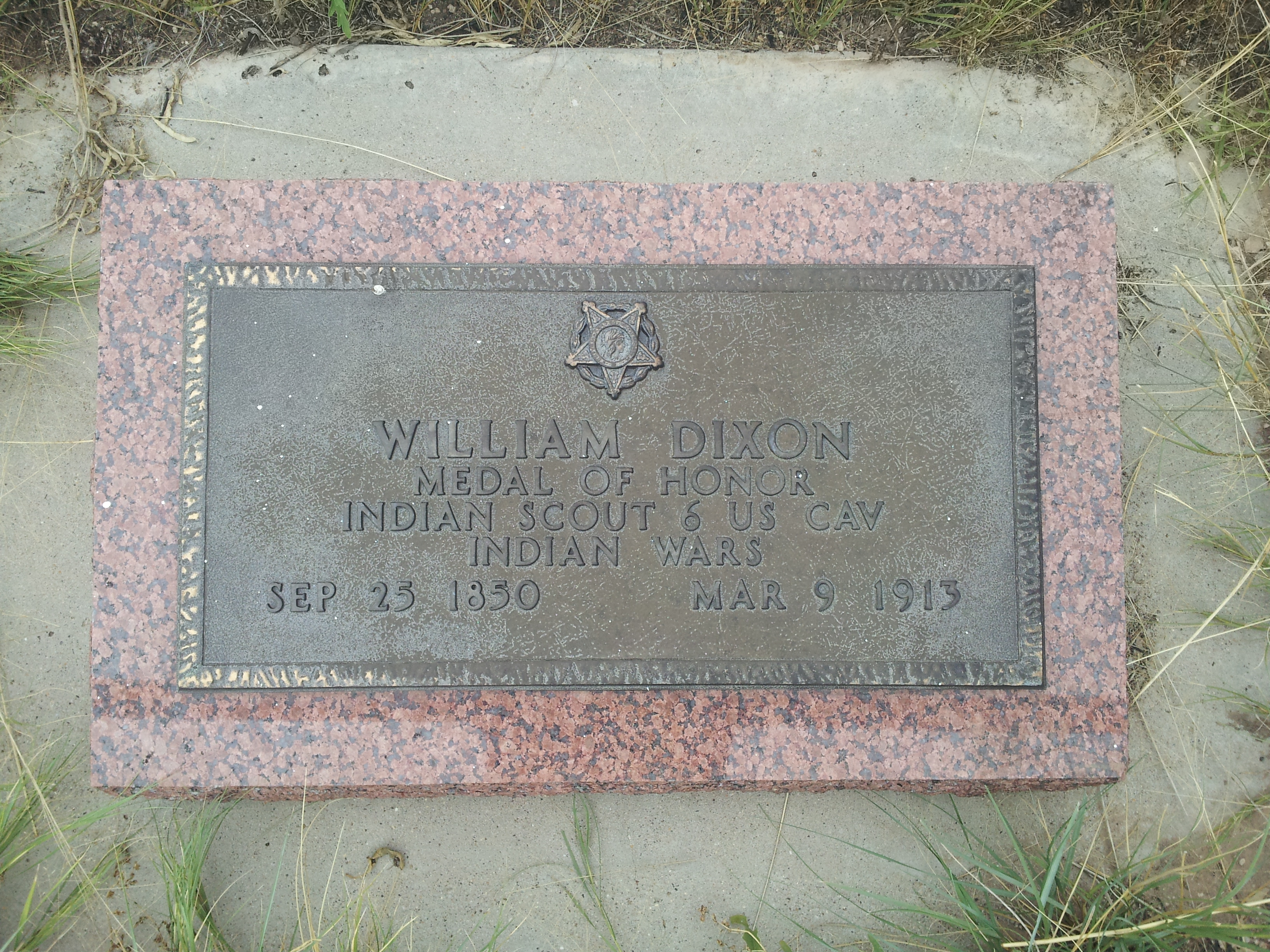
Billy Dixon's grave marker at Adobe Walls.

In 1883, Dixon returned to civilian life and built a home near the Adobe Walls site. He was postmaster there for 20 years and served as the first sheriff of newly formed Hutchinson County. He also served as state land commissioner and a justice of the peace.

In 1894, Dixon married Olive King Dixon of Virginia, who for nearly three years was the only woman in Hutchinson County. They had seven children. In 1902, the family moved to Plemons for schooling for their children. In 1906 they moved to Oklahoma.

Dixon died from pneumonia at his Cimarron County homestead in 1913 and was buried in Adobe Walls battle site in Hutchinson County. On his deathbed, he told Olive his complete life story, which she penned and later published. In 1929 his body was reinterred at Adobe Walls.

Dixon Creek in southern Hutchinson County was named for him, as is the Billy Dixon Masonic Lodge in Fritch. A plaque commemorating his Medal of Honor was formally dedicated in 1992. The Historical Breechloading Smallarms Association, England, holds a shooting competition to commemorate his incredible long-distance shot. Known as the Vintage Rifle Open Long Range Championships, it is shot at a distance of 1,000 yards using black-powder cartridge rifles of that era, and is strongly contested from shooters all over the United Kingdom.

== See also ==
- List of snipers
- List of Medal of Honor recipients
- List of Medal of Honor recipients for the Indian Wars

== Sources ==
- "Billy Dixon".
- "Red River War".
- Life of Billy Dixon - Author: Olive K. Dixon
- Gilbert, Miles; Remiger, Leo; Cunningham, Sharon. Encyclopedia of Buffalo Hunters and Skinners. Vol. 1: A-D; (2003) Pioneer Press, TN; ISBN 1-877704-37-7.
- Remiger, Leo; Gilbert, Miles; Cunningham, Sharon. Encyclopedia of Buffalo Hunters and Skinners. Vol. 2: E-K; (2006) Pioneer Press, TN; ISBN 1-877704-89-X.
- "The Handbook of Texas History: Buffalo Wallow Fight".
- "Texas Historical Commission: Hemphill County: Marker 565". Archived from the original on February 25, 2013.
- John L. McCarty. Adobe Walls Bride: The Story of Billy and Olive Dixon San Antonio, TX: Naylor, 1955.

Records
Preceded by Confederate Army sniper (name unknown)	Longest confirmed combat sniper-shot kill 1874-1967; 1,406 m (1,538 yd); Sharps .50-90 w/ .50-90 Sharps	Succeeded by Carlos Hathcock
