= Dixon Creek =

Dixon Creek may refer to:

== Places ==
- Dixons Creek, Victoria, a town in Victoria, Australia
- Dixon Lane-Meadow Creek, California, a census-designated place in Inyo County, California
- Dixon Creek Ranch, former name of part of the 6666 Ranch in Texas

== River ==
- Dixon Creek (creek), a creek in Texas

== Other uses ==
- Dickson Creek, a creek in California
