= John James (Medal of Honor) =

British-born American U.S. Army soldier and Medal of Honor recipient

- Born: c. 1838 near Manchester, England, U.K.
- Died: May 23, 1902 (aged 64); Washington, D.C., U.S.
- Burial place: United States Soldiers' and Airmen's Home National Cemetery
- Military career
- Allegiance: United States of America
- Branch: United States Army
- Service years: c. 1874–1875
- Rank: Corporal
- Unit: 5th U.S. Cavalry
- Conflicts: Indian Wars; Red River War
- Awards: Medal of Honor

John James (c. 1838 – May 23, 1902) was a British-born American soldier in the U.S. Army who served with the 5th U.S. Cavalry during the Indian Wars. He was one of seven men who received the Medal of Honor for gallantry during the Battle of the Upper Washita River near Canadian, Texas on September 9–11, 1874.

== Biography ==
John James was born near Manchester, England, in about 1838. After emigrating to the United States, he enlisted in the U.S. Army in Albany, New York. He became a member of the 5th U.S. Cavalry and participated in campaigns against the Plains Indians during the early-1870s.

== Battle of the Upper Washita River ==
On the morning of September 9, 1874, James was assigned to a small cavalry escort escorting a supply train to General Nelson Miles expedition force at Camp Supply. This train consisted of 36 wagons and was called Lyman's Wagon Train after Captain Wyllys Lyman, the officer heading the cavalry escort protecting the wagon train.

As the supply train emerged from a canyon on the Upper Washita River, they were set upon by a large Indian war party of Kiowa and Comanche. Despite the overwhelming numbers, the cavalry troopers fiercely resisted the hostiles. Although a battalion from the 8th U.S. Cavalry arrived on the second day, the defenders endured continuous gunfire and two major Indian assaults numbering over 400 warriors. With temperatures as high as 100 degrees, water became scarce and efforts to reach a nearby watering hole were made impossible while surrounded by the enemy. The soldiers held out for almost a week before help arrived on September 14, 1874.

James was one of seven soldiers cited for "gallantry in action" during the three-day battle and received the Medal of Honor on April 23, 1875. He died in Washington, D.C., on May 23, 1902, and is interred at the United States Soldiers' and Airmen's Home National Cemetery.

== Medal of Honor citation ==
Rank and organization: Corporal, 5th U.S. Infantry. Place and date: At Upper Wichita, Tex., 9–11 September 1874. Entered service at: ------. Birth: England. Date of issue: April 23, 1875.

Citation:

Gallantry in action.

== See also ==
- List of Medal of Honor recipients for the Indian Wars
