= William Wilkerson Morris =

American soldier and Medal of Honor recipient

William Wilkerson Morris (born about 1843) was an American soldier who was awarded the Medal of Honor for his actions from September 9 to 11, 1874, during the Battle of the Upper Washita River in the Red River War, a part of the American Indian Wars.

== Early life ==
William Wilkerson Morris was born in about 1843 in Stewart County, Tennessee, the youngest child of Nathan Gilbert Morris and Charlotte (Wallace) Morris of Stewart County.

In the 1860 U. S. Census., at age 17, he was living with his parents in Stewart County, working as a dry goods salesman.

== Military service ==
At age 29, on June 1, 1872, at Louisville, Kentucky, he enlisted in Company H, 6th U. S. Cavalry. His occupation was then noted as a bookkeeper. He was 5 feet, 8 1/2 inches tall, with hazel eyes, black hair and dark complexion.

From September 9–11, 1874, his Cavalry unit was engaged in battle with Native Americans at the Battle of the Upper Washita River in Texas, for which engagement he was awarded the Medal of Honor

In May 1876, the 6th Cavalry was ordered to Arizona Territory to relieve the 5th Cavalry. H Company took station at Fort Bowie, in Apache Pass south of Apache Spring.

The Arizona Weekly Citizen of August 12, 1876, reported the arrival in Tucson of Sgt. W. W. Morris on August 7. The October 1876 post report for Camp Lowell, Tucson, states that W. W. Morris, Q. M. Sgt., 6th Cavalry, had arrived at the post on August 8. While at Camp Lowell, he was again nominated for a Medal of Honor for an April 1875 engagement with the Cheyenne at Sappa Creek, Kansas. However, that nomination was withdrawn because he had so recently received the Medal.

Morris transferred to Camp Grant, Arizona Territory on November 1, 1876. On June 1, 1877, he was discharged at Camp Grant due to the expiration of his five-year service.

== Post-military life ==
William Wilkerson Morris was living at McMillanville, Maricopa County, Arizona Territory, on May 22, 1878, when he registered to vote. By October 14, 1878, he had moved to Picket Post, Pinal County, where he again registered to vote.

On July 9, 1880, William W. Morris and Jotham B. Hunt purchased the "Indianna" mine from the estate of Robert Gordan. The mine was located about 4–5 miles north of Picket Post.

By October 1882, Morris, age 40, had moved to Benson, Cochise County, Arizona Territory, registering to vote there on October 7. On August 13, 1884, age 43, he again signed the voter registration rolls in Benson, with his occupation being noted as notary public.

Morris' residence after 1884 and date/place of death are yet unknown.
