= Frank Singleton =

Frank Singleton may refer to:

- Frederick S. Neilon, also called Frank Singleton, American soldier and Medal of Honor recipient
- Frank Singleton (American football), American college football coach
