= Ordnance sergeant =

Ordnance sergeant was an enlisted rank in the U.S. Army from 1832 to 1920. The Confederate States Army also had an ordnance sergeant position during its existence. Ordnance sergeants were part of the Army's Ordnance Department and were in charge of the ordnance (weapons and ammunition) stores at a particular fort or other Army post. Often they led caretaker detachments or were the sole caretakers of ungarrisoned fortifications and other facilities. In both armies the rank insignia consisted of three inverted chevrons with a 5-pointed star above it.

== Ordnance sergeants in the United States Army ==
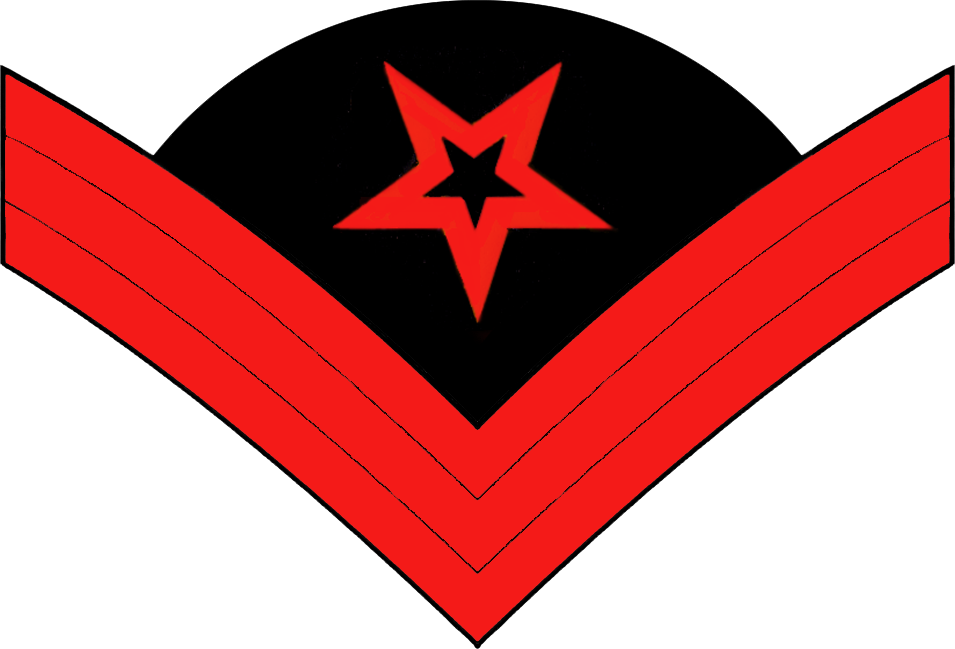
US Army ordnance sergeant rank insignia 1873–1902

The United States Congress authorized ordnance sergeants in 1832. There were 44 of them on duty by 1833. Ordnance sergeant was eliminated as a rank by War Department Circular No. 303 on 5 August 1920. The top twenty-five percent of the ordnance sergeants were converted to master sergeants and the remainder were converted to technical sergeants.

Ordnance Sergeant Mark Wentworth Smith, a Mexican–American War veteran who was wounded at the Battle of Chapultepec, was a caretaker at several forts, including Fort Adams, Rhode Island from 1859 to 1863 and Fort Griswold, Connecticut from 1863 to 1879. Sergeant Smith died in 1879 at the age of 76, the oldest active duty enlisted soldier in the history of the Army.

=== Duties and responsibilities ===
Provisions of the United States Army Regulations of 1861 affected ordnance sergeants, as well as other soldiers. The Secretary of War selected ordnance sergeants from the sergeants of the line of the Army. A nominee had to be recommended by his chain of command. Nominees must have served eight years, of which four had to be as a non-commissioned officer. The number of ordnance sergeants could not exceed one per military post." An ordnance sergeant ranked below a quartermaster sergeant of a regiment and above a first sergeant. An ordnance sergeant was responsible for the care of the ordnance, arms, ammunition and other military stores on a post.

- Paragraph 134: "Ordnance Sergeants will be assigned to posts [not regiments] when appointed, and are not to be transferred to other stations except by orders from the Adjutant-General's office."
- Paragraph 138: "When a non-commissioned officer receives the appointment of Ordnance Sergeant, he shall be dropped from the rolls of the regiment or company in which he may be serving at the time."
- Paragraph 142: "Ordnance Sergeants are to be considered as belonging to the non-commissioned staff of the post, under the orders of the commanding officer. They are to wear the uniform of the Ordnance Department, with the distinctive badges prescribed for the non-commissioned staff of regiments of artillery; and they are to appear under arms with the troops at all reviews and inspections, monthly and weekly."
- Paragraph 895: Ordnance sergeants who were convicted by courts martial could be discharged but could not be reduced in grade.

=== Medal of Honor recipients ===
Ten of the fifteen members of the Ordnance Corps who have received Medals of Honor served as ordnance sergeants at some point in their careers.

- Private Albert Knaak, Arizona Territory, 1868
- Private Solon D. Neal, Little Washita River, Texas, 1870
- Corporal John Kelly, Upper Washita, Texas, 1874
- First Sergeant John Mitchell, Upper Washita, Texas. 1874
- Sergeant Zachariah Woodall, Washita River, Texas, 1874
- First Sergeant Michael McGann, Rosebud River, Montana, 1876
- First Sergeant Henry Wilkens, Little Muddy Creek, Montana and Camas Meadows, Idaho, 1877
- Sergeant Milden H. Wilson, Big Hole, Montana, 1877
- First Sergeant Moses Williams, Cuchillo Negro Mountains, New Mexico, 1881
- First Sergeant Frederick E. Toy, Wounded Knee Creek, South Dakota, 1890

== Ordnance sergeants in the Confederate Army ==
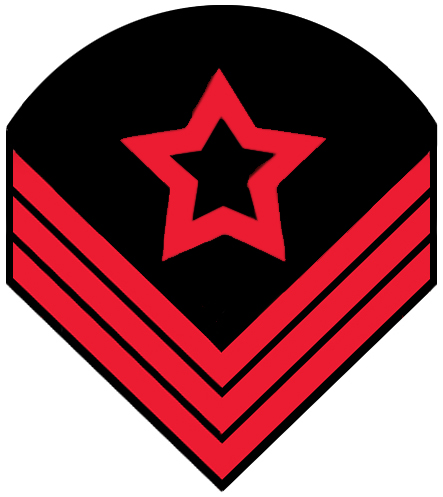
Confederate ordnance sergeant rank insignia

The Confederate States Army authorized the rank of ordnance sergeant on 16 April 1862. Every regimental commanding officer was required to select one of his non-commissioned officers best qualified for the position of ordnance sergeant, appoint him to the position of acting ordnance sergeant, and report all appointments to the chief of the ordnance bureau.

During the entire civil war the Confederate Ordnance Bureau was commanded by Colonel (later Brig. Gen.) Josiah Gorgas. Provisions of the General Order 24 dated 16 April 1862 affecting ordnance sergeants included:

- Paragraph V: "Such non-commissioned officer will have charge of all the surplus ordnance stores of the regiment, and will make returns of the same to the Ordnance Bureau. The arms and accouterments of the sick and disabled of the regiment will be turned over to and be accounted for by him. He will exercise supervision over the arms and ammunition in the hands of the men, and report any waste or damage to the division ordnance officer through the colonel of the regiment."

The Chief of Ordnance specified the following "Duties of Ordnance Sergeants:

*1. "To obey the direction of the division ordnance officer of the brigade ordnance officer (if the brigade is a separate command) in all relative to care and preservation of arms and duties connected therewith."

- 2. "To take charge of all supplies, arms, and ammunition of the regiment and make returns of the same according to "Ordnance regulations." Issues to be made on written requisitions approved by the colonel or commanding officer of the regiment; which requisitions are to be filed with his Return of property."
- 3. "To take charge of the ordnance wagon or wagons attached to each regiments, and to see that it always contains at least fifteen rounds per man of the regiment—surplus arms or accouterments to be turned over to the brigade or division ordnance officer."
- 4. "To supervise the condition of the arms of the regiment and get a detail of at least two mechanics to assist him in the necessary repairs to the arms, an account of these repairs to be kept as far as possible against each man of the regiment; repairs to be made on the order of the colonel of the regiment."
- 5. "To take charge of the arms and accouterments of the sick of the regiments in hospitals, which will be kept until the sick are sent to the general hospital, when their arms be turned over to the brigade or division depots."
- 6. "In battle it will be the duty of the ordnance-sergeants to remain with the ammunition wagons and act with the details assigned to them from the regiments, under the orders of the ordnance officer, in supplying the troops with ammunition, collecting arms of the killed and wounded, and securing captured arms and ammunition."

Provisions of the General Order 46, dated 1 July 1862 included:

- 3."Ordnance-sergeants of regiments will be subject to and make reports to the brigade ordnance officers."
- 4."Since the act of April 19, 1862, providing an ordnance-sergeant to each regiment, the acting appointees, authorized under General Orders, No. 24, current series, and made by colonels of regiments, will be reported for appointment under the above act in cases where such report has not been made to the Ordnance Bureau. Hereafter the appointment will be made to regiments as to military posts, by the Secretary of War, and upon the recommendation of colonels of regiments, through the Ordnance Bureau, the non-commissioned officers recommended being at once placed upon duty in anticipation of the appointment."

General Order 59 dated 12 May 1863 revoked the responsibility of ordnance sergeants to render reports to the ordnance bureau and transferred that responsibility to regimental commanders.

A fundamental difference between the Union Army and the Confederate ordnance sergeants was that the later belonged to the staffs of regiments and not just to posts. Confederate Army Regulations of 1863 quoted the U.S. Army Regulations word for word, save for the section on dress. According to that section, the ordnance sergeant would supposedly wear red trim and chevrons as the artillery branch of the service. While Union ordnance sergeants were few in number and marked by a distinctive uniform, Confederate ordnance sergeants were as numerous as Confederate infantry regiments, whose colors they may have also adopted despite regulations.
