= Frederick S. Neilon =

- Born: June 22, 1846; Boston, Massachusetts, U.S.
- Died: September 13, 1916 (aged 70); Boston, Massachusetts
- Burial place: Saint Paul's Cemetery
- Military career
- Allegiance: United States of America; Union
- Branch: United States Army; Union Army
- Service years: 1864–1867; 1872–1875
- Rank: Sergeant
- Unit: 6th U.S. Cavalry
- Conflicts: American Civil War; Indian Wars; Red River War; Battle of the Upper Washita
- Awards: Medal of Honor

Frederick S. Neilon (June 22, 1846 – September 13, 1916), also called Frank Singleton, was an American soldier in the U.S. Army who served with the 6th U.S. Cavalry during the Red River War. He received the Medal of Honor for gallantry fighting Indians at the Upper Washita River on September 9–11, 1874.

== Biography ==
Frederick S. Neilon was born in Boston, Massachusetts on June 22, 1846. Primarily raised and educated in Boston, he was encouraged by his mother to pursue a career in business. He completed his business studies in 1864 but, despite his mother's objections, decided to enlist in the Union Army as a second-class private in the ordnance corps at the Watertown Arsenal on March 31, 1864, and remained there for the duration of the American Civil War. After three years working on ordnance development and logistics for the military, he was honorably discharged as a first-class private on March 31, 1867. He was soon hired by the W.E. Jarvis Company in Boston and worked as a machinist and clerk for the next five years. In the summer of 1872, however, he left his job due to the lack of advancement in the company. He travelled west to Chicago hoping to find a better position but, unable to find work, he instead reenlisted in the U.S. Army under the alias Frank Singleton on August 11, 1872.

Neilon was initially stationed at Fort Riley, Kansas, and later at Fort Wallace and Fort Dodge. In July 1874, Neilon was joined the 6th U.S. Cavalry at Fort Dodge for General Nelson A. Miles expedition against the Kiowa, Comanche, and the Southern Cheyenne in the Indian Territory and northwestern Texas. It was during this expedition that Neilon saw action at the Battle of Palo Duro Canyon on August 30, 1874, and at the Battle of the Upper Washita River on September 9–12, 1874. In the latter engagement, he was wounded in the leg while carrying ammunition under heavy fire to outlying defensive positions. He received the Medal of Honor for "gallantry in action", however, he was forced to retire due to the severity of his leg injury and was discharged on a certificate of disability on May 6, 1875. Neilon died in Boston on September 13, 1916, and buried at Saint Paul's Cemetery in Arlington, Massachusetts.

== Medal of Honor citation ==
Rank and organization: Sergeant, Company A, 6th U.S. Cavalry. Place and date: At Upper Washita, Tex., 9–11 September 1874. Entered service at:------. Birth: Boston, Mass. Date of issue: 23 April 1875.

Citation:

Gallantry in action.

== See also ==
- List of Medal of Honor recipients for the Indian Wars
