= Hemphill County, Texas =

County in Texas, United States

- County
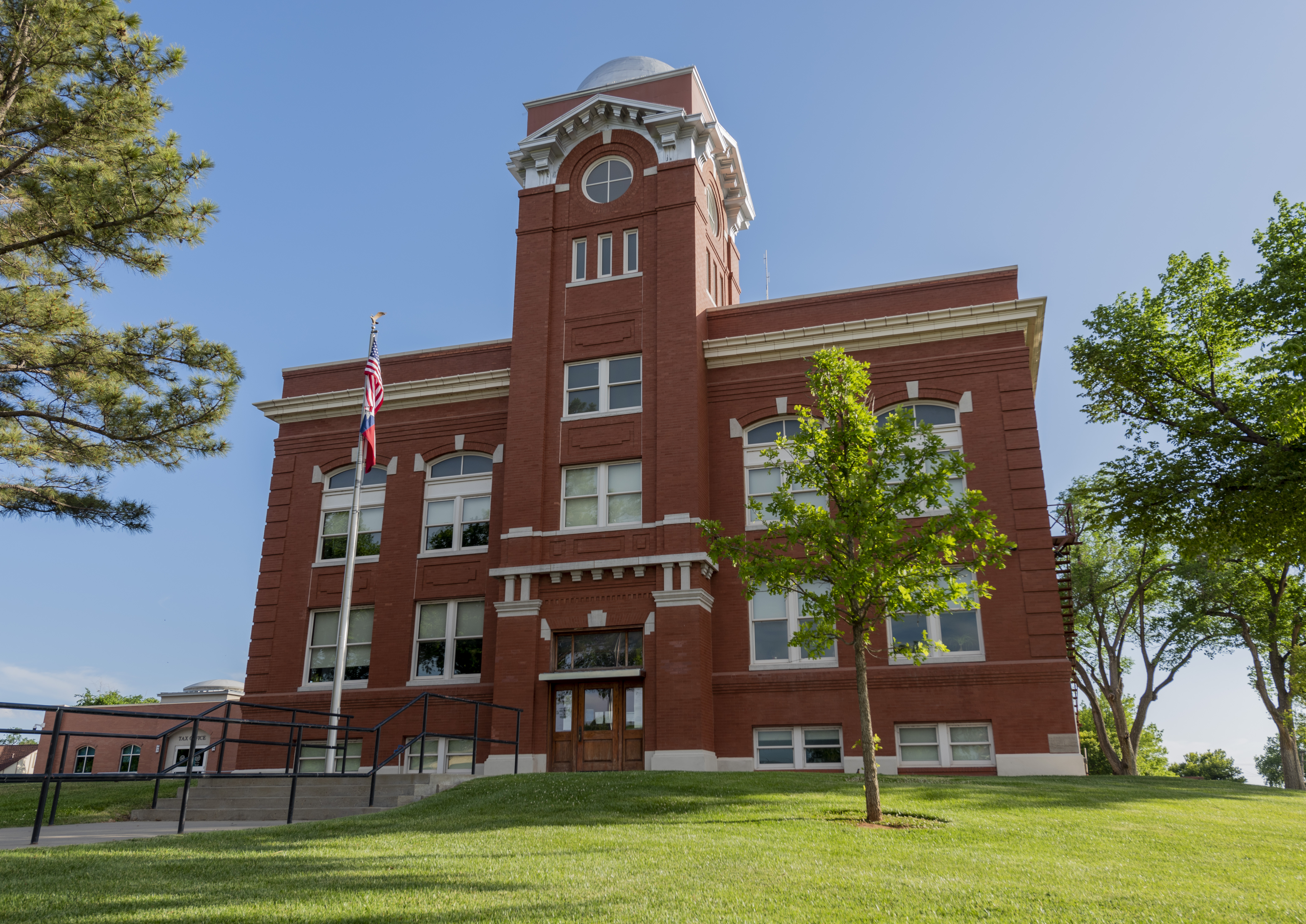
- Hemphill County Courthouse in Canadian

- Location within the U.S. state of Texas
- Coordinates: 35°50′N 100°17′W
- Country: United States
- State: Texas
- Founded: 1887
- Named for: John Hemphill
- Seat: Canadian
- Largest city: Canadian

Area
  - Total: 912 sq mi (2,360 km^{2})
  - Land: 906 sq mi (2,350 km^{2})
  - Water: 5.9 sq mi (15 km^{2}) 0.6%

Population (2020)
  - Total: 3,382
  - Estimate (2025): 3,083 ▼
  - Density: 3.73/sq mi (1.44/km^{2})
- Time zone: UTC−6 (Central)
  - Summer (DST): UTC−5 (CDT)
- Congressional district: 13th
- Website: www.co.hemphill.tx.us

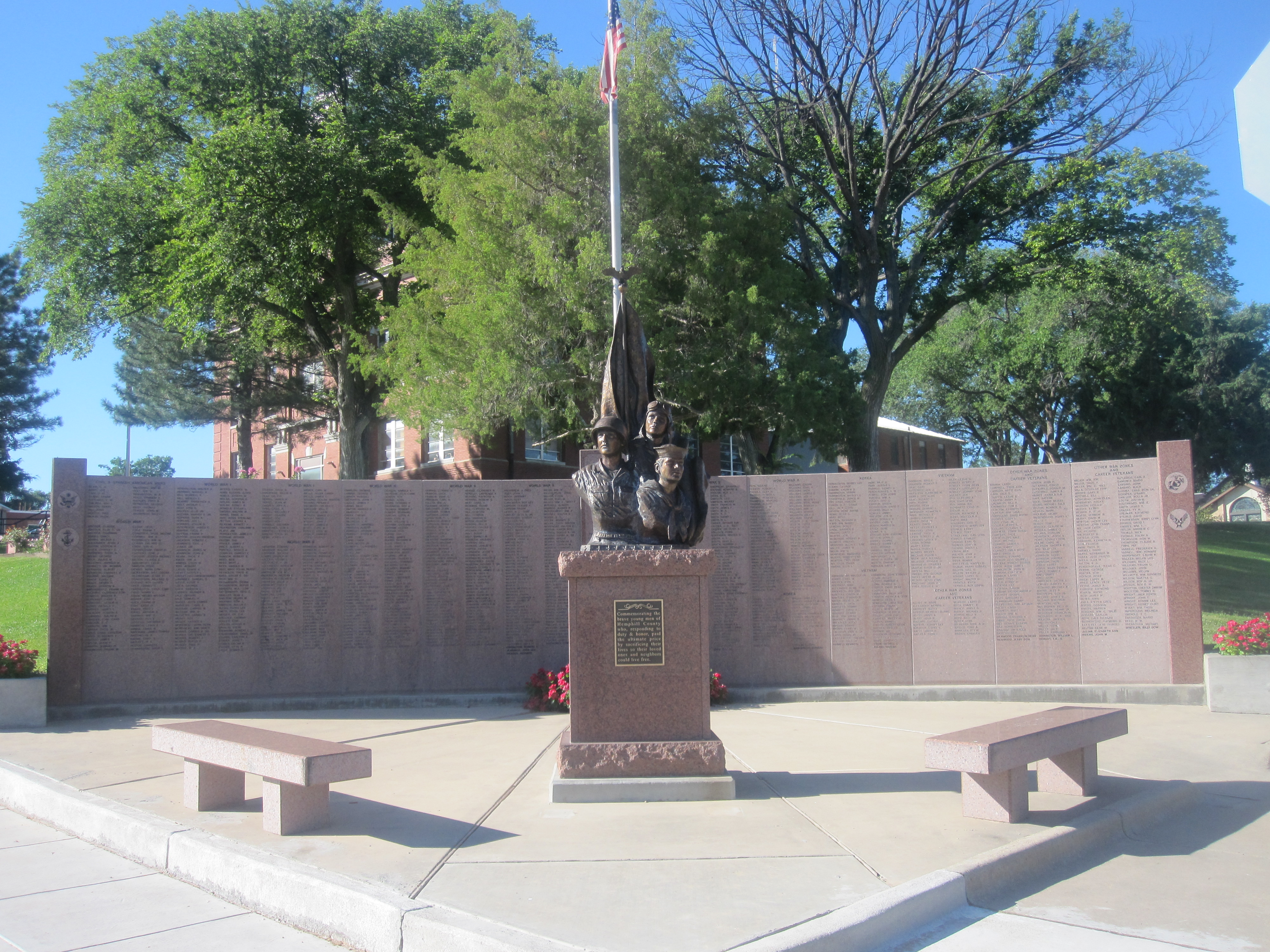
Military monument at Hemphill County Courthouse

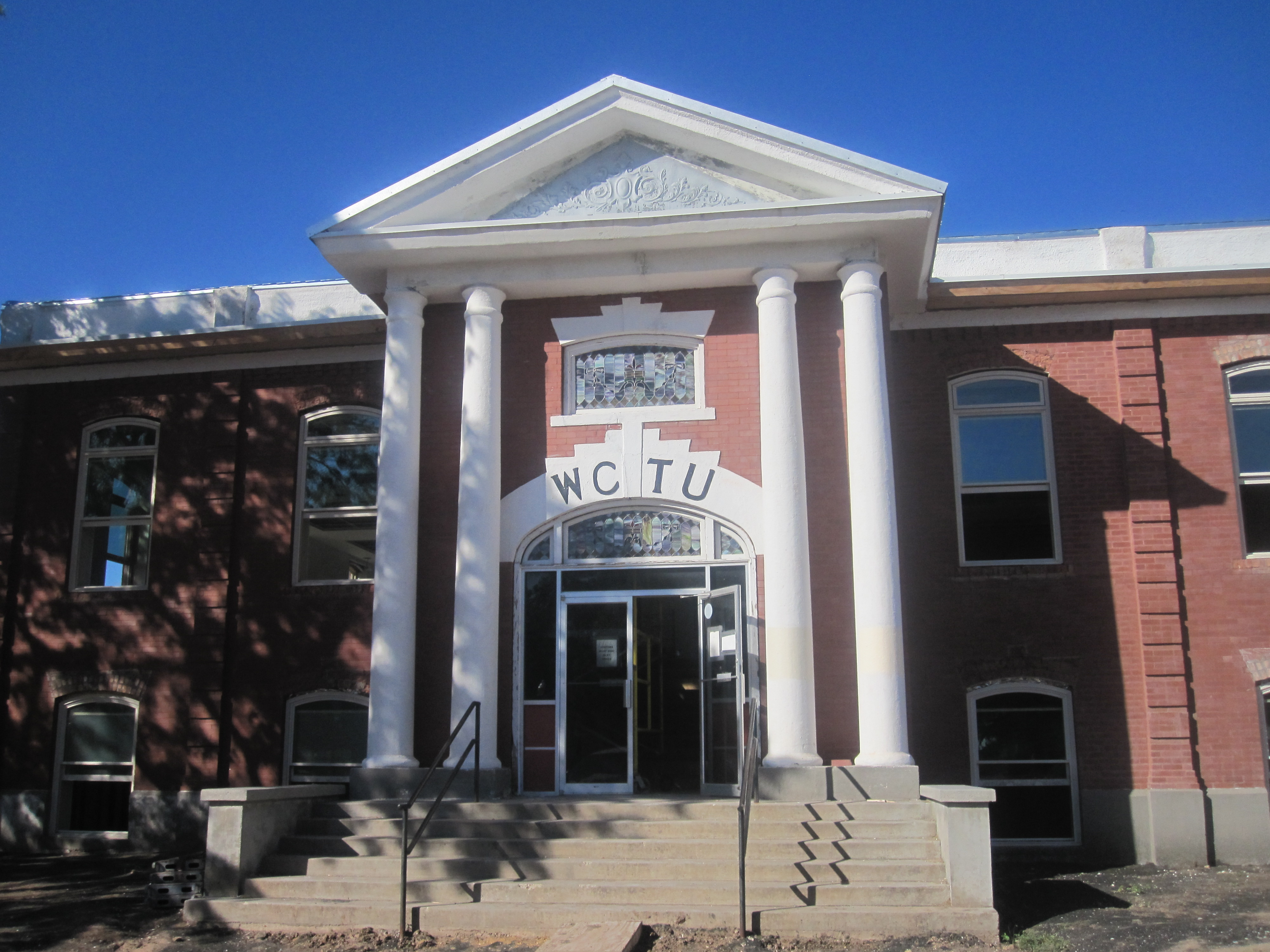
The former Woman's Christian Temperance Union building in Canadian is being converted into a new Hemphill County Library.

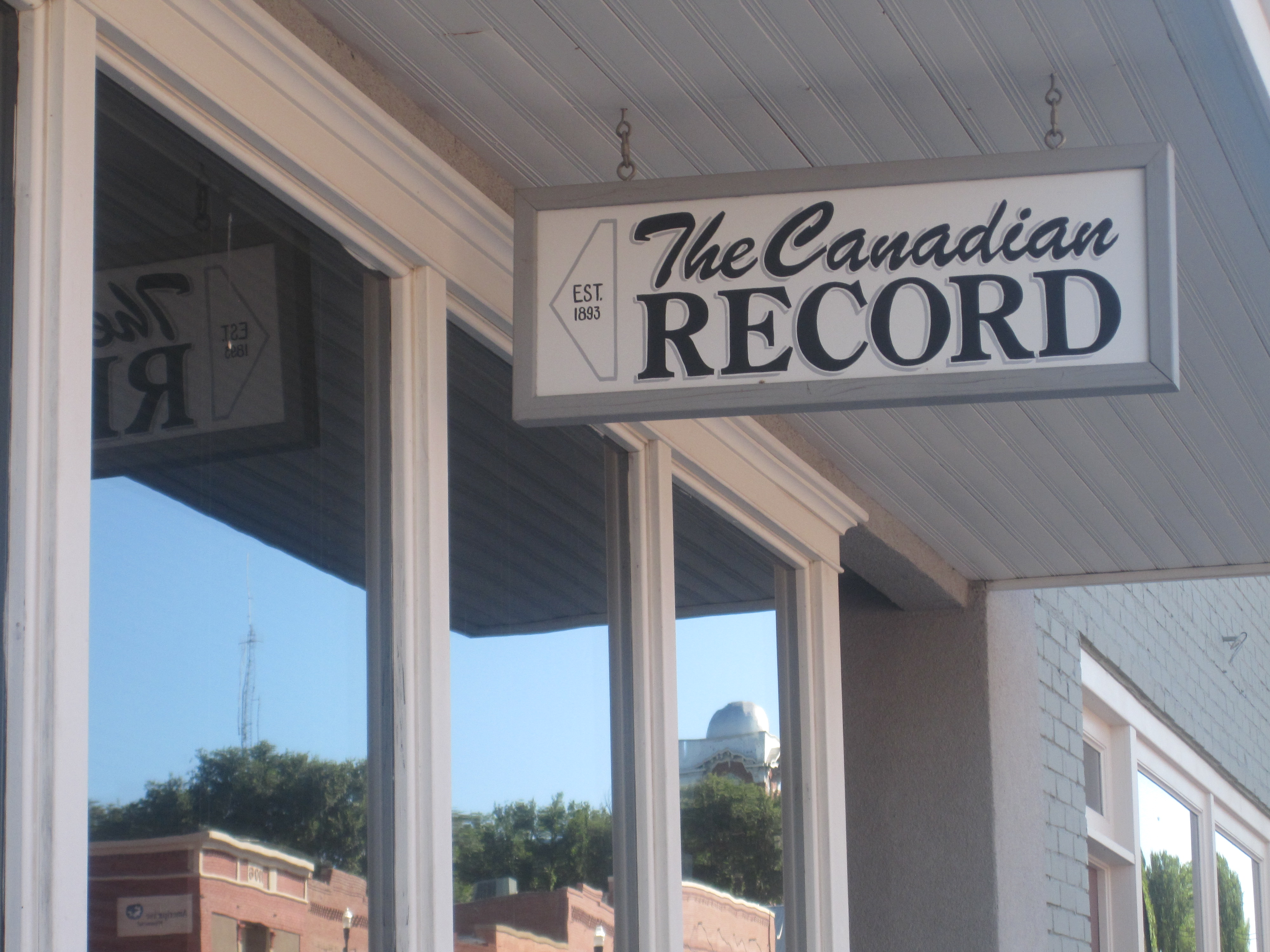
Canadian Record newspaper office serves Hemphill County.

Hemphill County is a county located in the U.S. state of Texas. As of the 2020 census, its population was 3,382. The county seat and only incorporated community in the county is the city of Canadian. The county was created in 1876 and organized in 1887. It is named for John Hemphill, a judge and Confederate congressman. Hemphill County is the most recent Texas county to permit alcohol sales.

== History ==
=== Early history ===
For the 200 years leading up to 1875, nomadic Indian tribes representing the Apache, Comanche, Kiowa, and others roamed the Panhandle following the huge bison (buffalo) herds. In search for an alternate route to California through Santa Fe, New Mexico, Josiah Gregg (1840), and Captain Randolph B. Marcy (1845) surveyed trails that crossed Hemphill County, following the south bank of the Canadian River.

The 1874–75 Red River War was an effort by the United States Army to force the Indians of the Southern Plains to move to Indian Territory in present-day Oklahoma. Two major battles took place in what would become Hemphill County - the Battle of Lyman's Wagon Train and the Battle of Buffalo Wallow.

On April 12, 1879, Wheeler County became the first organized county in the Panhandle, with 14 other unorganized counties attached to it, one of which was Hemphill County. Hemphill County was organized in July 1887.

=== Influence of Santa Fe Railroad ===
In 1886, the Southern Kansas Railway Company, a Santa Fe subsidiary, began to build a rail line into the Panhandle of Texas. The tracks entered Hemphill County during 1887 and further encouraged settlement in the area, creating three town sites: Mendota, Canadian, and Glazier.

In 1907, Canadian was designated a division point by the Santa Fe, a factor that brought diversification to the previously ranching economy of the area. The Santa Fe influence remained very strong until the mid-1950s, when the railway moved its employees to Amarillo.

Meanwhile, Hemphill County was roughly the midway point of two smaller lines, the Clinton and Oklahoma Western Railroad Company and the Clinton-Oklahoma-Western Railroad Company of Texas.

=== Oil production ===
During the 1970s, the county grew due to a rapid expansion of oil production. Though oil was discovered in the county in 1955, production remained relatively small because the technology had not yet progressed to efficiently capture the very deep reserves known to exist. By 1974, oil production had reached 999,000 barrels (158,800 m^{3}) and more than 1,891,000 bbl (300,600 m^{3}) in 1978. In 2000, about 505,000 bbl (80,300 m^{3}) of oil and more than 8 billion cubic feet of natural gas were produced in the county, but the future looked very bright.

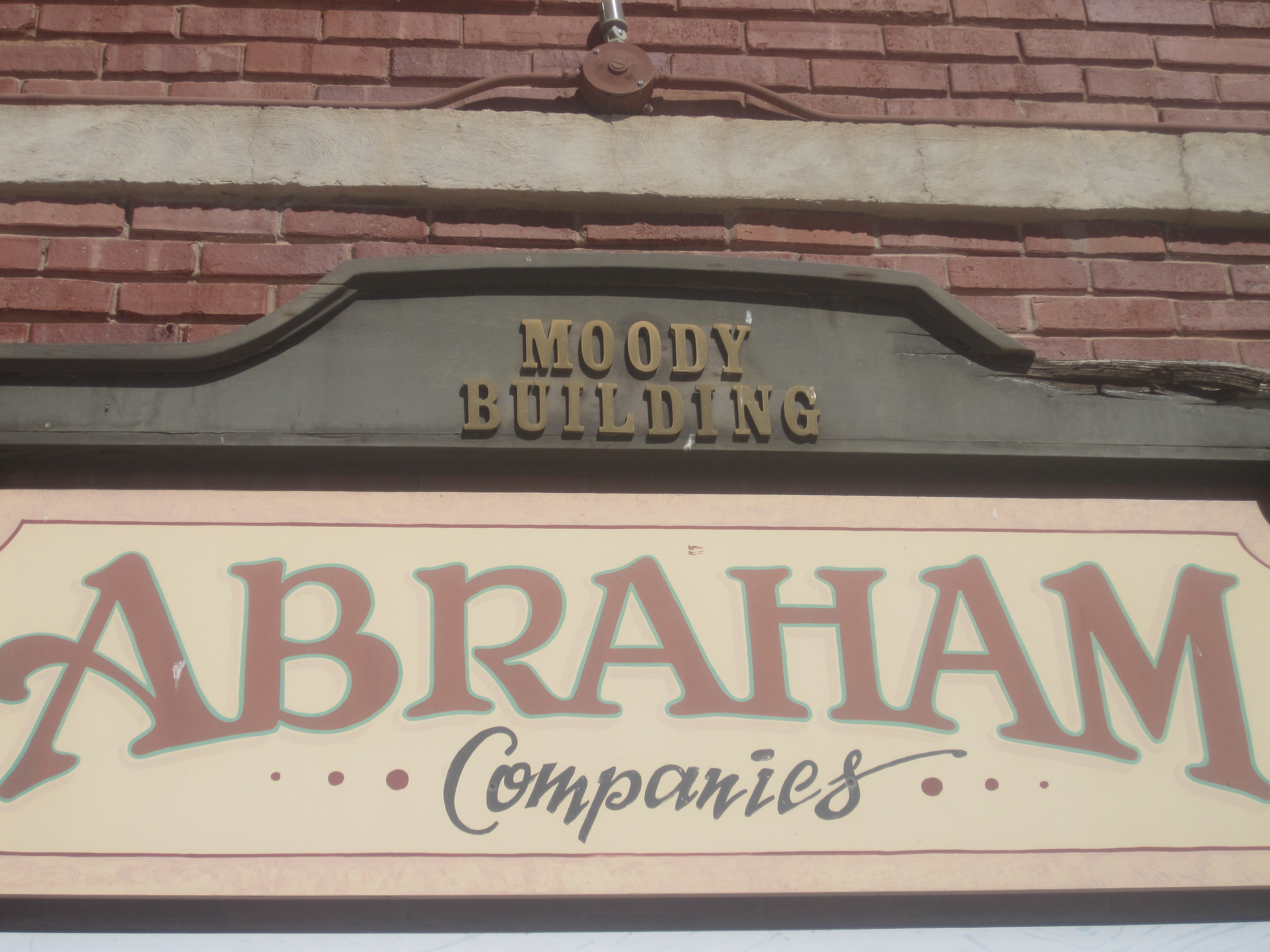
The Abraham Companies are based in the Moody Building, a former hotel in Canadian.

== Geography ==
According to the U.S. Census Bureau, the county has a total area of 912 sq mi (2,360 km^{2}), of which 5.9 sq mi (15 km^{2}) (0.6%) are covered by water.

=== Major highways ===
- U.S. Highway 60
- U.S. Highway 83
- State Highway 33

=== Adjacent counties ===
- Lipscomb County (north)
- Ellis County, Oklahoma (northeast)
- Roger Mills County, Oklahoma (southeast)
- Wheeler County (south)
- Roberts County (west)
- Gray County (southwest)

=== National protected area ===
- Black Kettle National Grassland (part)

== Demographics ==
Historical population
Census	Pop.	Note	%±
1880	149		—
1890	519		248.3%
1900	815		57.0%
1910	3,170		289.0%
1920	4,280		35.0%
1930	4,637		8.3%
1940	4,170		−10.1%
1950	4,123		−1.1%
1960	3,185		−22.8%
1970	3,084		−3.2%
1980	5,304		72.0%
1990	3,720		−29.9%
2000	3,351		−9.9%
2010	3,807		13.6%
2020	3,382		−11.2%
2025 (est.)	3,083	▼	−8.8%
U.S. Decennial Census; 1850–1900 1910; 1920 1930 1940; 1950 1960 1970; 1980 1990 2000; 2010 2020

Hemphill County, Texas – Racial and ethnic composition Note: the US Census treats Hispanic/Latino as an ethnic category. This table excludes Latinos from the racial categories and assigns them to a separate category. Hispanics/Latinos may be of any race.
Race / Ethnicity (NH = Non-Hispanic)	Pop 2000	Pop 2010	Pop 2020	% 2000	% 2010	% 2020
White alone (NH)	2,722	2,656	2,090	81.23%	69.77%	61.80%
Black or African American alone (NH)	52	4	4	1.55%	0.11%	0.12%
Native American or Alaska Native alone (NH)	22	12	18	0.66%	0.32%	0.53%
Asian alone (NH)	9	18	10	0.27%	0.47%	0.30%
Pacific Islander alone (NH)	1	3	0	0.03%	0.08%	0.00%
Other race alone (NH)	5	0	4	0.15%	0.00%	0.12%
Mixed race or multiracial (NH)	18	28	119	0.54%	0.74%	3.52%
Hispanic or Latino (any race)	522	1,086	1,137	15.58%	28.53%	33.62%
Total	3,351	3,807	3,382	100.00%	100.00%	100.00%

=== 2020 census ===
As of the 2020 census, the county had a population of 3,382 and the median age was 38.1 years; 29.2% of residents were under 18 and 16.9% were 65 older. For every 100 females, there were 98.8 males, and for every 100 females 18 and over, there were 96.4 males 18 and over.

The racial makeup of the county was 70.1% White, 0.1% Black or African American, 0.9% American Indian and Alaska Native, 0.3% Asian, <0.1% Native Hawaiian and Pacific Islander, 14.8% from some other race, and 13.8% from two or more races. Hispanic or Latino residents of any race comprised 33.6% of the population.

About 0.1% of residents lived in urban areas, while the rest lived in rural areas.

Of the 1,243 households in the county, 39.7% had children under 18 living in them, 62.8% were married-couple households, 15.8% were households with a male householder and no spouse or partner present, and 18.7% were households with a female householder and no spouse or partner present. About 21.5% of all households were made up of individuals, and 11.0% had someone living alone who was 65 or older.

The city had 1,631 housing units, of which 23.8% were vacant. Among occupied housing units, 77.0% were owner-occupied and 23.0% were renter-occupied. The homeowner vacancy rate was 3.1% and the rental vacancy rate was 32.7%.

=== 2000 census ===
As of the 2000 census, 3,351 people, 1,280 households, and 948 families resided in the county. The population density was four people per square mile (1.5 people/km^{2}). The 1,548 housing units averaged 2 per square mile (0.77/km^{2}). The racial makeup of the county was 87.65% White, 1.55% Black or African American, 0.72% Native American, 0.27% Asian, 0.03% Pacific Islander, 8.48% from other races, and 1.31% from two or more races. About 15.6% of the population were Hispanic or Latino of any race.

Of the 1,280 households, 32.7% had children under 18 living with them, 65.2% were married couples living together, 5.9% had a female householder with no husband present, and 25.9% were not families. About 24.4% of all households were made up of individuals, and 12.0% had someone living alone who was 65 or older. The average household size was 2.50, and the average family size was 2.98.

In the county, the population was distributed as 28.0% under 18, 6.5% from 18 to 24, 25.3% from 25 to 44, 25.4% from 45 to 64, and 14.7% who were 65 or older. The median age was 39 years. For every 100 females, there were 101.3 males. For every 100 females 18 and over, there were 92.2 males.

The median income in the county for a household was $35,456 and for a family was $42,036. Males had a median income of $31,154 versus $19,423 for females. The per capita income for the county was $16,929. About 10.9% of families and 12.6% of the population were below the poverty line, including 16.7% of those under 18 and 12.8% of those 65 or over.

== Communities ==
- Canadian (county seat)
- Glazier

== Politics ==
During the period 1912 through the 1940s, Democratic candidates at the presidential level predominated in Hemphill County, the exception being 1928. From 1952, Republicans have held sway, losing the county only in the 1964 landslide by native son Lyndon Johnson. Hemphill County is located within District 88 of the Texas House of Representatives and District 31 of the Texas Senate.

United States presidential election results for Hemphill County, Texas
Year	Republican		Democratic		Third party(ies)	
Year	No.	%	No.	%	No.	%
1912	61	11.60%	312	59.32%	153	29.09%
1916	141	20.89%	496	73.48%	38	5.63%
1920	253	37.32%	417	61.50%	8	1.18%
1924	167	25.97%	405	62.99%	71	11.04%
1928	489	60.67%	317	39.33%	0	0.00%
1932	133	12.64%	918	87.26%	1	0.10%
1936	121	10.67%	1,008	88.89%	5	0.44%
1940	170	16.38%	868	83.62%	0	0.00%
1944	274	23.97%	792	69.29%	77	6.74%
1948	201	17.06%	930	78.95%	47	3.99%
1952	892	60.19%	590	39.81%	0	0.00%
1956	620	60.67%	401	39.24%	1	0.10%
1960	847	71.72%	333	28.20%	1	0.08%
1964	563	46.41%	649	53.50%	1	0.08%
1968	699	53.77%	400	30.77%	201	15.46%
1972	942	81.42%	214	18.50%	1	0.09%
1976	858	54.37%	707	44.80%	13	0.82%
1980	1,152	64.72%	592	33.26%	36	2.02%
1984	1,650	79.83%	413	19.98%	4	0.19%
1988	1,170	68.62%	527	30.91%	8	0.47%
1992	989	58.18%	479	28.18%	232	13.65%
1996	986	68.57%	344	23.92%	108	7.51%
2000	1,203	81.61%	251	17.03%	20	1.36%
2004	1,380	83.99%	257	15.64%	6	0.37%
2008	1,345	85.67%	216	13.76%	9	0.57%
2012	1,298	86.02%	192	12.72%	19	1.26%
2016	1,462	85.80%	181	10.62%	61	3.58%
2020	1,486	86.40%	206	11.98%	28	1.63%
2024	1,412	87.59%	190	11.79%	10	0.62%

United States Senate election results for Hemphill County, Texas1
Year	Republican		Democratic		Third party(ies)	
Year	No.	%	No.	%	No.	%
2024	1,380	86.30%	195	12.20%	24	1.50%

United States Senate election results for Hemphill County, Texas2
Year	Republican		Democratic		Third party(ies)	
Year	No.	%	No.	%	No.	%
2020	1,465	86.53%	197	11.64%	31	1.83%

Texas Gubernatorial election results for Hemphill County
Year	Republican		Democratic		Third party(ies)	
Year	No.	%	No.	%	No.	%
2022	1,198	88.02%	138	10.14%	25	1.84%

== See also ==
- Dry counties
- List of museums in the Texas Panhandle
- National Register of Historic Places listings in Hemphill County, Texas
- Recorded Texas Historic Landmarks in Hemphill County
