= National Register of Historic Places listings in Hemphill County, Texas =

Location of Hemphill County in Texas

This is a list of the National Register of Historic Places listings in Hemphill County, Texas.

This is intended to be a complete list of properties listed on the National Register of Historic Places in Hemphill County, Texas. There is one property listed on the National Register in the county.

This National Park Service list is complete through NPS recent listings posted March 21, 2025.

== Current listings ==
	Name on the Register	Image	Date listed	Location	City or town	Description
1	Battle of Lyman's Wagon Train	Battle of Lyman's Wagon Train	August 13, 2001 (#01000875)	Address restricted	Canadian	

== See also ==
- National Register of Historic Places listings in Texas
- Recorded Texas Historic Landmarks in Hemphill County
