= Amos Chapman =

US Army civilian scout (1839–1925)

- Born: March 15, 1839; Michigan, US
- Died: July 18, 1925 (aged 86); Near Seiling, Oklahoma, US
- Resting place: Brumfield Cemetery, Dewey County, Oklahoma
- Other name: Tam-e-yukh-tah
- Occupation: Civilian scout
- Employer: U.S. Army
- Spouse: Mary Bunhio Longneck Chapman
- Awards: Medal of Honor

Amos Chapman (1839–1925) was a civilian scout who was awarded the Medal of Honor for gallantry while in service of the United States Army during the Indian Wars. His medal was later revoked before he died as he was a civilian, but was reinstated in 1989. He was of mixed white and Native American ancestry, and married Mary Longneck, a Cheyenne woman, maintaining Native American customs throughout his life. In 2012, he was inducted into the Oklahoma Military Hall of Fame.

== Biography ==
Chapman was born in 1837 in Michigan, to white and Native American parents. He began acting as a scout for the U.S. Army and settlers in the 1860s. In 1868, he moved to Oklahoma, and was attached to the Seventh Cavalry during General Alfred Sully's actions against the Cheyenne out of Fort Dodge. Subsequently, Camp Supply was set up and Chapman worked there as an interpreter.

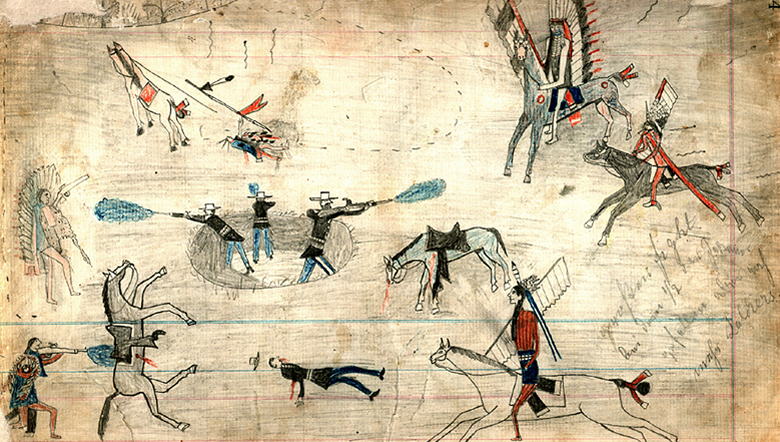
A Kiowa ledger drawing possibly depicting the Buffalo Wallow battle in 1874

He married Mary Longneck, the daughter of the Cheyenne Chief Stone Calf, and had six children with her. He lived for a time with her tribe. In July 1874, he volunteered to scout for the U.S. Army once more, and scouted for Lt. Frank Baldwin. On September 12, 1874, he was involved in an action which would earn him a Medal of Honor. Chapman, fellow civilian Billy Dixon and four soldiers were confronted with a force of over a hundred Comanches and Kiowas. At the Battle of Buffalo Wallow, as it became known, the small group made its way to a defensive position in a buffalo wallow, where it held out until the weather caused the Native American force to break off their attack. What happened during the battle is disputed. At one point either Dixon or Chapman was injured and stranded outside of the wallow and the other ventured out to retrieve his fellow scout. Chapman's story goes that he pulled Dixon up onto his back, and had to stop on his return several times to eliminate the Native Americans who were attempting to shoot him and Dixon. With a quarter of a mile to go before they reached the wallow, Chapman was shot in the shin on his right leg, which shattered the bone. He continued to drag himself and Dixon the rest of the way back to the wallow, whilst under fire. However, Dixon's story is that Chapman was already injured and Dixon retrieved him and pulled him back to the wallow. Lieutenant General Nelson A. Miles would later say of Chapman's actions that they were "one of the bravest deeds in the annals of the army." Chapman's leg was amputated by a surgeon at Camp Supply, and all the survivors were awarded a Medal of Honor.

Chapman subsequently wore a prosthetic leg, and continued to serve as camp interpreter during the commotion following the Dull Knife Fight in 1879. The Native Americans referred to him as Tam-e-yukh-tah, which translated as "the man with the cut off leg". He later retired from service and settled with his wife and family near Seiling, Oklahoma. He reportedly still slept on occasion in a teepee. Chapman would visit Miles annually in Washington. He died on July 18, 1925, as a result of injuries suffered from a wagon accident. He was due to speak as part of the lyceum circuit at the time of his death. He was buried in Brumfield Cemetery, Dewey County, Oklahoma.

== Medal of Honor and legacy ==
Chapman's medal was revoked in a review in 1916–17, along with several other awards made to civilian scouts. It was restored in 1989. His citation reads "The President of the United States of America, in the name of Congress, takes pleasure in presenting the Medal of Honor to Civilian Scout Amos Chapman, a United States Civilian, for gallantry in action on 12 September 1874, while serving as an Indian Scout with the 6th U.S. Cavalry, at Washita River, Texas." He was admitted into the Oklahoma Military Hall of Fame as one of the 2012 inductees.

== See also ==
- List of Medal of Honor recipients for the Indian Wars
