= Dickson Creek =

Stream in Solano County, United States of America

Dickson Creek is a stream in Solano County, in the U.S. state of California.
