= Dixon Creek (creek) =

Creek in Texas that flows into the Canadian River

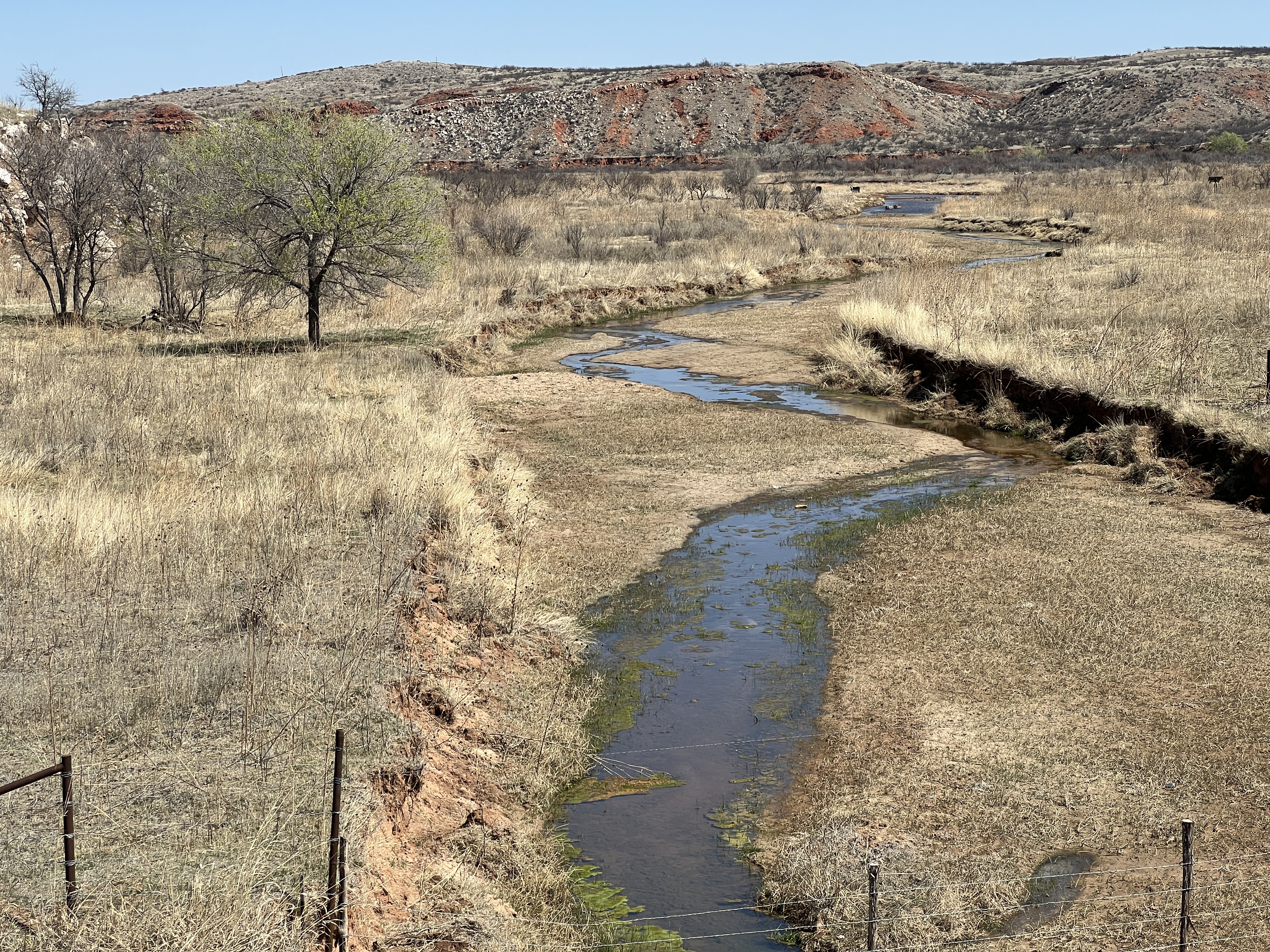
- Dixon Creek east of Borger, Texas

Location
- Country: United States
- States: Texas

Physical characteristics
- Source
  - location: Carson County, Texas
  - coordinates: 35.5697667°N 101.3484976°W
  - elevation: 3,020 ft (920 m)
- Mouth: Canadian River
  - location: Hutchinson County, Texas
  - coordinates: 35.7461523°N 101.3426630°W
  - elevation: 2,733 ft (833 m)
- Length: 12 mi (19 km)

The Dixon Creek, also known as the Limestone Creek) is a creek in Texas.

It runs from north central Carson County through Hutchinson County to the Canadian River.

It was named in honor of Billy Dixon.

== See also ==
- List of rivers of Texas
