= McClellan Creek =

Coordinates: 35°22′25″N 100°33′35″W

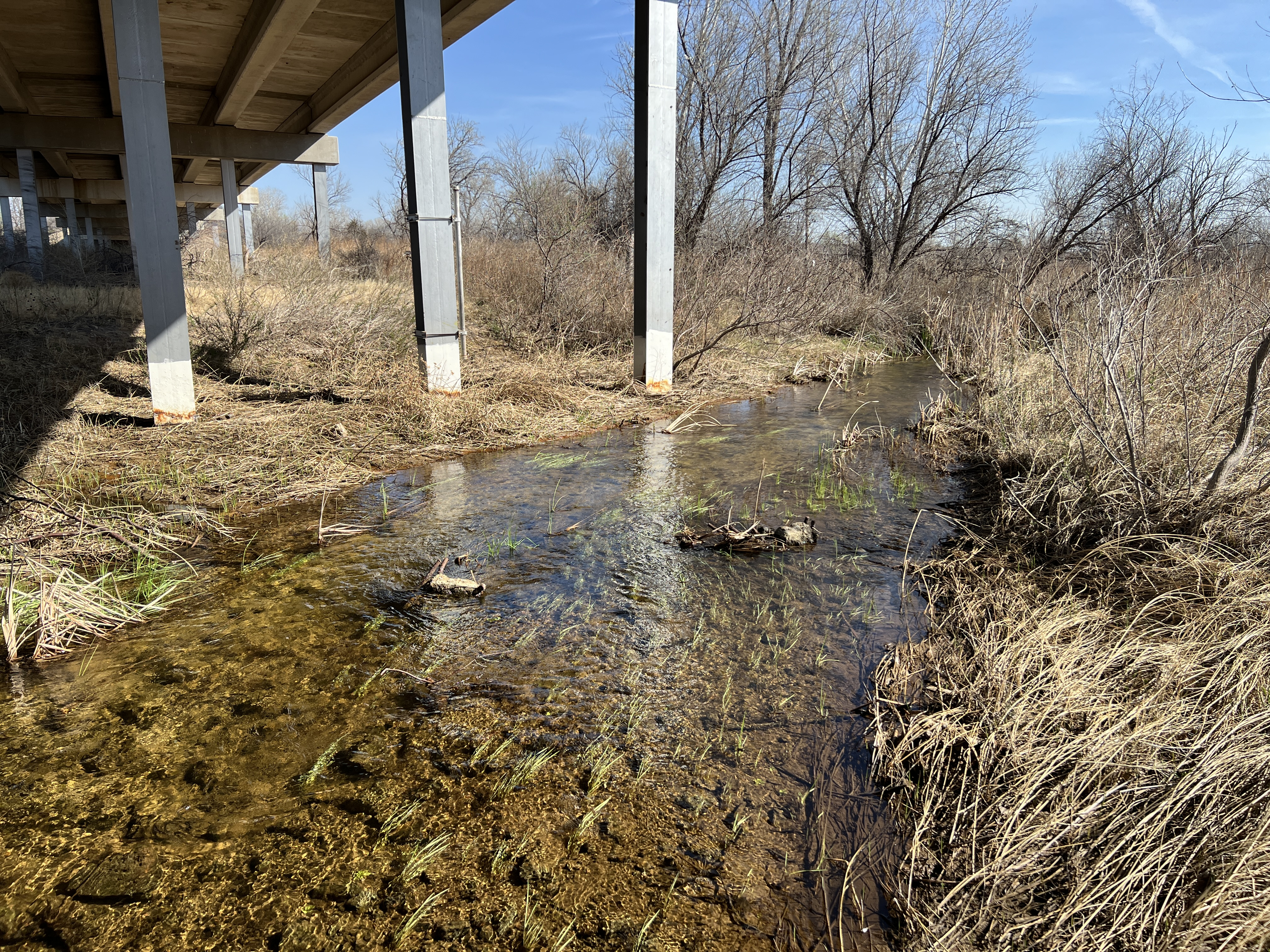
- McClellan Creek north of McLean, Texas

- Location of mouth

Location
- Country: United States

Physical characteristics
- Source
  - location: Texas
- Mouth
  - location: North Fork Red River
  - elevation: 2,474 ft (754 m)
- Length: 30 mi (48 km)

McClellan Creek is a river in Texas. Named after George B. McClellan, who with his future father-in-law, Randolph B. Marcy, made a survey of the area in 1851–52, looking for a route for the Southern Pacific Railroad.

== See also ==
- List of rivers of Texas
