= Buffalo wallow =

Naturally-occurring prairie waterhole

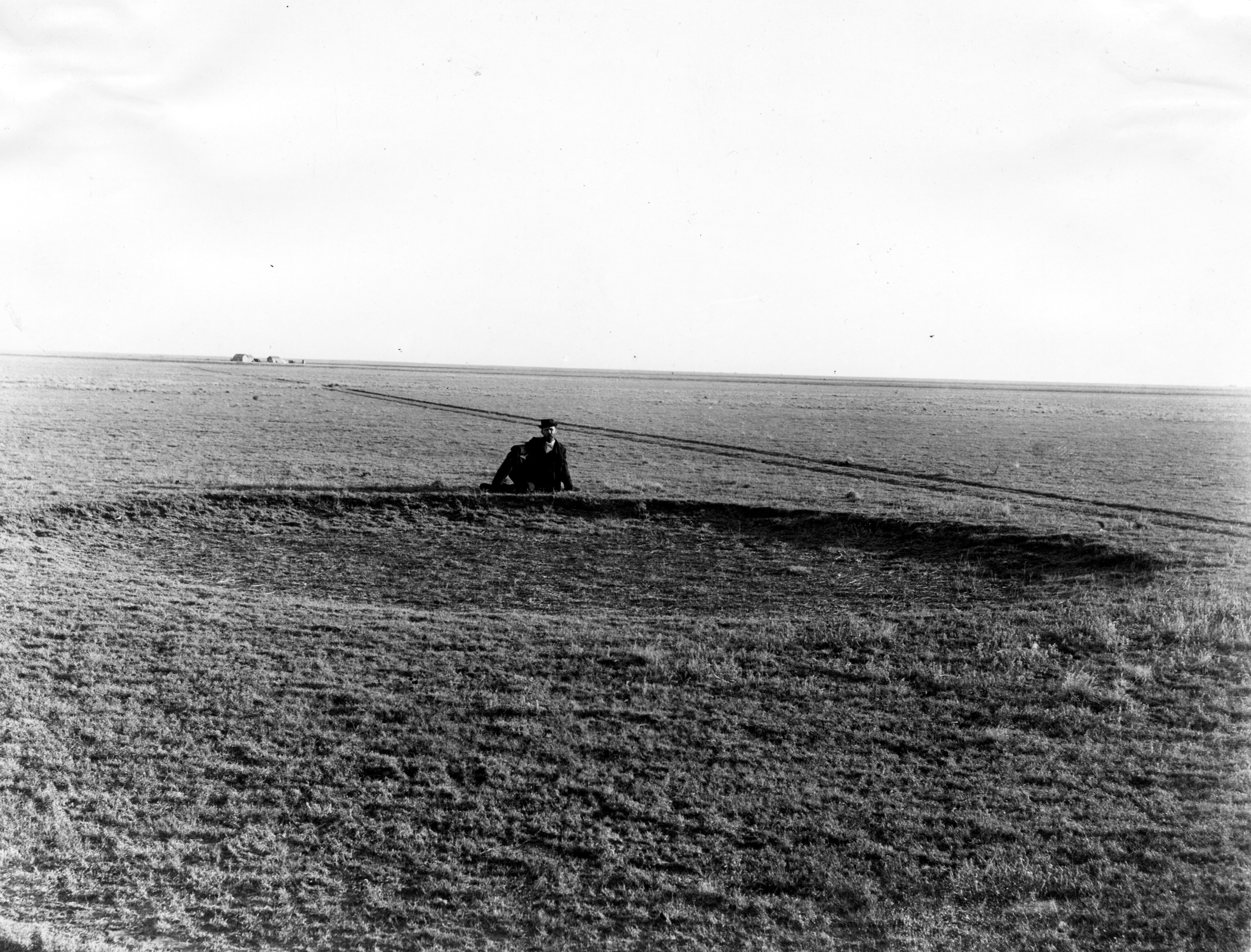
An 1897 photograph of a buffalo wallow, underlain by the Ogallala Aquifer (Haskell County, Kansas)

A buffalo wallow or bison wallow is a natural topographical depression in flat prairie land that holds rain water and runoff.

Though thriving bison herds roamed and grazed the great prairies of North America for thousands of years, they left few permanent markings on the landscape. Exceptions are the somewhat rare yet still visible ancient buffalo wallows found occasionally on the North American prairie flatlands.

Originally these naturally occurring depressions would have served as temporary watering holes for wildlife, including the American bison (buffalo). Wallowing bison that drank from and bathed in these shallow water holes gradually altered their pristine nature. Each time they went away, they carried mud with them from the hole, thus enlarging the wallow. Furthermore, the wallowing action caused abrasion of hair, natural body oils and cellular debris from their hides, leaving the debris in the water and in the soil after the water evaporated. Every year debris accumulated in the soil in increasing concentration, forming a water-impenetrable layer that prevented rain water and runoff from percolating into the lower layers of the soil. Ultimately the water remained for long periods, which attracted more wildlife. Even when stagnant, the water would be eagerly drunk by thirsty animals.

Buffalo wallows are also made by the Asian water buffalo and the African buffalo.

== In popular culture ==
In 1953, the writer Charles Tenney Jackson (1874–1955) published The Buffalo Wallow: A Prairie Boyhood, an autobiographical novel about two boys (cousins) growing up during pioneer days in an almost empty stretch of Nebraska, where their favorite hideaway is a buffalo wallow.
