= Fort Supply (Oklahoma) =

Former military post near present-day Fort Supply, Oklahoma

- Indian Territory / Woodward County, Oklahoma, USA (near Fort Supply, Oklahoma)
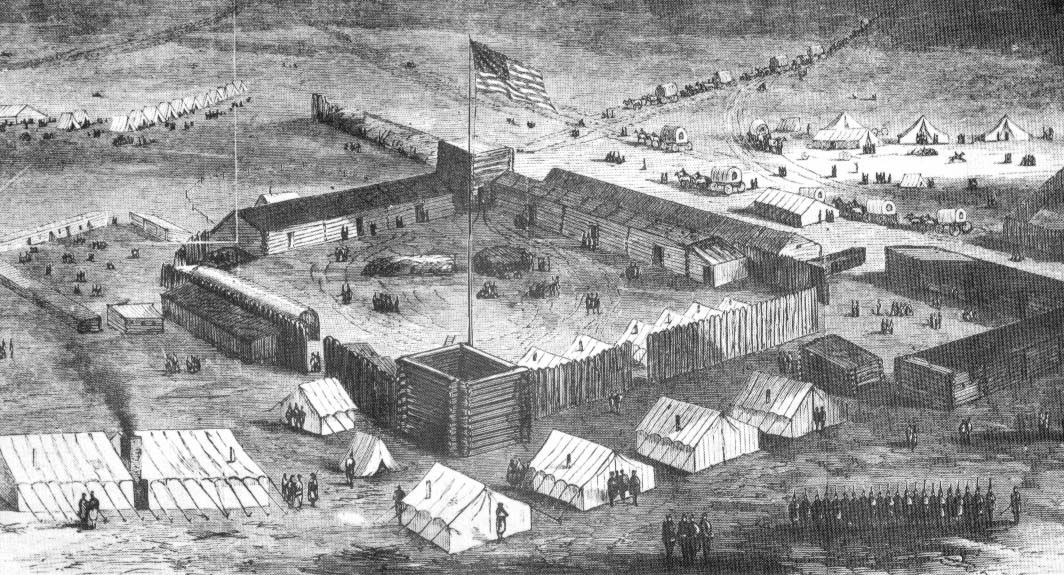
- Camp Supply Stockade, Harper's Weekly, February 1869.

Site information
- Type: Fort
- Controlled by: United States

Site history
- Built: 1868
- In use: 1868–1895
- Materials: Logs & stone
- Battles/wars: Indian Wars on the Southern Plains
- Fort Supply Historic District
- U.S. National Register of Historic Places
- U.S. Historic district
- Location within Oklahoma Location within the United States
- Location: Western State Hospital grounds, Fort Supply, Oklahoma
- Coordinates: 36°34′35″N 99°33′36″W
- Area: 5 acres (2.0 ha)
- Built: 1893
- NRHP reference No.: 71000675
- Added to NRHP: June 21, 1971

Fort Supply (originally Camp Supply) was a United States Army post established on November 18, 1868, in Indian Territory to protect the Southern Plains. It was located just east of present-day Fort Supply, Oklahoma, in what was then the Cherokee Outlet.

== History ==
Fort Supply was originally established as "Camp of Supply" on November 18, 1868 in support of General Philip Sheridan's winter campaign against the Southern Plains Indians. It was from Camp Supply that George Armstrong Custer led the Seventh United States Cavalry south to the banks of the Washita River to destroy the village of the Cheyenne Indian chief Black Kettle in what became known as the Battle of the Washita. Later, the camp served to protect the Cheyenne and Arapaho reservations, under the Darlington Agency, from incursions by whites. Camp Supply was renamed Fort Supply in 1878 following its role in the Red River War of 1874-1875.

By 1880 the Indian Wars on the Southern Plains were nearly over and the fort was in bad repair. Army officers in the Department of Missouri recommended its abandonment. Philip Sheridan, by then General of the Army, objected and worked to establish the Fort Supply Military Reservation giving permanence to the fort and an accompanying reserve of 36 square miles.

Fort Supply was officially closed September 1894 following the opening of the Cherokee Outlet to settlement. One of the last missions troops from Fort Supply performed was bringing to end the violence of the Enid-Pond Creek Railroad War during the summer of 1894. Troops from Fort Reno and U.S. Marshal E.D. Dix and his deputies had been unable to quell the wrecking of trains, destruction of tracks, and demolition of trestles by residents from both communities. On February 26, 1895, the last remaining troops turned over operation of the old fort to the Department of the Interior.

In 1908 Oklahoma's first insane asylum was established at the old post and which is now called the Western State Psychiatric Center. In 1988, the state legislature designated the remaining buildings at the old fort as the Fort Supply Historic District. Shortly afterwards the William S. Key Correctional Center was opened at the site.

The Fort Supply Historic District was placed on the National Register of Historic Places in 1971 (#71000675).

== Fort Supply Historic Site ==
The Oklahoma Historical Society operates a visitor center and is restoring five of the original structures. The visitor center features exhibits about the history of Fort Supply and northwest Oklahoma. The buildings that are being preserved and restored to their original appearance are the 1874 Ordnance Sergeant's Quarters and 1882 Civilian Employee Quarters, which are picket-style log buildings, the frame-style 1878 Commanding Officer's Quarters and duplex 1882 Officers' Quarters, and the brick 1892 Guard House. The Guard House features exhibits of artifacts and photographs.

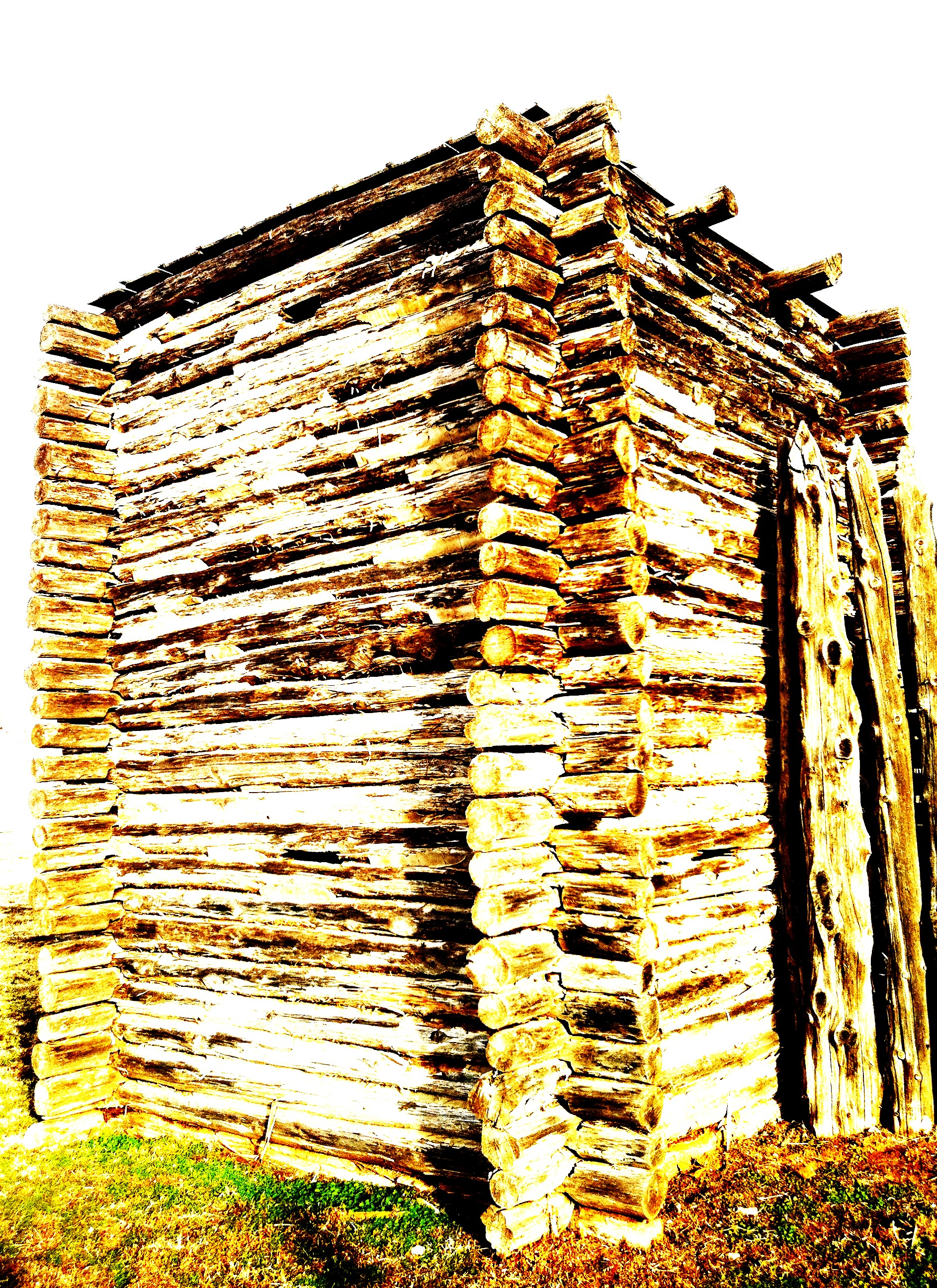
Picket-style log structures from the Fort Supply Historic Site.

The site also features replicas of the 1869 stockade, an army supply wagon, a mountain howitzer, and a Cheyenne tipi.

== Bibliography ==
- Carriker, Robert C. Fort Supply, Indian Territory: Frontier Outpost on the Plains. Norman: University of Oklahoma Press, 1990. ISBN 0-8061-2243-9
- Kappler, Charles (Editor). "Appendix II; Miscellaneous letters and documents pertaining to Executive orders establishing Indian reserves; Indian Territory—Fort Supply Military Reserve. Indian Affairs: Laws and Treaties. Washington: Government Printing Office, 1902. 1:1047 (accessed October 9, 2006).
