= Red River War =

Military campaign launched by the United States Army in 1874

- Part of the American Indian Wars
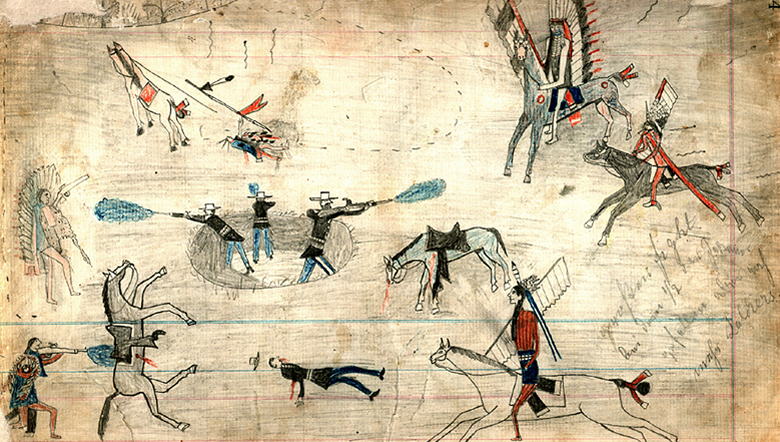
- A Kiowa ledger drawing possibly depicting the Battle of Buffalo Wallow in 1874, one of several clashes between Southern Plains Indians and the U.S. Army during the Red River War.
| Date | 1874–75 |
| Location | Southern Plains |
| Result | United States victory; end of the Texas–Indian wars |

Belligerents
| United States | Comanche, Kiowa, Southern Cheyenne, Arapaho |

The Red River War was a military campaign launched by the United States Army in 1874 to displace the Comanche, Kiowa, Southern Cheyenne, and Arapaho tribes from the Southern Plains, and forcibly relocate the tribes to reservations in Indian Territory. The war had several army columns crisscross the Texas Panhandle in an effort to locate, harass, and capture nomadic Native American bands. Most of the engagements were small skirmishes with few casualties on either side. The war wound down over the last few months of 1874, as fewer and fewer Indian bands had the strength and supplies to remain in the field. Though the last significantly sized group did not surrender until mid-1875, the war marked the end of free-roaming Indian populations on the southern Great Plains.

== Background ==
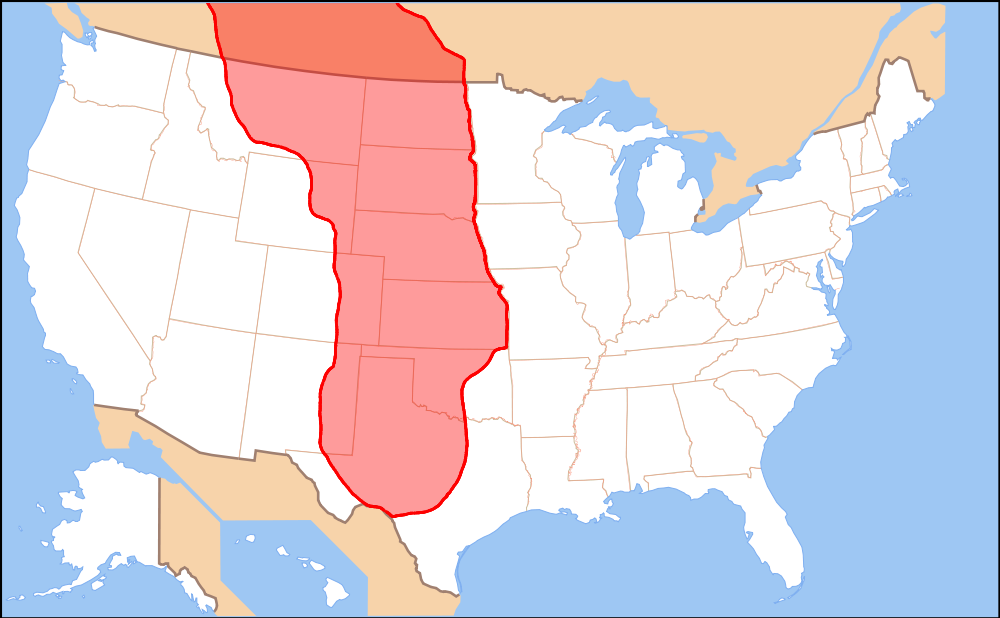
Region of the Great Plains in North America

Prior to the arrival of English American settlers on the Great Plains, the southern Plains tribes had evolved into a nomadic pattern of existence. Beginning in the 1830s, significant numbers of permanent settlements were established in what had previously been the territory of the various Indigenous peoples of the Americas. Attacks, raids, and counter-raids occurred frequently. Prior to the Civil War, the U.S. Army was only sporadically involved in these frontier conflicts, manning forts, but limited to a handful of larger expeditions due to manpower limitations. During the Civil War, the Regular Army withdrew almost completely, and Indian raids increased dramatically. Texas, as part of the Confederate States of America, lacked the military resources to fight both the Union and the tribes.

After the war, the military began reasserting itself along the frontier. The Medicine Lodge Treaty, signed near present-day Medicine Lodge, Kansas, in 1867, called for two reservations to be set aside in Indian Territory, one for the Comanche and Kiowa and one for the Southern Cheyenne and Arapaho. According to the treaty, the government would provide the tribes with housing, agricultural training, and food and other supplies. In exchange, the Indians agreed to cease raiding and attacking settlements. Dozens of chiefs endorsed the treaty and some tribal members moved voluntarily to the reservations, but it was never officially ratified and several groups of Indians still on the Plains did not attend the negotiations.

In 1867, the U.S. Army began hunting buffalo to sabotage the food sources of the indigenous people inhabiting the plains. In 1870, a new technique for tanning buffalo hides became commercially available. In response, commercial hunters began systematically targeting buffalo for the first time. Once numbering in the tens of millions, the buffalo population plummeted. By 1878, they were all but extinct.

The destruction of the buffalo herds was a disaster for the Plains Indians, on and off the reservations. The entire nomadic way of life had been based around the animals. They were used for food, fuel, and construction materials. Without abundant buffalo, the southern Plains Indians had no means of self-support.

By the winter of 1873–1874, the southern Plains Indians were in crisis. The reduction of the buffalo herds combined with increasing numbers of new settlers and more aggressive military patrols had put them in an unsustainable position.

== War ==
During the winter, a spiritual leader named Isatai'i emerged among the Quahadi Band of Comanches. Isatai'i claimed to have the power to render himself and others invulnerable to their enemies, including to bullets, and was able to rally an enormous number of Indians for large raids. Also, a shift occurred within the political structure of the Kiowa, bringing the war faction (influenced by the head chief Guipago, or Gui-pah-gho, sometimes known by modern people as Lone Wolf "the Elder" to prevent confusion with Mamay-dayte, later named Lone Wolf "the Younger") into a greater position of influence than they had held previously.

=== Early engagements ===
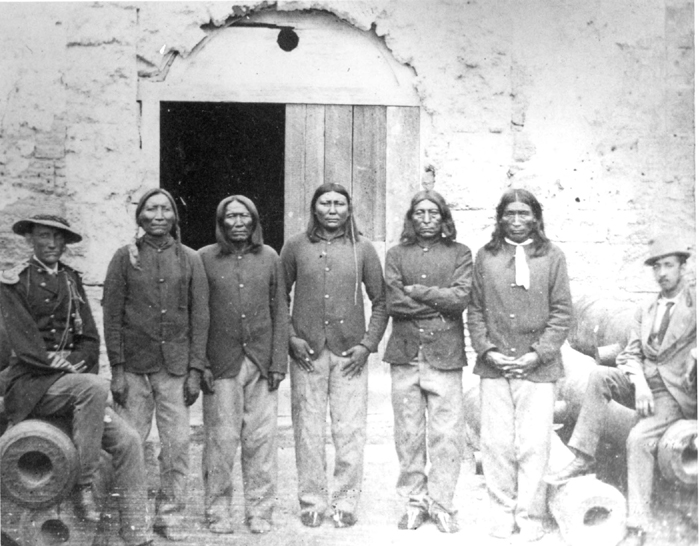
Native American prisoners of the Red River War, Fort Marion, Florida 1875: The inscription on the back of the original stereograph says: L to R:Lone Wolf, Double Vision, White Horse, Woman's Heart, Mamante - Kiowas. Officer left is Capt. Richard H. Pratt

On 27 June 1874, Isatai'i and Comanche chief Quanah Parker led about 250 warriors in an attack on a small outpost of buffalo hunters in the Texas Panhandle called Adobe Walls. The encampment consisted of just a few buildings and was occupied by only 28 men and one woman. Though a few whites were killed in the opening moments of the Second Battle of Adobe Walls, the majority were able to barricade themselves indoors and hold off the attack. Using large-caliber buffalo guns, the hunters could fire on the warriors from much greater range than the Indians had expected, and the attack failed.

A second engagement involving the Kiowa took place in Texas. Warriors led by Lone Wolf attacked a patrol of Texas Rangers in July. The Lost Valley fight had light casualties on both sides, but it served to raise tensions along the frontier and push the Army into an aggressive response.

The explosion of violence took the government by surprise. The "peace policy" of the Grant administration was deemed a failure, and the Army was authorized to subdue the southern Plains tribes with whatever force necessary. At this time, roughly 1,800 Cheyennes, 2,000 Comanches, and 1,000 Kiowas remained at large. Combined, they mounted about 1,200 warriors.

=== Army response ===
General Philip Sheridan ordered five army columns to converge on the general area of the Texas Panhandle and specifically upon the upper tributaries of the Red River. The strategy was to deny the Indians any safe haven and attack them unceasingly until they went permanently to the reservations.

Three of the five columns were under the command of Colonel Ranald S. Mackenzie. The Tenth Cavalry, under Lieutenant Colonel John W. Davidson, came due west from Fort Sill. The Eleventh Infantry, under Lieutenant Colonel George P. Buell, moved northwest from Fort Griffin. Mackenzie himself led the Fourth Cavalry north from Fort Concho.

The fourth column, consisting of the Sixth Cavalry and Fifth Infantry, was commanded by Colonel Nelson A. Miles and came south from Fort Dodge. The fifth column, the Eighth Cavalry commanded by Major William R. Price, a total of 225 officers and men, plus six Indian scouts and two guides originated from Fort Union, marched east via Fort Bascom in New Mexico. The plan called for the converging columns to maintain a continuous offensive until a decisive defeat had been inflicted on the Indians.

As many as 20 engagements took place across the Texas Panhandle. The Army, consisting entirely of soldiers and scouts, sought to engage the Indians at any opportunity. The Indians, traveling with women, children, and the elderly, mostly attempted to avoid them. When the two did encounter one another, the Indians usually tried to escape before the Army could force them to surrender. However, even a successful escape could be disastrously costly if horses, food, and equipment had to be left behind. By contrast, the Army and its Indian scouts had access to essentially limitless supplies and equipment. They frequently burned anything they captured from retreating Indians, and were capable of continuing operations indefinitely. The war continued throughout the fall of 1874, but increasing numbers of Indians were forced to give up and head for Fort Sill to enter the reservation system.

=== Battle of the Upper Washita River ===
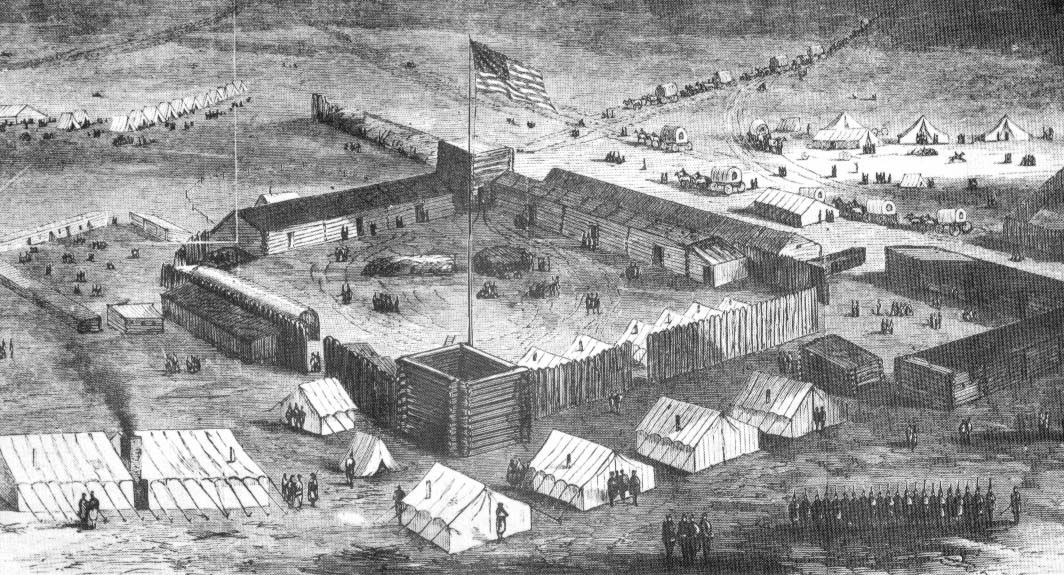
Camp Supply Stockade, Harper's Weekly, February 1869.

On September 9, 1874, Captain Wyllys Lyman led a wagon train full of rations to Camp Supply in the Indian Territory for Col. Nelson A. Miles' troops when they were confronted by a group of Comanches and Kiowas. In the ensuing battle, Lyman and 95 troops formed a wagon corral and held off their adversaries, numbered at about 400, and a scout was dispatched to send word to Camp Supply.
Soon after, the Sixth Cavalry was sent without rest and during a rainstorm to aid the wagon train. Upon their arrival on September 14, the attackers fled.
The battle was the longest and one of the most publicized of the War. It is known as both the Battle of the Upper Washita River and the Battle of Lyman's Wagon Train.

=== Battle of Palo Duro Canyon ===
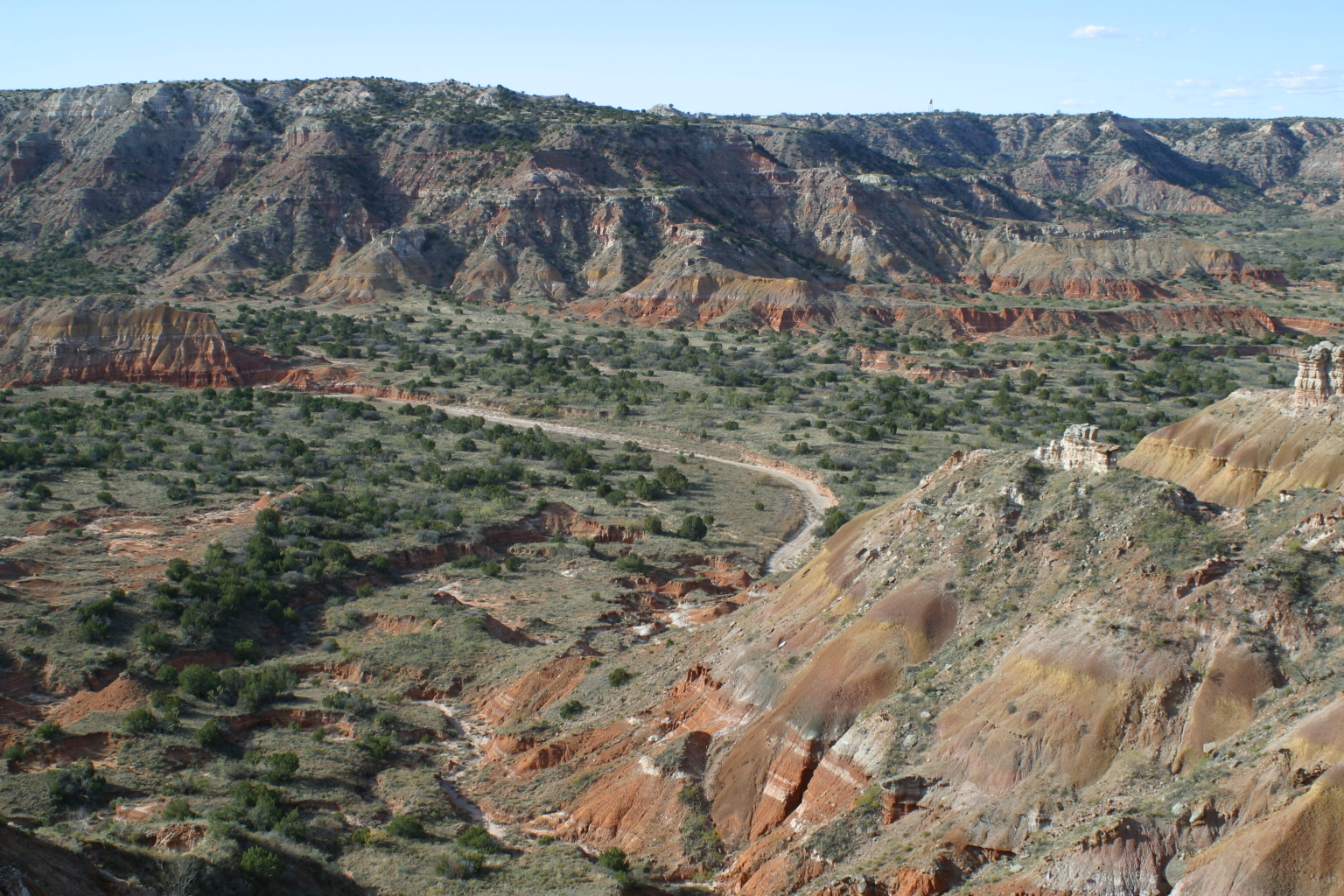
Rugged terrain of the Palo Duro Canyon

Early in September, Tonkawa and Black Seminole Scouts in advance of the Fourth Cavalry were ambushed by Comanche near the Staked Plains and escaped with their lives. The scouts relayed the Comanche position and alerted Col. Mackenzie of their whereabouts.

The largest Army victory came when Mackenzie's scouts found a large village of Comanche, Kiowa, and Cheyenne, including their horses and winter food supply, in upper Palo Duro Canyon. At dawn on September 28, Mackenzie's troops attacked down a steep canyon wall. The Native Americans were unprepared and did not have time to gather their horses or supplies before retreating. Sergeant John Charlton wrote of the battle:

The warriors held their ground for a time, fighting desperately to cover the exit of their squaws and pack animals, but under the persistent fire of the troops, they soon began falling back.

Only four Indians were killed, but the effect was devastating. Mackenzie's men burned over 450 lodges and destroyed countless pounds of buffalo meat. They also took 1,400 horses, most of which were subsequently shot to prevent the Indians from recapturing them.

Except for its unusually large size, the Battle of Palo Duro Canyon was typical of the war. Most encounters produced little to no casualties, but the Indians could not afford the constant loss of food and mounts. Even if it escaped immediate danger, an Indian band that found itself on foot and with limited options for food generally had no choice but to give up and head for the reservation.

== Aftermath ==
The Red River War officially ended in June 1875 when Quanah Parker and his band of Quahadi Comanche entered Fort Sill and surrendered; they were the last large roaming band of southwestern Indians. Combined with the extermination of the buffalo, the war left the Texas Panhandle permanently open to settlement by farmers and ranchers. It was the final military defeat of the once powerful Southern Plains tribes and brought an end to the Texas–Indian Wars.

At the conclusion of the war, Philip Sheridan and William Tecumseh Sherman sought to have many of the captives executed through military tribunals. However, the officer in charge of the prosecutions found that no "state of war" ever formally existed, and therefore such military tribunals had no legal authority. Instead, Sherman (with Ulysses S. Grant's backing) was able to secure the exile of 71 captives to a prison in Florida, where they were to be imprisoned until their deaths.

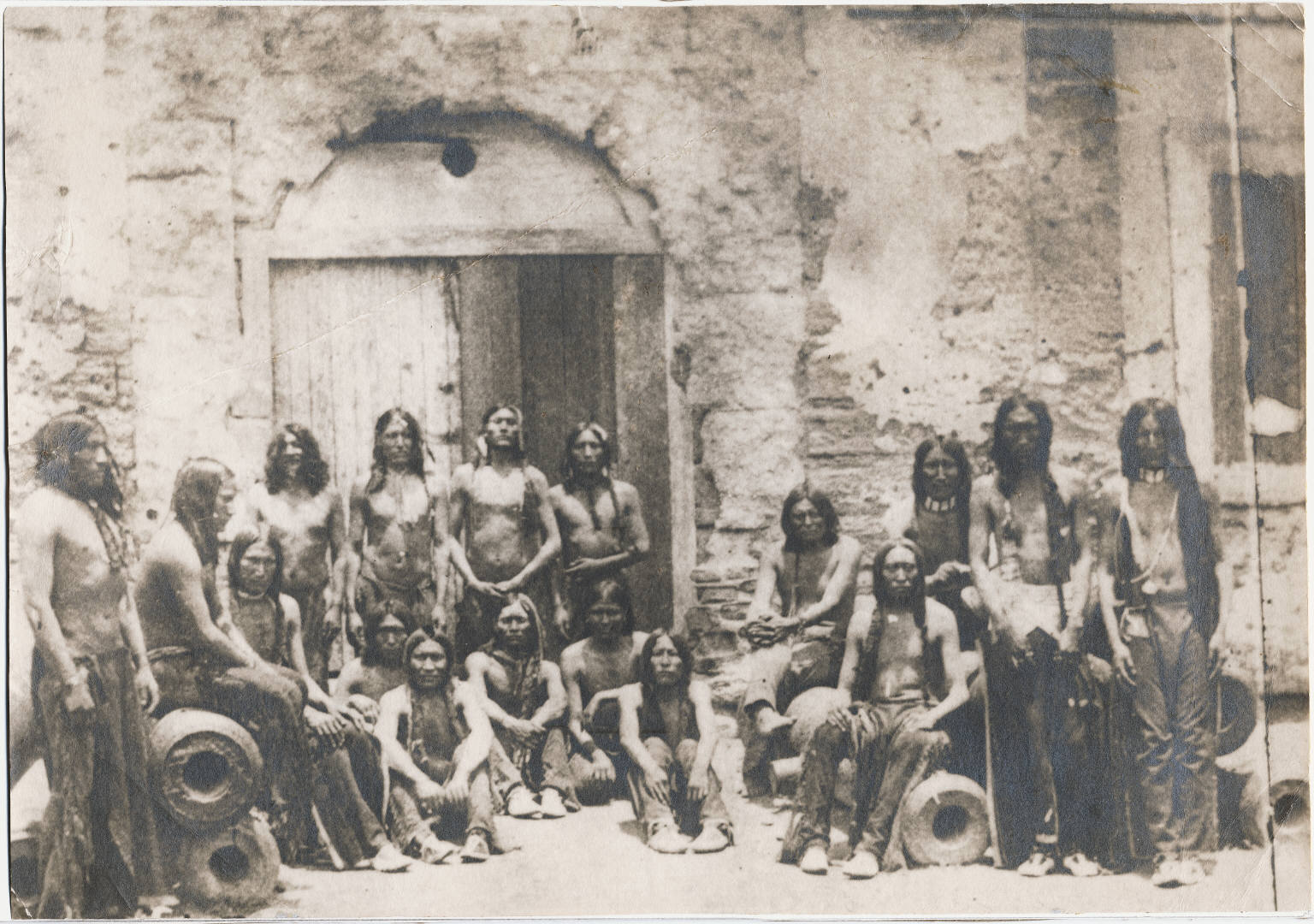
Native American prisoners at the old Fort St. Augustine, Florida, 1875.
