= Texas panhandle =

Region in Texas, United States

- Region
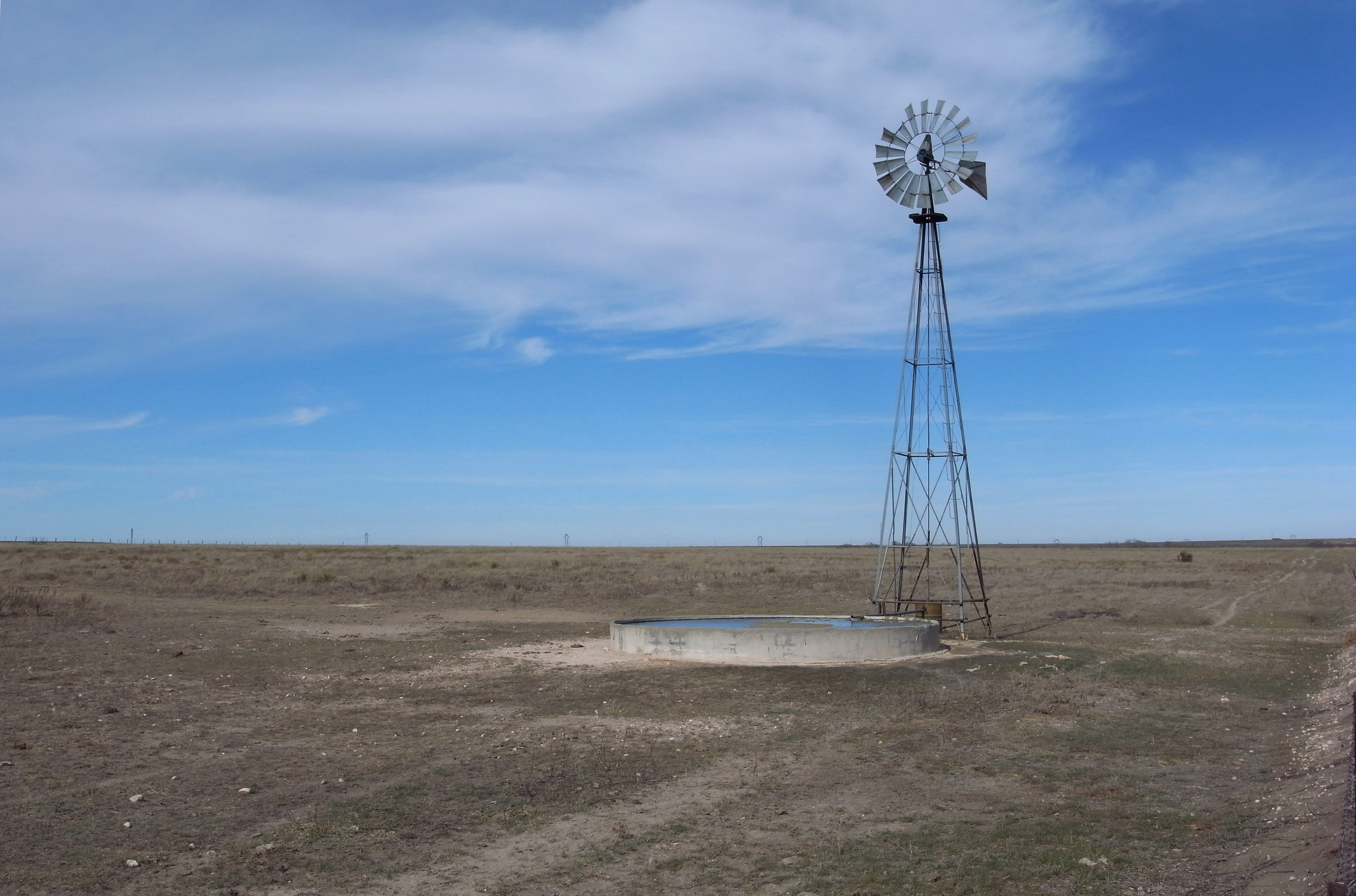
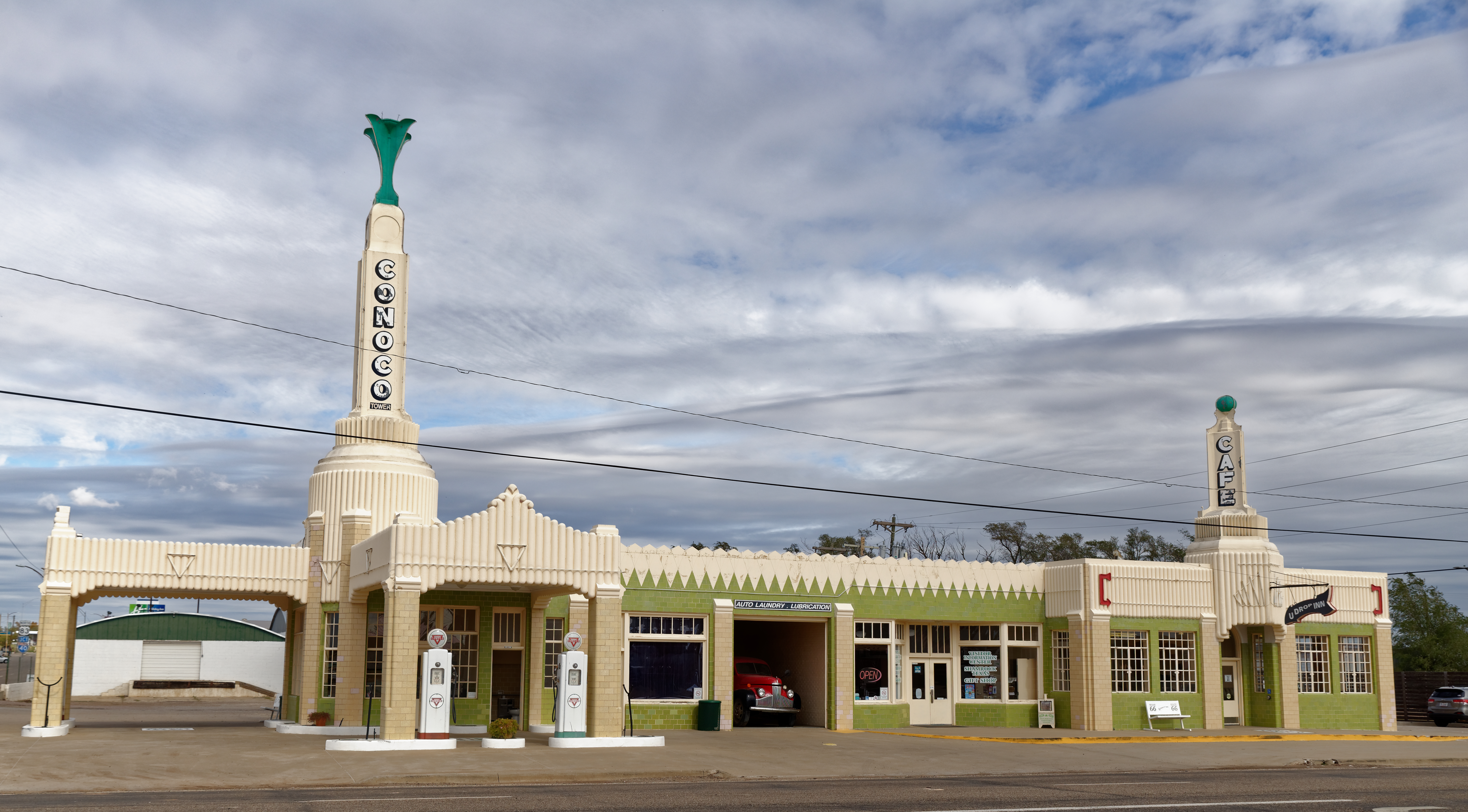
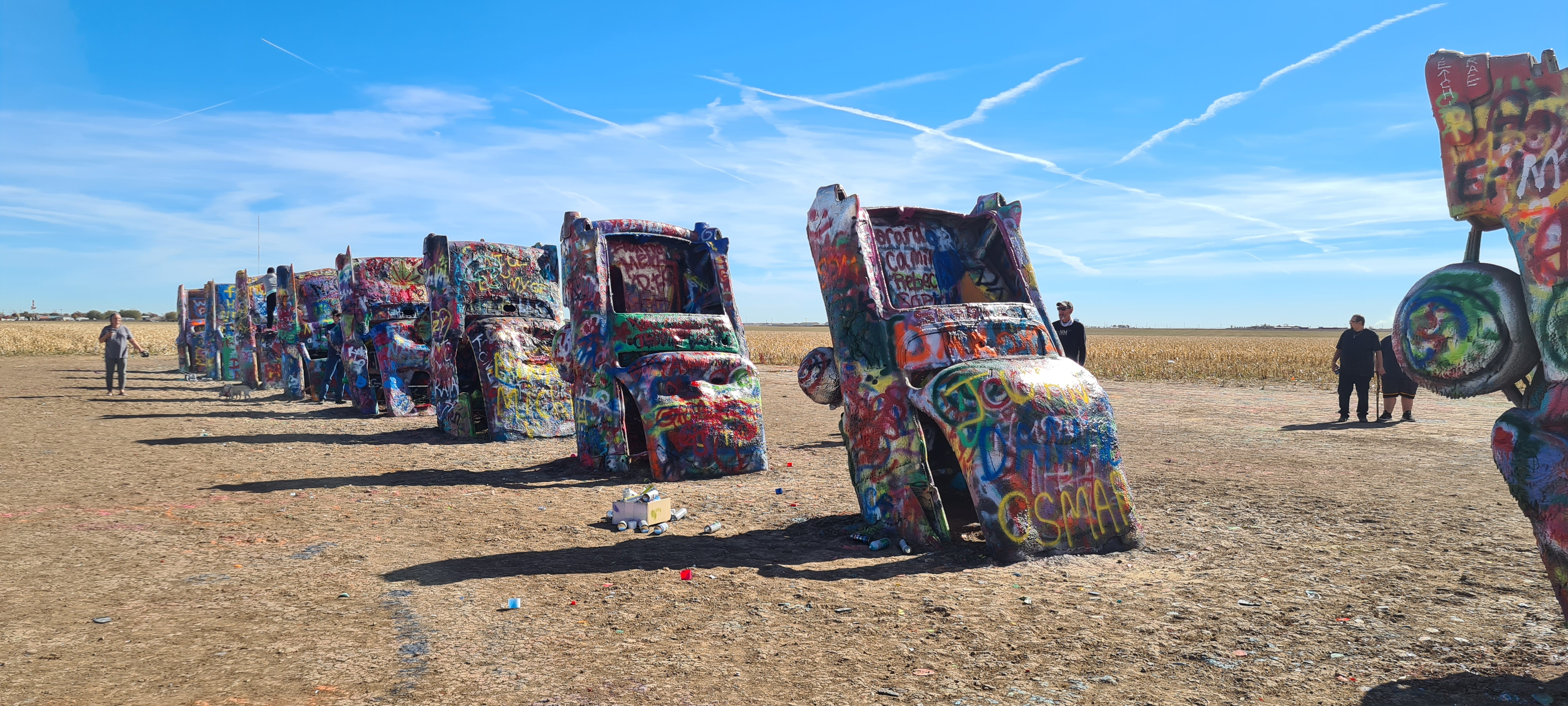
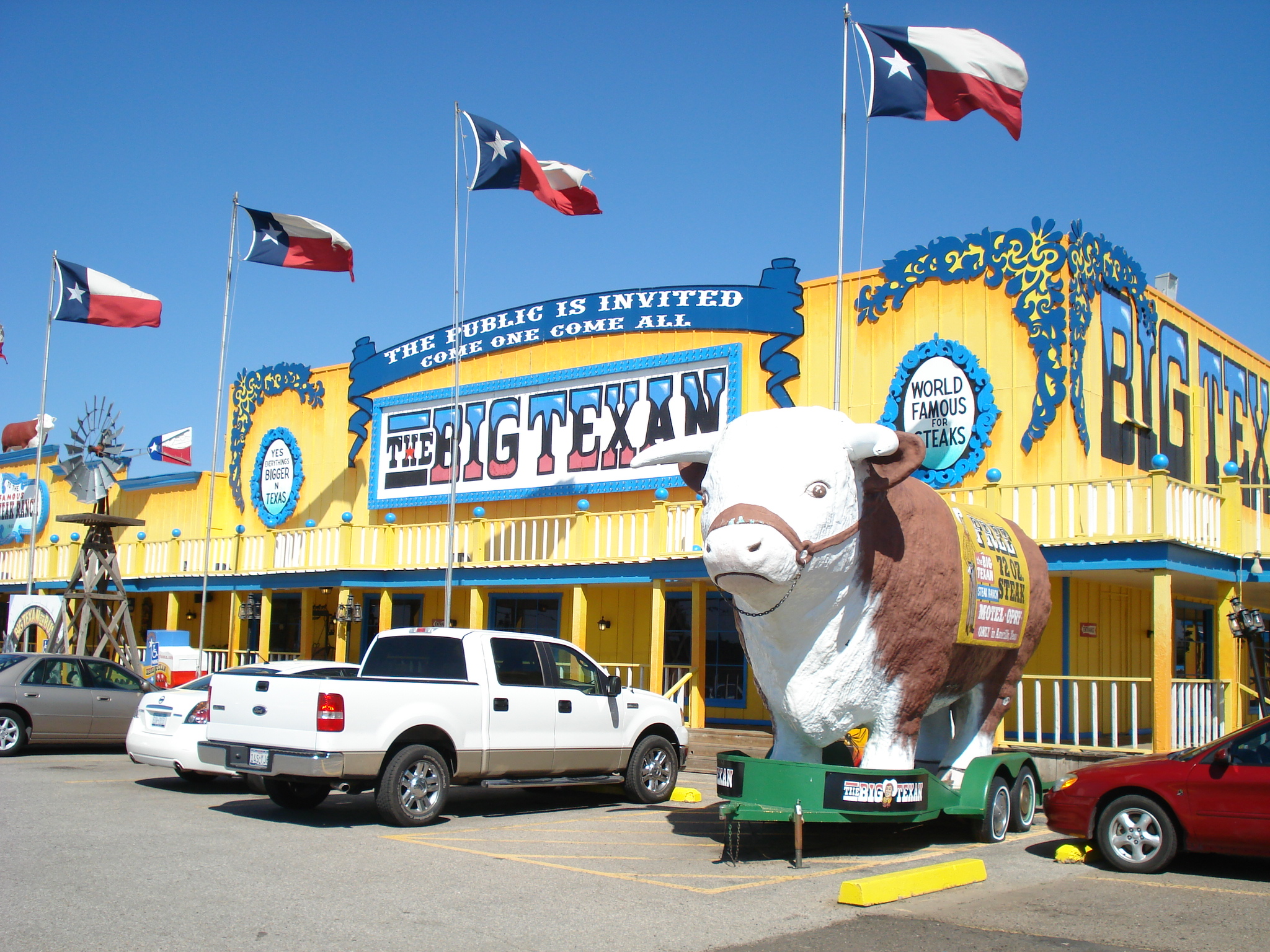
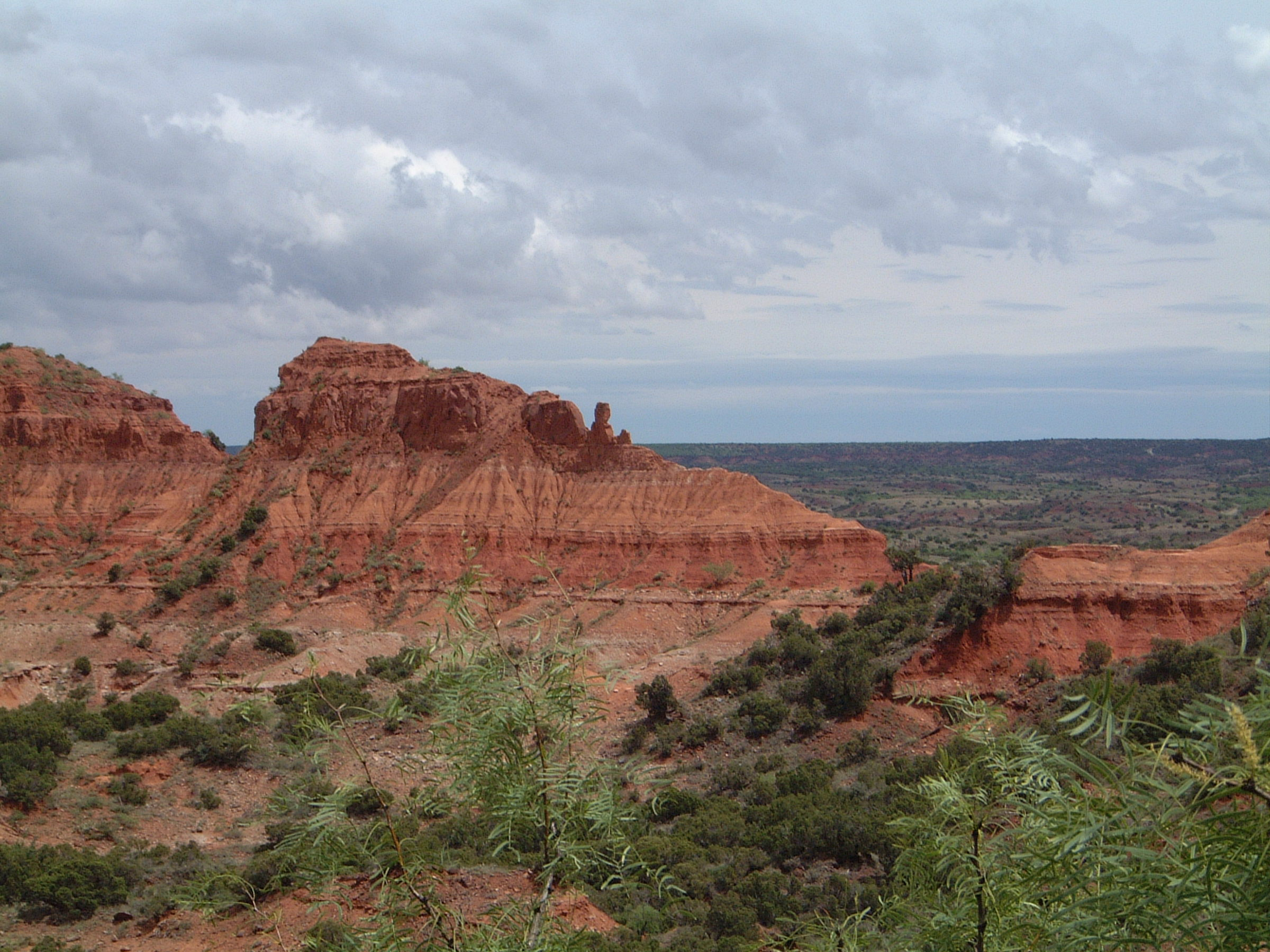
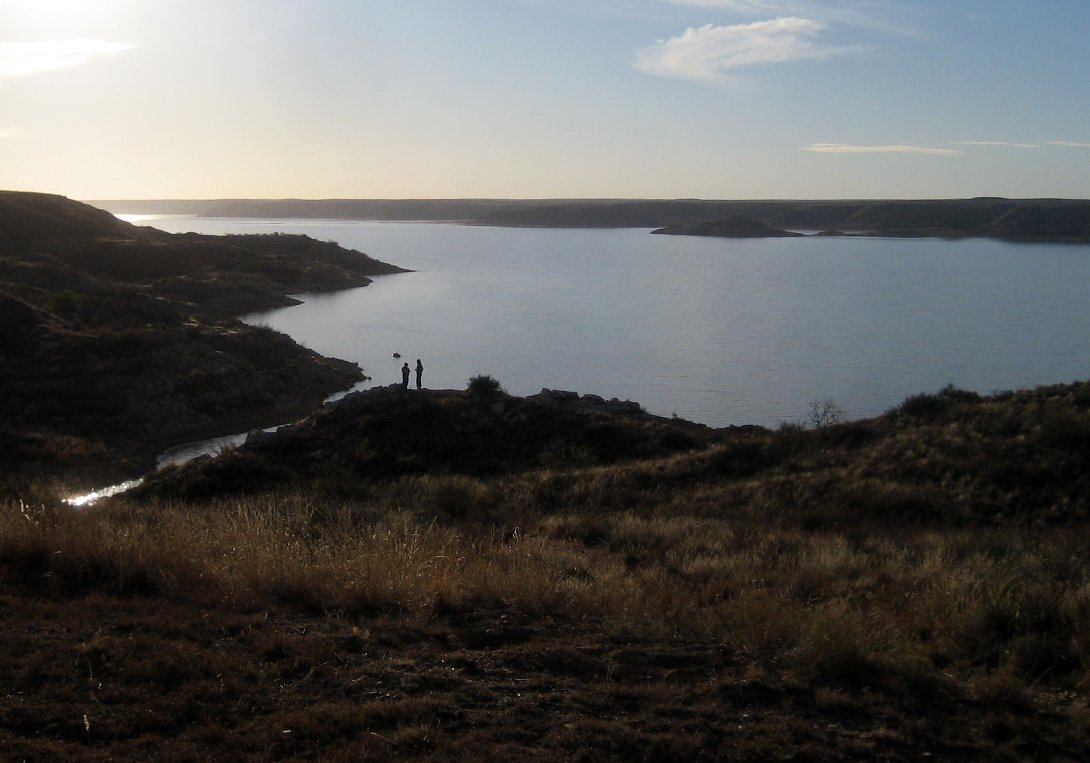
- A windpump, Randall County U-Drop Inn Midpoint Café Cadillac Ranch Big Texan Steak Ranch Caprock Canyons, Briscoe County Lake Meredith

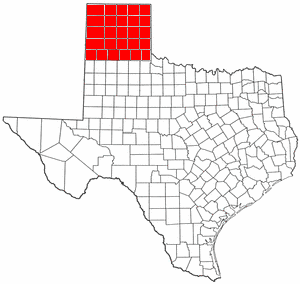
- Map of the Texas panhandle
- Coordinates: 35°27′N 101°30′W
- Country: United States
- State: Texas
- Region: High Plains

Area
  - Total: 25,887 sq mi (67,046 km^{2})

Population (2020)
  - Total: 434,358
  - Density: 16.779/sq mi (6.4785/km^{2})
- Time zone: UTC−6 (Central)
- Area codes: 806, 940 (Childress County)
- Website: Handbook of Texas: "Panhandle"

The Texas panhandle is a region of the U.S. state of Texas consisting of the northernmost 26 counties in the state. The panhandle is a square-shaped area bordered by New Mexico to the west and Oklahoma to the north and east. It is adjacent to the Oklahoma panhandle, land which Texas previously claimed. With an economy primarily based in agriculture, meat-packing, and oil, the Texas panhandle was deeply affected by the Dust Bowl of the 1930s, and has since diversified its economy into other areas in the 21st century, such as wind energy.

Interstate 40 of the Interstate Highway System runs east–west through the panhandle, and is the primary mode of transportation to Amarillo, the county seat of Potter County and most populous city in the region. Remnants of U.S. Route 66 along I-40 make roadside attractions an economic factor in the region, such as Cadillac Ranch, the U-Drop Inn, the Big Texan Steak Ranch, Midpoint Café, The Cross of Our Lord Jesus Christ, and the Leaning Tower of Texas.

== Geography ==
The 1820 Missouri Compromise declared no slavery would be allowed in states admitted from the Louisiana Purchase above 36°30′ north latitude. Texas was annexed in 1845 from still more westerly land. The Compromise of 1850 removed territory north of this line from Texas, and set the border between the Texas panhandle and the New Mexico Territory at the 103rd meridian west. The eastern border at the 100th meridian west was inherited from the Adams–Onís Treaty of 1819, which defined the border between the United States and New Spain. The western edge of the panhandle, defined as the 103rd meridian west, served as the western boundary of the Oklahoma panhandle. The 103rd meridian became known as the Cimarron Meridian, and along with the Cimarron Territory was named for the Cimarron River. Surveyors first marked Texas's portion of the meridian in 1859. The boundary marked by this survey was inaccurately placed between 2 and 4 miles too far west. The northwest corner of Texas is at roughly 103.04° west, 12,234 feet to west of the Cimmaron Meridian. The southernmost point on Texas's border intended to be on the Cimmaron Meridian is at 103.06° west, 19,962 feet too far west. These surveying errors give Texas close to 1,000 square miles of land that was intended to be part of New Mexico under the Compromise of 1850. Although Oklahoma shared the Cimmaron Meridian as its western border, its surveyors were more accurate, meaning that Texas's panhandle extends farther west than Oklahoma's.

The Handbook of Texas defines the southern border of Swisher County as the southern boundary of the Texas panhandle region. The land area of the Texas panhandle is 25,823.89 sq mi (66,883.58 km^{2}), or nearly 10% of the state's total. An additional 62.75 sq mi (162.53 km^{2}) is covered by water. Its population as of the 2010 census was 427,927 residents, or 1.7% of the state's total population. As of the 2010 census, the population density for the region was 16.6 per square mile (6.4/km^{2}). However, more than 72% of residents live in the Amarillo metropolitan area, which is the largest and fastest-growing urban area in the region. Despite being geographically the northernmost part of Texas, the panhandle is distinct from the region commonly called "North Texas", which is to the south and east.

== Features ==
West of the Caprock Escarpment and north and south of the Canadian River breaks, the surface of the Llano Estacado is rather flat. South of Amarillo, the level terrain gives way to Palo Duro Canyon, the second-largest canyon in the United States. This colorful canyon was carved by the Prairie Dog Town Fork Red River, a tributary of the Red River. North of Amarillo lies Lake Meredith, a reservoir created by Sanford Dam constructed on the main stem of the Canadian River. Lake Meredith and the Ogallala Aquifer are the primary sources of fresh water in this semi-arid region of the High Plains. I-40 passes through the panhandle and Amarillo, along with the counties of Deaf Smith, Oldham, Potter, Carson, Gray, Donley, and Wheeler.

== Demographics ==
As of the census of 2020, about 434,358 people lived in the panhandle. Of these, 53.6% were non-Hispanic White, 35.2% were Hispanic, 4.8% were African American, 2.8% were Asian. Only 4.1% were of some other ethnicity. About 92.3% of inhabitants claimed native birth, and 8.9% were veterans of the United States armed forces; 49.9% of the population was male, and 50.1% was female. Around 13.2% of the population was 65 years of age or older, whereas 27.8% of the population was under 18 years of age.

== Politics ==
Texas panhandle in the 2024 presidential election

Texas panhandle presidential election results
Year	Democratic	Republican	Third parties
2024	18.3% 29,045	80.8% 128,237	0.9% 1,441
2020	19.5% 31,110	79.9% 126,349	1.5% 2,453
2016	17.0% 24,039	79.0% 111,825	4.0% 5,606
2012	17.4% 22,774	82.6% 108,050	0% 0
2008	20.3% 29,564	78.3% 114,202	1.4% 2,094
2004	18.9% 26,628	81.1% 114,570	0% 0
2000	21.2% 27,180	78.8% 101,241	0% 0
1996	28.6% 36,886	65.0% 83,879	8.6% 8,356

== Counties ==
The 26 counties (west to east, from the northwest corner) are:

1. Dallam
2. Sherman
3. Hansford
4. Ochiltree
5. Lipscomb
6. Hartley
7. Moore
8. Hutchinson
9. Roberts
10. Hemphill
11. Oldham
12. Potter
13. Carson
14. Gray
15. Wheeler
16. Deaf Smith
17. Randall
18. Armstrong
19. Donley
20. Collingsworth
21. Parmer
22. Castro
23. Swisher
24. Briscoe
25. Hall
26. Childress

== Cities and towns ==
Major cities with populations greater than 10,000 include:

- Amarillo
- Borger
- Canyon
- Dumas
- Hereford
- Pampa

Towns with populations less than 10,000 include:

- Booker
- Bovina
- Cactus
- Canadian
- Channing
- Childress
- Clarendon
- Claude
- Dalhart
- Darrouzett
- Dimmitt
- Dodson
- Farwell
- Follett
- Friona
- Fritch
- Groom
- Gruver
- Happy
- Hartley
- Higgins
- Kress
- Lefors
- Masterson
- McLean
- Memphis
- Mobeetie
- Panhandle
- Perryton
- Sanford
- Shamrock
- Silverton
- Spearman
- Stinnett
- Stratford
- Sunray
- Texline
- Tulia
- Turkey
- Vega
- Wellington
- Wheeler
- White Deer

== Gallery ==
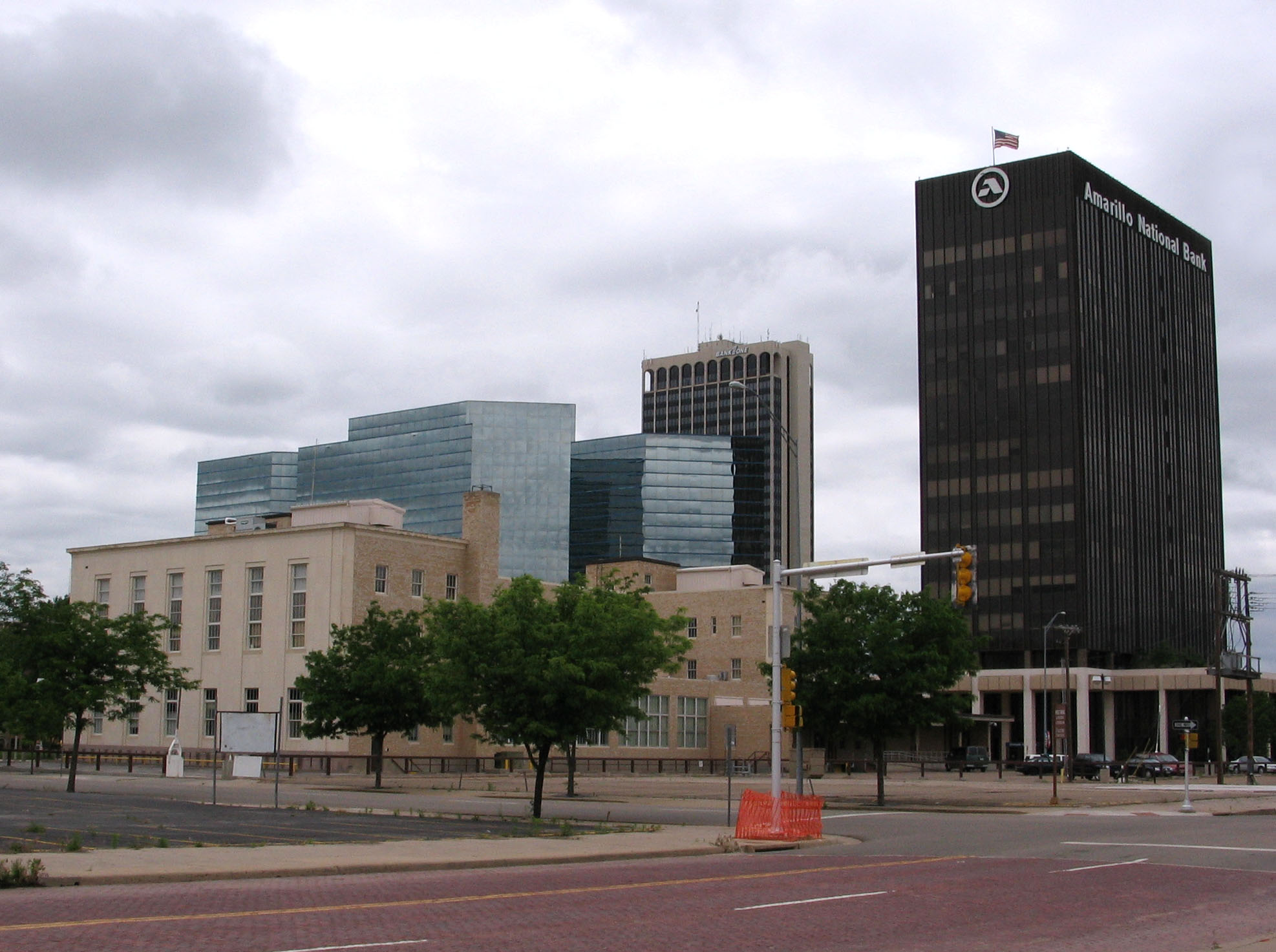
Amarillo is the largest city in the Texas panhandle.

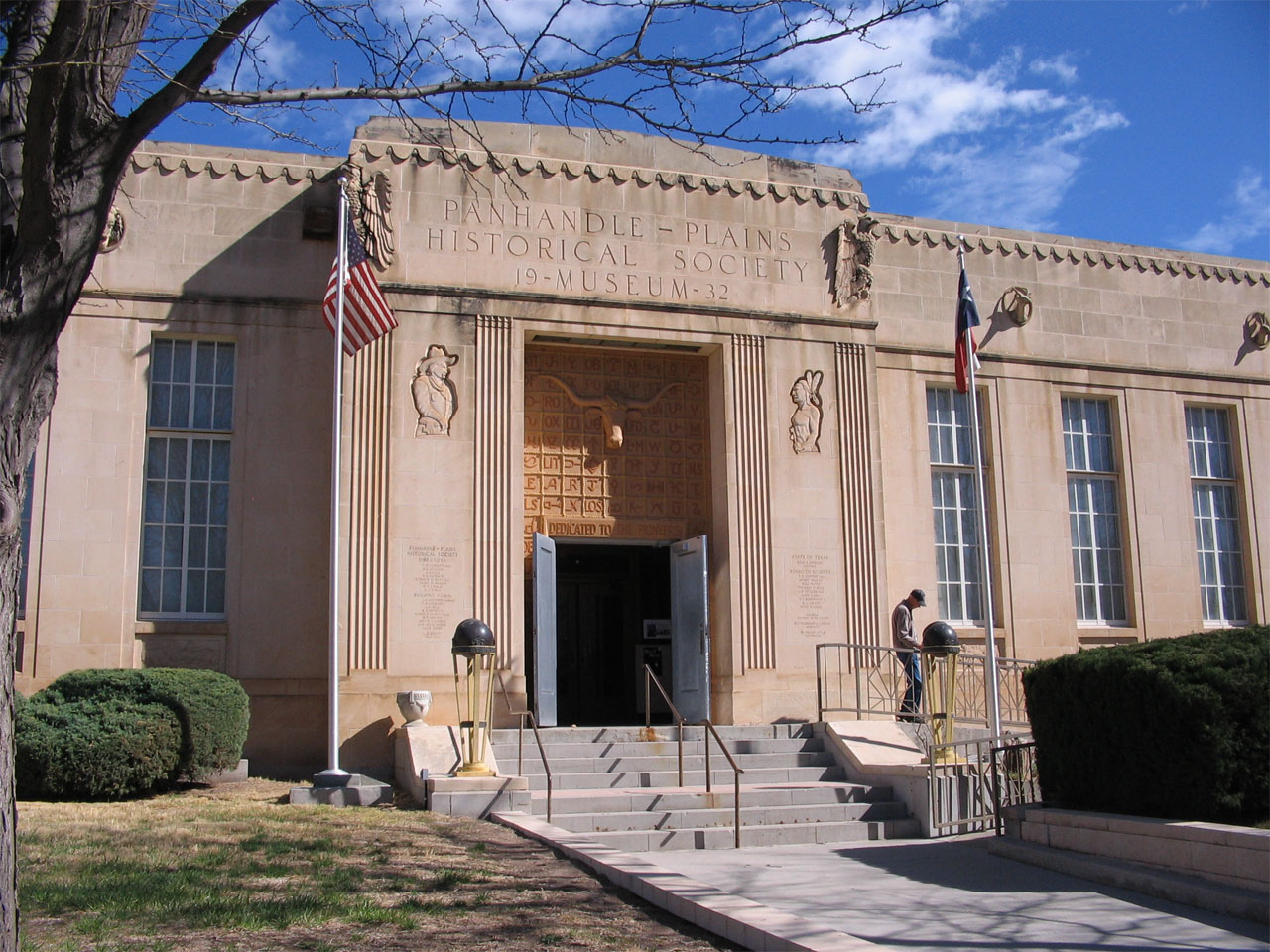
Panhandle-Plains Historical Museum in Canyon, Texas

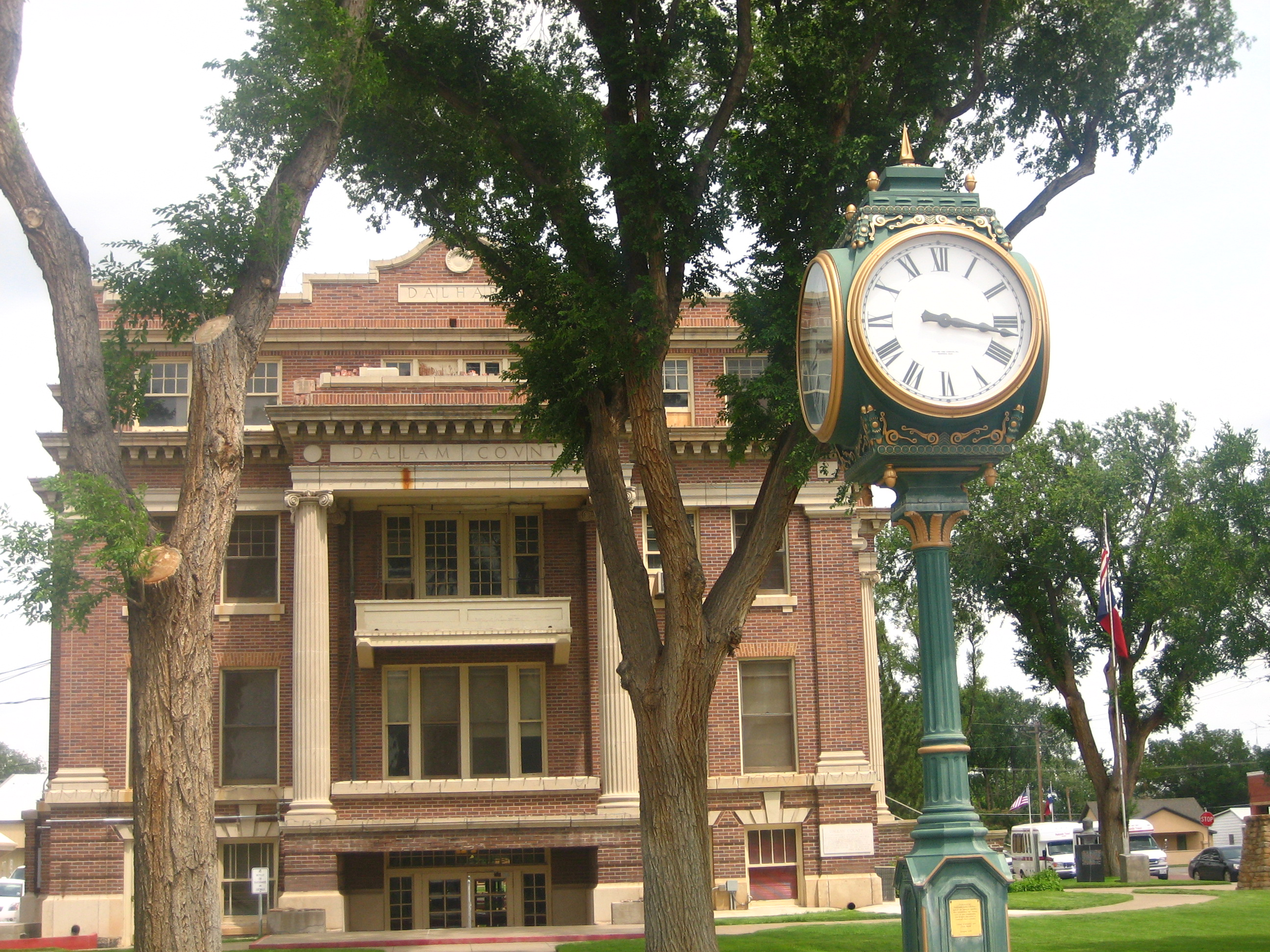
The Dallam County Courthouse in Dalhart, Texas

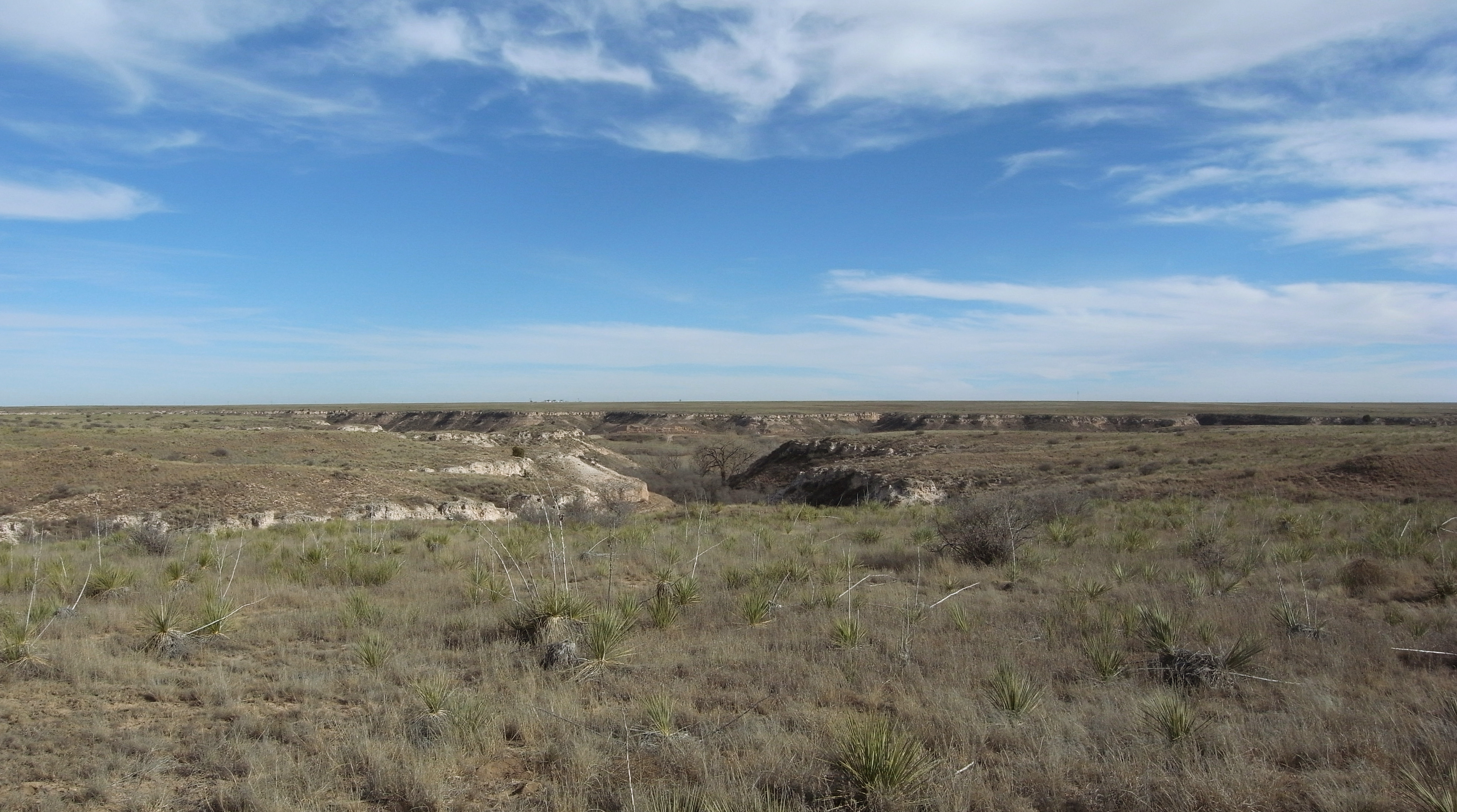
A canyon formed by Tierra Blanca Creek

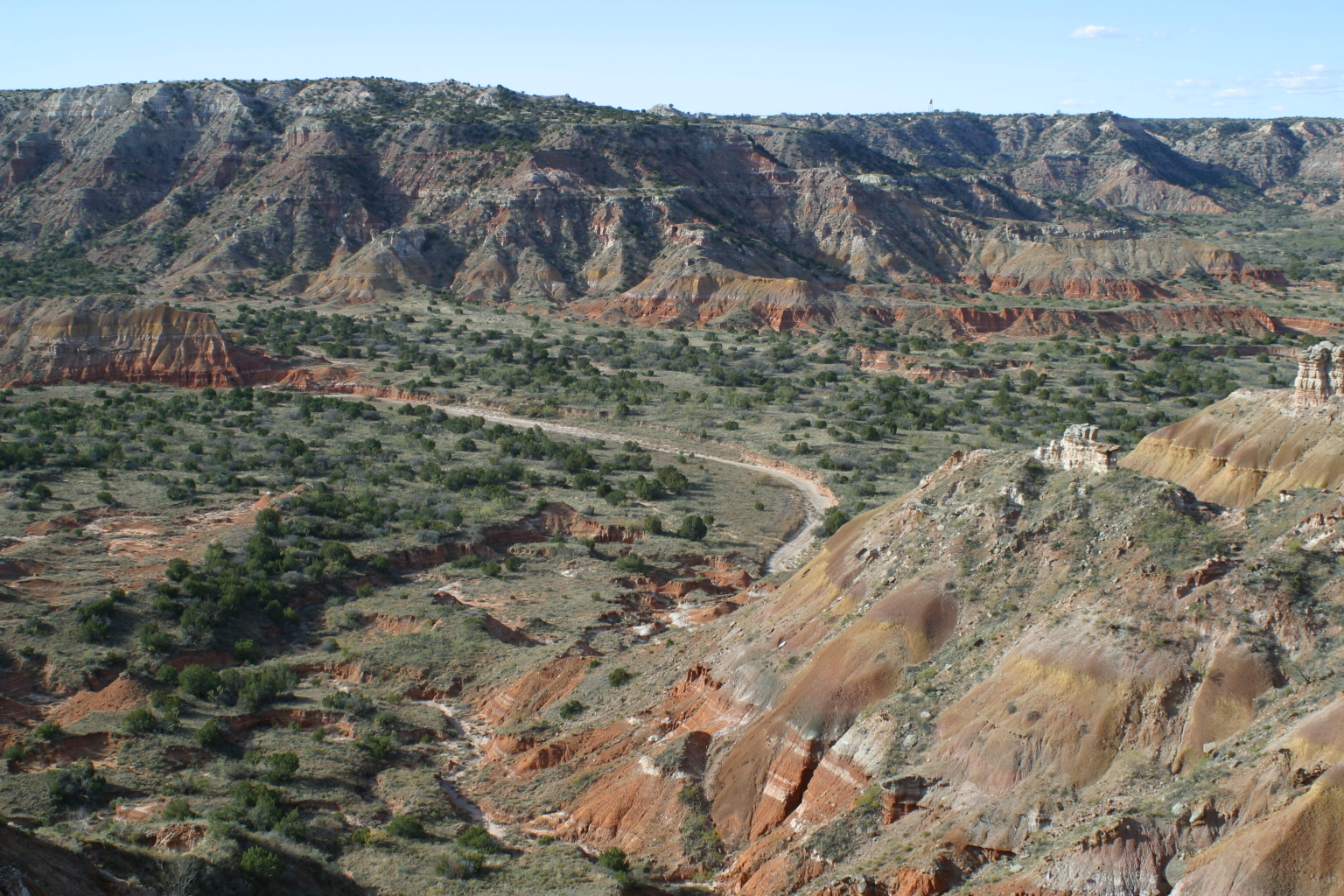
The rugged country of Palo Duro Canyon

A postcard of the Leaning Tower of Texas, c. 1950s

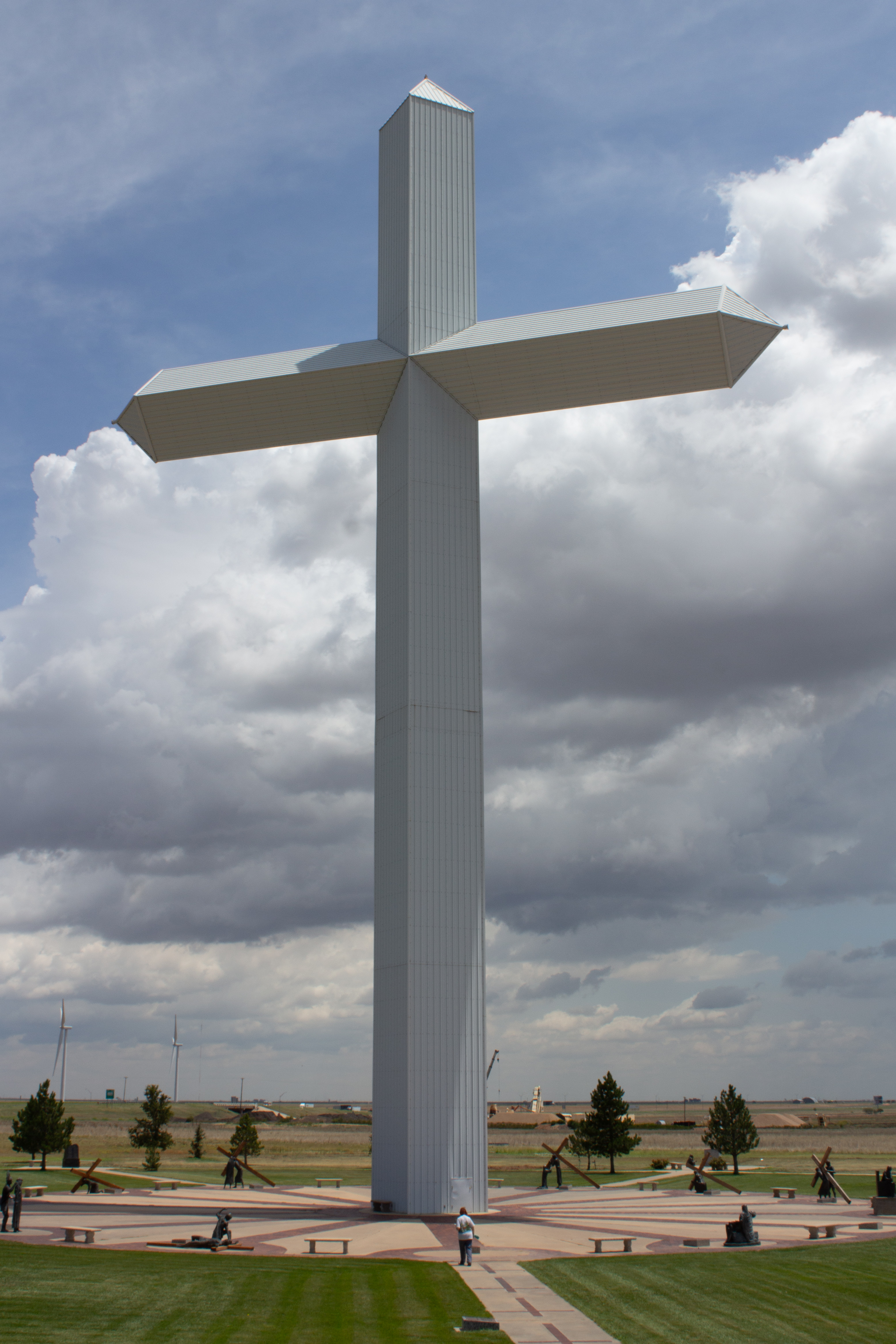
The Cross of Our Lord Jesus Christ along Interstate 40 in Groom, Texas

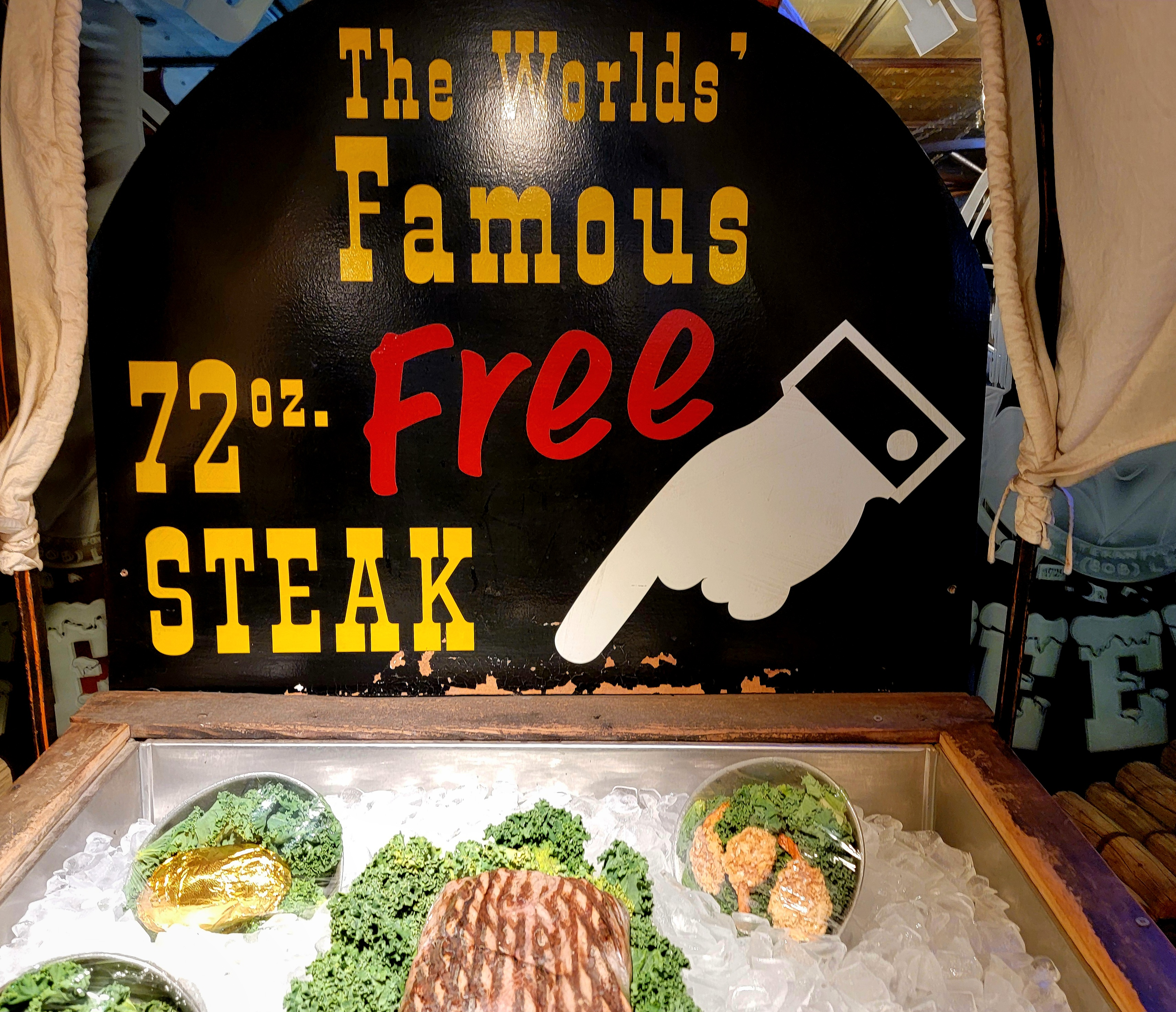
The 72 ounce steak challenge at the Big Texan Steak Ranch in Amarillo, Texas

Texas U.S. Route 66 sign in Amarillo, Texas

== See also ==
- Antelope Creek phase
- Big Die-Up
- Buffalo Lake National Wildlife Refuge
- List of geographical regions in Texas
- List of airports in the Texas Panhandle
- Llano Estacado
- Texas State Highway 207
- West Texas
- National Register of Historic Places listings in the High Plains region of Texas
