= Fritch, Texas =

- City
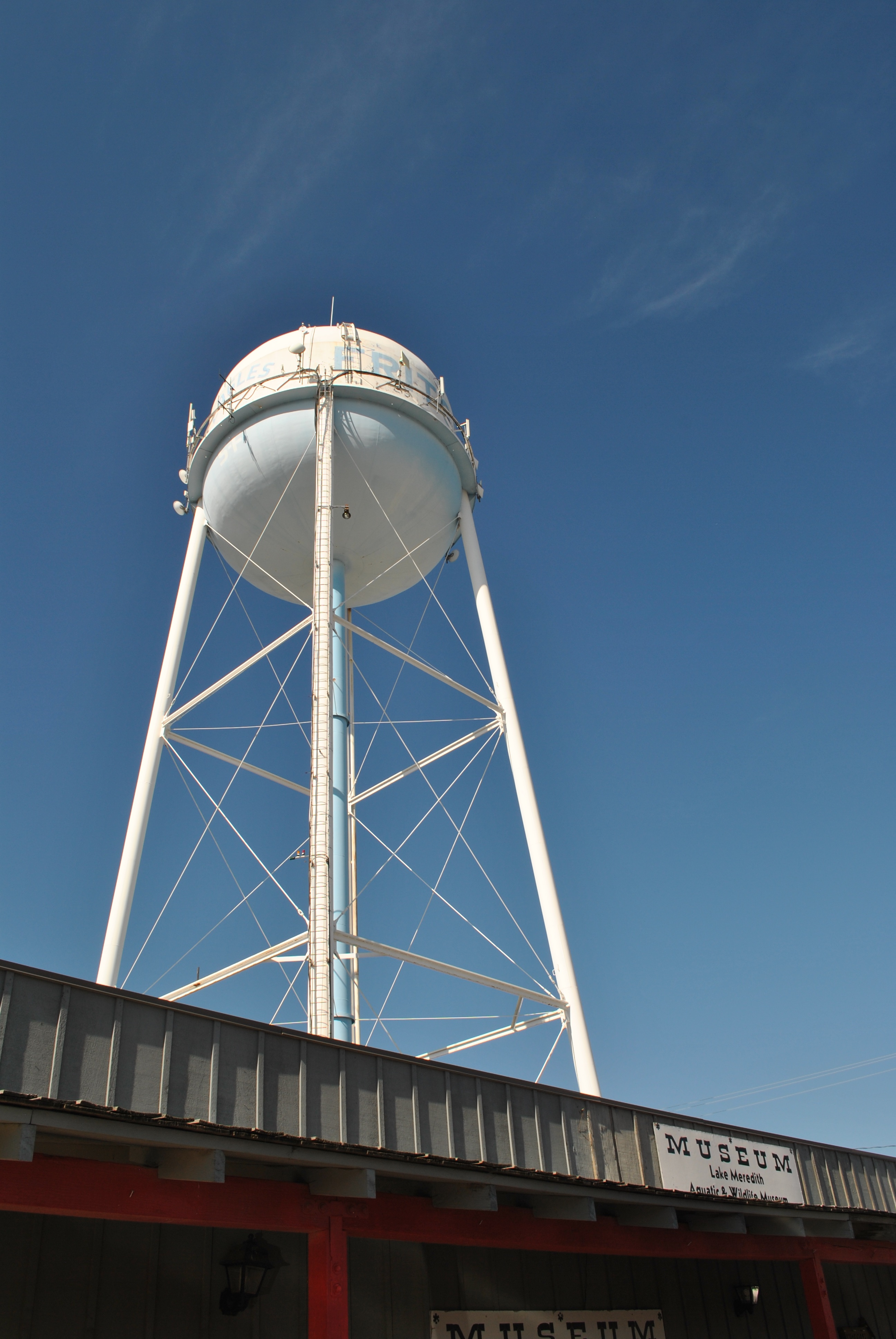
- Fritch water tower

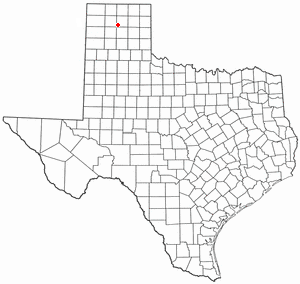
- Location of Fritch, Texas

- Coordinates: 35°38′35″N 101°35′47″W
- Country: United States
- State: Texas
- Counties: Hutchinson, Moore

Area
  - Total: 1.62 sq mi (4.20 km^{2})
  - Land: 1.62 sq mi (4.20 km^{2})
  - Water: 0 sq mi (0.00 km^{2})
- Elevation: 3,189 ft (972 m)

Population (2020)
  - Total: 1,859
  - Density: 1,150/sq mi (443/km^{2})
- Time zone: UTC-6 (Central (CST))
  - Summer (DST): UTC-5 (CDT)
- ZIP code: 79036
- Area code: 806
- FIPS code: 48-27696
- GNIS feature ID: 2410550
- Website: www.fritchcityhall.com

Fritch is a city in Moore and Hutchinson Counties, Texas, United States. The population was 1,859 at the 2020 census.

== History ==
=== 1992 tornado ===
On June 27, 1992, a mile-wide, multi-vortex F4 tornado struck the Fritch area, resulting in major damage to the city with 100 homes destroyed and seven injuries, but no loss of life.

=== 2014 wildfire ===
On May 11, 2014, a fast-moving wildfire in the area began, causing much destruction and loss of homes in the Fritch area, which was evacuated by authorities. Media reported 100 structures destroyed with numerous people in local shelters.

== Geography ==
Fritch is located in the southwest corner of Hutchinson County at the geographic center of the Texas Panhandle region. It is 35 miles (56 km) north-northeast of Amarillo and 13 miles (21 km) west of Borger. Fritch sits in an area where the typically flat High Plains are divided into canyons and draws by the Canadian River. The city sits on flat land surrounded by undulating terrain.

Lake Meredith on the Canadian River lies 2 miles (3 km) northwest of the city and is a main source of water for surrounding communities, though Fritch uses water drawn from the Ogallala Aquifer for its municipal supply.

== Demographics ==
Historical population
Census	Pop.	Note	%±
1960	1,617		—
1970	1,778		10.0%
1980	2,299		29.3%
1990	2,335		1.6%
2000	2,235		−4.3%
2010	2,117		−5.3%
2020	1,859		−12.2%
U.S. Decennial Census

=== 2020 census ===
As of the 2020 census, Fritch had a population of 1,859, 787 households, and 616 families.

The median age was 42.6 years; 22.5% of residents were under the age of 18 and 22.2% of residents were 65 years of age or older. For every 100 females there were 103.6 males, and for every 100 females age 18 and over there were 101.7 males age 18 and over.

0.0% of residents lived in urban areas, while 100.0% lived in rural areas.

Of the 787 households in Fritch, 29.1% had children under the age of 18 living in them. Married-couple households made up 53.0% of all households, 17.0% had a male householder with no spouse or partner present, and 25.4% had a female householder with no spouse or partner present. About 27.1% of households consisted of individuals and 12.1% had someone living alone who was 65 years of age or older.

There were 909 housing units in the city, of which 13.4% were vacant. The homeowner vacancy rate was 4.7% and the rental vacancy rate was 10.6%.

Racial composition as of the 2020 census
Race	Number	Percent
White	1,641	88.3%
Black or African American	8	0.4%
American Indian and Alaska Native	25	1.3%
Asian	4	0.2%
Native Hawaiian and Other Pacific Islander	0	0.0%
Some other race	28	1.5%
Two or more races	153	8.2%
Hispanic or Latino (of any race)	135	7.3%

=== 2000 census ===
As of the census of 2000, 2,235 people, 886 households, and 679 families resided in the city. The population density was 1,840.9 inhabitants per square mile (710.8/km^{2}). The 961 housing units averaged 791.5 units per square mile (305.6 units/km^{2}). The racial makeup of the city was 95.53% White, 0.09% African American, 1.66% Native American, 0.13% Asian, 1.30% from other races, and 1.30% from two or more races. Hispanics or Latinos of any race were 4.30% of the population.

Of the 886 households, 34.7% had children under the age of 18 living with them, 66.3% were married couples living together, 8.1% had a female householder with no husband present, and 23.3% were not families. About 21.6% of all households were made up of individuals, and 11.7% had someone living alone who was 65 years of age or older. The average household size was 2.52 and the average family size was 2.93.

In the city, the population was distributed as 26.4% under the age of 18, 7.5% from 18 to 24, 25.8% from 25 to 44, 24.0% from 45 to 64, and 16.4% who were 65 years of age or older. The median age was 39 years. For every 100 females, there were 98.1 males. For every 100 females age 18 and over, there were 93.6 males.

The median income for a household in the city was $42,098, and a family was $46,600. Males had a median income of $41,134 versus $21,860 for females. The per capita income for the city was $17,745. None of the population were below the poverty line.

Fritch is primarily a bedroom community, with the majority of citizens commuting to nearby Borger and Amarillo for work. Major employers in the area include Pantex, ConocoPhillips, and Agrium, all located within a short distance of Fritch. Due to its nature as a commuting town, Fritch differs from most small towns in the region, which rely more on agriculture as their economic base. Though several large ranches are adjacent to the town, little to no farming occurs due to the uneven topography, and the town has few agriculture-related services.

== Recreation ==
Fritch is located adjacent to the Lake Meredith National Recreation Area, which offers residents and visitors ample opportunities for outdoor activities including boating, fishing, camping, hiking, and seasonal hunting. Alibates Flint Quarries National Monument is 10 miles (16 km) southwest of Fritch along Lake Meredith. The city is home to the Lake Meredith Historical Museum.

== Notable people ==
- John LaGrone (1944–2022), American football player and judge
- Krum (born 1977), rapper
- Ron White (born 1956), comedian

== Education ==
Fritch is served by the Sanford-Fritch Independent School District.

== Images ==
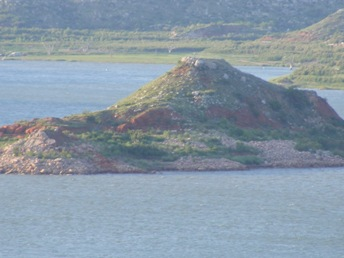
Rattlesnake Island in Lake Meredith

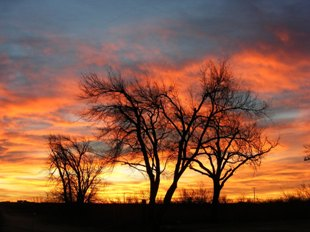
Sunrise near Fritch, TX

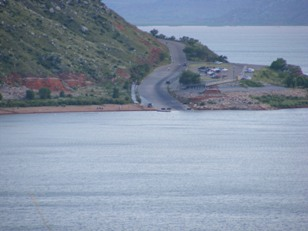
Fritch Fortress boat ramp on Lake Meredith

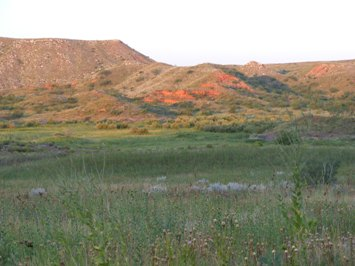
Canadian River wetlands near Fritch, TX
