= Lake Meredith National Recreation Area =

National Recreation Area of the United States in Texas

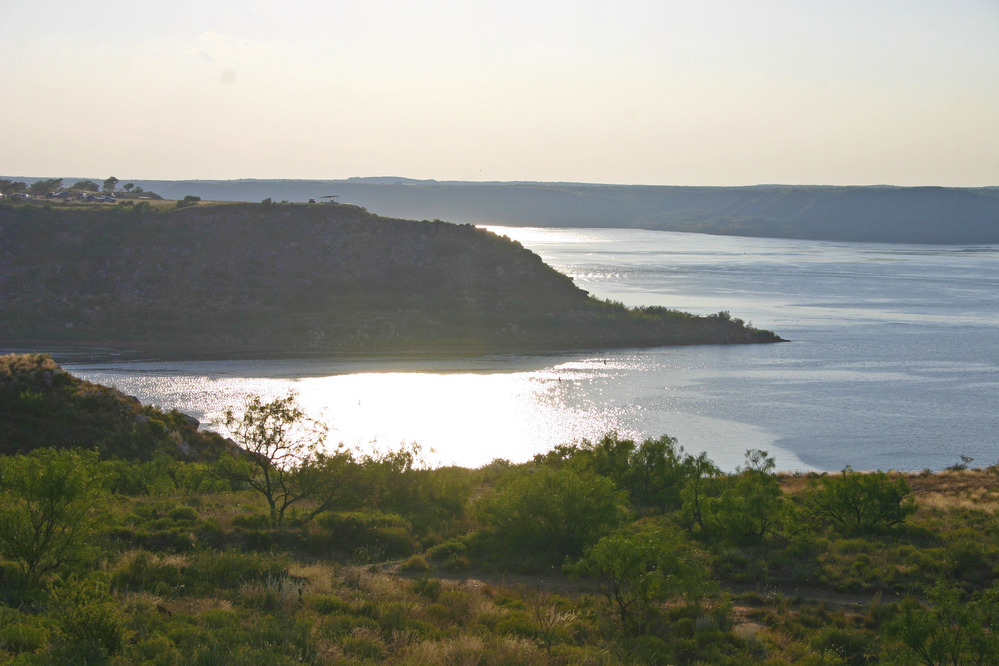
- Lake Meredith at sunset

- Location within Texas Location within the United States
- Location: Potter / Moore / Hutchinson counties, Texas, United States
- Nearest city: Amarillo, Texas
- Coordinates: 35°42′53″N 101°33′10″W
- Area: 44,978 acres (18,202 ha)
- Established: November 28, 1990
- Visitors: 1,276,717 (in 2022)
- Governing body: National Park Service
- Website: Lake Meredith National Recreation Area

Lake Meredith National Recreation Area is a United States national recreation area located about 30 miles (48 km) north of Amarillo, Texas, in the Texas Panhandle. Its main attraction is 10,000-acre (4,000 ha) Lake Meredith, a reservoir created by Sanford Dam on the Canadian River.

Activities at Lake Meredith include boating, fishing, swimming, camping, hiking, and hunting. Five boat launch ramps remain open, and one marina previously provided access to the lake, however the marina closed during the drought of 2011–2013. Park headquarters are in Fritch.

Visitors to Lake Meredith peaked at over 1.94 million in 1984, but with record-low water levels, visitation fell from 1.08 million in 2009 to 502,457 in 2012.

Alibates Flint Quarries National Monument is located adjacent to Lake Meredith National Recreation Area.

== Gallery ==
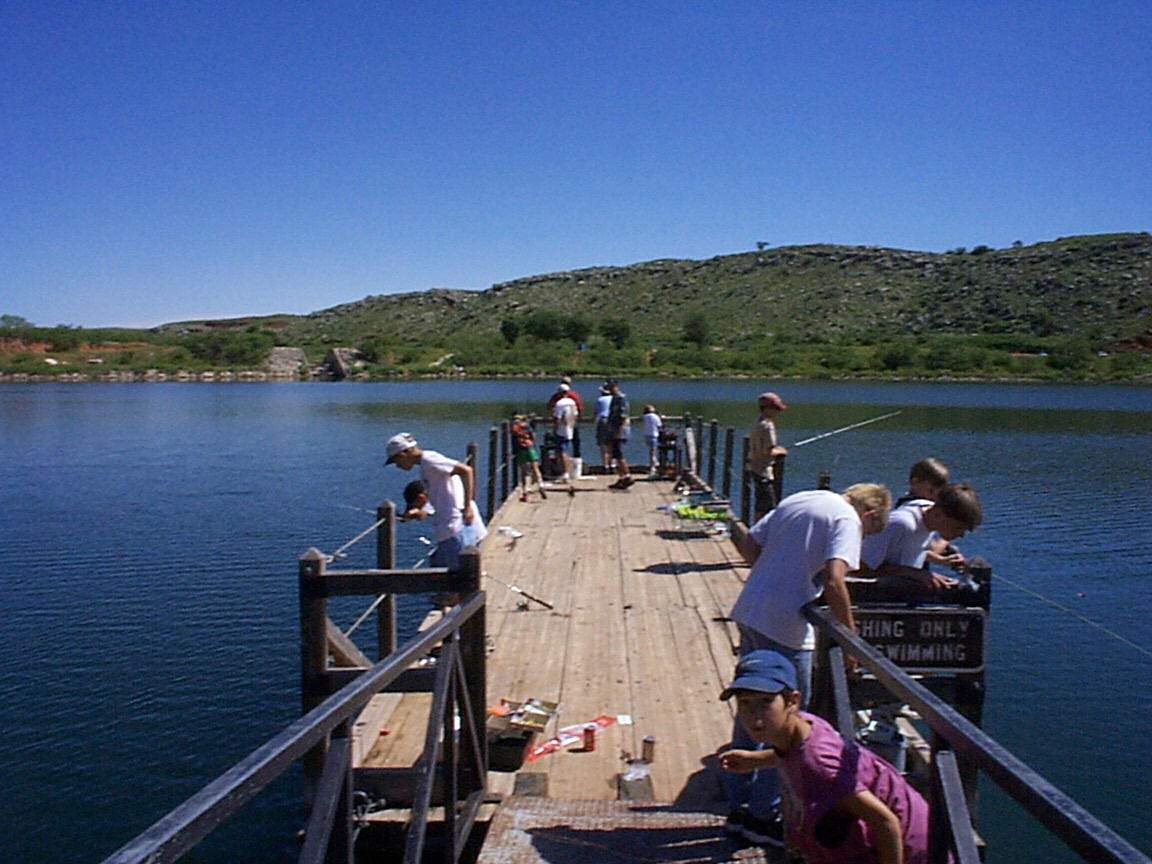
The Small Fry fishing tournament in the Stilling Basin at Lake Meredith

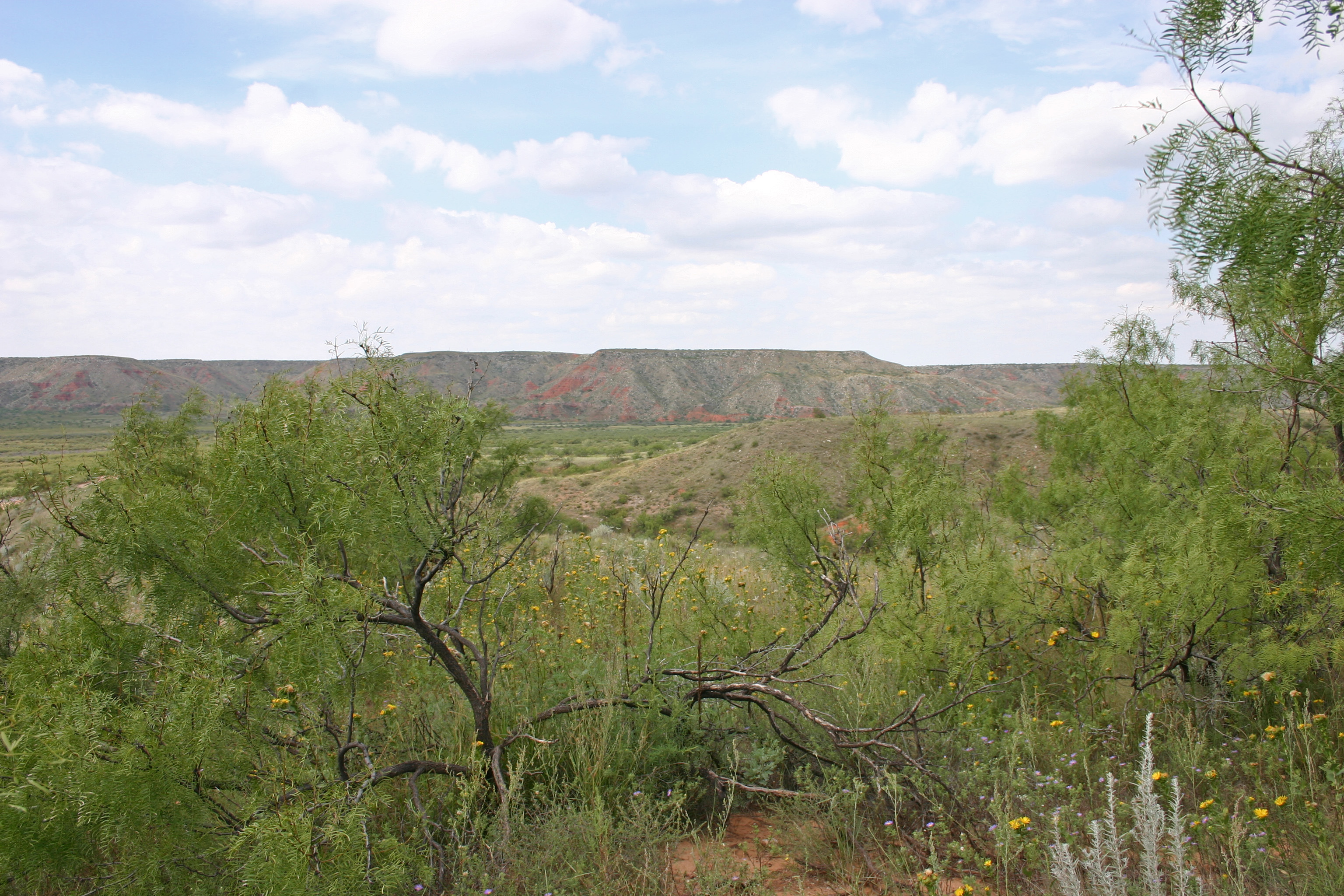
View from Lake Meredith

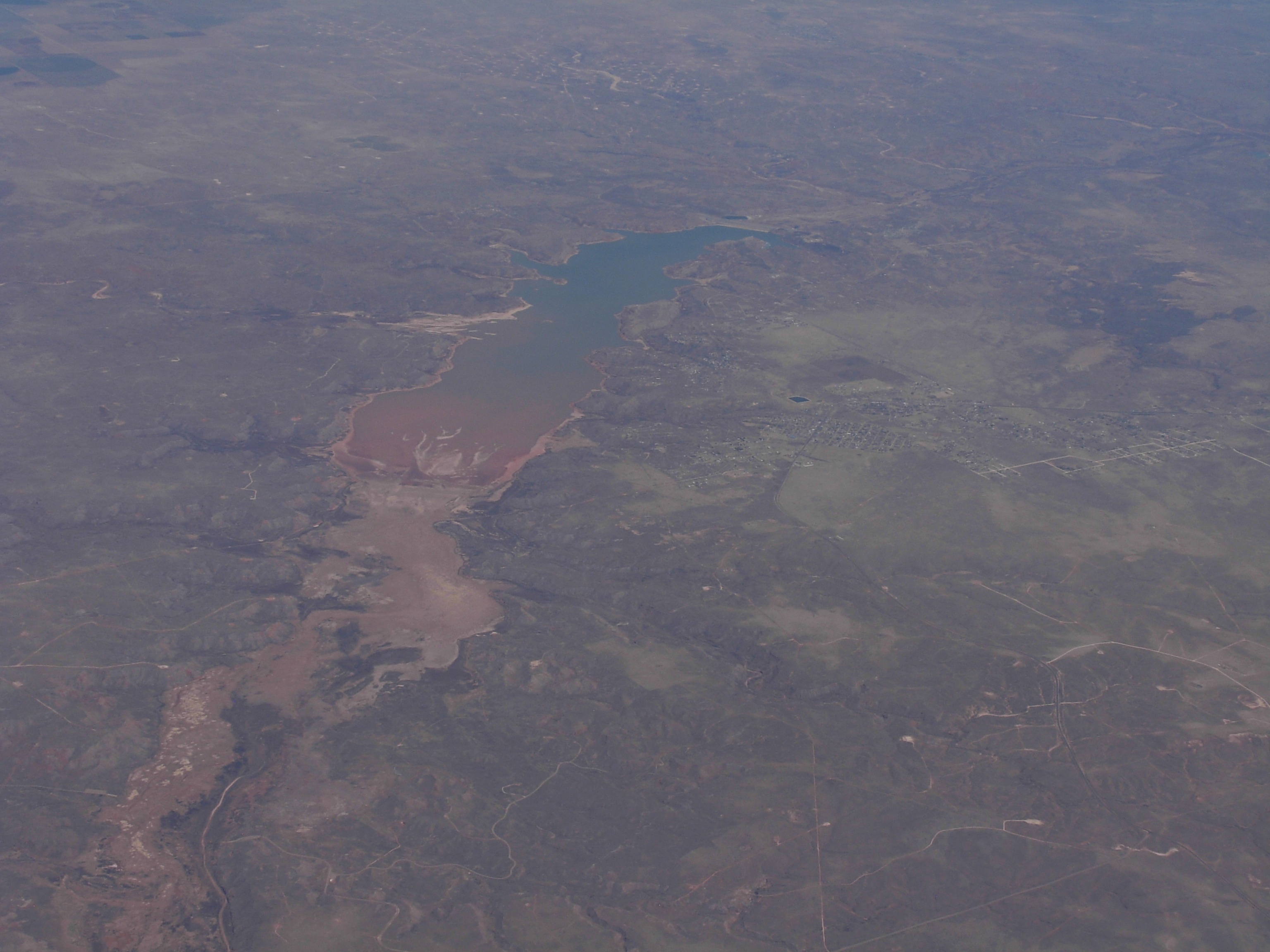
Aerial view
