= Sanford-Fritch Independent School District =

School district in Texas

Sanford-Fritch Independent School District is a public school district based in Fritch, Texas (USA).

In addition to Fritch, the district serves the city of Sanford as well as rural areas in southwestern Hutchinson County. Small portions of Carson and Moore counties also lie within the district.

In 2009, the school district was rated "academically acceptable" by the Texas Education Agency.

In 2015, the school district received the highest accountability rating of "Met Standard" by the Texas Education Agency.

Sanford-Fritch is the home of the "Eagles", their mascot. Sanford-Fritch ISD is classified as a 2a school district.

According to the districts website, the current Superintendent is Kim Surles.

== Schools ==
- Sanford-Fritch High (Grades 9–12)
- Sanford-Fritch Junior High (Grades 6–8)
- Sanford-Fritch Elementary (Grades PK-5)

== Other buildings ==
- Sanford-Fritch Administration Building
