= Lake Meredith =

Man-made lake in Texas, United States

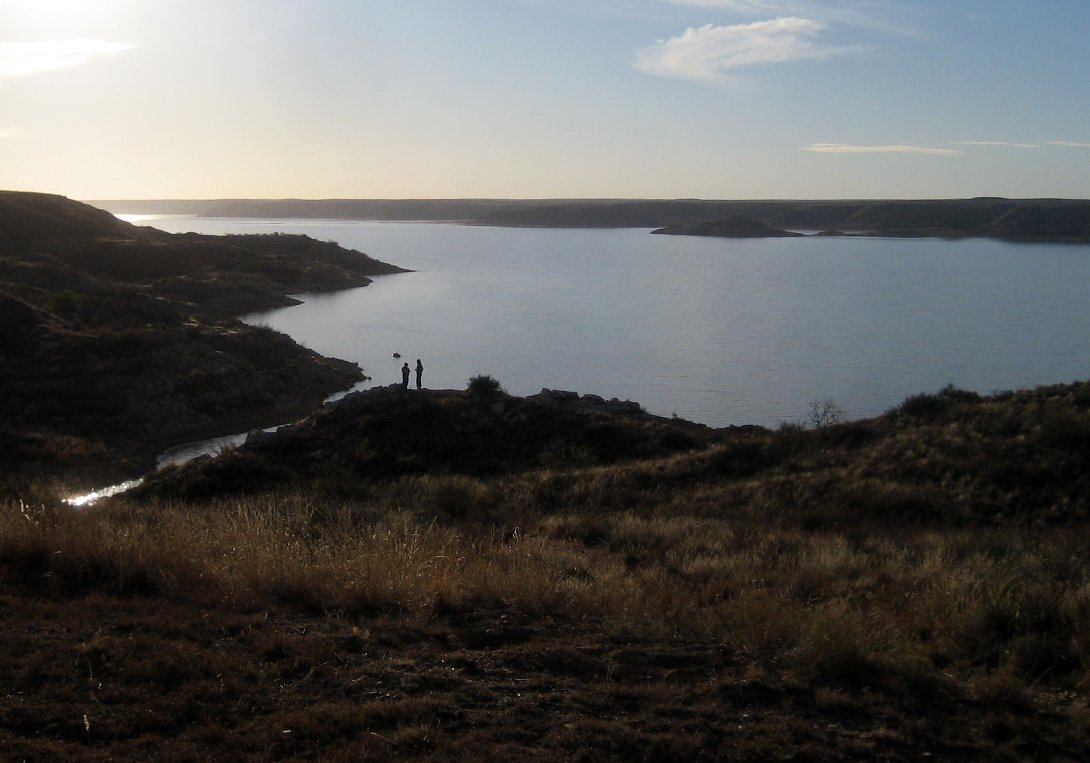
- Lake Meredith in November 2009

- Location within Texas Location within the United States
- Location: Hutchinson / Moore / Potter counties, Texas Panhandle, Texas, US
- Coordinates: 35°42′51″N 101°33′11″W
- Lake type: reservoir
- Primary inflows: Canadian River
- Primary outflows: Canadian River
- Basin countries: United States
- Surface area: 21,640 acres (87.6 km^{2})
- Water volume: 779,556 acre⋅ft (961,568,000 m^{3})
- Surface elevation: Pool 2,936.50 ft (895.05 m)

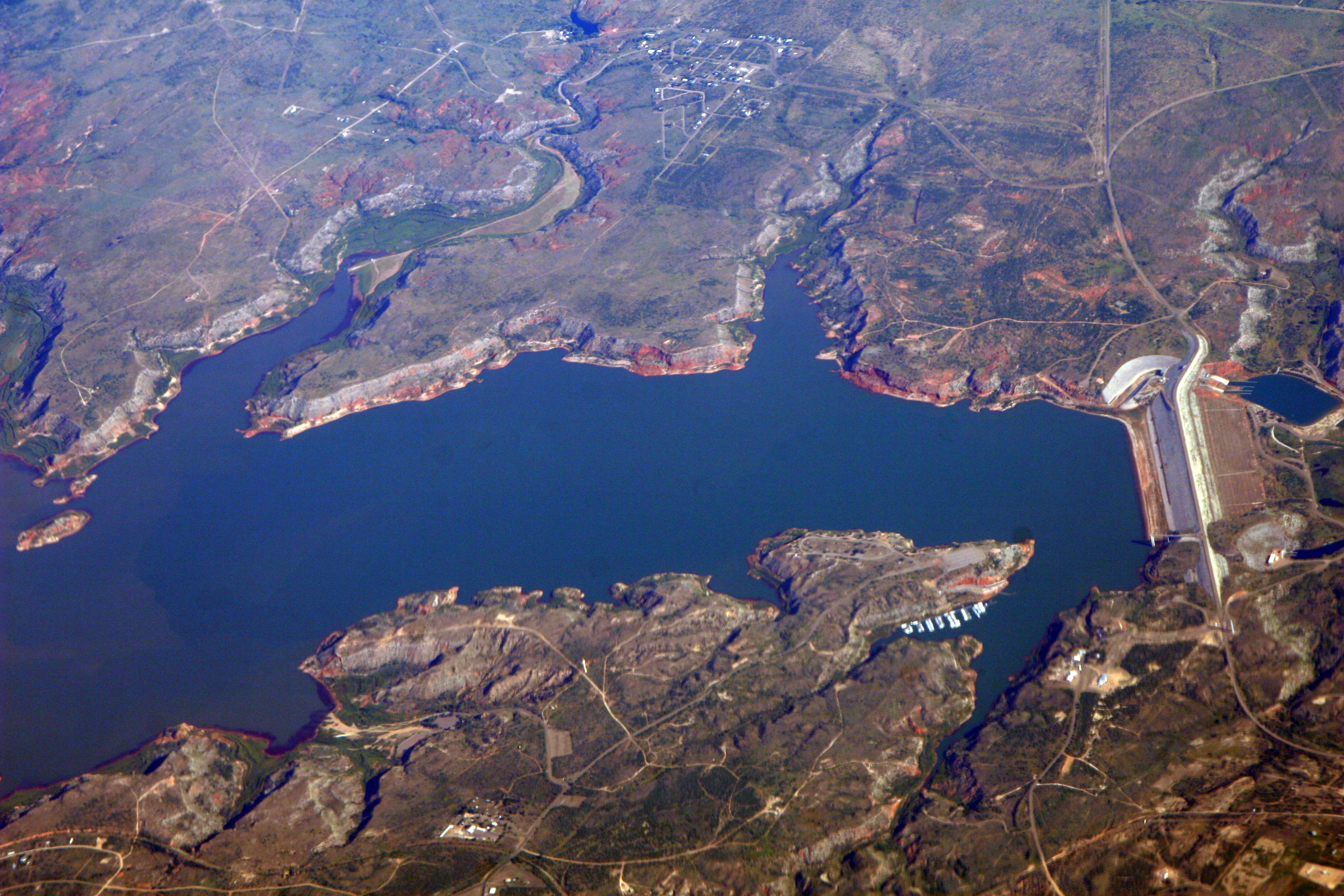
Lake Meredith aerial 2007

Lake Meredith is a reservoir formed by Sanford Dam on the Canadian River at Sanford, Texas. It is about 30 miles (48 km) northeast of Amarillo, Texas in the Texas Panhandle. It is named for A.A. Meredith, the former city manager of Borger, Texas. It historically was a major source of drinking water for Amarillo and Lubbock, Texas, located about 150 miles (240 km) to the south along with many other towns in between and nearby. Sanford Dam was constructed starting in 1962 with completion in 1965. In 2003, the Canadian River Municipal Water Authority announced that it would reduce allocations to its member cities due to an ongoing drought and a continued drop in the water level in the reservoir. As of 2008, the lake continued to hit record lows, and most of the water supplied by CRMWA is now coming from wells in Roberts County. In 2011, water withdrawals from Lake Meredith temporarily ceased and on August 7, 2013, the lake reached its all-time low 26.14 feet (7.97 m). The record high capacity was in April 1973 when the lake was 101.85 feet (31.04 m) deep. Lake depth as of October 14, 2017 was 73.12 feet (22.29 m) deep.

Lake depth as of June 17, 2025 was 78.27 feet (23.86 m) deep.

On June 1, 2008, the remains of a Beechcraft Skipper airplane were found in the receding lake. The plane, reported missing on January 27, 1984, was on a two-hour flight carrying the pilot, Steven Lampe, 25 and Larry Lucas, both of Amarillo, Texas. There had been no eyewitnesses to the crash.

Much of the political credit for the establishment of Lake Meredith has gone to the late State Senator Grady Hazlewood of Amarillo.

== Recreational activities ==
Since its designation as a National Recreation Area, Lake Meredith has been an attraction for various recreational activities, including camping, fishing, and water sports of all types. Its long narrow profile and numerous coves make power boat sports (water skiing, tubing, wake boarding, etc.) especially popular. Due to the region's normally windy summer seasons, the coves are popular spots for such water sports due to their natural protection from the winds that often make the open lake waters too choppy for these activities. It also features camping at several sites around the lake, along with five beach areas, one accessible only by boat. Fishing stock includes sand bass and walleye. Anglers may also hope to land several other desirable species of fish such as crappie, perch, carp, large mouth bass, and small mouth bass. The drought from 2011 to 2013 took a big toll, not only on the water level, but also on the local economy of Fritch, Texas. Lake Meredith is now enjoying recovery due to consecutive rainy seasons since 2014. The reservoir's water level has risen over fifty feet since the record low was set on August 7, 2013.

Boat ramps are located at Sanford Yake, Cedar Canyon, Fritch Fortress, Harbor Bay, and Blue West. All ramps are open as of June 17, 2019.

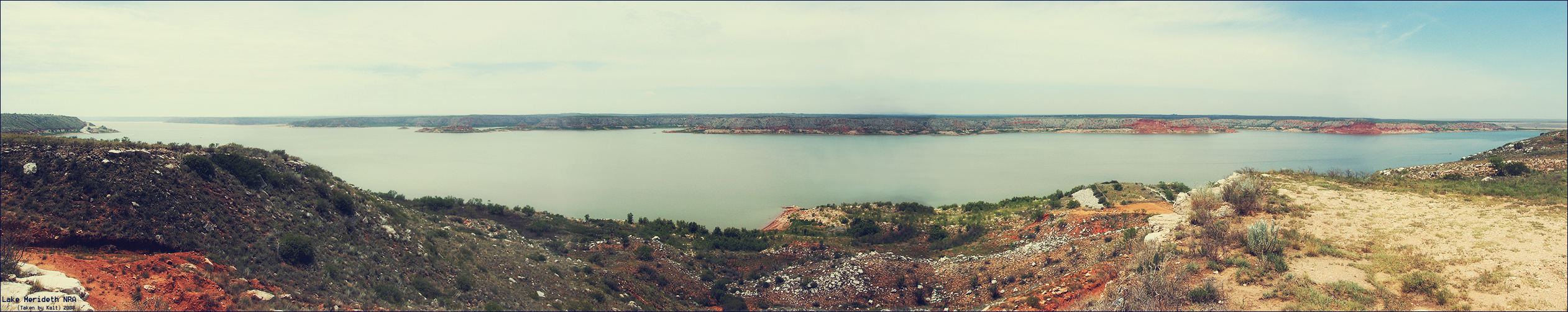
Lake Meredith panorama in 2008

== See also ==
- Lake Meredith National Recreation Area
