= Midpoint Café =

Restaurant in Adrian, Texas

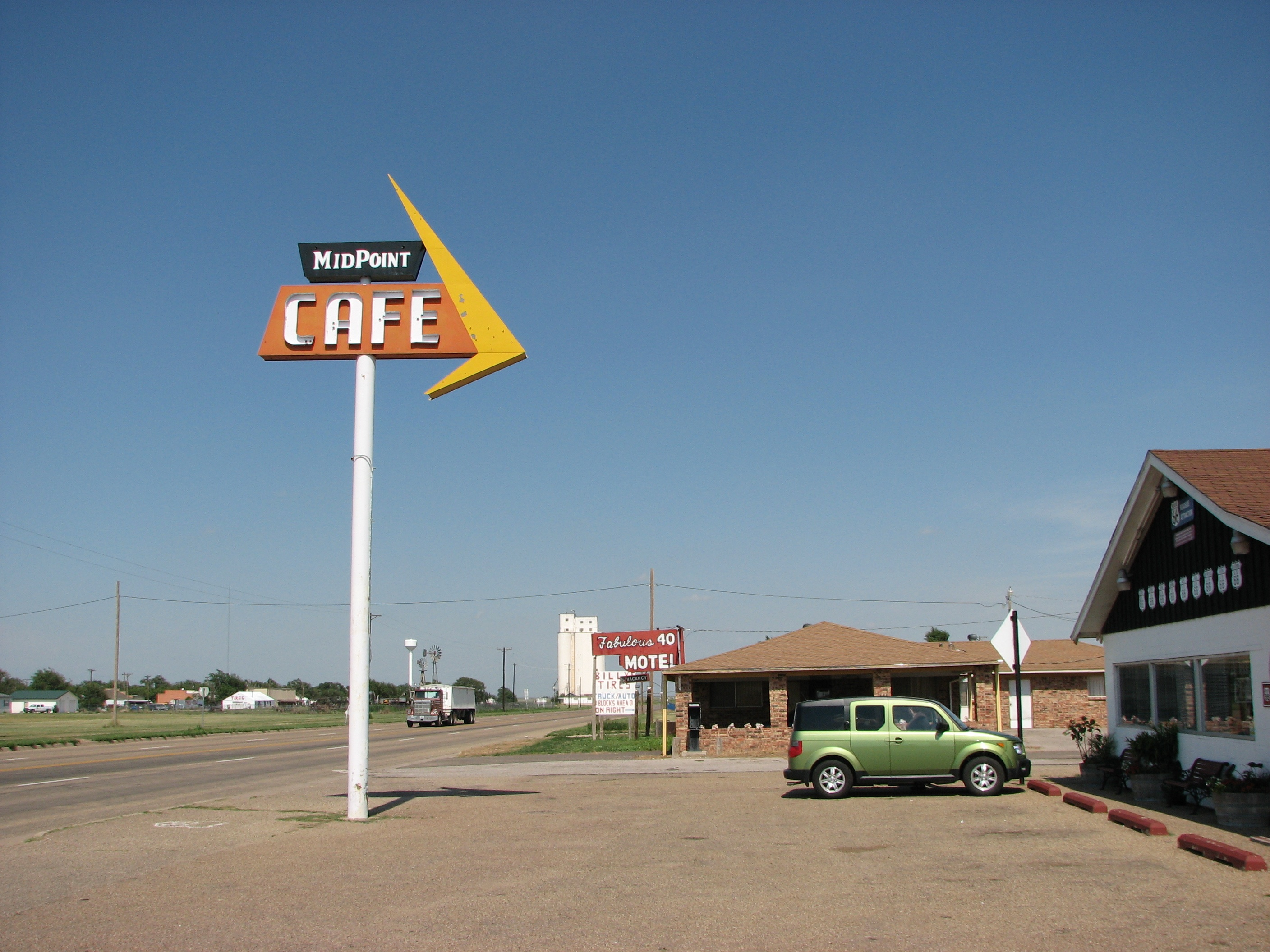
- Midpoint Café in Adrian, Texas
- Interactive map of the Midpoint Café area
- Former names: Zella's, Jesse's, Peggy's, Rachel's, Adrian Café

General information
- Location: 5100 Old 66, Adrian, Texas, United States
- Coordinates: 35.271°N 102.6729°W
- Completed: 1928
- Owner: Donna and Dennis Purschwitz

Other information
- Parking: on-site

The Midpoint Café, a restaurant, souvenir and antique shop on U.S. Route 66 in Adrian, Texas, bills itself as geographically the midway point between Los Angeles and Chicago on historic Route 66. Signage in Adrian proudly declares a 1139-mile distance to each original US 66 endpoint; the café's slogan is "when you're here, you're halfway there".

Fran Houser, owner of the Midpoint Café from 1990 until 2012, is the basis for Flo of "Flo's V-8 Café" in Cars.

== History ==
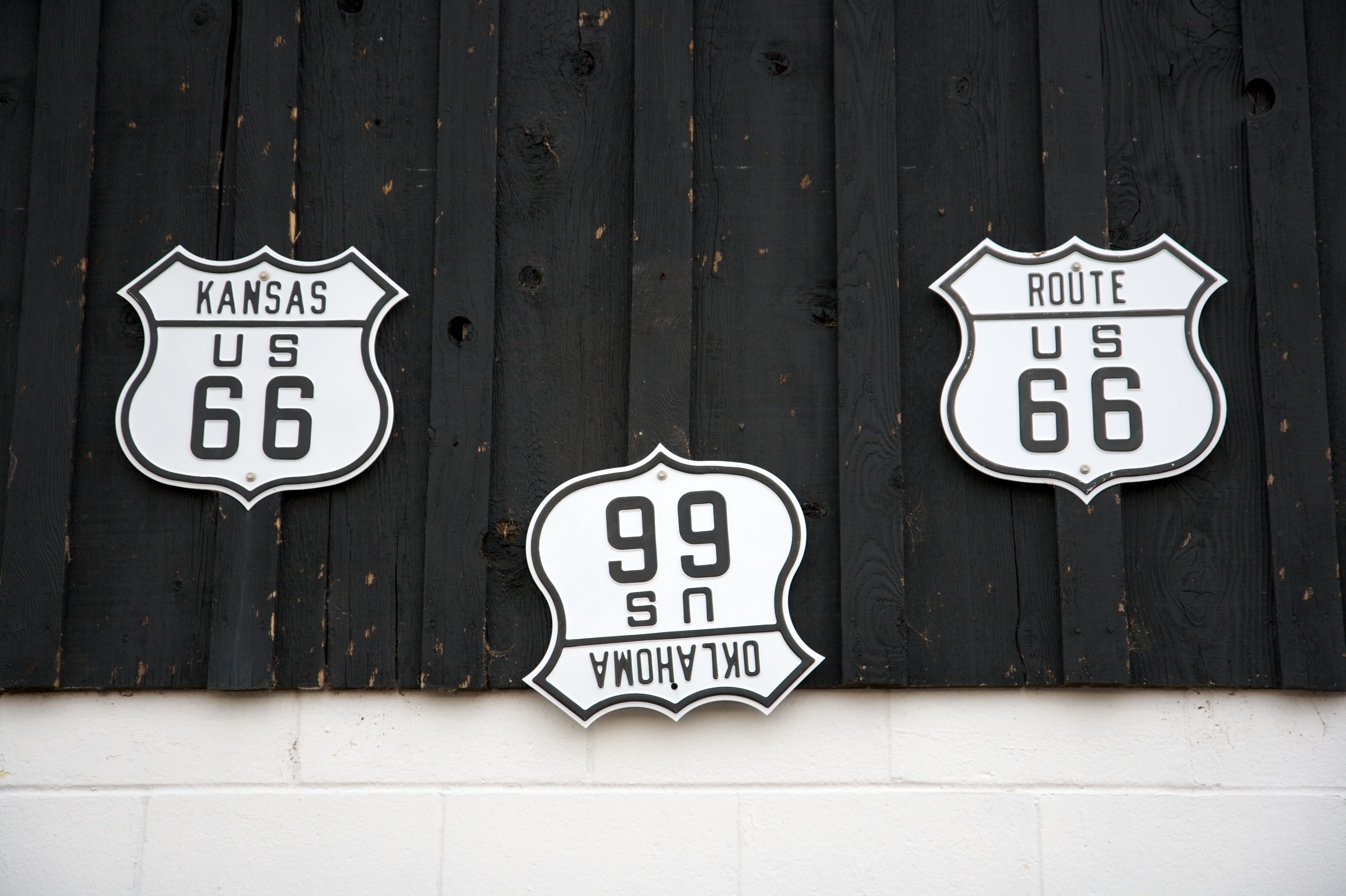
Various US 66 markers posted outside the Midpoint Café

The café, built in 1928 and expanded in 1947, operated 24 hours a day during Route 66's heyday and is the oldest continuously operating Route 66 café between Amarillo, Texas and Tucumcari, New Mexico.

Its origins can be traced to a one-room, dirt-floor brick café known as Zella's, built by Jeannie VanderWort and leased to Zella Crim. The restaurant changed hands several times. Dub Edmunds and Jesse Fincher acquired the property in 1956, operating it and an adjacent filling station as Jesse's Café until 1976. It became well known for its hot, fresh home-made pies.

Adrian was bypassed by Interstate 40 in 1969, leading to an abrupt decline in traffic through the village. I-40 in Texas replaced US 66 in-place except within individual towns, which were bypassed by retaining the old main street as a business loop. Most of Route 66 in Texas was turned into frontage road for the new Interstate highway or disappeared entirely.

As business declined, the local Adrian population dropped to approximately 220 in the late 20th century and an estimated 149 in 2008.

The café was sold in 1976 to Terry and Peggy Creitz as Peggy's Café; a subsequent owner changed the name to Rachel's. Fran Houser purchased the business, naming it the Adrian Café, in 1990. Her original plan was to establish an antique shop at the site.

== Renaissance ==
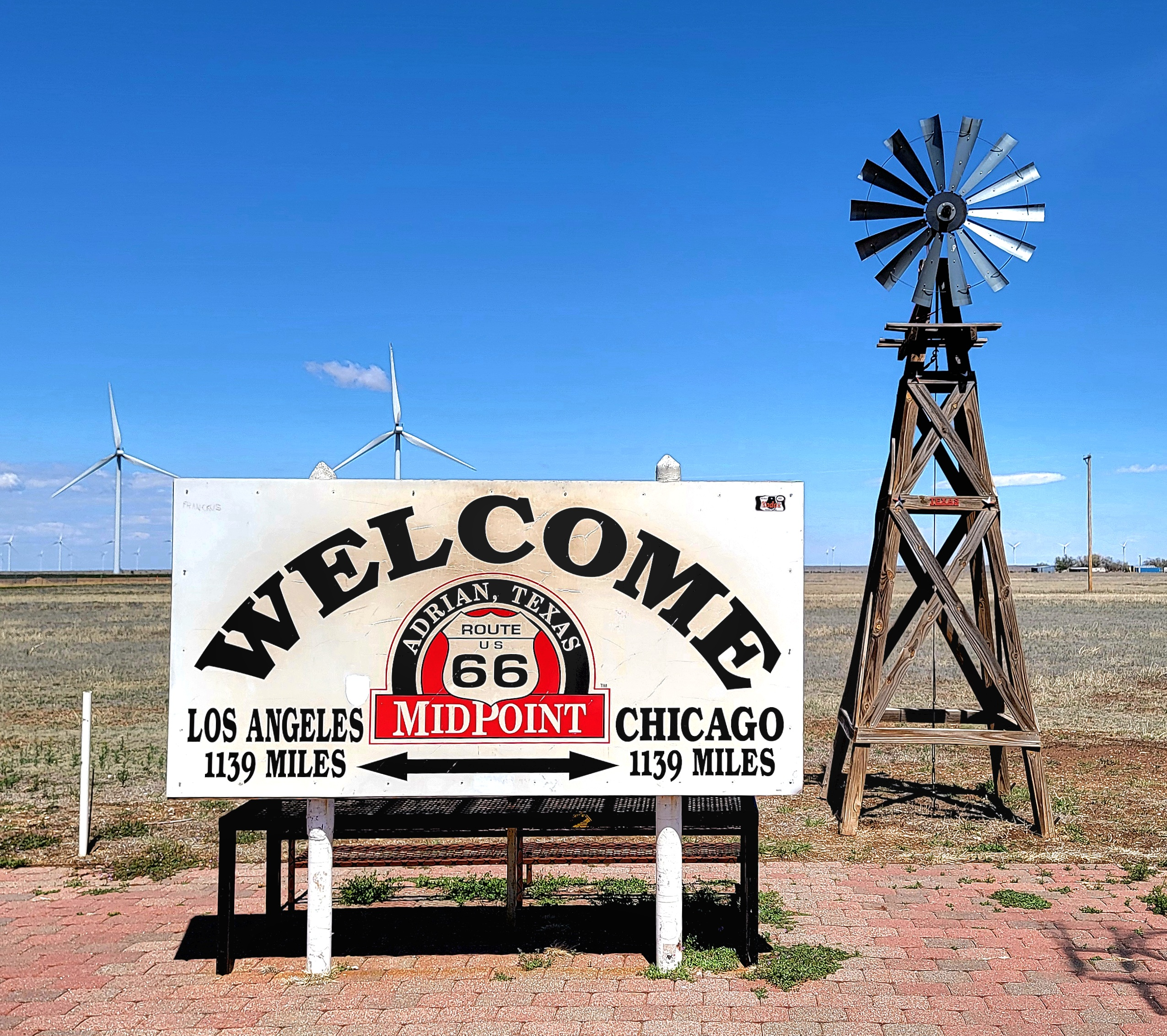
Sign at Midpoint Café

Efforts to put "Historic Route 66" back on the map date to 1987, with Angel Delgadillo's Arizona Historic Route 66 Association obtaining historic signage on Arizona State Route 66. Other US Route 66 states soon followed, using the "Route 66" brand to attract visitors from as far afield as Europe and Australia.

The Midpoint Café's current name and identity were adopted in 1995 on the advice of travel author and US Route 66 Association founder Tom Snyder.

"The president and founder of the U.S. Route 66 Association called me one day. He said, 'Kid, you better do something because you are at the midway point of Route 66. You need to change that name.'"

— Fran Houser, former owner of the Adrian Café

The shop began selling antiques on consignment by 1997 alongside its "nostalgia food" menu of breakfasts, hamburgers and the homemade desserts which it calls "Ugly Crust Pies". The term "ugly crust" was coined by Joann Harwell, Midpoint Café's pastry chef, who would create various tasty, freshly baked pies (pecan, chocolate chip, apple, lemon meringue and chocolate) using her grandmother's recipe, only to lament that the crusts looked better when her grandmother had made the same pies years ago.

"The main ingredient in any recipe I have is the love that goes with the attempt. I don't make a perfect pie crust, but I've come to see that there's more to life than being perfect. Each pie I have made over the years has a very personal connection to the unconditional love my grandmother provided to me. That's a lot better than perfect."

— Joann Harwell

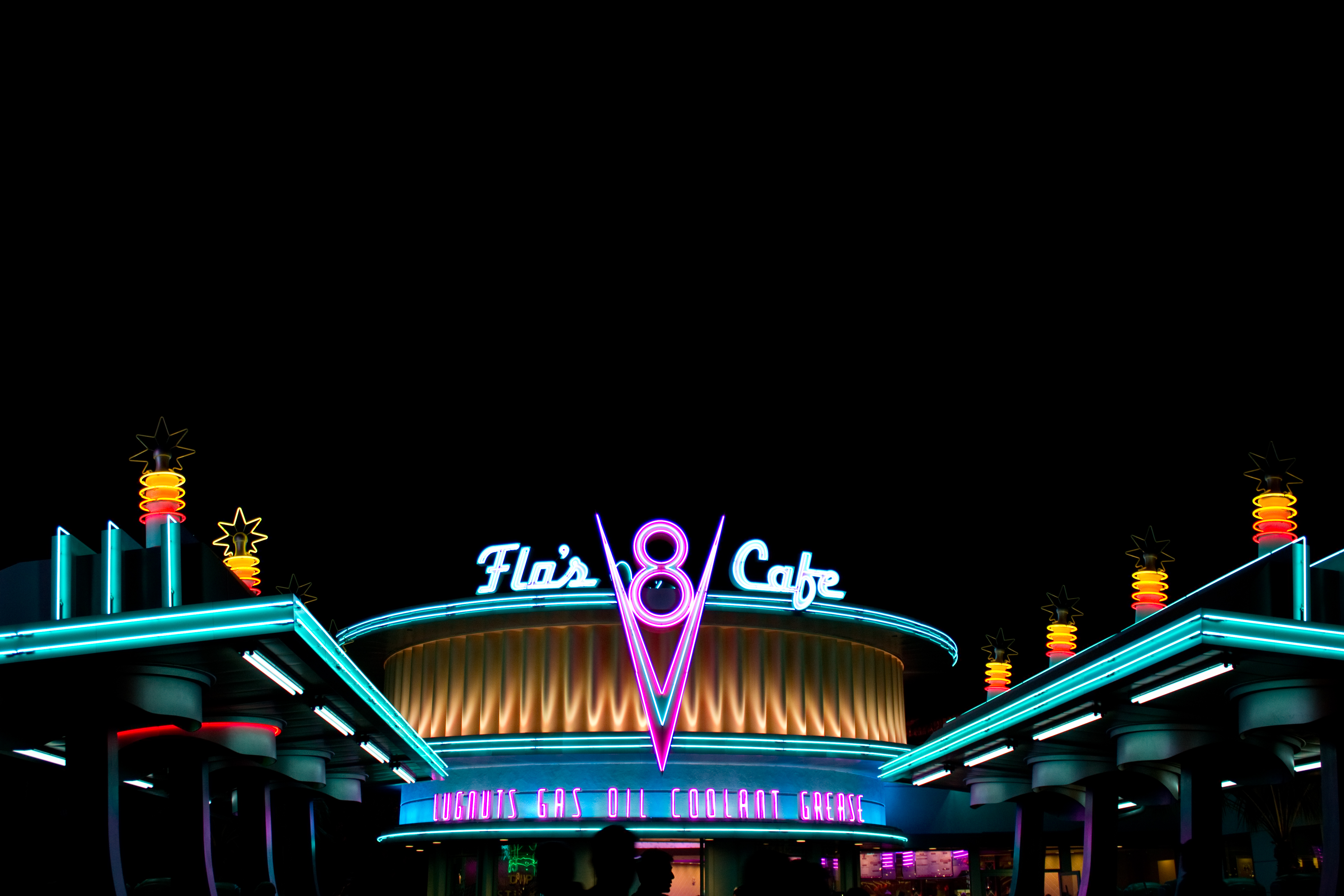
Flo's V8 Café at Disney California Adventure.

In 2001, the roadside café received a visit from Pixar. Fifteen people in a group of rented longhorn Cadillac limousines meticulously photographed landmarks and interviewed Route 66 personalities in five US states, including the 1,200 miles (1,900 km) between Peach Springs, Arizona and Baxter Springs, Kansas. This research was the basis for the town of Radiator Springs in the 2006 animated film Cars.

The Flo, Mia and Tia characters, based on Midpoint Café proprietor Fran Houser and two servers at the restaurant – sisters Mary Lou and Christina Mendez – appear in the film at "Flo's V-8 Café". As a drive-in restaurant for anthropomorphic cars, the automotive-themed Flo's V-8 Café became a filling station which boasts "the finest fuel on Route 66". Fran Houser and the Midpoint Café as "home of the ugly crust pie" are acknowledged in the film's credits. The Disney California Adventure park returns the café as a conventional restaurant, reinstating the legendary "ugly crust pie" recipe to the menu.

Fran Houser retired from the café in 2012, retaining the adjacent former filling station for use as Sunflower Station, an antique and souvenir shop to continue to serve seasonal travellers on US Route 66.
