= Sanford, Texas =

- Town
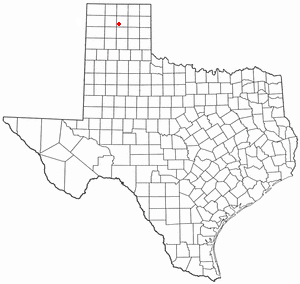
- Location of Sanford, Texas

- Coordinates: 35°42′9″N 101°31′54″W
- Country: United States
- State: Texas
- County: Hutchinson

Area
  - Total: 0.14 sq mi (0.35 km^{2})
  - Land: 0.14 sq mi (0.35 km^{2})
  - Water: 0 sq mi (0.00 km^{2})
- Elevation: 3,028 ft (923 m)

Population (2020)
  - Total: 132
  - Density: 980/sq mi (380/km^{2})
- Time zone: UTC-6 (Central (CST))
  - Summer (DST): UTC-5 (CDT)
- ZIP code: 79078
- Area code: 806
- FIPS code: 48-65384
- GNIS feature ID: 2413257

Sanford is a town in Hutchinson County, Texas, United States. Its population was 132 at the 2020 census.

== History ==
Sanford was established in 1927 following discovery of natural gas in what became known as the Panhandle Gas Field. The town was named for pioneer rancher James McEuin Sanford (1864–1933).

== Geography ==
Sanford is located in southwestern Hutchinson County at the intersection of Ranch Roads 687 and 1319. It is 1 mile (1.6 km) southeast of the Sanford Dam on the Canadian River, forming Lake Meredith, and it is 11 miles (18 km) northwest of Borger, the county seat.

According to the United States Census Bureau, the town of Sanford has a total area of 0.14 square miles (0.35 km^{2}), all land.

== Demographics ==
Historical population
Census	Pop.	Note	%±
1970	181		—
1980	249		37.6%
1990	218		−12.4%
2000	203		−6.9%
2010	164		−19.2%
2020	132		−19.5%
U.S. Decennial Census; 2020 Census

As of the census of 2000, 203 people, 82 households, and 59 families were residing in the town. The population density was 1,517 inhabitants per square mile (586/km^{2}). The 113 housing units had an average density of 844 per square mile (326/km^{2}). The racial makeup of the town was 95.57% White, 1.48% Native American, 0.49% from other races, and 2.46% from two or more races. Hispanics or Latinos of any race were 5.42% of the population.

Of the 82 households, 28.0% had children under 18 living with them, 57.3% were married couples living together, 11.0% had a female householder with no husband present, and 28.0% were not families. About 26.8% of all households were made up of individuals, and 9.8% had someone living alone who was 65 or older. The average household size was 2.48 and the average family size was 3.02.

In the town, the age distribution was 25.6% under 18, 8.9% from 18 to 24, 25.6% from 25 to 44, 23.2% from 45 to 64, and 16.7% who were 65 or older. The median age was 40 years. For every 100 females, there were 109.3 males. For every 100 females 18 and over, there were 112.7 males.

The median income for a household in the town was $28,672, and for a family was $29,375. Males had a median income of $27,750 versus $16,250 for females. The per capita income for the town was $12,208. About 24.2% of families and 27.6% of the population were below the poverty line, including 45.9% of those under the age of eighteen and 7.4% of those 65 or over.

== Education ==
The town is served by the Sanford-Fritch Independent School District.
