= Bula, Texas =

- Unincorporated community
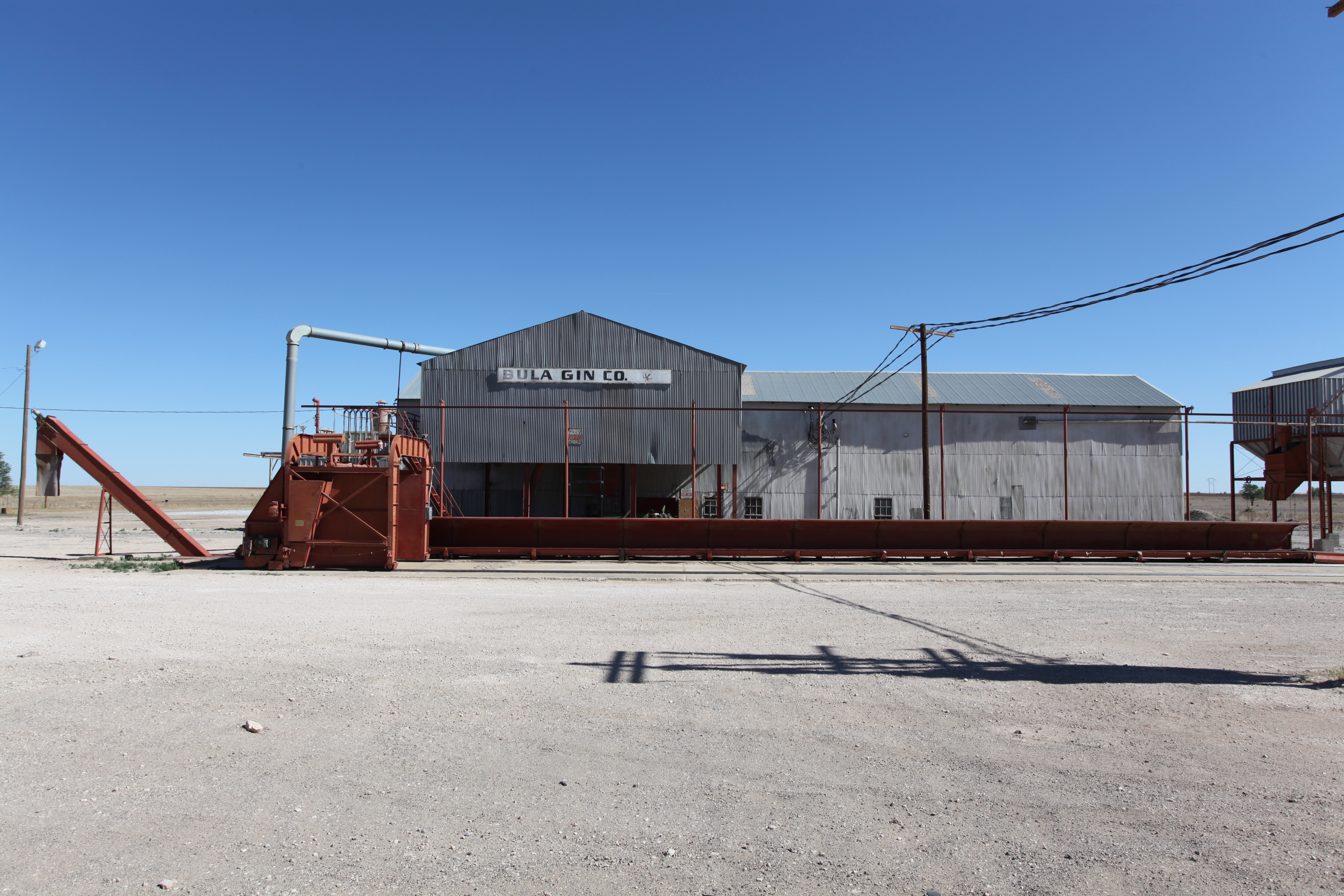
- Abandoned cotton gin in Bula

- Location within Texas Location within the United States
- Coordinates: 33°54′41″N 102°38′17″W
- Country: United States
- State: Texas
- County: Bailey
- Physiographic region: Llano Estacado
- Founded: 1924
- Elevation: 3,793 ft (1,156 m)
- Time zone: UTC-6 (Central (CST))
  - Summer (DST): UTC-5 (CDT)
- ZIP code: 79324
- Area code: 806

Bula (/ˈbjuːlə/ BEW-lə) is an unincorporated community in Bailey County, Texas, United States. According to the Handbook of Texas, the community had a population of 35 in 2000.

== History ==
The community of Bula was established in 1924 and was originally given the name Newsome for W.B. Newsome. He and his brother, Tom, sold their ranch and divided it into 177.7 acres (71.9 ha) of farms in 1924–25. Due to a conflict with another Texas post office with the same name, the name was changed to Bula in 1925. It was given this name in honor of either Bula Maude Oakes, who was a daughter of Methodist preacher Roma A. Oakes, or Bula Thorn, who was the wife of the community's first postmaster, William H. Thorn. Bula had a cotton gin in 1929 but never grew significantly. By 1980, the population had risen to only 105, then dropped to 35 in 2000.

Although it is unincorporated, Bula has a post office, with the ZIP code of 79324.

== Geography ==
Bula is located on the level plains of the Llano Estacado in the southeast corner of Bailey County, about 22 miles (35 km) southeast of the county seat of Muleshoe, and 7 miles (11 km) east of the Muleshoe National Wildlife Refuge. It is located on Farm to Market Roads 54 and 37, 17 mi (27 km) to the west of Littlefield, the county seat of Lamb County. It is also located 55 mi (89 km) northwest of Lubbock, 8 mi (13 km) south of Circle Back, and 13 mi (21 km) southeast of Needmore.

== Education ==
Bula had a school in 1925, which later moved and then closed in 1975. The school then burned sometime after. Today, the community is served by the Sudan Independent School District.

== See also ==
- Eastern New Mexico
- Llano Estacado
- Needmore
- Pep
- Texas Panhandle
- West Texas
