= Maple, Bailey County, Texas =

- Unincorporated community
- Location within Texas Location within the United States
- Coordinates: 33°50′55″N 102°53′55″W
- Country: United States
- State: Texas
- County: Bailey
- Elevation: 3,875 ft (1,181 m)
- Time zone: UTC-6 (Central (CST))
  - Summer (DST): UTC-5 (CDT)
- Area code: 806
- GNIS feature ID: 1362157

Maple is an unincorporated community in Bailey County, Texas, United States. According to the Handbook of Texas, the community had an estimated population of 75 in 2000.

== History ==
Named for early settler Maple Wilson, the community was established during the early 1920s. At that time, local ranches were subdivided into farms. A post office opened in 1926. By 1940, Maple had a population of around 600 with six businesses. Throughout the latter half of the 20th century, the community slowly declined. In 1980, around 130 people lived in Maple. That figure had fallen to 75 by 2000.

Maple has a post office with the zip code of 79344.

== Geography ==
Maple is located along FM 596 in southern Bailey County, about 35 miles (56 km) southwest of Muleshoe, 25 mi (40 km) south of Lariat, 9 mi (14 km) north of Virginia City, and 72 mi (116 km) northwest of Lubbock.

== Education ==
Since July 1, 2002, public education in the community of Maple has been provided by the Sudan Independent School District, which is based in the Lamb County city of Sudan. Prior to that day, the Maple-based Three Way Independent School District served the community and surrounding areas. The Three Way District began operations in 1945 after the Maple school district consolidated into it.
