= Goodland, Bailey County, Texas =

- Unincorporated community
- Location within Texas Location within the United States
- Coordinates: 33.8728695°N 102.9760520°W
- Country: United States
- State: Texas
- County: Bailey
- Elevation: 3,957 ft (1,206 m)
- Time zone: UTC-6 (Central (CST))
  - Summer (DST): UTC-5 (CDT)
- Area code: 806
- GNIS feature ID: 1379845

Goodland is an unincorporated community in Bailey County, in the U.S. state of Texas. According to the Handbook of Texas, the community had a population of 10 in 2000.

== Geography ==
Goodland is located on Farm-to-Market Road 54, 37 mi (60 km) southwest of Muleshoe, 13 mi (21 km) west of Enochs, 36 mi (58 km) west of Littlefield, and 74 mi (119 km) northwest of Lubbock just east of the New Mexico state line in southern Bailey County.

== Education ==
Goodland is served by the Sudan Independent School District.
