= Enochs, Texas =

- Unincorporated community
- Location within Texas Location within the United States
- Coordinates: 33°52′23″N 102°45′36″W
- Country: United States
- State: Texas
- County: Bailey
- Elevation: 3,790 ft (1,160 m)
- Time zone: UTC-6 (Central (CST))
  - Summer (DST): UTC-5 (CDT)
- Area code: 806
- GNIS feature ID: 1357053

Enochs is an unincorporated community in Bailey County, Texas, United States. According to the Handbook of Texas, the community had an estimated population of 80 in 2000. Enochs has a post office, with the ZIP code of 79324.

== History ==
Enochs developed as a trading center in the early 1920s. The population peaked at approximately 250 in 1940 when five businesses were operating in the community. By 1980, the population had fallen to 164 and remained at that level in 1990. In 2000, Enochs was home to three businesses and 80 residents.

== Geography ==
Enochs is situated at the junction of State Highway 214 and FM 54 in southern Bailey County, approximately three miles north of the Cochran County line and 12 miles south of Needmore. It is also located 25 mi (40 km) west of Littlefield and 63 mi (101 km) northwest of Lubbock.

=== Climate ===
According to the Köppen Climate Classification system, Enochs has a semi-arid climate, abbreviated "BSk" on climate maps.

== Education ==
Public education in the community of Enochs is provided by the Sudan Independent School District.
