= Needmore, Bailey County, Texas =

Needmore, Texas
- Unincorporated community
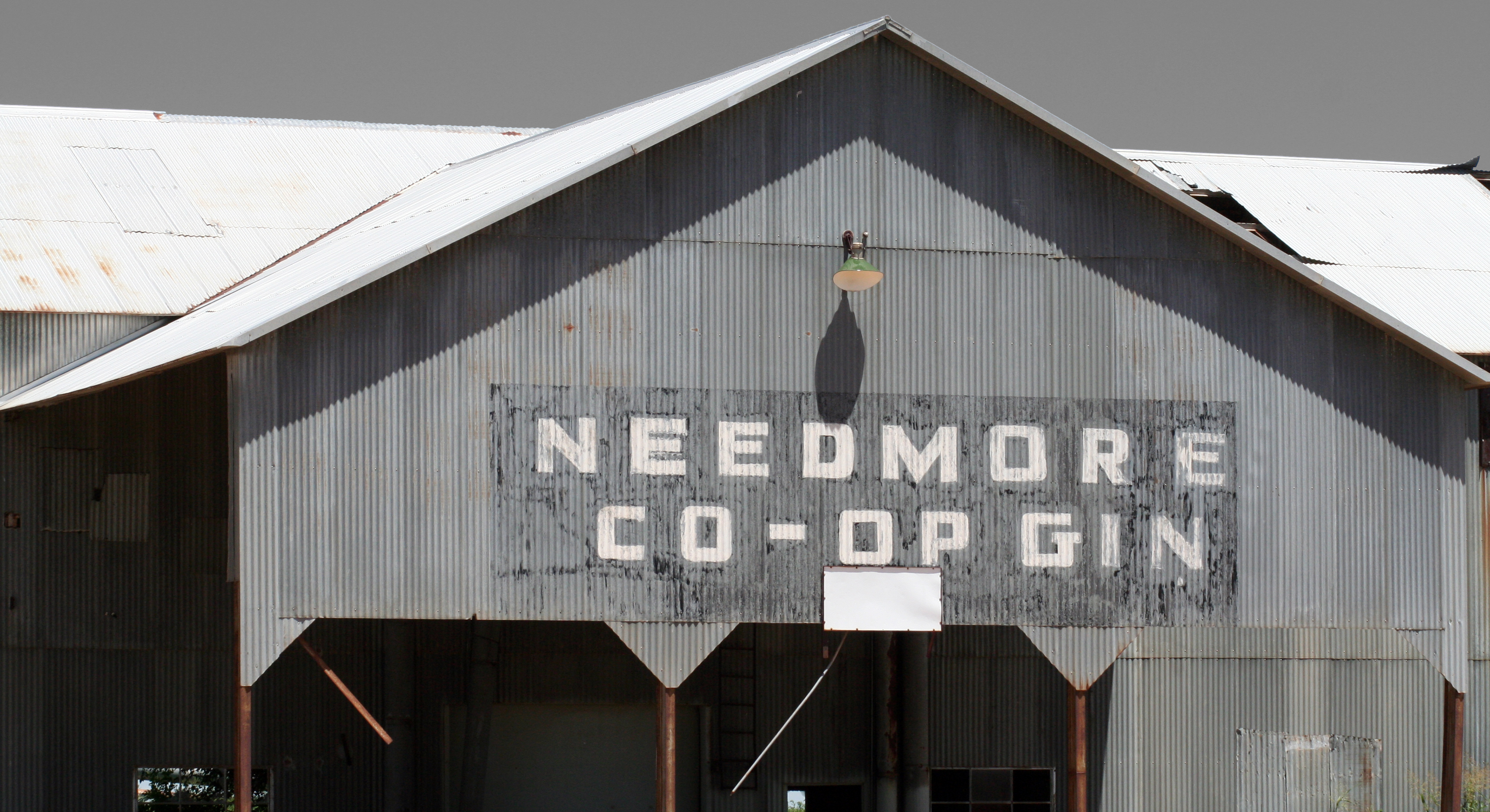
- Abandoned cotton gin in Needmore

- Location within Texas Location within the United States
- Coordinates: 34°01′59″N 102°44′15″W
- Country: United States
- State: Texas
- County: Bailey
- Physiographic region: Llano Estacado
- Founded: 1920s
- Elevation: 3,884 ft (1,184 m)

Population (2000)
  - Total: 45
- Time zone: UTC-6 (Central (CST))
  - Summer (DST): UTC-5 (CDT)
- ZIP code: 79347
- Area code: 806
- Website: Handbook of Texas

Needmore is an unincorporated community in Bailey County, Texas, United States.

== History ==
Needmore was so named because townsite promoters “needed more” settlers. Others contend that the town was named as an act of desperation to get the attention of more resource-rich cities in the region, including Notrees and Whiteface, to provide help in sustaining the town while in its infancy. After the town's founding in the 1920s, it never grew significantly, and by 1940, only 20 residents and two stores were at the site. By 1980, the population had reached 98, where it remained in 1990 and then dropped to 45 by 2000.

== Geography ==
Needmore is located slightly east of the center of the county, around 13 miles (21 km) south of Muleshoe, the county seat, and 6 miles (10 km) north of the Muleshoe National Wildlife Refuge. It is located at the intersection of Texas State Highway 214 and Farm to Market Road 298 between the small communities of Baileyboro to the west and Circle Back, 4 mi (6.4 km) to the east.

The terrain surrounding Needmore consists of level plains that at one time were covered with grassland vegetation. Today, except the Muleshoe National Wildlife Refuge, the shortgrass prairie has been replaced by plowed cropland, where cotton, sorghum, and winter wheat are grown. To the south and west of Needmore are numerous shallow lakes called “playas”. Most of these hold water for a short time after rain then dry and remain dry for extended periods. Some of the larger saline playas provide an important refuge for migratory waterfowl flying between Canada and Mexico, such as tens of thousands of sandhill cranes.

== Education ==
Needmore is served by the Muleshoe Independent School District and the Sudan Independent School District.
