= Lehman, Texas =

- Unincorporated community
- Location within Texas Location within the United States
- Coordinates: 33°37′18″N 102°47′55″W
- Country: United States
- State: Texas
- County: Cochran
- Elevation: 3,793 ft (1,156 m)
- Time zone: UTC-6 (Central (CST))
  - Summer (DST): UTC-5 (CDT)
- Area code: 806
- GNIS feature ID: 1380075

Lehman is an unincorporated community in Cochran County, Texas, United States. According to the Handbook of Texas, the community had a population of 8 in 2000.

== Geography ==
Lehman is located at the intersection of Farm to Market Road 769, Texas State Highway 125 and 214, 55 mi (89 km) west of Lubbock, 4 mi (6.4 km) south of Morton, 25 mi (40 km) west of Levelland, and 11 mi (18 km) west of Whiteface in central Cochran County.

== Education ==
Lehman had its own school in 1923. Today, the community is served by the Whiteface Independent School District.

== Media ==
KOBR has a KCBD-TV satellite in the community.
