= Famuliner, Texas =

- Unincorporated community
- Location within Texas Location within the United States
- Coordinates: 33°40′49″N 102°51′58″W
- Country: United States
- State: Texas
- County: Cochran
- Elevation: 3,813 ft (1,162 m)
- Time zone: UTC-6 (Central (CST))
  - Summer (DST): UTC-5 (CDT)
- Area code: 806
- GNIS feature ID: 1379752

Famuliner is an unincorporated community in Cochran County, Texas, United States. According to the Handbook of Texas, the community had a population of 5 in 2000.

== History ==
Famuliner was named for a local family of settlers. The community was founded in the 1940s and grew to have a gin and community center in 1965. In 1990, Famuliner was listed as a community but did not have a population recorded until 2000, when only five people reportedly lived in the area.

== Geography ==
Famuliner is located 8 mi (13 km) southeast of Morton in north-central Cochran County.

== Education ==
Today, the community is served by the Morton Independent School District.
