= Progress, Texas =

- Unincorporated community
- Location within Texas Location within the United States
- Coordinates: 34.2828547°N 102.8099409°W
- Country: United States
- State: Texas
- County: Bailey
- Elevation: 3,885 ft (1,184 m)
- Time zone: UTC-6 (Central (CST))
  - Summer (DST): UTC-5 (CDT)
- Area code: 806
- GNIS feature ID: 1365803

Progress is an unincorporated community in Bailey County, in the U.S. state of Texas. According to the Handbook of Texas, the community had a population of 49 in 2000.

== History ==
Progress was once a station on the Pecos and Northern Texas Railway. The community was founded in 1907 and the residents wanted the community to be a production center for fruits and vegetables, but the development did not occur. It had two stores and 100 residents in 1940, which went down to 49 in 1980 through 2000.

== Geography ==
Progress is located on U.S. Highway 84 and U.S. Highway 70 near the Parmer County line in far-northern Bailey County.

== Education ==
Progress is served by the Muleshoe Independent School District.
