= Texas State Highway 214 =

State highway in Texas

State Highway 214
- SH 214; mainline in red, business route in blue

Route information
- Maintained by TxDOT
- Length: 193.23 mi (310.97 km)
- Existed: 1935–present

Major junctions
- South end: US 62 / US 180 in Seminole
- US 82 / US 380 in Plains; US 70 / US 84 in Muleshoe; US 60 in Friona
- North end: I-40 near Adrian

Location
- Country: United States
- State: Texas

Highway system
- Highways in Texas; Interstate; US; State; Former; Toll; Loops; Spurs; FM/RM; Park; Rec
← I-214	→ SH 215

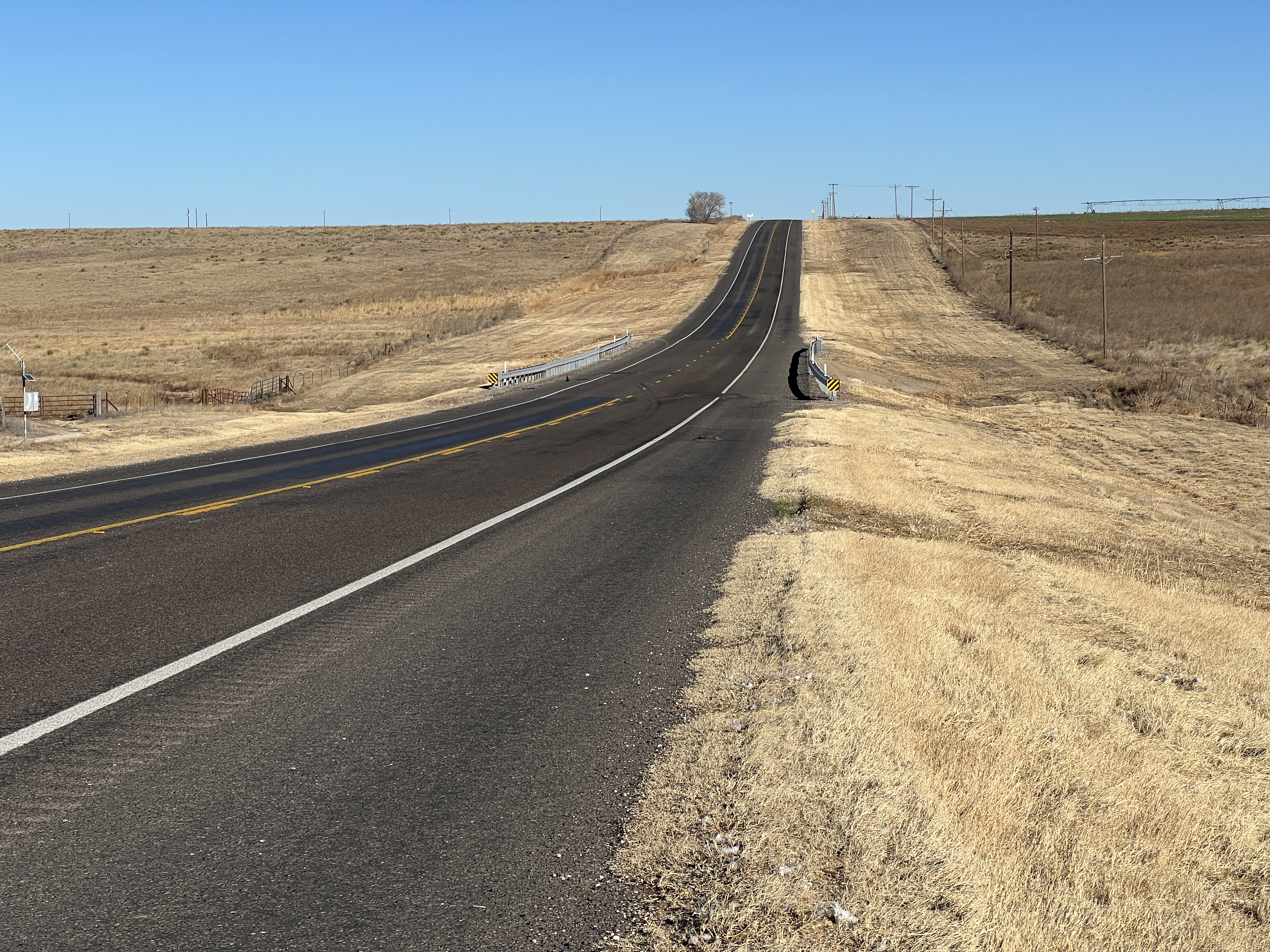
Texas State Highway 214 crossing Running Water Draw midway between Muleshoe and Friona, Texas

State Highway 214 (SH 214) is a Texas state highway that runs from Adrian to Seminole.

== History ==
The route was originally designated on January 18, 1935, from Muleshoe to the Bailey County line. On July 15, 1935, SH 214 was cancelled as it had not yet been built. SH 214 was restored on May 18, 1937, and extended south to Morton on May 24, 1938. SH 214 was extended to Plains on December 1, 1938. SH 214 was extended north to Friona on December 21, 1938. SH 214 was extended to Seminole on April 1, 1939. On March 27, 1940, The section from Friona south to Muleshoe was removed. On August 27, 1940, the section of SH 214 through Yoakum County was cancelled, creating a gap. On December 19, 1940, the section from Plains south to the Yoakum–Gaines county line was added back. On May 29, 1941, the section from the Yoakum–Cochran county line to Plains was added back. On December 13, 1956, an extension of SH 214 to Adrian along FM 299 to Friona, and FM 1412 and FM 290 to Adrian was signed, but not designated. On June 10, 1966, the extension to Friona was officially designated, replacing FM 299. On January 30, 1976, SH 214 was rerouted in Friona with the old route transferred to FM Spur 2397 and Spur 270 (now SH 214 Business). On August 29, 1990, the extension to Adrian was officially designated, replacing part of FM 1412 and all of FM 290.

== Major intersections ==
County	Location	mi	km	Destinations	Notes
Gaines	Seminole			US 62 / US 180 – Hobbs, Lamesa	Southern terminus
Gaines				SH 83 east / FM 2056 west – Seagraves	South end of SH 83 overlap
Yoakum	Denver City			SH 83 west – Lovington	North end of SH 83 overlap
Yoakum				FM 1939 east	
Yoakum				FM 213 east – Wellman	
Yoakum	Plains			US 82 / US 380 – Lovington, Roswell, Brownfield	
Yoakum				FM 2196 east	
Cochran				FM 1585	
Cochran				FM 1894 west	
Cochran				SH 125 – Bledsoe, Whiteface	
Cochran				FM 1169 west	
Cochran	Morton			SH 114 – Dora, Levelland	
Cochran	Morton			FM 1780 south – Whiteface	
Cochran				FM 597 east	
Cochran				FM 3305 east	
Bailey	Enochs			FM 54 – Littlefield	
Bailey				FM 37 east – Amherst	
Bailey	Needmore			FM 298 – Sudan	
Bailey				FM 746 east	South end of FM 746 overlap
Bailey				FM 746 west	North end of FM 746 overlap
Bailey	Muleshoe			US 70 west / US 84 – Farwell, Littlefield	South end of US 70 overlap
Bailey	Muleshoe			US 70 east – Plainview	North end of US 70 overlap
Parmer				FM 145 – Farwell, Lazbuddie	
Parmer				SH 86 – Bovina, Dimmitt	
Parmer				FM 2397	Interchange
Parmer	Friona			Bus. SH 214	
Parmer	Friona	Gap in route			
Parmer	Friona			US 60 – Farwell, Hereford	
Parmer				FM 2298 north	
Deaf Smith				FM 1058 – Hereford	
Deaf Smith				FM 1412 east	
Deaf Smith				FM 2587 east	
Oldham	Adrian			I-40 – Tucumcari, Amarillo	I-40 exit 23; northern terminus.
1.000 mi = 1.609 km; 1.000 km = 0.621 mi: Concurrency terminus
