= Virginia City (disambiguation) =

Virginia City is a city located in Storey County, Nevada.

Virginia City may also refer to:

- Virginia City, Montana
- Virginia City, Texas
- Virginia City (film), a 1940 film starring Errol Flynn
- Virginia City Hybrid Energy Center, a power plant in St. Paul, Virginia
