= Lincoln Riley =

American football coach (born 1983)

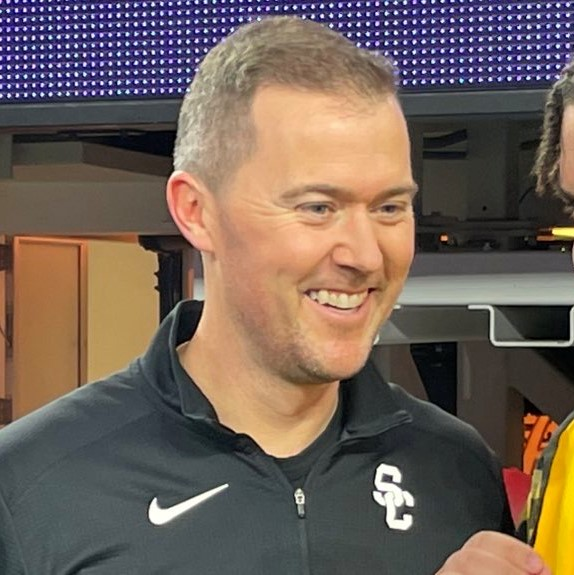
- Riley in 2023

Current position
- Title: Head coach
- Team: University of Southern California
- Conference: Big Ten
- Record: 43–21

Biographical details
- Born: September 5, 1983 (age 43); Muleshoe, Texas, U.S.

Playing career
- 2002: Texas Tech
- Position: Quarterback

Coaching career (HC unless noted)
- 2003–2005: Texas Tech (SA)
- 2006: Texas Tech (GA)
- 2007: Texas Tech (WR)
- 2008–2009: Texas Tech (IWR)
- 2010–2013: East Carolina (OC/QB)
- 2014: East Carolina (AHC/OC/QB)
- 2015–2016: Oklahoma (OC/QB)
- 2017–2021: Oklahoma
- 2022–present: USC

Head coaching record
- Overall: 98–31
- Bowls: 3–5
- Tournaments: 0–3 (CFP)

Accomplishments and honors

Championships
- 4 Big 12 (2017–2020)

Awards
- Broyles Award (2015); Big 12 Coach of the Year (2018); AP Big 12 Coach of the Year (2018)

Lincoln Michael Riley (born September 5, 1983) is an American college football coach and former player who is the head football coach at the University of Southern California. Riley previously served as the head coach at the University of Oklahoma for five seasons from 2017 to 2021, where he won four consecutive Big 12 Championship Games.

Playing quarterback himself as a walk-on player at Texas Tech and known for his "Air Raid" offensive scheme, Riley has mentored three Heisman Trophy winners at quarterback (Baker Mayfield, Kyler Murray, and Caleb Williams) as well as another starting NFL quarterback and Super Bowl MVP in Jalen Hurts.

== Early life ==
Riley ran track at Muleshoe High School in Muleshoe, a small town of roughly 5,000 in West Texas. He began his high school football career at defensive end and made the move to quarterback for his junior and senior seasons. Riley played quarterback at Texas Tech University as a walk-on in 2002, behind senior starter and future Texas Tech coach Kliff Kingsbury and back-up B. J. Symons.

== Coaching career ==
=== Early career ===
In 2003, Riley became a student assistant to Mike Leach, gradually progressing to graduate assistant and then to receivers coach.

=== East Carolina ===
Riley went on to serve five seasons as offensive coordinator at East Carolina University under head coach Ruffin McNeill. In his first season, Riley coached Dominique Davis, who set a school record for touchdown passes and was named Conference USA Newcomer of the Year. Davis was succeeded by Shane Carden, who set multiple program records and was named Conference USA MVP in 2013 and American Athletic Conference Offensive Player of the Year in 2014. Wide receiver Justin Hardy was invited to East Carolina as a walk-on by Riley in 2010 and finished his career as the FBS all-time leader in career receptions with 387.

=== Oklahoma ===
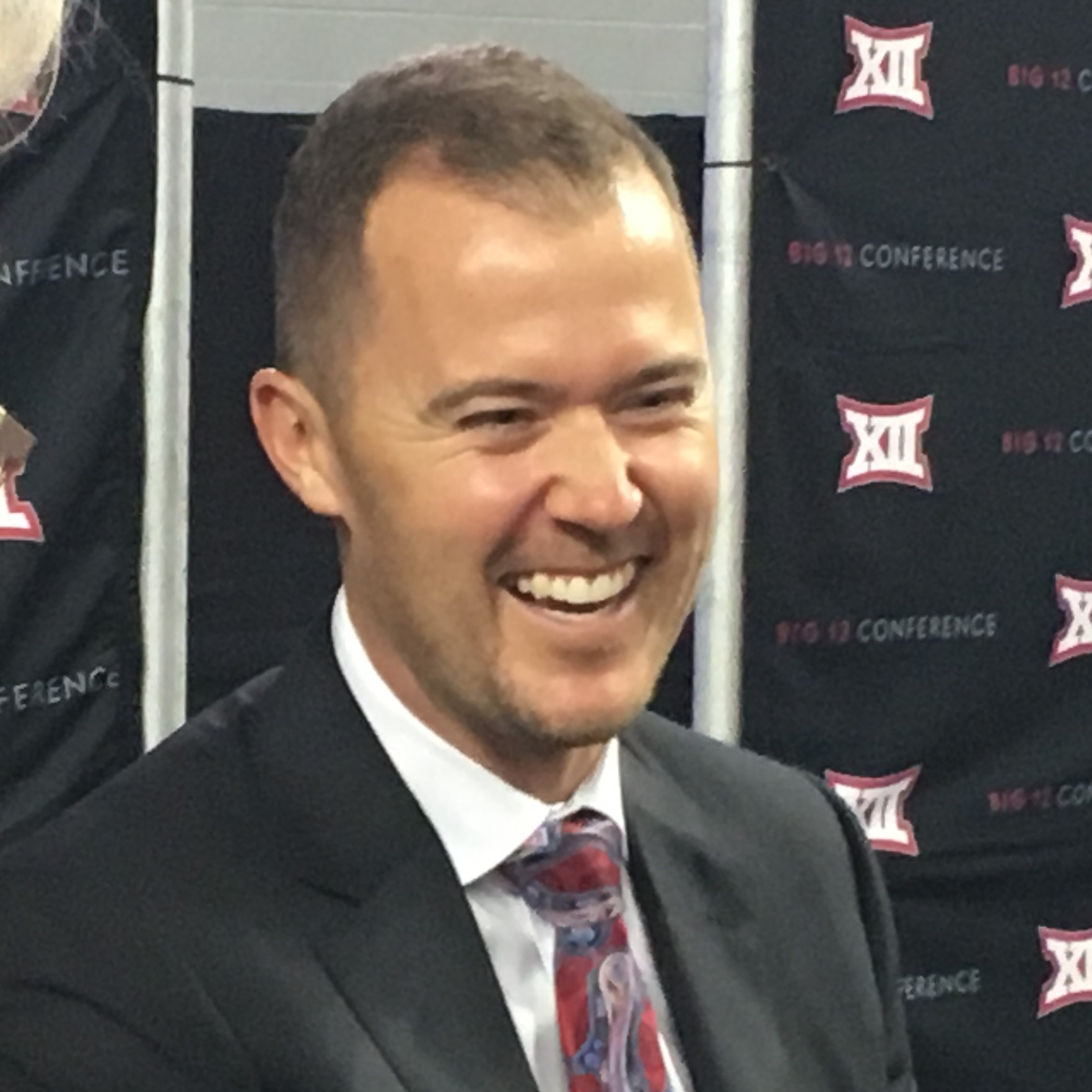
Riley at 2018 Big 12 Media Days

Riley was hired by Bob Stoops to be the offensive coordinator for the Oklahoma Sooners on January 12, 2015. In his first season at Oklahoma, Riley led the Sooners to the 7th ranked offense in the country while Bob Stoops led the Sooners to the College Football Playoff. He also won the Broyles Award, awarded the nation's top assistant coach. On June 7, 2017, Bob Stoops retired as head coach and Riley was named his successor. In the 2017 season, Riley, anchored by Heisman winner Baker Mayfield, led his team to the Big 12 conference championship, a No. 2 ranking in the College Football Playoff ranking, and a berth in one of the CFP semifinal games at the Rose Bowl. Oklahoma went on to lose the 2018 Rose Bowl to Georgia, in double overtime, 54–48. It was the first of three consecutive 12–2 seasons for the Sooners under Riley. Moreover, OU won the 2017, 2018, 2019, and 2020 Big 12 Championship Games during Riley's tenure there. As of the day he had left, Oklahoma (and Riley) had won all four of the revived Big XII Championship Games since the conference resumed them. However, the Sooners had already been eliminated from contention for the Big XII Championship Game for the 2021 season and would soon to move to a new conference.

Riley finished his tenure at Oklahoma with a 55–10 record and the highest winning percentage in the history of coaches at the OU program. In his relatively brief time there, he mentored two quarterbacks who won the Heisman Trophy: Baker Mayfield and Kyler Murray in consecutive seasons - both quarterbacks who were transfers and had already progressed under other staffs. Another who did not win the trophy, Jalen Hurts, went on to an NFL career as a starting pro quarterback for the Philadelphia Eagles.

Fox Sports Radio and other sources reported that Riley was unhappy with Oklahoma's decision to move to the Southeastern Conference (SEC) from their traditional home in the Big 12 Conference. OU's Athletic Director Joe Castiglione countered that Riley had been "on board" with Oklahoma's shift to the SEC.

=== USC ===
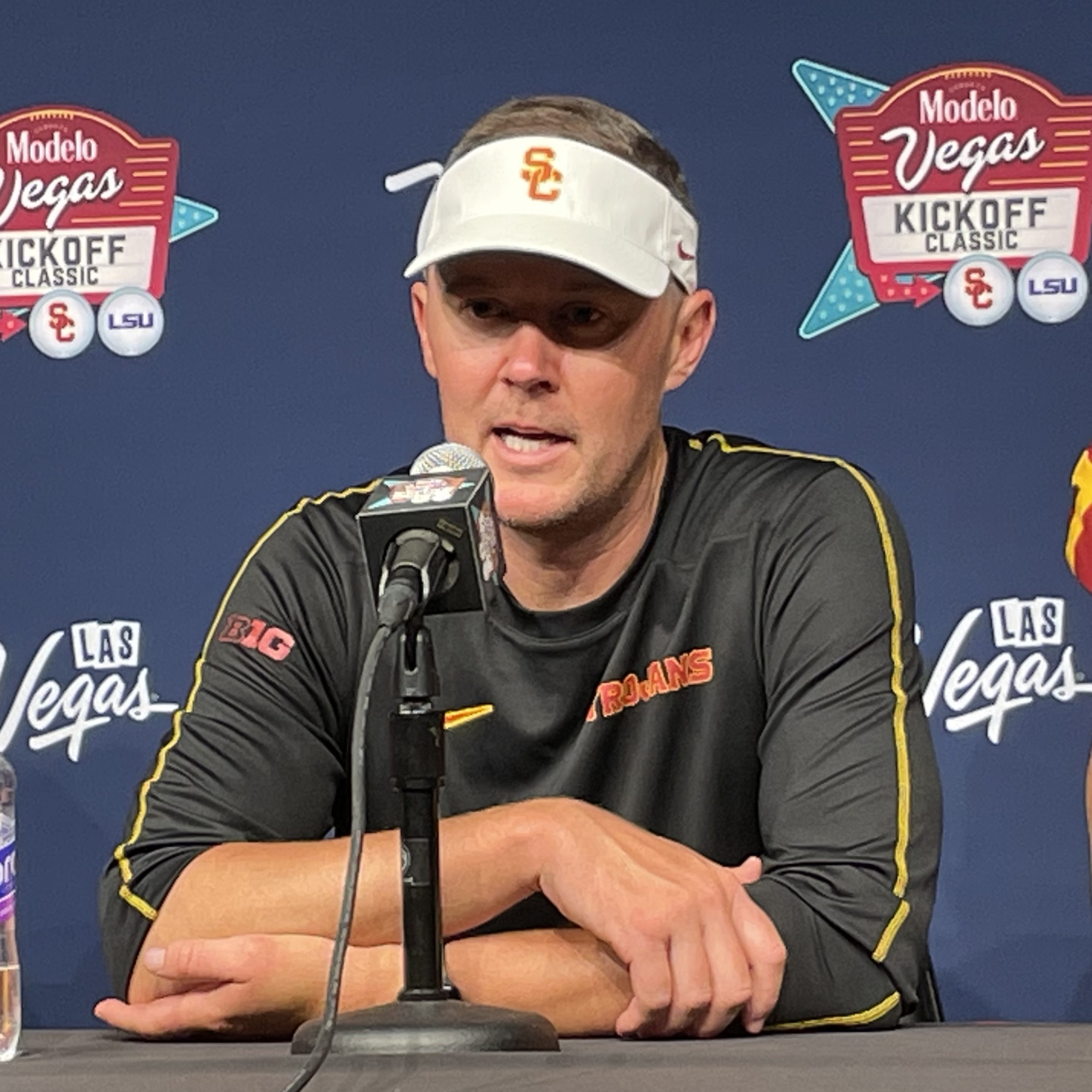
Riley after the 2024 Vegas Kickoff Classic

On November 28, 2021, Riley was named the 30th head coach of the USC Trojans football program representing the University of Southern California, replacing Clay Helton. The move was widely praised in Los Angeles area media, with the Los Angeles Daily News calling it a walk-off home run hire for the Trojans after Riley's "brilliant" five years at Oklahoma, predicting that Riley would revive and transform not only USC football, but also Pac-12 football in general and all of "football in the western third of the country." The Los Angeles Times pointed out that Riley "still has an itch to scratch when it comes to winning at the highest level of the sport" and must feel he can "reach the summit more easily from USC." Riley himself cited, in an interview given to SportsCenter two days later, the "history and tradition of one of the greatest college football programs of all time, the city, the Mecca of sports right here in Los Angeles" were what had lured him over to USC. Riley stated it was "tough" to leave Oklahoma but he "knew it was the right thing."

Lincoln Riley and the USC Trojans started the season off hot going 6–0 but fell to the #20 Utes 43–42 on October 15, 2022. The Trojans won the rest of their regular season games, finishing the season ranked #4. In the Pac-12 Championship Game they lost to the Utes again, 47–24, and were knocked out of contention for the College Football Playoff. USC faced the Tulane Green Wave in the Cotton Bowl, losing in the last few seconds, 46–45. USC's win probability stood at 99.8% after holding a 15-point lead with 4:30 remaining in the game.

== Personal life ==
Riley graduated from Texas Tech in 2006 with a bachelor's degree in exercise and sports science. He has a wife and two daughters. His younger brother, Garrett Riley, previously served as the offensive coordinator at Clemson University and before that as running backs coach for Appalachian State.

== Head coaching record ==
Year	Team	Overall	Conference	Standing	Bowl/playoffs	Coaches^{#}	AP^{°}
Oklahoma Sooners (Big 12 Conference) (2017–2021)
2017	Oklahoma	12–2	8–1	1st	L Rose^{†}	3	3
2018	Oklahoma	12–2	8–1	1st	L Orange^{†}	4	4
2019	Oklahoma	12–2	8–1	1st	L Peach^{†}	6	7
2020	Oklahoma	9–2	6–2	2nd	W Cotton^{†}	6	6
2021	Oklahoma	10–2	7–2	3rd	Alamo (Note: Riley departed for USC prior to the bowl game.)	13	14
Oklahoma:		55–10	37–7				
USC Trojans (Pac-12 Conference) (2022–2023)
2022	USC	11–3	8–1	1st	L Cotton^{†}	13	12
2023	USC	8–5	5–4	T–4th	W Holiday		
USC Trojans (Big Ten Conference) (2024–present)
2024	USC	7–6	4–5	T–9th	W Las Vegas		
2025	USC	9–4	7–2	T–4th	L Alamo	21	20
2026	USC	8–3	5–3				
USC:		43–21	29–15				
Total:		98–31					
National championship Conference title Conference division title or championship game berth
^{†}Indicates CFP / New Years' Six bowl.; ^{#}Rankings from final Coaches Poll.; ^{°}Rankings from final AP Poll.
