= Three Way Independent School District (Bailey County, Texas) =

Former school district in Texas, United States

Three Way Independent School District was a school district headquartered in Maple, in unincorporated Bailey County, Texas; it extended into Cochran County.

The district area was 308 square miles (800 km^{2}).

== History ==
The Three Way Independent School District was formed in May 1945 by the consolidation of Goodland Consolidated Independent School District No. 7, Watson Independent School District No. 10, and Wilson Independent County Line School District No. 14. Three Way School was built on a 20-acre (81,000 m^{2}) parcel of land north of Maple. Over the years, several smaller districts - including Stegall (1946) and Bula (1975) – consolidated with Three Way. By the 1994–1995 school year, the district enrolled 127 students. That figure had fallen to 83 by 2001. Faced with declining enrollment and lower funding from the state, Three Way administrators decided that the district would have to consolidate with another larger school district by the start of the next school year. Three neighboring districts – Morton, Muleshoe, and Sudan – were considered for consolidation. A questionnaire was sent to Three Way ISD parents and registered voters to see which of the candidate districts was most favored. Sudan ISD was selected by 57% of Three Way voters and 59% of Three Way parents. Both school boards approved the decision and the issue was put to a vote on February 2, 2002. In the election, Sudan ISD voters supported consolidation by a 190-1 margin. Of the 80 votes cast by Three Way ISD residents, 54 supported the measure with 26 opposed. The merger of Three Way ISD with Sudan became official on July 1, 2002.

== Note ==
- An amount of content originates from the article Maple, Bailey County, Texas
