= Circle Back, Texas =

- Unincorporated community
- Location within Texas Location within the United States
- Coordinates: 34°01′56″N 102°39′52″W
- Country: United States
- State: Texas
- County: Bailey
- Physiographic region: Llano Estacado
- Elevation: 3,881 ft (1,183 m)

Population (2000)
  - Total: 10
- Time zone: UTC-6 (Central (CST))
  - Summer (DST): UTC-5 (CDT)
- ZIP code: 79347
- Area code: 806
- GNIS feature ID: 2034717

Circle Back, also Circleback, is an unincorporated community in Bailey County, Texas, United States. According to the Handbook of Texas, the community had a population of 10 in 2000.

== History ==
The community was named after the circle-shaped brand used by a cattle ranch to the south. At one time, Circle Back had around a dozen houses, a filling station, and a combination store/post office. The community had four different postmasters: Gordon A. Sharman on February 25, 1931, Leaburn H. Harper on January 18, 1944, Bulah L. Harper on September 19, 1951, and Nella Boyce on August 26, 1953. The post office shut down that next year and got its mail from nearby Sudan. The community had around 100 residents in 1949 and served cattle and sheep ranches. Raymond and Elizabeth Gage were members of a local Independent Order of Odd Fellows from the late 1940s to the 1960s. Local store owner Sarah "Zue" Smart managed it until it burned around 1965. The population plunged to 49 in 1980 and the only residents left were the pastor of the local Baptist church, his wife, and their two children by the middle of the decade. Its population was 10 from 1990 through 2000 but was reduced by two in 2014.

== Geography ==
Circle Back is located at the intersection of Farm to Market Roads 298 and 3397, 66 mi (106 km) northwest of Lubbock and some 4 mi (6.4 km) away from Needmore in eastern Bailey County.

== Education ==
Circle Back had a school that hosted six grade levels from 1918 to 1956. The Circle Back school district then joined with the Sudan Independent School District in 1957, after the division of Lamb and Bailey counties. The community continues to be served by the Sudan ISD today.
