= Garrett Riley =

American football coach (born 1989)

Current position
- Title: Quarterbacks coach
- Team: Missouri
- Conference: SEC

Biographical details
- Born: September 11, 1989 (age 37); Muleshoe, Texas, U.S.
- Education: Texas Tech (2012)

Playing career
- 2008–2009: Texas Tech
- 2010: Stephen F. Austin
- Position: Quarterback

Coaching career (HC unless noted)
- 2011: Roosevelt HS (TX) (QB)
- 2012: Augustana (IL) (RB)
- 2013–2014: East Carolina (GA)
- 2015: East Carolina (OWR)
- 2016: Kansas (OA)
- 2017: Kansas (QB)
- 2018: Kansas (TE/FB)
- 2019: Appalachian State (RB)
- 2020–2021: SMU (OC/QB)
- 2022: TCU (OC/QB)
- 2023–2025: Clemson (OC/QB)
- 2026–present: Missouri (QB)

Accomplishments and honors

Awards
- Broyles Award (2022)

Garrett Travis Riley (born September 11, 1989) is an American football coach who is the quarterback coach at Missouri. He was previously the offensive coordinator at Clemson, TCU, and SMU.

== Coaching career ==
A native of Muleshoe, Texas, Riley began his coaching career at Roosevelt High School in Lubbock, Texas as the team's quarterbacks coach and passing game assistant. Upon the completion of his degree in 2012, he was named the running backs coach at Augustana College in Illinois. He joined the coaching staff at East Carolina in 2013 as a graduate assistant and was later promoted to outside wide receivers coach in 2015.

=== Kansas ===
Riley joined the Kansas staff in 2016 as an offensive analyst before being promoted to quarterbacks coach before the 2017 season. He was shifted to coaching the tight ends and fullbacks for the 2018 season.

=== Appalachian State ===
Riley was hired as the running backs coach at Appalachian State in 2019. Initially set to be promoted to offensive coordinator, Riley left to take the offensive coordinator job at SMU.

=== SMU ===
Riley was named the offensive coordinator and quarterbacks coach at SMU in 2020.

The SMU offense ranked in the top 15 in both scoring and total offense both years with Riley as the playcaller.

=== TCU ===
Riley was named the offensive coordinator at TCU in December 2021. TCU had the 9th highest scoring offense in the 2022 season with 38.8 pts/game. He was awarded the 2022 Broyles Award for the top assistant coach in college football.

=== Clemson ===
Riley left TCU to take the offensive coordinator position at Clemson on January 12, 2023, replacing Brandon Streeter.

=== Missouri ===
On January 9, 2026, Riley was hired by Missouri to become an offensive assistant.

== Personal life ==
He is the younger brother of USC head coach Lincoln Riley.
