= Morton High School (Texas) =

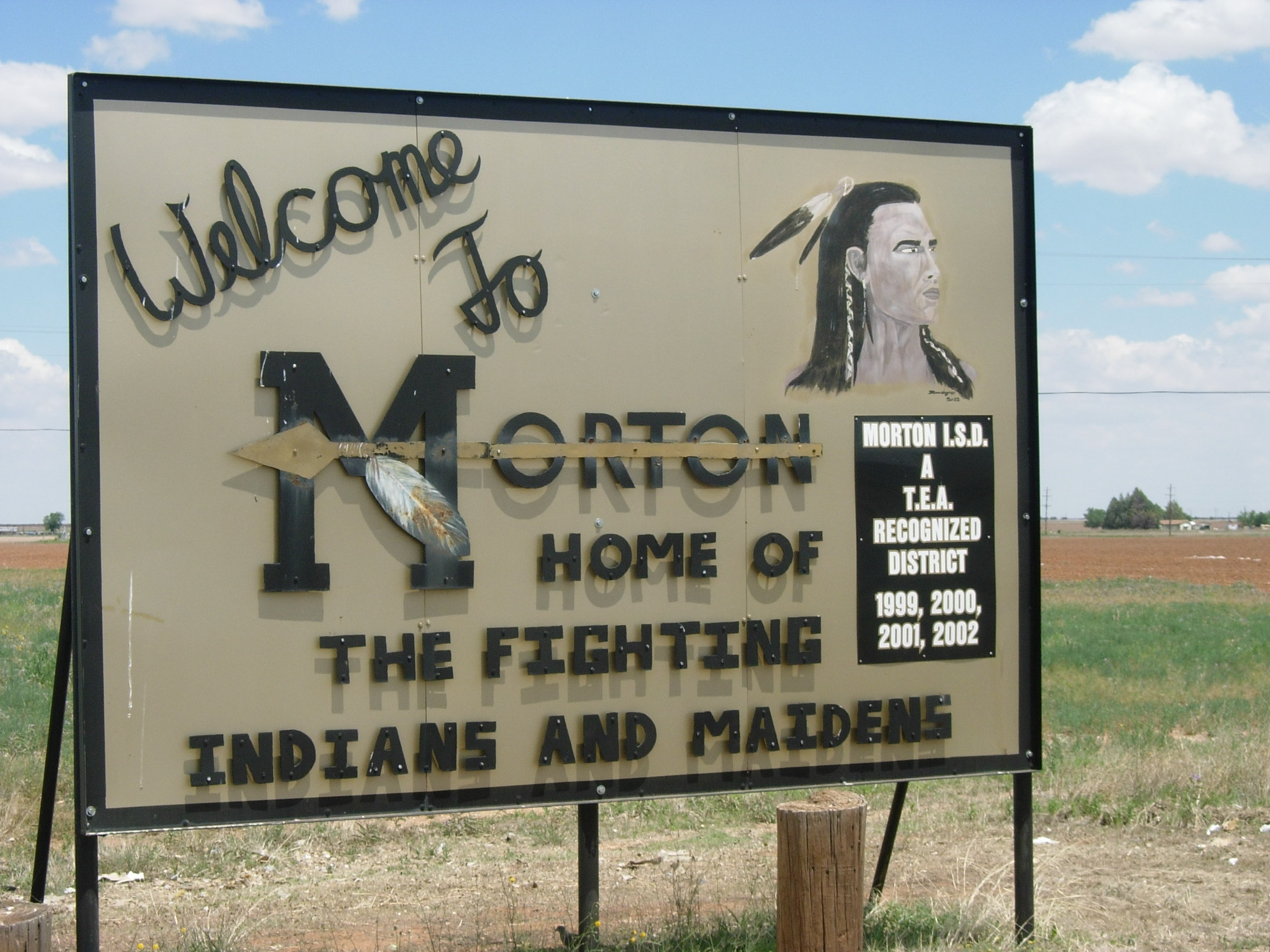

Location
- 500 Champion Drive; Morton, Texas 79346; United States; 33.721482°N 102.764216°W

Information
- School type: Public high school
- School district: Morton Independent School District
- Principal: John Albin
- Staff: 36.20 (FTE)
- Grades: PK-12
- Enrollment: 354 (2023–2024)
- Student to teacher ratio: 9.78
- Colors: Black & Gold
- Athletics conference: UIL Class A
- Mascot: Indian/Maiden
- Newspaper: The Native Times
- Website: Morton High School

Morton High School is a public high school located in Morton, Texas United States. It is part of the Morton Independent School District, which is located in central Cochran County, and is classified as a 1A school by the UIL.

== History ==
In 2015, the school was rated "Met Standard" by the Texas Education Agency.

For the 2021–2022 school year, the school was given a "B" by the Texas Education Agency.

== Athletics ==
The Morton Indians compete in the following sports

- Baseball
- Basketball
- Cross Country
- Football
- Golf
- Tennis
- Track and Field

=== State Titles ===
- Boys Basketball
  - 1972(2A), 1977(2A), 1983(2A), 1986(2A), 1987(2A), 2005(1A/D1)
- Girls Basketball
  - 1987(2A)

Boys Year	Class	Winner Score	Runner up Score
1972	2A	Morton 62	Whitehouse 59
1976	2A	Mart 57	Morton 52
1977	2A	Morton 63	Kountze 60
1983	2A	Morton 91	Bartlett 69
1985	2A	Grapeland 63	Morton 56
1986	2A	Morton 73	Dripping Springs 59
1987	2A	Morton 84	Liberty Hill 72
2004	1A	Normangee 53	Morton 51 OT
2005	1A	Morton 66	Snook 38
Tx Cup	Class	Winner Score	Runner up Score
2005	1A	Morton 69	Lipan 53
Girls Year	Class	Winner Score	Runner up Score
1952	1A	Hamilton 27	Morton 19
1987	2A	Morton 68	Paris 53

- In 1987, both the boys and girls won state championships in basketball !!!

== Notable alumni ==
- Christopher Hester, Class of 1991, President and Founder of Kinnser Software. Ernst and Young Entrepreneur of the Year Award winner, 2016.
