= Griffith, Cochran County, Texas =

- Unincorporated community
- Location within Texas Location within the United States
- Coordinates: 33°45′29″N 103°1′11″W
- Country: United States
- State: Texas
- County: Cochran
- Elevation: 3,944 ft (1,202 m)
- Time zone: UTC-6 (Central (CST))
  - Summer (DST): UTC-5 (CDT)
- Area code: 806
- GNIS feature ID: 1379863

Griffith is an unincorporated community in Cochran County, Texas, United States. According to the Handbook of Texas, the community had a population of 12 in 2000.

== Geography ==
Griffith is located on Texas State Highway 114, 70 mi (110 km) west of Lubbock and 2 mi (3.2 km) east of the New Mexico state line in northwestern Cochran County.

== Education ==
Today, the community is served by the Morton Independent School District.
