= Sudan High School =

Location
- P.O. Box 659; Sudan, Texas 79371; United States
- Coordinates: 34.0630°N 102.5295°W

Information
- School type: Public high school
- School district: Sudan Independent School District
- Principal: Gordon Martin
- Teaching staff: 21.35 (FTE)
- Grades: 8-12
- Enrollment: 180 (2024-2025)
- Student to teacher ratio: 8.43
- Colors: Black and gold
- Athletics conference: UIL Class AA
- Mascot: Hornet/Hornette
- Website: Sudan High School

Sudan High School is a public high school located in the city of Sudan, Texas, USA and classified as a 2A school by the UIL. It is a part of the Sudan Independent School District located in southeastern Lamb County. In 2014, Sudan High School was designated as a U.S. Department of Education National Blue Ribbon School. In 2015, the school was rated "Met Standard" by the Texas Education Agency.

== Athletics ==
The Sudan Hornets compete in these sports -

Cross Country, Football, Basketball, Powerlifting, Golf, Tennis & Track

=== State Titles ===
- Boys Basketball -
  - 1995(1A)
- Girls Basketball -
  - 1983(1A), 1987(1A), 1994(1A), 2009(1A/D1), 2012(1A/D1)
- Football -
  - 1993(1A)
- Boys Track -
  - 1994(1A)

== Band ==
- Marching Band State Champions
  - 1990(1A)
- Marching Band Sweepstakes State Champions
  - 1992(1A)
