= National Mule Memorial =

Coordinates: 34°13′34″N 102°43′23″W

The National Mule Memorial is an unstaffed outdoor sculptural installation located in Muleshoe, Texas. Built by the National Mule Memorial Association in 1965, the Memorial is embellished with an official Texas historical marker calling attention to the role of mules in Texas's history and development.

== Description ==
Until the mid-20th century, the mule was a common sight on American farms. A sterile hybrid of horse and donkey, the mule was credited by owners with highly productive work habits as a draft animal in challenging conditions, especially those associated with plowing furrows in sticky clay soil. The application of the internal combustion engine to farm machinery, starting in the early 1900s, led to the end of use for the mule. Unlike domesticated animals that are fertile, the mule cannot parent its own kind and could not transition from draft animal to rural pet animal. In the mid-1900s, the headcount of mules in the U.S. central states was dropping towards zero.

Jackass admirer V. H. Torrance of Austin, Texas lamented the disappearance of the mule from the American scene, and published a call for the vanishing animal to be memorialized. The plea was widely reproduced and found readers throughout Texas. Gil Lamb, owner of radio station KMUL in Farwell, Texas, took up the campaign and added to it a demand that the memorial be placed in Muleshoe.

The memorial was dedicated in July 1965. It centers on a representation of Old Pete, who at the time of his reproduction in sculpture was an 18-year-old, 1,100-pound live mule in Muleshoe. Old Pete was rendered in fiberglass by sculptor Kevin Wolff. The statue was invited to and attended the first inaugural of President George W. Bush.

The memorial is located adjacent to the Muleshoe Chamber of Commerce on the north side of the Texas Panhandle rural town. The installation is located on U.S. Highway 84.
