= List of Oklahoma Sooners head football coaches =

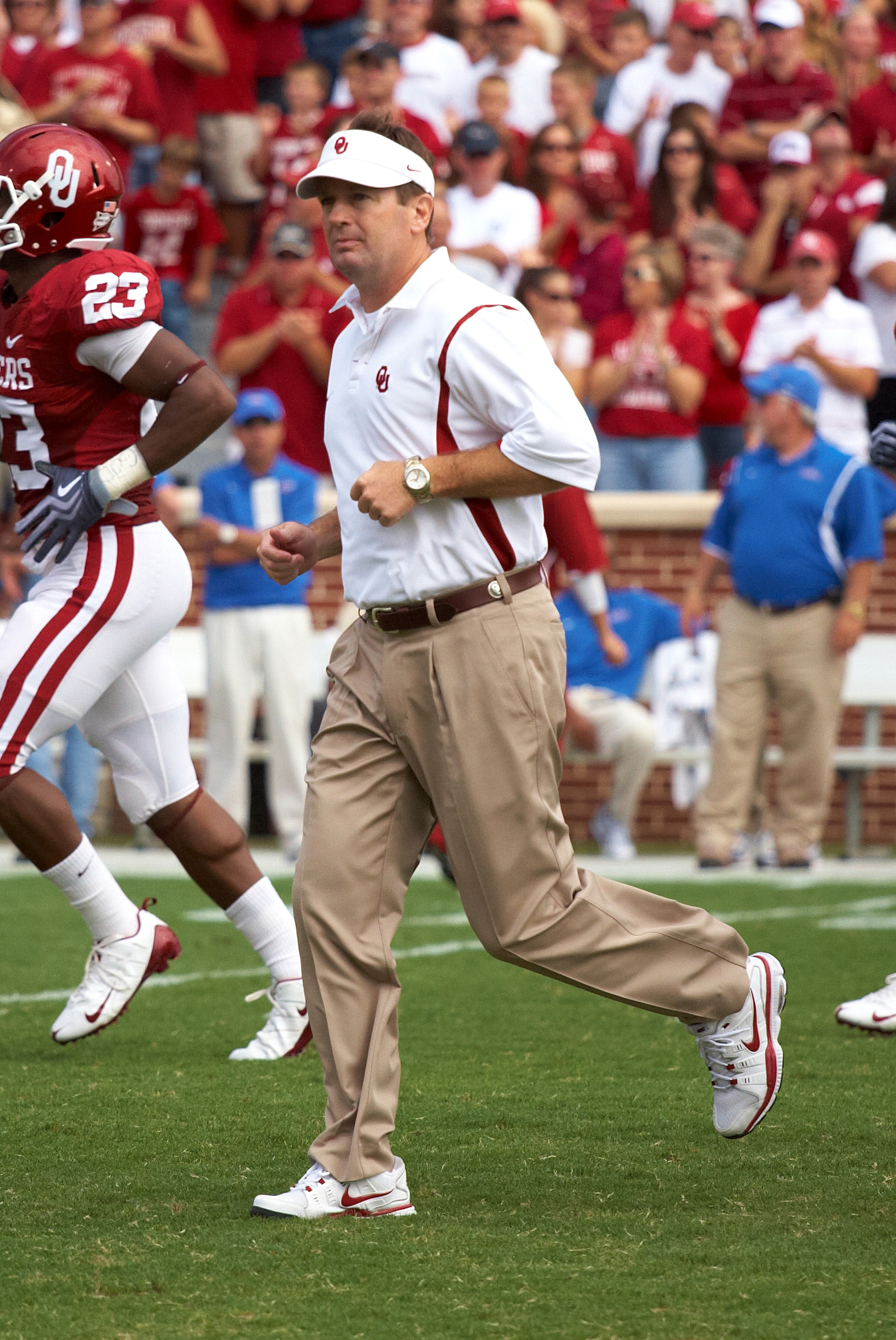
Bob Stoops, head coach of the Oklahoma Sooners from 1999 to 2016 and interim head coach in 2021.

The Oklahoma Sooners football program is a college football team that represents the University of Oklahoma. The team has had 23 head coaches since organized football began in 1895. The Sooners have played in more than 1,300 games in its 131 seasons. In those seasons, 10 coaches have led the Sooners to postseason bowl games: Thomas E. Stidham, Jim Tatum, Bud Wilkinson, Gomer Jones, Chuck Fairbanks, Barry Switzer, Gary Gibbs, Bob Stoops, Lincoln Riley, and Brent Venables. Nine coaches have won conference championships with the Sooners: Bennie Owen, Stidham, Dewey Luster, Tatum, Wilkinson, Fairbanks, Switzer, Stoops and Riley. Wilkinson, Switzer, and Stoops have also won national championships with the Sooners. Stoops is the all-time leader in games coached and won, Owen is the all-time leader in years coached, while Riley is the all-time leader in winning percentage. John Harts is, in terms of winning percentage, the worst coach the Sooners have had as he lost the only game he coached. John Blake has the lowest winning percentage of those who have coached more than one game with .353 in his 34 games.

Of the 23 Sooner coaches, Owen, Lawrence Jones, Tatum, Wilkinson, Switzer, and Stoops have been inducted into the College Football Hall of Fame. Wilkinson, Switzer, and Stoops have each received National Coach of the Year honors from at least one organization. The current head coach is Brent Venables, who was hired on December 5, 2021, replacing Riley after his departure to become the head coach at the University of Southern California (USC) in November 2021.

== Key ==
General
#	Number of coaches (Note: A running total of the number of coaches of the Sooners. Thus, any coach who has two or more separate terms as head coach is counted only once.)
CCs	Conference championships (Note: Oklahoma did not join a conference until 1915.)
NCs	National championships
†	Elected to the College Football Hall of Fame

Overall games
GC	Games coached
OW	Wins
OL	Losses
OT	Ties (Note: Overtime rules in college football were introduced in 1996, making ties impossible in the period since.)
O%	Winning percentage (Note: When computing the win–loss percentage, a tie counts as half a win and half a loss.)

Conference games
CW	Wins
CL	Losses
CT	Ties
C%	Winning percentage

Postseason games
PW	Wins
PL	Losses
PT	Ties

== Head coaches ==
Statistics correct as of the end of the 2024 NCAA Division I FBS football season

#	Name	Term	Season(s)	GC	OW	OL	OT	O%	CW	CL	CT	C%	PW	PL	PT	CCs	NCs	National awards
1	John A. Harts	1895	1	0	1	0	.000	—	—	—	—	—	—	—	—	—	—	
2	Vernon Parrington	1897–1900	4	12	9	2	1	.792	—	—	—	—	—	—	—	—	—	—
3	Fred Roberts	1901	1	5	3	2	0	.600	—	—	—	—	—	—	—	—	—	—
4	Mark McMahon	1902–1903	2	21	11	7	3	.595	—	—	—	—	—	—	—	—	—	—
5	Fred Ewing	1904	1	8	4	3	1	.593	—	—	—	—	—	—	—	—	—	—
6	Bennie Owen†	1905–1926	22	192	122	54	16	.677	28	20	7	.573	—	—	—	3	—	—
7	Adrian Lindsey	1927–1931	5	44	19	19	6	.500	11	12	2	.480	—	—	—	—	—	—
8	Lewie Hardage	1932–1934	3	27	11	12	4	.481	8	6	1	.567	—	—	—	—	—	—
9	Biff Jones†	1935–1936	2	18	9	6	3	.583	4	4	2	.500	—	—	—	—	—	—
10	Thomas E. Stidham	1937–1940	4	38	27	8	3	.750	15	4	1	.775	0	1	0	1	—	—
11	Dewey Luster	1941–1945	5	48	27	18	3	.594	19	4	2	.800	—	—	—	2	—	—
12	Jim Tatum†	1946	1	11	8	3	0	.727	4	1	0	.800	1	0	0	1	—	—
13	Bud Wilkinson†	1947–1963	17	178	145	29	4	.826	93	9	3	.900	6	2	0	14	3 – 1950, 1955, 1956	AFCA Coach of the Year (1949); AP Coach of the Year (1950)
14	Gomer Jones	1964–1965	2	21	9	11	1	.452	8	5	1	.607	0	1	0	—	—	—
15	Jim Mackenzie	1966	1	10	6	4	0	.600	4	3	0	.571	—	—	—	—	—	—
16	Chuck Fairbanks	1967–1972	6	68	49	18	1	.728	34	8	0	.809	3	1	1	3	—	—
17	Barry Switzer†	1973–1988	16	190	157	29	4	.837	100	11	1	.897	8	5	0	12	3 – 1974, 1975, 1985	Walter Camp Coach of the Year (1974)
18	Gary Gibbs	1989–1994	6	69	44	23	2	.652	26	14	2	.643	2	1	0	—	—	—
19	Howard Schnellenberger	1995	1	11	5	5	1	.500	2	5	0	.286	—	—	—	—	—	—
20	John Blake	1996–1998	3	34	12	22	—	.353	8	16	—	.333	—	—	—	—	—	—
21	Bob Stoops†	1999–2016	18	238	190	48	—	.798	121	29	—	.807	9	9	—	10	1 – 2000	AFCA Coach of the Year (2000) Paul "Bear" Bryant Award (2000); Home Depot Coach of the Year Award (2000); AP Coach of the Year (2000); Eddie Robinson Coach of the Year (2000); Bobby Dodd Coach of the Year Award (2003); Walter Camp Coach of the Year (2000, 2003)
22	Lincoln Riley	2017–2021	5	65	55	10	—	.846	37	7	—	.841	1	3	—	4	—	Broyles Award (2015); Big 12 Coach of the Year (2018) AP Big 12 Coach of the Year (2018)
—	Bob Stoops (Interim)	2021	—	1	1	0	—	1.000	0	0	—	.000	1	0	—	0	—	—
23	Brent Venables	2022–present	4	52	32	20	—	.615	18	16	—	.529	0	3	—	0	—	—
