= Muleshoe High School =

Location
- 514 West Avenue G Muleshoe, Bailey County, Texas 79347-3499; United States; 34.2225053°N 102.7336206°W

Information
- School type: Public, high school
- Locale: Town: Remote
- School district: Muleshoe ISD
- NCES School ID: 483189003547
- Principal: Cindy Bessire
- Teaching staff: 35.14 (on an FTE basis)
- Grades: 9–12
- Enrollment: 341 (2024–2025)
- Student to teacher ratio: 9.70
- Colors: Black & White
- Athletics conference: UIL Class AAA
- Mascot: Mules/Lady Mules
- Website: Muleshoe High School

Muleshoe High School is a public high school located in Muleshoe, Texas (USA) and classified as a 3A school by the UIL. It is part of the Muleshoe Independent School District located in northwest Bailey County. During 2022–2023, Muleshoe High School had an enrollment of 359 students and a student to teacher ratio of 10.04. The school received an overall rating of "B" from the Texas Education Agency for the 2024–2025 school year.

In 2022, Muleshoe High School was named a National Blue Ribbon School.

== Athletics ==
The Muleshoe Mules compete in the following sports

- Baseball
- Basketball
- Cross Country
- Football
- Golf
- Powerlifting
- Softball
- Tennis
- Track and Field

=== State Titles ===
- Speech & Debate Team
  - 2013(2A)
- Football
  - 2008(2A/D1)
- Boys Cross Country
  - 1982(3A), 1983(3A)
- One Act Play
  - 1983(3A), 1985(3A)
