= Baileyboro, Texas =

- Unincorporated community
- Location within Texas Location within the United States
- Coordinates: 34.0267521°N 102.8196615°W
- Country: United States
- State: Texas
- County: Bailey
- Elevation: 3,822 ft (1,165 m)
- Time zone: UTC-6 (Central (CST))
  - Summer (DST): UTC-5 (CDT)
- Area code: 806
- GNIS feature ID: 1379378

Baileyboro is an unincorporated community in Bailey County, in the U.S. state of Texas. According to the Handbook of Texas, the community had a population of 61 in 1980.

== History ==
Baileyboro was first settled sometime before 1900. It had three stores and 100 residents in 1940. It went down to 61 in 1980.

== Geography ==
Baileyboro is located along Farm to Market Road 298 in south-central Bailey County. The Muleshoe National Wildlife Refuge is located southwest of the community.

=== Climate ===
According to the Köppen Climate Classification system, Baileyboro has a semi-arid climate, abbreviated "BSk" on climate maps.

== Education ==
Baileyboro had a school in 1921 and 1940. Today, the community is served by the Muleshoe Independent School District.
