= Cochran County, Texas =

County in Texas, United States

- County
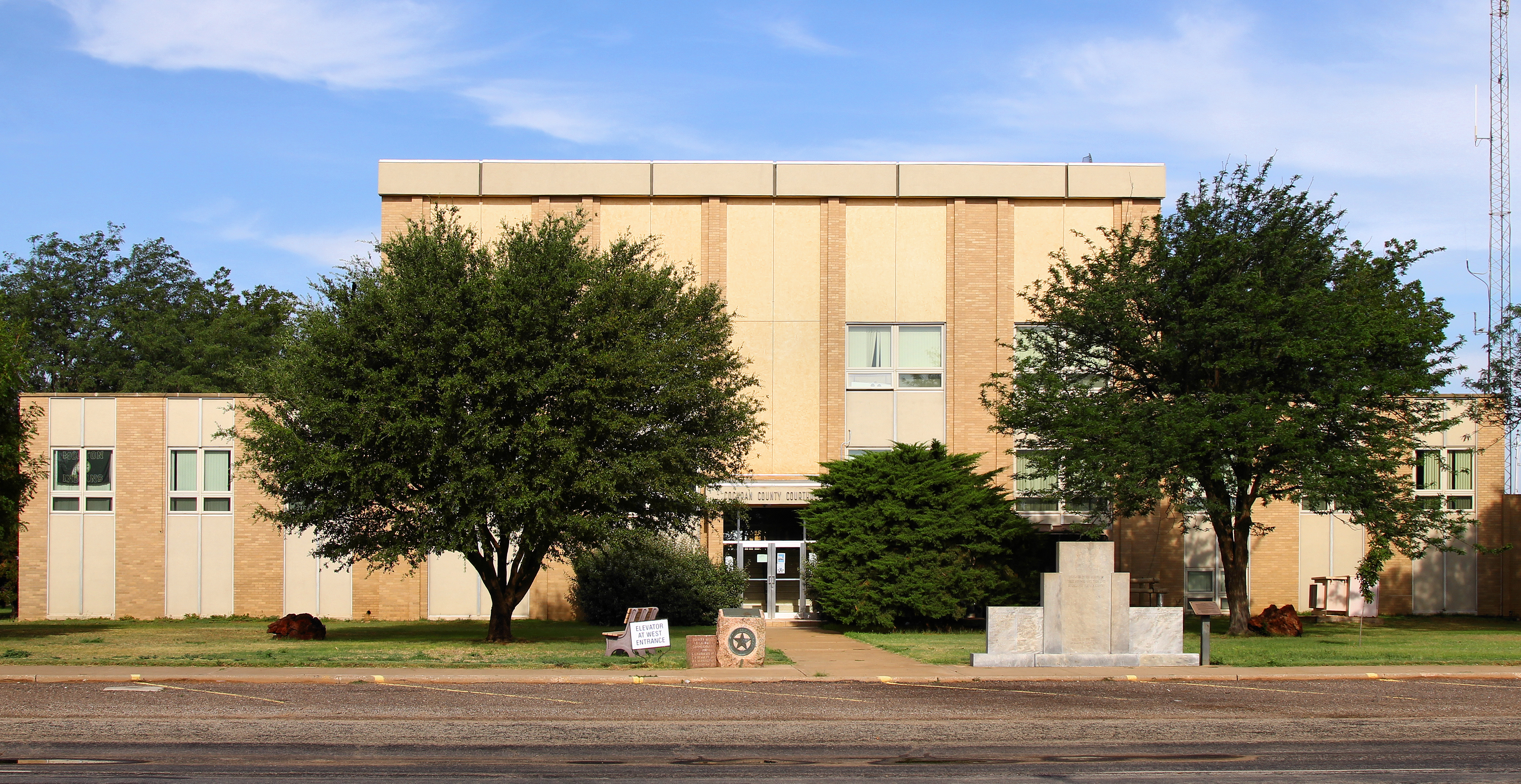
- The Cochran County Courthouse in Morton.

- Location within the U.S. state of Texas
- Coordinates: 33°36′N 102°50′W
- Country: United States
- State: Texas
- Founded: 1924
- Named for: Robert E. Cochran
- Seat: Morton
- Largest city: Morton

Area
  - Total: 775 sq mi (2,010 km^{2})
  - Land: 775 sq mi (2,010 km^{2})
  - Water: 0.09 sq mi (0.23 km^{2}) 0.01%

Population (2020)
  - Total: 2,547
  - Estimate (2025): 2,546 ▼
  - Density: 3.3/sq mi (1.3/km^{2})
- Congressional district: 19th
- Website: www.co.cochran.tx.us

Cochran County is a county located in the U.S. state of Texas. As of the 2020 census, its population was 2,547. The county seat is Morton. The county was created in 1876 and later organized in 1924. It is named for Robert E. Cochran, a defender of the Alamo.

== Geography ==
According to the U.S. Census Bureau, the county has a total area of 775 square miles (2,010 km^{2}), of which 0.09 square miles (0.23 km^{2}) (0.01%) is covered by water. Cochran County lies on the high plains of the Llano Estacado. The western border of the county lies along the border of Texas and New Mexico.

=== Major highways ===
- State Highway 114
- State Highway 125
- State Highway 214

=== Adjacent counties ===
- Bailey County (north)
- Lamb County (northeast)
- Hockley County (east)
- Terry County (southeast)
- Yoakum County (south)
- Lea County, New Mexico (southwest/Mountain Time Zone)
- Roosevelt County, New Mexico (northwest/Mountain Time Zone)

== Demographics ==
Historical population
Census	Pop.	Note	%±
1900	25		—
1910	65		160.0%
1920	67		3.1%
1930	1,963		2,829.9%
1940	3,735		90.3%
1950	5,928		58.7%
1960	6,417		8.2%
1970	5,326		−17.0%
1980	4,825		−9.4%
1990	4,377		−9.3%
2000	3,730		−14.8%
2010	3,127		−16.2%
2020	2,547		−18.5%
2025 (est.)	2,546	▼	0.0%
U.S. Decennial Census; 1850–2010 2010 2020

=== Racial and ethnic composition ===
Cochran County, Texas – Racial and ethnic composition Note: the US Census treats Hispanic/Latino as an ethnic category. This table excludes Latinos from the racial categories and assigns them to a separate category. Hispanics/Latinos may be of any race.
Race / Ethnicity (NH = Non-Hispanic)	Pop 2000	Pop 2010	Pop 2020	% 2000	% 2010	% 2020
White alone (NH)	1,864	1,329	912	49.97%	42.50%	35.81%
Black or African American alone (NH)	168	110	62	4.50%	3.52%	2.43%
Native American or Alaska Native alone (NH)	18	12	6	0.48%	0.38%	0.24%
Asian alone (NH)	8	3	0	0.21%	0.10%	0.00%
Pacific Islander alone (NH)	0	3	0	0.00%	0.10%	0.00%
Other race alone (NH)	0	0	0	0.00%	0.00%	0.00%
Mixed race or multiracial (NH)	26	16	40	0.70%	0.51%	1.57%
Hispanic or Latino (any race)	1,646	1,654	1,527	44.13%	52.89%	59.95%
Total	3,730	3,127	2,547	100.00%	100.00%	100.00%

=== 2020 census ===
As of the 2020 census, the county had a population of 2,547, a median age of 36.0 years, and 28.7% of residents were under the age of 18 while 17.3% were 65 years of age or older; for every 100 females there were 96.1 males, and for every 100 females age 18 and over there were 93.5 males age 18 and over.

The racial makeup of the county was 56.9% White, 2.8% Black or African American, 0.4% American Indian and Alaska Native, 0.2% Asian, <0.1% Native Hawaiian and Pacific Islander, 22.8% from some other race, and 17.0% from two or more races. Hispanic or Latino residents of any race comprised 60.0% of the population.

<0.1% of residents lived in urban areas, while 100.0% lived in rural areas.

There were 940 households in the county, of which 38.3% had children under the age of 18 living in them. Of all households, 54.0% were married-couple households, 16.3% were households with a male householder and no spouse or partner present, and 26.5% were households with a female householder and no spouse or partner present. About 21.9% of all households were made up of individuals and 11.1% had someone living alone who was 65 years of age or older.

There were 1,242 housing units, of which 24.3% were vacant. Among occupied housing units, 77.4% were owner-occupied and 22.6% were renter-occupied. The homeowner vacancy rate was 4.8% and the rental vacancy rate was 9.9%.

=== 2000 census ===
As of the 2000 census, 3,730 people, 1,309 households, and 1,017 families were living in the county. The population density was 5 people per square mile (1.9 people/km^{2}). The 1,587 housing units had an average density of 2 units per square mile (0.77/km^{2}). The racial makeup of the county was 64.48% White, 4.53% African American, 0.83% Native American, 0.21% Asian, 0.05% Pacific Islander, 27.35% from other races, and 2.55% from two or more races. About 44.13% of the population were Hispanics or Latinos of any race.

Of the 1,309 households, 38.1% had children under 18 living with them, 63.8% were married couples living together, 9.9% had a female householder with no husband present, and 22.3% were not families. Around 20.9% of all households were made up of individuals, and 11.1% had someone living alone who was 65 or older. The average household size was 2.79 and the average family size was 3.25.

In the county, the age distribution was 31.5% under the age of 18, 8.0% from 18 to 24, 24.9% from 25 to 44, 21.2% from 45 to 64, and 14.4% who were 65 or older. The median age was 35 years. For every 100 females, there were 92.10 males. For every 100 females 18 and over, there were 93.30 males.

The median income for a household in the county was $27,525, and for a family was $31,163. Males had a median income of $25,064 versus $17,652 for females. The per capita income for the county was $13,125. About 21.40% of families and 27.00% of the population were below the poverty line, including 37.20% of those under age 18 and 11.70% of those age 65 or over.

== Communities ==
- Bledsoe
- Morton (county seat)
- Whiteface

=== Unincorporated communities ===
- Famuliner
- Griffith
- Lehman

== Politics ==
As with other areas in the Solid South, Cochran County voted predominantly Democratic at the presidential level through 1968, except for 1928, then voted solidly Republican, except for 1976.

Cochran County is located within District 88 of the Texas House of Representatives. Cochran County is located within District 31 of the Texas Senate.

United States presidential election results for Cochran County, Texas
Year	Republican		Democratic		Third party(ies)	
Year	No.	%	No.	%	No.	%
1924	9	12.50%	59	81.94%	4	5.56%
1928	197	64.38%	109	35.62%	0	0.00%
1932	31	7.99%	345	88.92%	12	3.09%
1936	58	7.74%	683	91.19%	8	1.07%
1940	122	13.69%	765	85.86%	4	0.45%
1944	123	12.30%	716	71.60%	161	16.10%
1948	119	10.03%	971	81.87%	96	8.09%
1952	780	46.07%	906	53.51%	7	0.41%
1956	599	39.33%	923	60.60%	1	0.07%
1960	646	38.59%	1,028	61.41%	0	0.00%
1964	497	28.22%	1,260	71.55%	4	0.23%
1968	548	33.62%	633	38.83%	449	27.55%
1972	1,106	72.01%	415	27.02%	15	0.98%
1976	701	40.31%	1,031	59.29%	7	0.40%
1980	1,064	66.21%	513	31.92%	30	1.87%
1984	1,117	66.13%	557	32.98%	15	0.89%
1988	771	52.74%	681	46.58%	10	0.68%
1992	750	51.33%	454	31.07%	257	17.59%
1996	667	49.93%	541	40.49%	128	9.58%
2000	807	68.92%	344	29.38%	20	1.71%
2004	856	77.12%	249	22.43%	5	0.45%
2008	758	71.71%	284	26.87%	15	1.42%
2012	649	70.77%	256	27.92%	12	1.31%
2016	679	75.36%	190	21.09%	32	3.55%
2020	809	80.90%	177	17.70%	14	1.40%
2024	735	82.31%	148	16.57%	10	1.12%

United States Senate election results for Cochran County, Texas1
Year	Republican		Democratic		Third party(ies)	
Year	No.	%	No.	%	No.	%
2024	706	80.23%	149	16.93%	25	2.84%

United States Senate election results for Cochran County, Texas2
Year	Republican		Democratic		Third party(ies)	
Year	No.	%	No.	%	No.	%
2020	765	78.22%	183	18.71%	30	3.07%

Texas Gubernatorial election results for Cochran County
Year	Republican		Democratic		Third party(ies)	
Year	No.	%	No.	%	No.	%
2022	506	82.14%	95	15.42%	15	2.44%

== Education ==
School districts serving the county include:

- Morton Independent School District
- Sudan Independent School District
- Whiteface Consolidated Independent School District

Three Way Independent School District formerly served a part of Cochran County. It closed in 2002, becoming a part of Sudan ISD.

The county is in the service area of South Plains College.

== See also ==
- Recorded Texas Historic Landmarks in Cochran County
