= Roosevelt High School (Lubbock County, Texas) =

Location
- 1406 County Road 3300; Lubbock, Texas 79403-9643; United States; 33.5827°N 101.6757°W

Information
- Type: Public high school
- Motto: Where Great Minds Soar!
- School district: Roosevelt Independent School District
- NCES School ID: 483780004233
- Principal: Tim crane
- Teaching staff: 37.21 (on an FTE basis)
- Grades: 9–12
- Enrollment: 332 (2024–2025)
- Student to teacher ratio: 8.92
- Colors: Maroon and White
- Athletics conference: UIL Class 3A
- Mascot: Eagle
- Website: hs.roosevelt.k12.tx.us

Roosevelt High School is a public high school in unincorporated Lubbock County, Texas, United States, with a Lubbock postal address. It is part of the Roosevelt Independent School District and classified as a 3A school by the University Interscholastic League. In 2015, the school was rated "Met Standard" by the Texas Education Agency.

== Athletics ==
The Roosevelt Eagles compete in cross country, football, basketball, powerlifting, golf, tennis, track, baseball, and softball.

=== State Titles ===
- Girls Basketball
  - 1957(B), 1965(1A)
