= Bailey County, Texas =

County in Texas, United States

- County
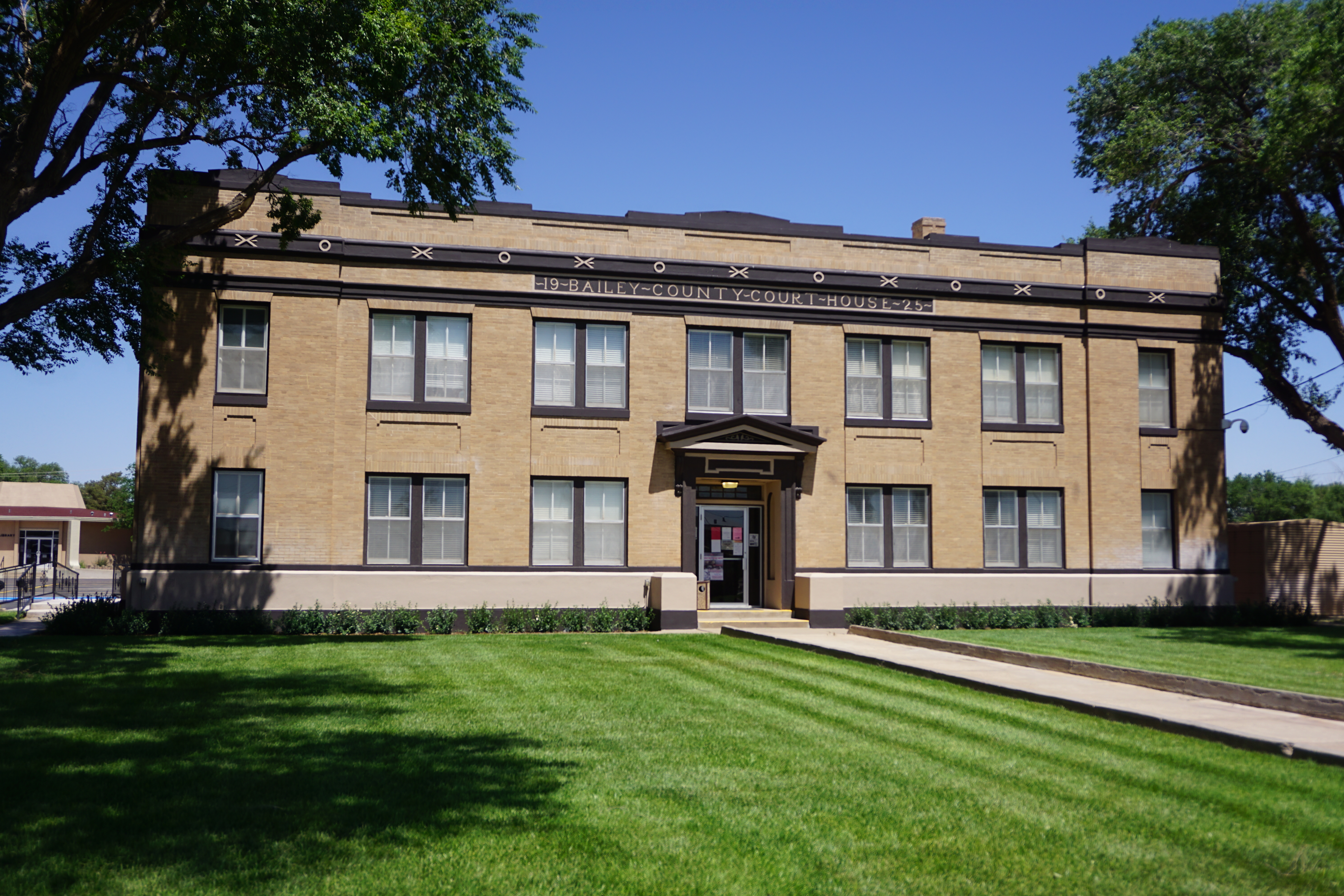
- The Bailey County Courthouse in Muleshoe

- Location within the U.S. state of Texas
- Coordinates: 34°04′N 102°50′W
- Country: United States
- State: Texas
- Founded: 1919
- Named for: Peter James Bailey
- Seat: Muleshoe
- Largest city: Muleshoe

Area
  - Total: 827 sq mi (2,140 km^{2})
  - Land: 827 sq mi (2,140 km^{2})
  - Water: 0.7 sq mi (1.8 km^{2}) 0.08%

Population (2020)
  - Total: 6,904
  - Estimate (2025): 6,963 ▲
  - Density: 8.3/sq mi (3.2/km^{2})
- Time zone: UTC−6 (Central)
  - Summer (DST): UTC−5 (CDT)
- Congressional district: 19th
- Website: www.co.bailey.tx.us

Bailey County is a county located in the U.S. state of Texas. It is in West Texas and its county seat is Muleshoe. As of the 2020 census, its population was 6,904.

== History ==
In 1876, the Texas Legislature established Bailey County from portions of Bexar County, naming it for Peter James Bailey, a defender of the Alamo. (See List of Texas county name etymologies.) The county organized in 1919.

Bailey County history is highlighted in the Muleshoe Heritage Center located off U.S. Highways 70 and 84 in Muleshoe. The Muleshoe National Wildlife Refuge was founded in 1935 and is the oldest such refuge in Texas.

Bailey County once was one of 30 prohibition or entirely dry counties in Texas, but is now a wet county.

== Geography ==
According to the U.S. Census Bureau, the county has a total area of 827 sq mi (2,140 km^{2}), of which 0.7 sq mi (1.8 km^{2}) (0.08%) is covered by water.

=== Major highways ===
- U.S. Highway 70
- U.S. Highway 84
- State Highway 214

=== Adjacent counties ===
- Parmer County (north)
- Lamb County (east)
- Hockley County (southeast)
- Cochran County (south)
- Roosevelt County, New Mexico (west/Mountain Time Zone)
- Curry County, New Mexico (northwest/Mountain Time Zone)

=== National protected areas ===
- Grulla National Wildlife Refuge (part)
- Muleshoe National Wildlife Refuge

== Demographics ==
Historical population
Census	Pop.	Note	%±
1900	4		—
1910	312		7,700.0%
1920	517		65.7%
1930	5,186		903.1%
1940	6,318		21.8%
1950	7,592		20.2%
1960	9,090		19.7%
1970	8,487		−6.6%
1980	8,168		−3.8%
1990	7,064		−13.5%
2000	6,594		−6.7%
2010	7,165		8.7%
2020	6,904		−3.6%
2025 (est.)	6,963	▲	0.9%
U.S. Decennial Census; 1850–1900 1910; 1920 1930 1940; 1950 1960 1970; 1980 1990 2000; 2010 2020

=== 2020 census ===
As of the 2020 census, the county had a population of 6,904. The median age was 33.6 years. 29.9% of residents were under the age of 18 and 14.5% of residents were 65 years of age or older. For every 100 females there were 106.5 males, and for every 100 females age 18 and over there were 104.0 males age 18 and over.

The racial makeup of the county was 48.5% White, 0.9% Black or African American, 1.2% American Indian and Alaska Native, 0.2% Asian, <0.1% Native Hawaiian and Pacific Islander, 29.6% from some other race, and 19.6% from two or more races. Hispanic or Latino residents of any race comprised 65.8% of the population.

74.7% of residents lived in urban areas, while 25.3% lived in rural areas.

There were 2,359 households in the county, of which 40.8% had children under the age of 18 living in them. Of all households, 53.3% were married-couple households, 18.1% were households with a male householder and no spouse or partner present, and 22.1% were households with a female householder and no spouse or partner present. About 20.6% of all households were made up of individuals and 10.4% had someone living alone who was 65 years of age or older.

There were 2,746 housing units, of which 14.1% were vacant. Among occupied housing units, 65.2% were owner-occupied and 34.8% were renter-occupied. The homeowner vacancy rate was 1.5% and the rental vacancy rate was 6.6%.

=== Racial and ethnic composition ===
Bailey County, Texas – Racial and ethnic composition Note: the US Census treats Hispanic/Latino as an ethnic category. This table excludes Latinos from the racial categories and assigns them to a separate category. Hispanics/Latinos may be of any race.
Race / Ethnicity (NH = Non-Hispanic)	Pop 2000	Pop 2010	Pop 2020	% 2000	% 2010	% 2020
White alone (NH)	3,317	2,748	2,190	50.30%	38.31%	31.72%
Black or African American alone (NH)	76	67	49	1.15%	0.94%	0.71%
Native American or Alaska Native alone (NH)	16	16	24	0.24%	0.22%	0.35%
Asian alone (NH)	8	23	8	0.12%	0.32%	0.12%
Pacific Islander alone (NH)	0	0	0	0.00%	0.00%	0.00%
Other race alone (NH)	2	2	27	0.03%	0.03%	0.39%
Mixed race or Multiracial (NH)	56	29	66	0.85%	0.40%	0.96%
Hispanic or Latino (any race)	3,119	4,283	4,540	47.30%	59.78%	65.76%
Total	6,594	7,165	6,904	100.00%	100.00%	100.00%

=== 2010 census ===
As of the 2010 United States census, 7,165 people lived in the county. About 75.3% were White, 1.4% Native American, 1.2% Black or African American, 0.4% Asian, 0.1% Pacific Islander, 19.6% of some other race, and 2.0% of two or more races; 59.8% were Hispanics or Latinos (of any race).

=== 2000 census ===
As of the 2000 census, 6,594 people, 2,348 households, and 1,777 families lived in the county. The population density was eight people per square mile (3.1 people/km^{2}). The 2,738 housing units averaged three units per square mile (1.2/km^{2}). The racial makeup of the county was 66.68% White, 1.27% Black or African American, 0.65% Native American, 0.14% Asian, 28.60% from other races, and 2.65% from two or more races; 47.30% of the population were Hispanic or Latino of any race.

Of the 2,348 households, 37.1% had children under living with them, 64.9% were married couples living together, 7.5% had a female householder with no husband present, and 24.3% were not families. About 22.3% of all households were made up of individuals, and 12.8% had someone living alone who was 65 or older. The average household size was 2.78, and the average family size was 3.28.

In the county, the age distribution was 30.3% under 18, 8.6% from 18 to 24, 24.7% from 25 to 44, 21.2% from 45 to 64, and 15.2% who were 65 years of age or older. The median age was 35 years. For every 100 females, there were 96.0 males. For every 100 females age 18 and over, there were 94.1 males.

The median income for a household in the county was $27,901, and for a family was $32,898. Males had a median income of $25,150 versus $18,309 for females. The per capita income for the county was $12,979. About 13.50% of families and 16.70% of the population were below the poverty line, including 20.40% of those under age 18 and 12.60% of those age 65 or over.

== Education ==
Most of Bailey County is served by the Muleshoe Independent School District, which extends into neighboring counties. Farwell Independent School District and Sudan Independent School District, which are based in nearby counties, extend into Bailey County and serve small portions of it.

Three Way Independent School District formerly served a part of Bailey County. It closed in 2002, becoming a part of Sudan ISD.

The county is in the service area of South Plains College.

== Communities ==
=== City ===
- Muleshoe (county seat)

=== Unincorporated communities ===
- Baileyboro
- Bula
- Circle Back
- Enochs
- Goodland
- Maple
- Needmore
- Progress

=== Ghost town ===
- Virginia City

== Politics ==
Bailey County is located within District 88 of the Texas House of Representatives. Bailey County is located within District 31 of the Texas Senate.

United States presidential election results for Bailey County, Texas
Year	Republican		Democratic		Third party(ies)	
Year	No.	%	No.	%	No.	%
1924	63	25.20%	166	66.40%	21	8.40%
1928	410	74.28%	142	25.72%	0	0.00%
1932	104	10.86%	851	88.83%	3	0.31%
1936	191	19.23%	788	79.36%	14	1.41%
1940	330	23.62%	1,066	76.31%	1	0.07%
1944	358	24.55%	943	64.68%	157	10.77%
1948	234	16.12%	1,115	76.79%	103	7.09%
1952	1,118	51.71%	1,039	48.06%	5	0.23%
1956	871	40.49%	1,274	59.23%	6	0.28%
1960	1,180	51.96%	1,064	46.85%	27	1.19%
1964	1,056	41.22%	1,503	58.67%	3	0.12%
1968	1,174	45.90%	820	32.06%	564	22.05%
1972	1,837	79.70%	465	20.17%	3	0.13%
1976	1,255	47.77%	1,356	51.62%	16	0.61%
1980	1,809	68.14%	800	30.13%	46	1.73%
1984	1,888	73.01%	684	26.45%	14	0.54%
1988	1,459	62.27%	876	37.39%	8	0.34%
1992	1,308	55.31%	677	28.63%	380	16.07%
1996	1,246	60.31%	706	34.17%	114	5.52%
2000	1,589	76.03%	488	23.35%	13	0.62%
2004	1,882	78.03%	525	21.77%	5	0.21%
2008	1,618	69.86%	682	29.45%	16	0.69%
2012	1,339	73.73%	466	25.66%	11	0.61%
2016	1,344	74.96%	397	22.14%	52	2.90%
2020	1,434	77.10%	409	21.99%	17	0.91%
2024	1,395	80.13%	332	19.07%	14	0.80%

United States Senate election results for Bailey County, Texas1
Year	Republican		Democratic		Third party(ies)	
Year	No.	%	No.	%	No.	%
2024	1,352	78.93%	325	18.97%	36	2.10%

United States Senate election results for Bailey County, Texas2
Year	Republican		Democratic		Third party(ies)	
Year	No.	%	No.	%	No.	%
2020	1,400	76.84%	383	21.02%	39	2.14%

Texas Gubernatorial election results for Bailey County
Year	Republican		Democratic		Third party(ies)	
Year	No.	%	No.	%	No.	%
2022	1,105	82.90%	213	15.98%	15	1.13%

== See also ==
- Dry counties
- Recorded Texas Historic Landmarks in Bailey County
