= Morton, Texas =

- City
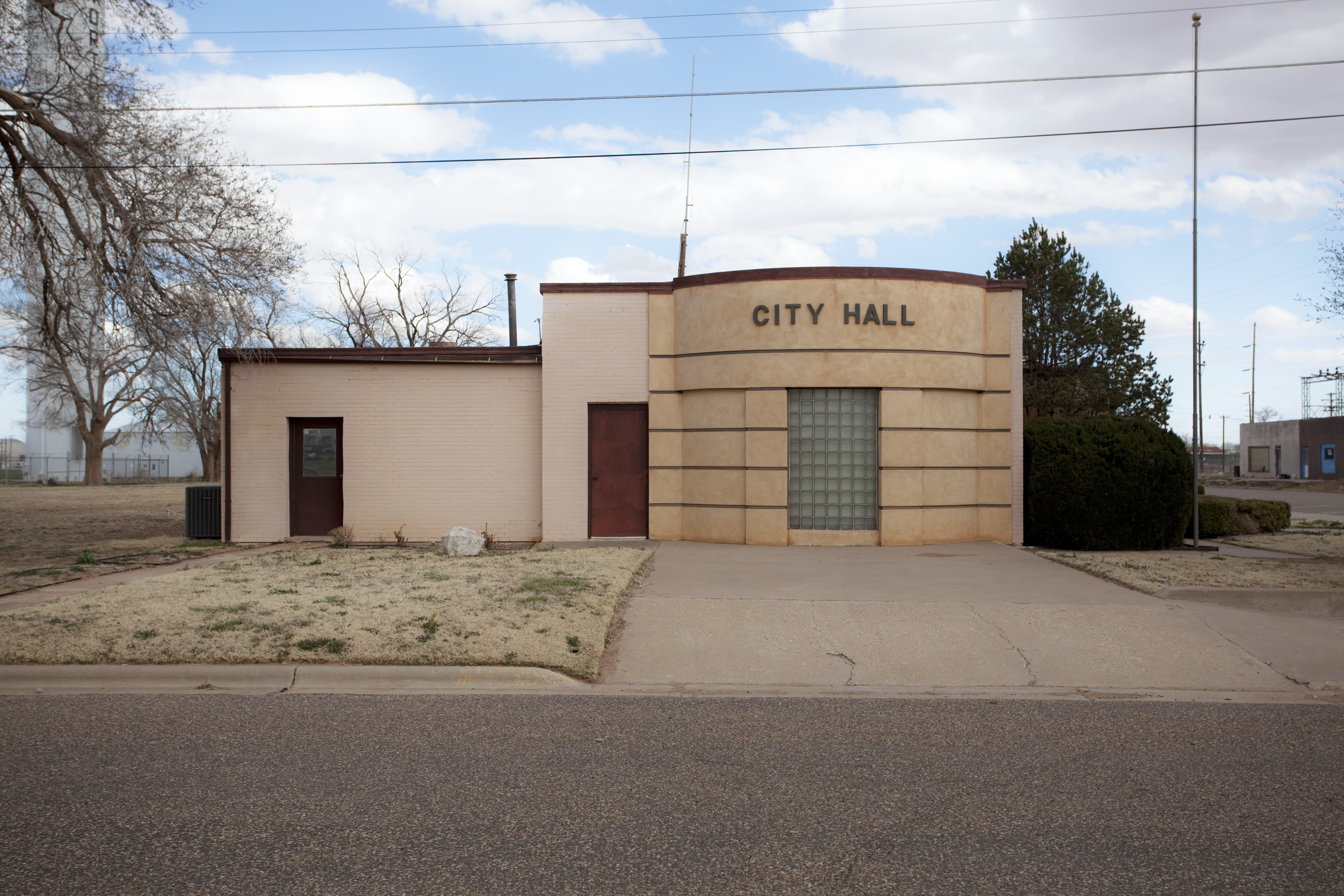
- City Hall

- Location within Texas
- Coordinates: 33°43′30″N 102°45′34″W
- Country: United States
- State: Texas
- County: Cochran
- Region: Llano Estacado
- Established: 1923

Area
  - Total: 1.51 sq mi (3.90 km^{2})
  - Land: 1.51 sq mi (3.90 km^{2})
  - Water: 0 sq mi (0.00 km^{2})
- Elevation: 3,760 ft (1,146 m)

Population (2020)
  - Total: 1,690
  - Density: 1,122.3/sq mi (433.33/km^{2})
- Time zone: UTC−6 (CST)
  - Summer (DST): UTC−5 (CDT)
- ZIP Code: 79346
- Area code: 806
- FIPS code: 48-49464
- GNIS feature ID: 1363181

Morton is a city in and the county seat of Cochran County, Texas, United States. As of the 2020 census, the city's population was 1,690, a 15.8% population decline since the 2010 census.

== History ==
Famous cattle baron Christopher C. Slaughter died in 1919, and in 1921, his heirs dissolved his cattle company. Slaughter's eldest daughter, Minnie Slaughter Veal, hired an agent to sell her share of the property, and this agent—named Morton Smith—founded the town of Morton. In 1923, the townsite was platted, and Smith's land office was on the east side of the square. In 1924, Morton became the county seat over a town called Ligon. The Slaughters had founded Ligon and were hoping that it would become the county seat. Cochran County's western boundary is along the Texas–New Mexico border.

Ranches continued to be sold as farmland throughout the 1920s. According to the Handbook of Texas, a family named Winder was so large that it doubled the population of Morton. Mrs. Mary Winder served as Morton's first postmistress (1924–1943). Since Cochran County was one of the last in the state to be broken out into farmland and settled, the motto for Morton became "The Last Frontier".

Morton was spared the fate of many Texas towns that shriveled and died after being bypassed by the railroad during the 1930s and 1940s. Morton, being the county seat, plus having all that former rangeland newly broken out into farmland, attracted many new farming families to move in during that time, and helped Morton not only survive, but also to grow and thrive.

In 1933, Morton was incorporated, with Henry Cox as the town's first mayor.

Morton was the hometown of Lt. Col. George Andrew Davis, Jr., a World War II ace who was killed in the Korean War.

== Geography ==
Morton is located in northeastern Cochran County at 33°43′30″N 102°45′34″W. at an altitude around 3,800 feet (1,200 m) above mean sea level. The topography of the area is generally flat, with higher elevation to the western part of the county, gently sloping downward to the east. Morton is located in what is known as the "Staked Plains" or Llano Estacado, which is in the southern portion of the Great Plains. Morton lies on the western extreme of the Central Time Zone, just over 16 miles (26 km) east of the Mountain Time Zone. It is 55 miles (89 km) west of Lubbock and 79 miles (127 km) southeast of Clovis, New Mexico.

The center of the city of Morton (location of the county courthouse) lies adjacent to the northwest corner of the intersection of State Highways 114 and 214.

According to the United States Census Bureau, the city has a total area of 1.4 square miles (3.6 km^{2}), all land, except for Strickland Lake, a small, man-made pond located in the southwestern part of the city.

About 20 miles (32 km) to the north of Morton, along Texas State Highway 214 is the Muleshoe National Wildlife Refuge, home to a large sandhill crane migration each autumn, and year-round home to a sizable prairie dog town.

=== Climate ===
Morton has a mild, semiarid climate. On average, Morton receives 18 inches (460 mm) of precipitation per year. Summers in Morton are hot, with high temperatures in the 90s °F and dropping into the 60s °F at nights. The highest recorded temperature was 110 °F (43 °C) in June 1994. Winter days in Morton are typically sunny and relatively mild in the mid-50s °F, but nights are cold, with temperatures dipping to the mid-20s °F. The lowest recorded temperature was −12 °F (−24 °C) in January 1963.

Climate data for Morton, Texas (1991–2020 normals, extremes 1962–present)
Month	Jan	Feb	Mar	Apr	May	Jun	Jul	Aug	Sep	Oct	Nov	Dec	Year
Record high °F (°C)	82 (28)	86 (30)	100 (38)	99 (37)	107 (42)	111 (44)	110 (43)	108 (42)	106 (41)	99 (37)	87 (31)	81 (27)	111 (44)
Mean maximum °F (°C)	73.9 (23.3)	78.0 (25.6)	85.1 (29.5)	90.1 (32.3)	97.0 (36.1)	102.6 (39.2)	101.6 (38.7)	100.1 (37.8)	96.2 (35.7)	90.5 (32.5)	81.3 (27.4)	73.3 (22.9)	105.3 (40.7)
Mean daily maximum °F (°C)	55.0 (12.8)	59.4 (15.2)	66.9 (19.4)	75.4 (24.1)	83.5 (28.6)	91.9 (33.3)	93.0 (33.9)	91.6 (33.1)	84.5 (29.2)	75.2 (24.0)	63.8 (17.7)	55.3 (12.9)	74.6 (23.7)
Daily mean °F (°C)	39.7 (4.3)	43.3 (6.3)	50.5 (10.3)	58.5 (14.7)	67.9 (19.9)	76.8 (24.9)	79.1 (26.2)	77.5 (25.3)	70.3 (21.3)	59.8 (15.4)	48.5 (9.2)	40.6 (4.8)	59.4 (15.2)
Mean daily minimum °F (°C)	24.4 (−4.2)	27.2 (−2.7)	34.0 (1.1)	41.6 (5.3)	52.4 (11.3)	61.8 (16.6)	65.1 (18.4)	63.5 (17.5)	56.1 (13.4)	44.5 (6.9)	33.1 (0.6)	25.9 (−3.4)	44.1 (6.7)
Mean minimum °F (°C)	12.6 (−10.8)	14.6 (−9.7)	19.8 (−6.8)	29.3 (−1.5)	39.8 (4.3)	53.6 (12.0)	59.9 (15.5)	57.3 (14.1)	44.9 (7.2)	30.1 (−1.1)	19.4 (−7.0)	12.3 (−10.9)	7.9 (−13.4)
Record low °F (°C)	−12 (−24)	−2 (−19)	7 (−14)	21 (−6)	25 (−4)	40 (4)	52 (11)	48 (9)	32 (0)	13 (−11)	5 (−15)	−4 (−20)	−12 (−24)
Average precipitation inches (mm)	0.62 (16)	0.61 (15)	1.11 (28)	0.87 (22)	1.94 (49)	2.27 (58)	2.36 (60)	2.53 (64)	2.32 (59)	1.48 (38)	0.85 (22)	0.63 (16)	17.59 (447)
Average snowfall inches (cm)	1.4 (3.6)	1.4 (3.6)	0.4 (1.0)	0.1 (0.25)	0.0 (0.0)	0.0 (0.0)	0.0 (0.0)	0.0 (0.0)	0.0 (0.0)	0.2 (0.51)	1.2 (3.0)	1.6 (4.1)	6.3 (16)
Average precipitation days (≥ 0.01 in)	2.6	2.9	4.1	3.2	5.7	6.5	6.4	7.1	6.0	5.0	3.4	2.8	55.7
Average snowy days (≥ 0.1 in)	1.0	0.9	0.3	0.2	0.0	0.0	0.0	0.0	0.0	0.2	0.6	1.1	4.3
Source: NOAA

== Demographics ==
Historical population
Census	Pop.	Note	%±
1940	1,137		—
1950	2,274		100.0%
1960	2,731		20.1%
1970	2,738		0.3%
1980	2,674		−2.3%
1990	2,597		−2.9%
2000	2,249		−13.4%
2010	2,006		−10.8%
2020	1,690		−15.8%
U.S. Decennial Census

=== 2020 census ===
As of the 2020 census, Morton had a population of 1,690; the median age was 35.9 years, 28.7% of residents were under 18, and 17.5% were 65 or older. For every 100 females, there were 96.7 males, and for every 100 females 18 and over, there were 91.6 males 18 and over.

None of residents lived in urban areas, while 100.0% lived in rural areas.

Of the 622 households in Morton, 36.3% had children under 18 living in them, 50.6% were married-couple households, 16.6% were households with a male householder and no spouse or partner present, and 30.2% were households with a female householder and no spouse or partner present. About 25.6% of all households were made up of individuals, and 13.3% had someone living alone who was 65 or older.

The city had 836 housing units, of which 25.6% were vacant. The homeowner vacancy rate was 6.2% and the rental vacancy rate was 11.8%.

Racial composition as of the 2020 census
Race	Number	Percent
White	812	48.0%
Black or African American	58	3.4%
American Indian and Alaska Native	7	0.4%
Asian	4	0.2%
Some other race	491	29.1%
Two or more races	318	18.8%
Hispanic or Latino (of any race)	1,221	72.2%

=== 2010 census ===
As of the census of 2010, 2,006 people, 717 households, and 522 families resided in the city. The population density was 1,432.9 people per square mile. The 845 housing units averaged 603.6 per square mile. The racial makeup of the city was 61.1% Hispanic or Latino, 33.5% White alone, 4.4% Black, and less than 1% other races.

In 2010, of the 717 households, 33.6% had children under 18 living with them, 51.7% were married couples living together, 15.3% had a female householder with no husband present, and 27.2% were not families. About 11.3% were individuals living alone over 65. The average household size was 2.79, and the average family size was 3.33.

In the city, the age distribution was 25.6% under 15, 8% from 15 to 19, 6.2% from 20 to 24, 22.9% from 25 to 44, 23.1% from 45 to 64, and 14.1% who were 65 or older. The median age was 34 years. For every 100 females, there were 93.7 males. For every 100 females 18 and over, there were 92.2 males.

== Education ==
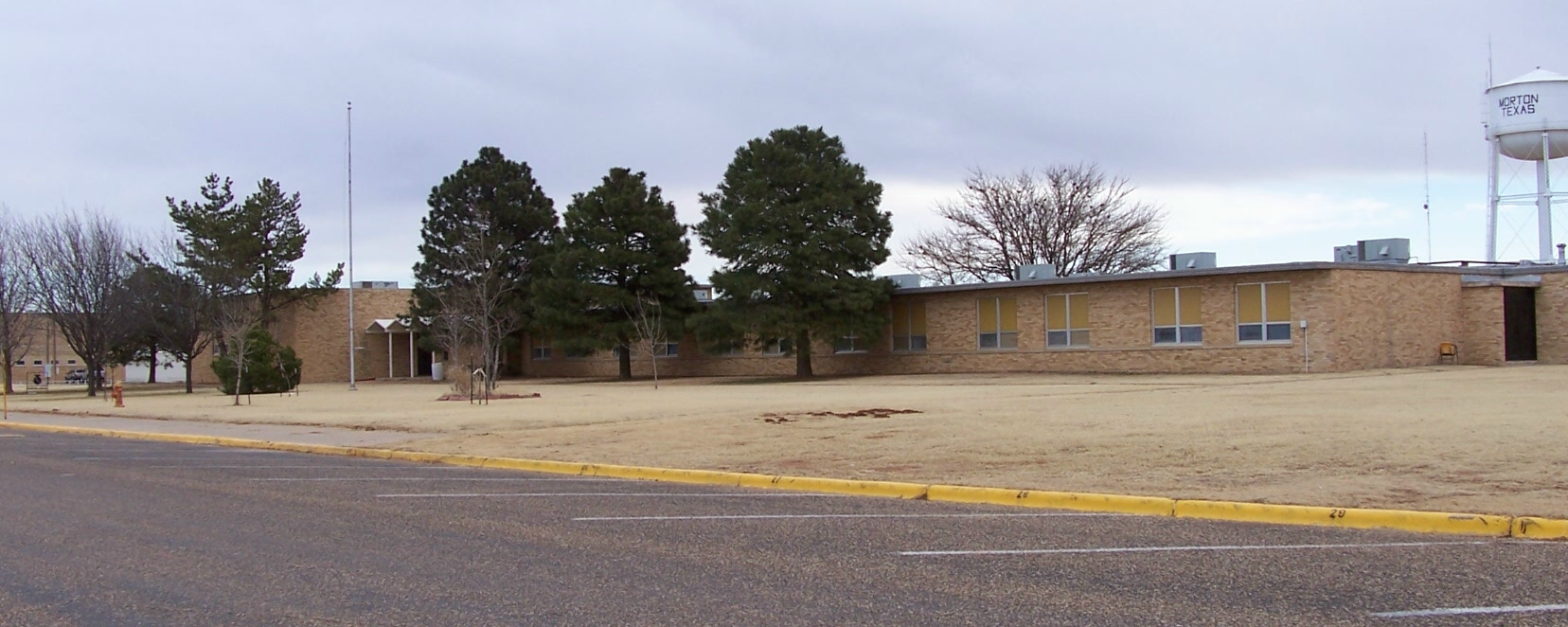
Morton High School

The city is served by the Morton Independent School District. The Morton High School mascot is the Indians. The school colors are black and gold, with white.

== Media ==
For many years, Morton was served by The Morton Tribune, a weekly newspaper that published on Thursdays, but went out of business sometime after 2010. Some of the townspeople are also regular readers of the Lubbock Avalanche-Journal, which is published in Lubbock and delivered to Morton daily.

== Infrastructure ==
The Morton Memorial Cemetery, about 2 miles (3 km) north of the city center on Highway 214, is a maintained final resting place for former members of the community. Remains of some Native Americans are also buried there, with a large marker, on the western end of the cemetery.
