= Virginia City, Texas =

Coordinates: 33.9944°N 102.9044°W

Virginia City is a ghost town in southwest Bailey County, Texas, United States. It was located 2 miles southeast of the present intersection of Farm Roads 298 and 1731 in southwest Bailey County, 25 miles southwest of Muleshoe. It was platted on March 13, 1909, by Matthew C. Vaughn and Samuel D. McCloud. The original townsite called for a lot reserved for a courthouse and others for schools, churches, and a park. The same year it was platted, an Iowa land company bought the site and advertised for prospective buyers. A hotel was built to house visitors, and several stores were established. A roadbed for a railroad was graded through the town, although whether the construction was genuine or merely a speculation trick was disputed. The venture failed, and the town was abandoned by 1913.

== See also ==
- List of ghost towns in Texas
