= Sudan, Texas =

- City
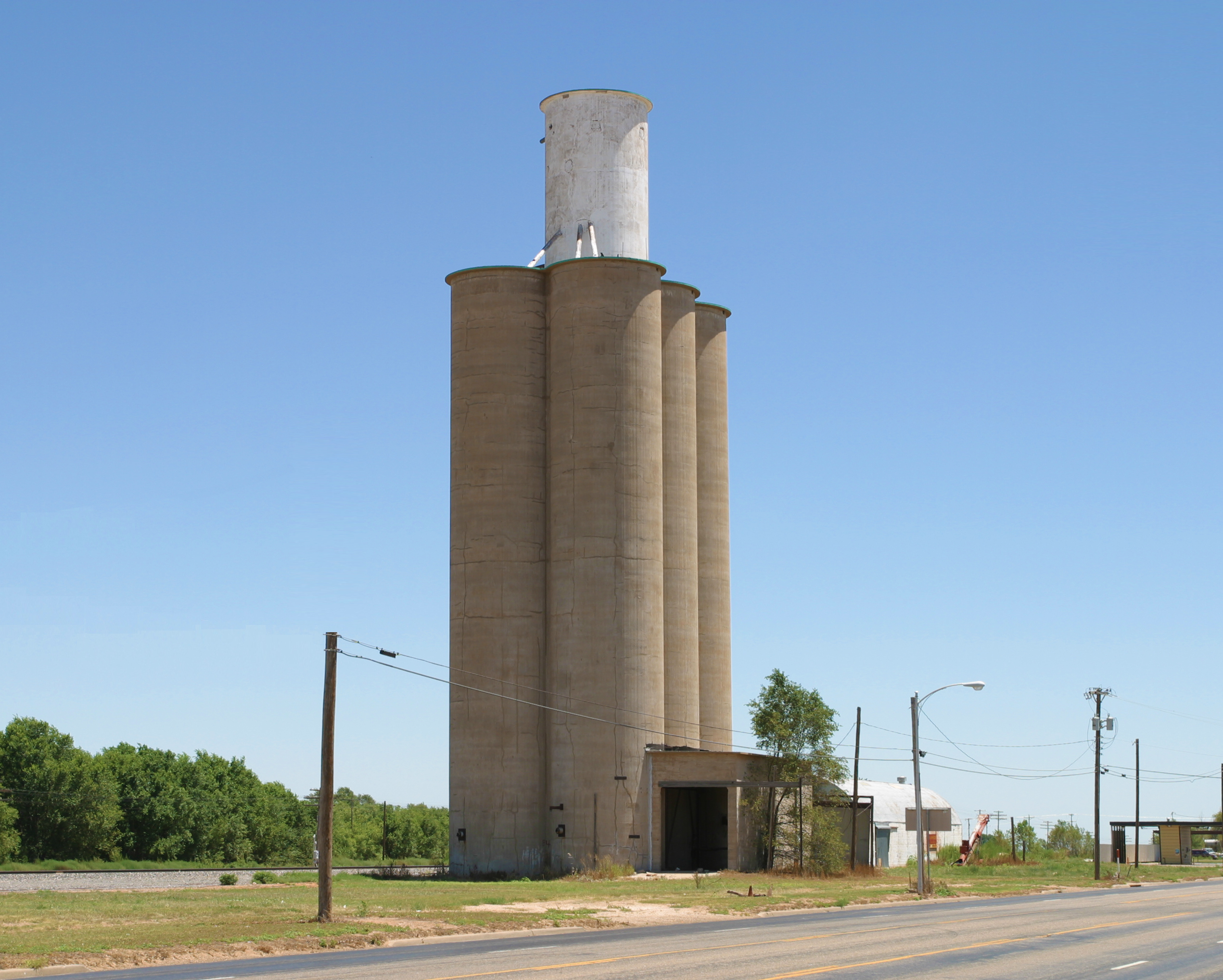
- Grain elevator in Sudan

- Location within Texas
- Coordinates: 34°04′04″N 102°31′28″W
- Country: United States
- State: Texas
- County: Lamb
- Region: Llano Estacado
- Established: 1918

Area
  - Total: 1.02 sq mi (2.65 km^{2})
  - Land: 1.02 sq mi (2.65 km^{2})
  - Water: 0 sq mi (0.00 km^{2})
- Elevation: 3,757 ft (1,145 m)

Population (2020)
  - Total: 940
  - Density: 920/sq mi (350/km^{2})
- Time zone: UTC-6 (CST)
- ZIP code: 79371
- Area code: 806
- FIPS code: 48-70772
- Website: www.cityofsudantx.com

Sudan is a city in Lamb County, Texas, United States. Its population was 940 at the 2020 census.

== History ==
According to The Handbook of Texas, the area where the town is now located was once granted to the county in 1892 by the 77 Ranch, owned by S.B. Wilson and Wilson Furneaux. The town developed in 1917–1918 with a hotel and service from the Santa Fe railroad, which had built a branch line from Lubbock, Texas, to Texico, New Mexico, in 1913. The land company manager and first postmaster, P.E. Boesen, suggested the town's name in 1918. A gin was built in 1922 and a bank established a year later. The town was incorporated in 1925, when the population was 600, up from a population of only 15 in 1920. The first of several grain elevators was also erected in 1925 and the Sudan News began publication. The population was 1,014 in 1930, 1,336 in 1950, 976 in 1970, and 1,091 in 1980. In 1990, it was 983. The population reached 1,039 in 2000.

== Geography ==
According to the United States Census Bureau, the city has a total area of 0.9 square miles (2.3 km^{2}), all of it land.

== Demographics ==
Historical population
Census	Pop.	Note	%±
1930	1,014		—
1940	974		−3.9%
1950	1,348		38.4%
1960	1,235		−8.4%
1970	976		−21.0%
1980	1,091		11.8%
1990	983		−9.9%
2000	1,039		5.7%
2010	958		−7.8%
2020	940		−1.9%
U.S. Decennial Census

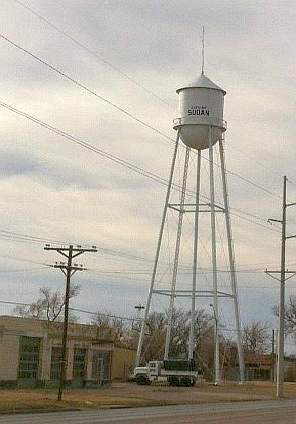
Municipal water tower in Sudan, Texas

=== 2020 census ===
As of the 2020 census, 940 people lived in Sudan. The median age was 35.4 years; 29.1% of residents were under the age of 18 and 18.2% of residents were 65 years of age or older. For every 100 females there were 100.9 males, and for every 100 females age 18 and over there were 94.7 males age 18 and over.

There were 342 households in Sudan, of which 35.7% had children under the age of 18 living in them. Of all households, 57.6% were married-couple households, 14.9% were households with a male householder and no spouse or partner present, and 24.6% were households with a female householder and no spouse or partner present. About 21.1% of all households were made up of individuals and 12.3% had someone living alone who was 65 years of age or older. There were 409 housing units, of which 16.4% were vacant; the homeowner vacancy rate was 0.0% and the rental vacancy rate was 14.3%.

0.0% of residents lived in urban areas, while 100.0% lived in rural areas.

Racial composition as of the 2020 census
Race	Number	Percent
White	603	64.1%
Black or African American	25	2.7%
American Indian and Alaska Native	6	0.6%
Asian	0	0.0%
Native Hawaiian and Other Pacific Islander	0	0.0%
Some other race	137	14.6%
Two or more races	169	18.0%
Hispanic or Latino (of any race)	431	45.9%

=== 2000 census ===
As of the census of 2000, 1,039 people, 410 households, and 293 families resided in the city. The population density was 1,145.3 inhabitants per square mile (442.2/km^{2}). The 460 housing units averaged 507.1 per square mile (195.2/km^{2}). The racial makeup of the city was 74.11% White, 5.39% African American, 0.19% Native American, 18.86% from other races, and 1.44% from two or more races. Hispanics or Latinos of any race were 29.93% of the population.

Of the 410 households, 33.2% had children under 18 living with them, 58.8% were married couples living together, 9.3% had a female householder with no husband present, and 28.5% were not families. About 26.8% of all households were made up of individuals, and 18.5% had someone living alone who was 65 years of age or older. The average household size was 2.53 and the average family size was 3.07.

In the city, the population was distributed as 28.8% under 18, 6.8% from 18 to 24, 24.0% from 25 to 44, 22.5% from 45 to 64, and 17.9% who were 65 or older. The median age was 38 years. For every 100 females, there were 83.2 males. For every 100 females age 18 and over, there were 81.8 males.

The median income for a household in the city was $31,736, and for a family was $37,679. Males had a median income of $30,288 versus $22,500 for females. The per capita income for the city was $17,727. About 14.5% of families and 16.2% of the population were below the poverty line, including 19.9% of those under age 18 and 20.0% of those age 65 or over.

== Education ==
The City of Sudan is served by the Sudan Independent School District.

Sudan High School has been designated a U.S. Department of Education National Blue Ribbon School. Sudan ISD is also a Texas Education Agency Exemplary ranked campus, and has received multiple Bronze designations in U.S. News & World Report's annual "America's Best High Schools" feature. Sudan High School continues to have success in both curricular and extracurricular events and has won numerous state championships in both sports and academics.

== Notable people ==
- Vendyl Jones (1930–2010), Noahide scholar who directed archaeological searches for artifacts such as the Ark of the Covenant.

== See also ==
- Sudan
- Earth, Texas
- Llano Estacado
- Plant X
