= Muleshoe Independent School District =

School district in Texas

Location
- Muleshoe, Texas ESC Region 17 USA
- Coordinates: 34.2238°N 102.7328°W

District information
- Type: Public Independent school district
- Grades: EE through 12
- Superintendent: R. L. Richards
- Schools: 5 (2011-12)
- NCES District ID: 4831890

Students and staff
- Students: 1,423 (2014–15)
- Teachers: 117.96 (2011-12) (on full-time equivalent (FTE) basis)
- Student–teacher ratio: 12.96 (2011-12)

Other information
- Website: Muleshoe ISD

Muleshoe Independent School District is a public school district based in Muleshoe, Texas (USA).

Located in Bailey County, a small portion of the district extends into Lamb County.

In 2009, the school district was rated "academically acceptable" by the Texas Education Agency.

== Schools ==
In the 2012-2013 school year, the district had students in five schools.

Regular instructional schools

- Muleshoe High School (Grades 9-12)
- Watson Junior High School (Grades 6-8)
- DeShazo Elementary School (Grades 3-5)
- Dillman Elementary School (Grades EE-2)

Alternative instructional schools

- P.E.P. (Grades 9-12)
