= Morton Independent School District =

School district in Texas

Coordinates: 33.7213°N 102.7671°W

Morton Independent School District is a public school district based in Morton, Texas, United States.

In 2009, the school district was rated "academically acceptable" by the Texas Education Agency.

== Schools ==
- Morton High School (grades 9-12)
- Morton Junior High School (grades 6-8)
- Morton Elementary School (grades prekindergarten-5)
