= Muleshoe, Texas =

- City
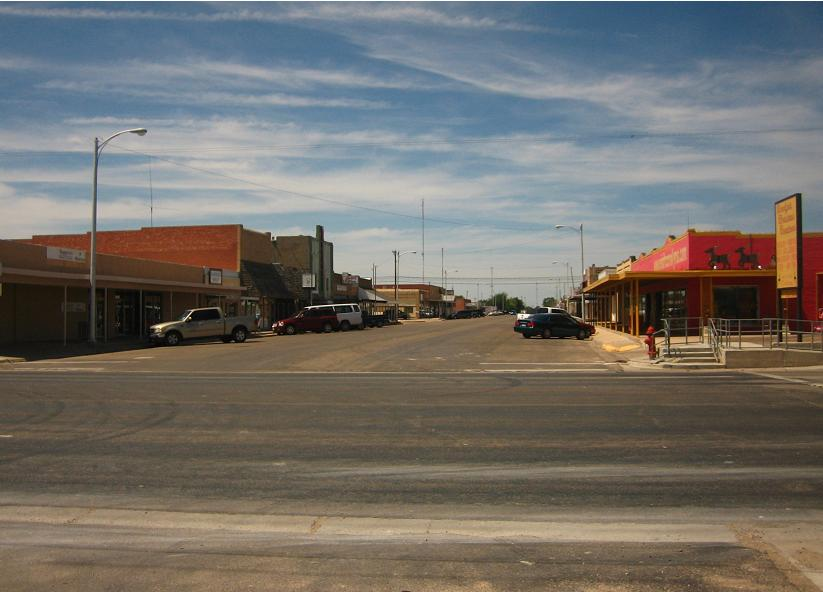
- Main Street in downtown Muleshoe

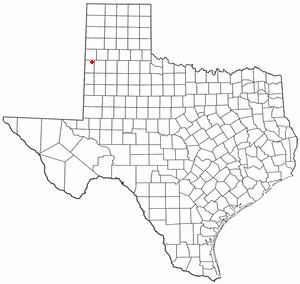
- Location of Muleshoe in Texas
- Coordinates: 34°13′35″N 102°43′25″W
- Country: United States
- State: Texas
- County: Bailey

Government
  - Mayor: Colt Ellis
  - City Manager: Ramon Sanchez
  - City Secretary: Zanea Carpenter
  - Police Chief: Gary R. McHone

Area
  - Total: 3.43 sq mi (8.89 km^{2})
  - Land: 3.43 sq mi (8.89 km^{2})
  - Water: 0 sq mi (0.00 km^{2})
- Elevation: 3,793 ft (1,156 m)

Population (2020)
  - Total: 5,160
  - Density: 1,503.3/sq mi (580.43/km^{2})
- Time zone: UTC-6 (CST)
  - Summer (DST): UTC-5 (CDT)
- ZIP code: 79347
- Area code: 806
- FIPS code: 48-49968
- GNIS feature ID: 1375067
- Website: City Website

Muleshoe is a city in Bailey County, Texas, United States. It was founded in 1913, when the Pecos and Northern Texas Railway built an 88-mile (142 km) line from Farwell, Texas, to Lubbock through northern Bailey County. In 1926, Muleshoe was incorporated. As of the 2020 census, Muleshoe had a population of 5,160. The county seat of Bailey County, it is home to the National Mule Memorial.

The Muleshoe Heritage Center commemorates the importance of ranching to West Texas.

== History ==
The name Muleshoe can be traced in the region to Henry Black, when he registered a brand on November 12, 1860. In 1877, Black purchased three houses on 40,000 acres (160 km^{2}) in Stephens County, naming it Muleshoe Ranch. Later, he built a large ranch house and a log schoolhouse, and established a small cemetery for family members. Muleshoe Ranch was supposedly named after the owner found a mule shoe in the soil.

On April 23, 1906, the Gulf, Santa Fe and Northwestern Railway Company and the Pecos and Northern Texas Railway Company merged (eventual successor BNSF Railway) and were chartered to construct a railway between Lubbock and Farwell on the New Mexico border. From 1901 to 1915, communities along the future railway contributed hundreds of thousands of dollars to its construction. Muleshoe was founded in 1913 when the Pecos and Northern Texas Railway laid rails across northern Bailey County; residents borrowed the name from the nearby Muleshoe Ranch.

Soon after the railroad passed through Muleshoe, the town expanded rapidly. In 1917, Muleshoe became the county seat after the county was organized, but it was not incorporated until 1926. Muleshoe continued to grow quickly, and by 1930, 800 residents were in the town. Three decades later, Muleshoe had tripled in population to 3,871. In 1970, Muleshoe reached its pinnacle at over 5,000 residents, 200 businesses, two hospitals, two banks, a library, a newspaper, and a radio station.

During the 1970s and 1980s the population stagnated, and by the 1990s Muleshoe's population had begun to decrease. The population went from 5,048 in 1988 to 4,530 in 2000. The once lively and vibrant Main Street is now quiet, with many abandoned buildings. Many of the businesses that once called Main Street home are now on American Boulevard (US Highway 84/70).

During the early 1960s, Texas residents were eager to build a memorial to the mule for its strength and sparse eating habits, traits that endeared it to the pioneers. In war, the mule carried cannon; in peace, it hauled freight. Its small hooves allowed it to scale rocky areas. The Mule Memorial was first displayed on July 4, 1965, near the intersection of US 70/84. Muleshoe is the home of the world's largest mule shoe, at the Muleshoe Heritage Center.

In January 2024, a Russian hacktivist group hacked the town's water supply, causing flooding.

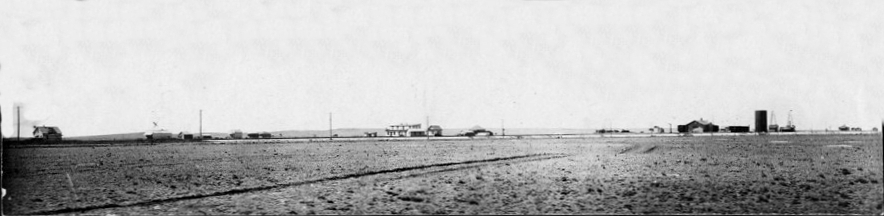
Muleshoe, c. 1914–1915

== Geography ==
According to the United States Census Bureau, the city has a total area of 3.4 square miles (8.8 km^{2}), all of it land.

Muleshoe is situated on the South Plains, in a region known as the Llano Estacado.

=== Climate ===
Muleshoe is in an area considered part of the semiarid steppe climate zone that extends from areas of central Mexico to southern Alberta and Saskatchewan in Canada. The semiarid steppe classification identifies areas that are intermediate between desert zones and humid zones. This West Texas town experiences hot summer days and cool summer nights and cool to warm winter days and harsh, cold winter nights. Rainfall is low; the town and vicinity receive less than 18 inches (460 mm) of rainfall annually. High summer temperatures (average July temperature above 90 °F) precipitation moisture is rapidly lost to evaporation. Muleshoe experiences steady, and sometimes intense, winds from the north and west in the fall and winter, and winds from the south or west in the spring and summer. The winds add a considerable wind chill factor in the winter.

Climate data for Muleshoe, Texas (1991–2020 normals, extremes 1927–present)
Month	Jan	Feb	Mar	Apr	May	Jun	Jul	Aug	Sep	Oct	Nov	Dec	Year
Record high °F (°C)	81 (27)	86 (30)	100 (38)	99 (37)	103 (39)	109 (43)	110 (43)	110 (43)	106 (41)	97 (36)	89 (32)	81 (27)	110 (43)
Mean daily maximum °F (°C)	53.1 (11.7)	57.7 (14.3)	65.6 (18.7)	73.7 (23.2)	81.5 (27.5)	90.3 (32.4)	91.6 (33.1)	90.0 (32.2)	83.3 (28.5)	73.8 (23.2)	62.1 (16.7)	53.5 (11.9)	73.0 (22.8)
Daily mean °F (°C)	36.5 (2.5)	40.4 (4.7)	47.8 (8.8)	55.6 (13.1)	64.9 (18.3)	74.5 (23.6)	77.1 (25.1)	75.6 (24.2)	68.4 (20.2)	57.2 (14.0)	45.0 (7.2)	37.4 (3.0)	56.7 (13.7)
Mean daily minimum °F (°C)	20.0 (−6.7)	23.1 (−4.9)	30.0 (−1.1)	37.5 (3.1)	48.2 (9.0)	58.7 (14.8)	62.6 (17.0)	61.2 (16.2)	53.5 (11.9)	40.5 (4.7)	27.9 (−2.3)	21.2 (−6.0)	40.4 (4.7)
Record low °F (°C)	−14 (−26)	−21 (−29)	1 (−17)	11 (−12)	21 (−6)	40 (4)	48 (9)	41 (5)	28 (−2)	10 (−12)	−1 (−18)	−9 (−23)	−21 (−29)
Average precipitation inches (mm)	0.54 (14)	0.53 (13)	1.01 (26)	0.90 (23)	1.84 (47)	2.77 (70)	2.46 (62)	2.83 (72)	2.37 (60)	1.79 (45)	0.62 (16)	0.66 (17)	18.32 (465)
Average snowfall inches (cm)	1.6 (4.1)	1.5 (3.8)	0.7 (1.8)	0.0 (0.0)	0.0 (0.0)	0.0 (0.0)	0.0 (0.0)	0.0 (0.0)	0.0 (0.0)	0.3 (0.76)	1.3 (3.3)	2.1 (5.3)	7.5 (19)
Average precipitation days (≥ 0.01 in)	2.6	2.6	3.7	3.9	5.5	6.3	6.7	7.3	5.6	4.3	2.9	2.9	54.3
Average snowy days (≥ 0.1 in)	0.9	0.8	0.6	0.1	0.0	0.0	0.0	0.0	0.0	0.1	0.6	1.2	4.3
Source: NOAA

== Demographics ==
Historical population
Census	Pop.	Note	%±
1930	779		—
1940	1,327		70.3%
1950	2,477		86.7%
1960	3,871		56.3%
1970	4,525		16.9%
1980	4,842		7.0%
1990	4,571		−5.6%
2000	4,530		−0.9%
2010	5,158		13.9%
2020	5,160		0.0%
U.S. Decennial Census

=== 2020 census ===
As of the 2020 census, there were 5,160 people, 1,728 households, and 1,071 families residing in the city. The median age was 32.1 years. 30.0% of residents were under the age of 18 and 13.9% of residents were 65 years of age or older. For every 100 females there were 105.9 males, and for every 100 females age 18 and over there were 102.7 males age 18 and over.

99.2% of residents lived in urban areas, while 0.8% lived in rural areas.

Of the 1,728 households, 40.7% had children under the age of 18 living in them. Of all households, 49.8% were married-couple households, 18.3% were households with a male householder and no spouse or partner present, and 24.8% were households with a female householder and no spouse or partner present. About 21.6% of all households were made up of individuals and 10.9% had someone living alone who was 65 years of age or older.

There were 1,943 housing units, of which 11.1% were vacant. The homeowner vacancy rate was 1.7% and the rental vacancy rate was 7.5%.

Racial composition as of the 2020 census
Race	Number	Percent
White	2,229	43.2%
Black or African American	56	1.1%
American Indian and Alaska Native	62	1.2%
Asian	11	0.2%
Native Hawaiian and Other Pacific Islander	0	0.0%
Some other race	1,727	33.5%
Two or more races	1,075	20.8%
Hispanic or Latino (of any race)	3,706	71.8%

=== 2010 census ===
As of the census of 2010, 5,158 people, 1,595 households, and 1,178 families resided in the town. The population density was 1,323.9 inhabitants per square mile (511.2/km^{2}). The 1,802 housing units averaged 526.6 per square mile (203.4/km^{2}). The racial makeup of the city was 63.27% White, 1.50% African American, 0.64% Native American, 0.20% Asian, 31.59% from other races, and 2.80% from two or more races. Hispanics or Latinos of any race were 53.33% of the population.

Of the 1595 households, 38.6% had children under the age of 18 living with them, 61.3% were married couples living together, 8.8% had a female householder with no husband present, and 26.1% were not families. About 24.1% of all households were made up of individuals, and 14.5% had someone living alone who was 65 years of age or older. The average household size was 2.80 and the average family size was 3.35.

In the city, the population was distributed as 31.3% under 18, 9.1% from 18 to 24, 25.1% from 25 to 44, 19.8% from 45 to 64, and 14.6% who were 65 or older. The median age was 33 years. For every 100 females, there were 92.8 males. For every 100 females age 18 and over, there were 90.8 males.

The median income for a household in the city was $25,519, and for a family was $31,969. Males had a median income of $23,409 and females a median income $16,053. The per capita income for the city was $12,567. In 2007, the median house value was $48,748, and the average house value $66,525. In 2008, the cost-of-living index in Muleshoe was 73.3 as compared to the U.S. average of 100. About 13.4% of families and 18.0% of the population were below the poverty line, including 21.9% of those under age 18 and 13.6% of those age 65 or over.

== Arts and culture ==
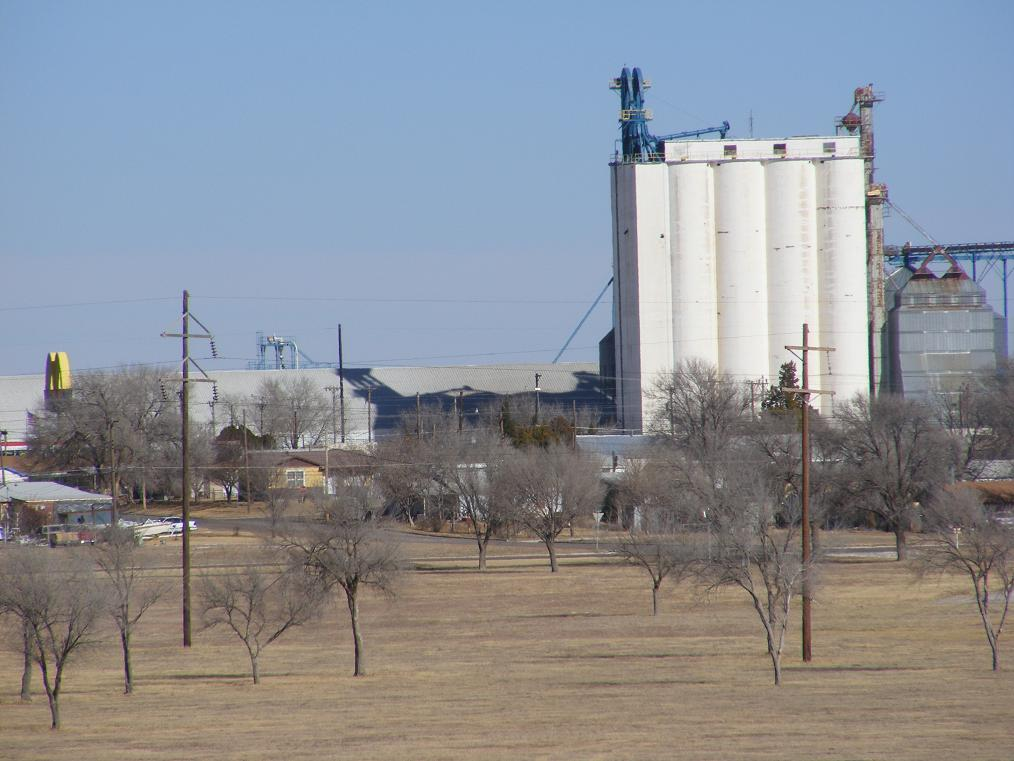
Muleshoe City Park, with grain elevator in background

Muleshoe hosted the annual Tour de Muleshoe bicycle ride, a local competition which features 100K, 40-mile (64 km), and 10-mile (16 km) bike tours last raced in 2015.

Sites in Muleshoe include:

- A USArray Transportable Array seismic station, part of the Earthscope project.
- The world's largest mule shoe, measuring 22 feet (6.7 m) long and 17 feet (5.2 m) wide.
- The national mule memorial, Ol' Pete, which was invited to and attended President George W. Bush's first inauguration in 2001.

== Parks and recreation ==
In 2010, Muleshoe opened a $1.8 million water park in New City Park. The park also features soccer and softball fields, a playground, fishing pond, and basketball courts.

== Education ==
Muleshoe is served by the Muleshoe Independent School District. Schools include:

- Muleshoe High School (grades 9–12)
- Watson Junior High School (grades 6–8)
- Mary DeShazo Elementary School (grades 3–5)
- Neal B. Dillman Elementary School (grades Pre-K–2)

A branch of South Plains College provides classes for students aspiring to become licensed vocational nurses.

== Notable people ==
- Lee Horsley, actor, was born in Muleshoe on May 15, 1955. He played the fictional detective Matt Houston on an ABC series of the same name and later starred in the CBS Western Paradise
- Lincoln Riley, head coach of the University of Southern California football team, is a former Muleshoe High School quarterback. He is the older brother of Garrett Riley
- Garrett Riley, offensive analyst for the University of Missouri football team, is a former Muleshoe High School Athlete. He is the younger brother of Lincoln Riley
- Allan Weisbecker, writer and surfer, lived briefly in Muleshoe during the late 1990s
- Kevin D. Williamson, pundit and a native of the Texas Panhandle, often uses Muleshoe as a metaphor for American culture in his columns
