= Sudan Independent School District =

School district in Texas

Sudan Independent School District is a public school district based in Sudan, Texas (USA). The district includes portions of three counties – Lamb, Bailey, and Cochran. Sudan ISD has two campuses - Sudan High (Grades 8–12) and Sudan Elementary (Grades K-7). In 2009, the school district was rated "recognized" by the Texas Education Agency.

On July 1, 2002, Three Way Independent School District consolidated into Sudan ISD.
