= List of National Natural Landmarks in Texas =

There are 21 National Natural Landmarks in Texas.

Texas National Natural Landmarks (clickable map)

Name	Image	Date	Location	County	Ownership	Description
Attwater Prairie Chicken Preserve		1968	29°40′08″N 96°16′00″W	Colorado	federal/US Fish & Wildlife Service	Contains the only significant segment of gulf coastal prairie.
Bayside Resaca Area		1980	26°13′45″N 97°20′50″W	Cameron	federal/US Fish & Wildlife Service	Located in Laguna Atascosa National Wildlife Refuge, contains an excellent example of a resaca.
Catfish Creek		1983	31°54′27″N 95°54′09″W	Anderson	state/Texas Department of Parks and Wildlife	One of the few remaining undisturbed riparian habitats in the western Gulf Coastal Plain
Caverns of Sonora		1965	30°33′18″N 100°48′44″W	Sutton	private	Contains unusual formations, such as bladed helictites and coralloid growths
Devil's Sinkhole		1972	30°00′57″N 100°12′31″W	Edwards	state/Texas Department of Parks and Wildlife	A deep, bell-shaped, collapsed limestone sink.
Dinosaur Valley State Park	Dinosaur Valley State Park	1968	32°14′46″N 97°48′48″W	Somervell	state/Texas Department of Parks and Wildlife	The only known source of distinct and full-grown sauropod footprints.
Ezell's Cave		1971		Hays	private	Houses at least 36 species of cave fauna.
Enchanted Rock	Enchanted Rock	1971	30°29′46″N 98°49′12″W	Gillespie, Llano	state/Texas Department of Parks and Wildlife	A classic illustration of a batholith and of the exfoliation process.
Fort Worth Nature Center and Refuge		1980	32°50′36″N 97°28′38″W	Tarrant	municipal/City of Fort Worth	Contains outstanding examples of the unique oak-hickory forest associations called cross timbers.
Greenwood Canyon		1975		Montague	private	A rich source of early Cretaceous mammalian fossils.
High Plains Natural Area	Buffalo Lake NWR	1980	34°55′10″N 102°06′40″W	Randall	federal/US Fish & Wildlife Service	One of the best developed, least disturbed natural shortgrass climax communities remaining in the Great Plains. Part of Buffalo Lake National Wildlife Refuge.
Independence Creek Preserve		2024		Terrell	private	
Little Blanco River Bluff		1982		Blanco	private	An unspoiled example of the limestone bluff communities of the Edwards Plateau.
Longhorn Cavern	Longhorn Cavern	1971	30°41′04″N 98°21′03″W	Burnet	state/Texas Department of Parks and Wildlife	State park contains an outstanding example of cave features formed during the phreatic phase of development.
Lost Maples State Natural Area	Lost Maples State Natural Area	1980	29°48′28″N 99°34′15″W	Bandera, Real	state/Texas Department of Parks and Wildlife	An excellent illustration of Edwards Plateau flora and fauna.
Muleshoe National Wildlife Refuge	Sandhill cranes at Muleshoe NWR	1980	33°57′19″N 102°46′37″W	Bailey	federal/US Fish & Wildlife Service	Saline lake beds, and shortgrass grama grasslands characteristic of the high plains.
Odessa Meteor Crater	Odessa Meteor Crater	1965	31°45′25″N 102°28′45″W	Ector	county	Contains two meteorite impact craters. The largest is 550 feet (170 m) in diameter.
Palo Duro Canyon State Park	Lighthouse formation	1976	34°59′05″N 101°42′07″W	Armstrong, Randall	state/Texas Department of Parks and Wildlife	Spectacular canyon that is an excellent example of a landform created by running water.
Santa Ana National Wildlife Refuge	Wildlife at Santa Anna	1966	26°05′07″N 98°08′04″W	Hidalgo	federal/US Fish & Wildlife Service	A living museum of the lowland forested area of the Lower Rio Grande Valley.
Natural Bridge Caverns	Natural Bridge Caverns	1971	29°41′32″N 98°20′34″W	Comal	private	A multilevel cavern system containing unusual speleothems and intricate helictites.
Cave Without a Name	Cave Without a Name speleothems	2009	29°52′45″N 98°38′31″W	Kendall	private	Contains rare and nationally outstanding examples of speleothems.

== See also ==
- List of National Historic Landmarks in Texas
