= Wyman Meinzer =

American photographer

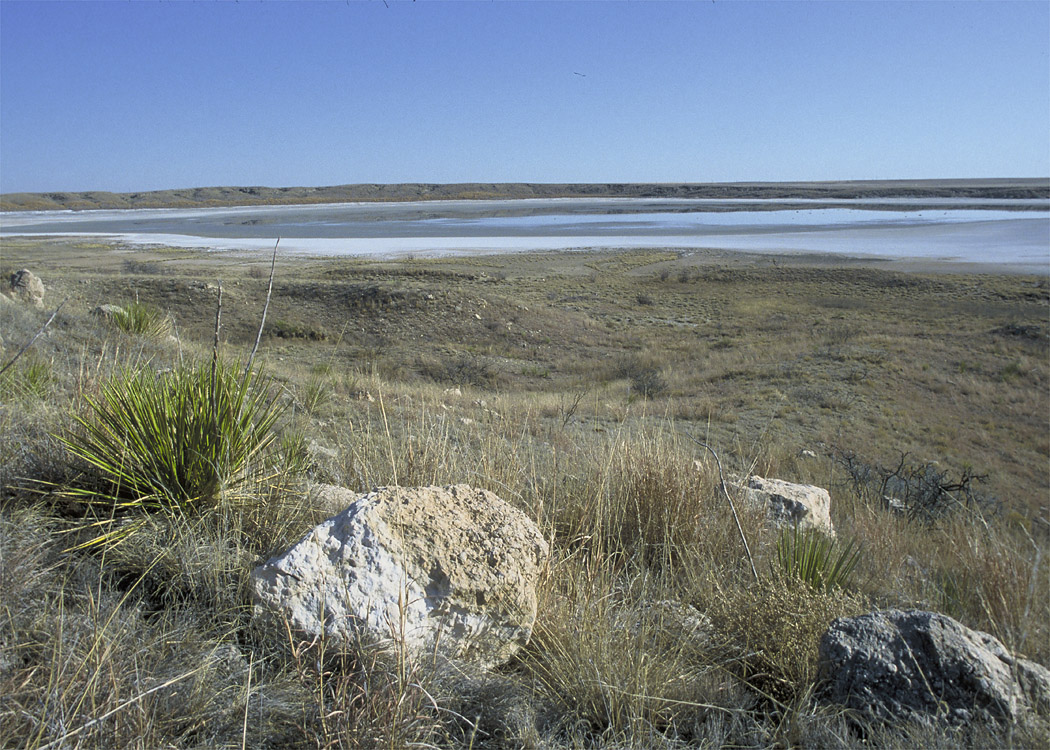
Goose Lake at Muleshoe National Wildlife Refuge(NWR)

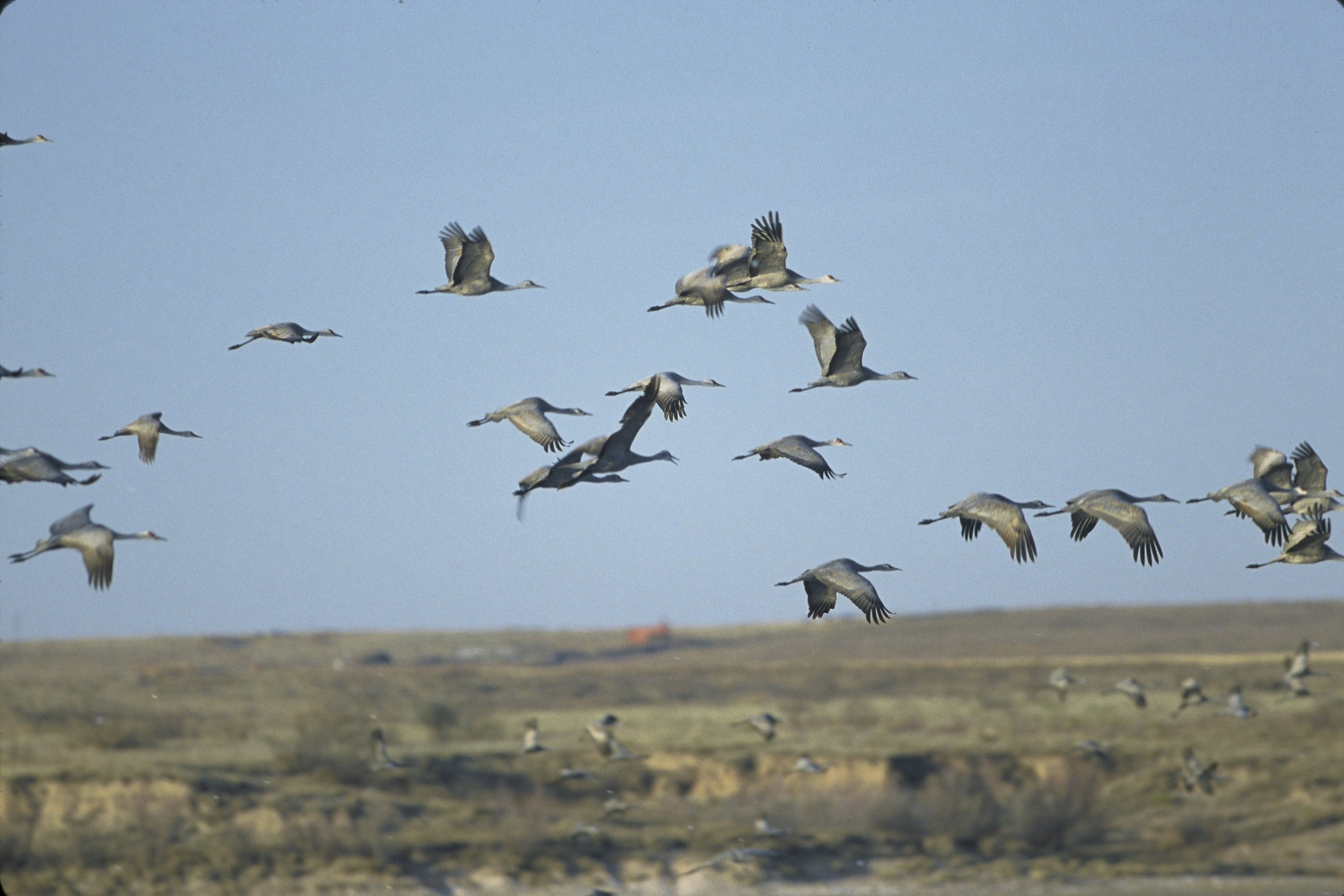
Sandhill cranes at Muleshoe NWR

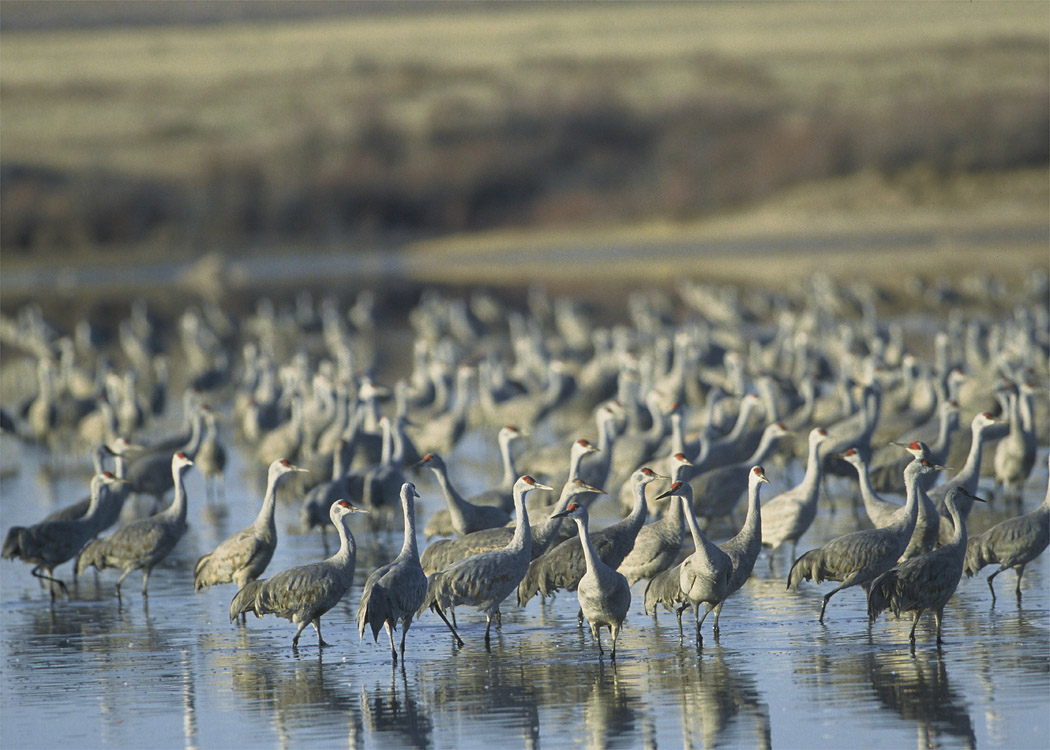
Sandhill Cranes at Muleshoe National Wildlife Refuge

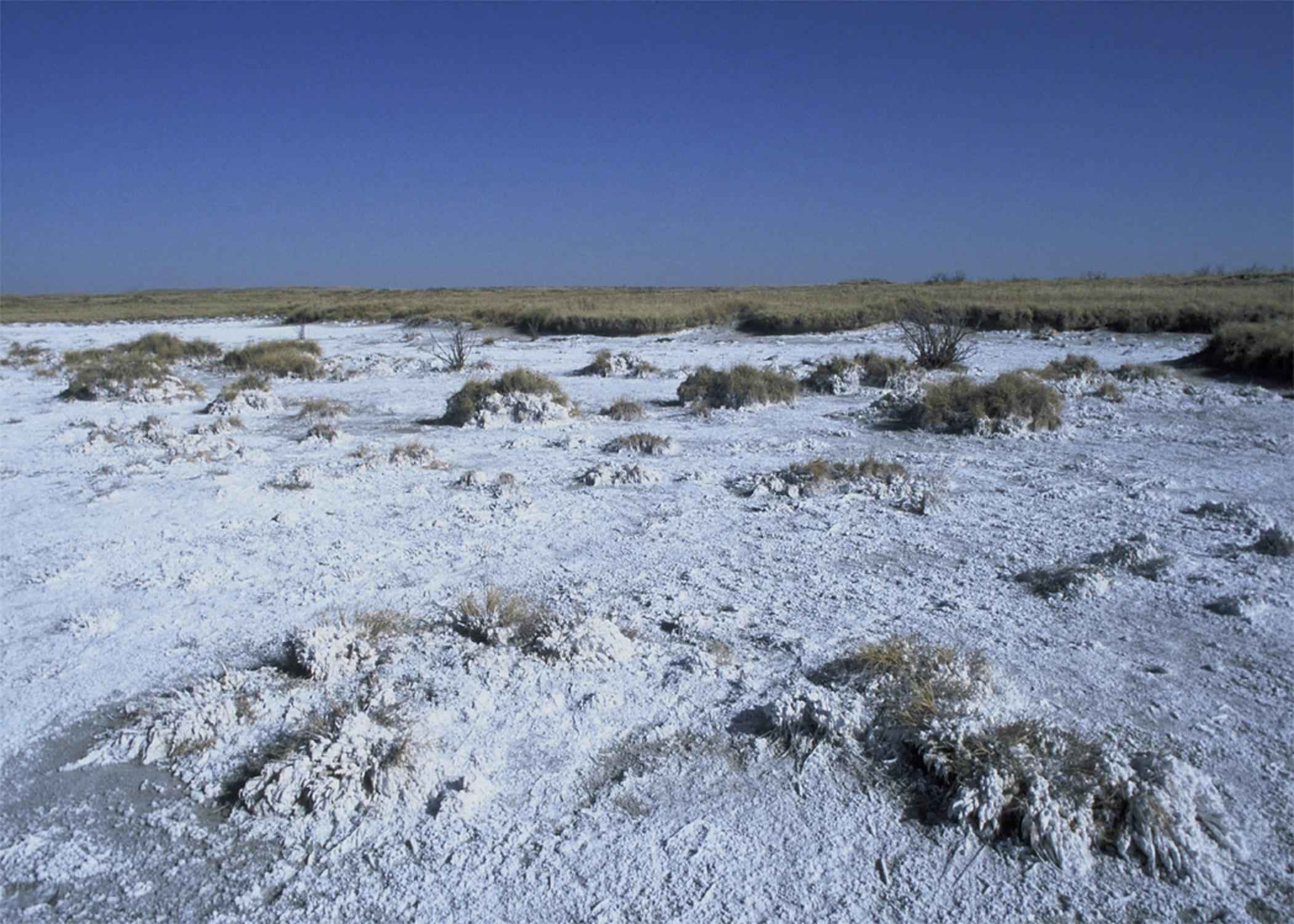
Dry yellow grass covered in winter snow

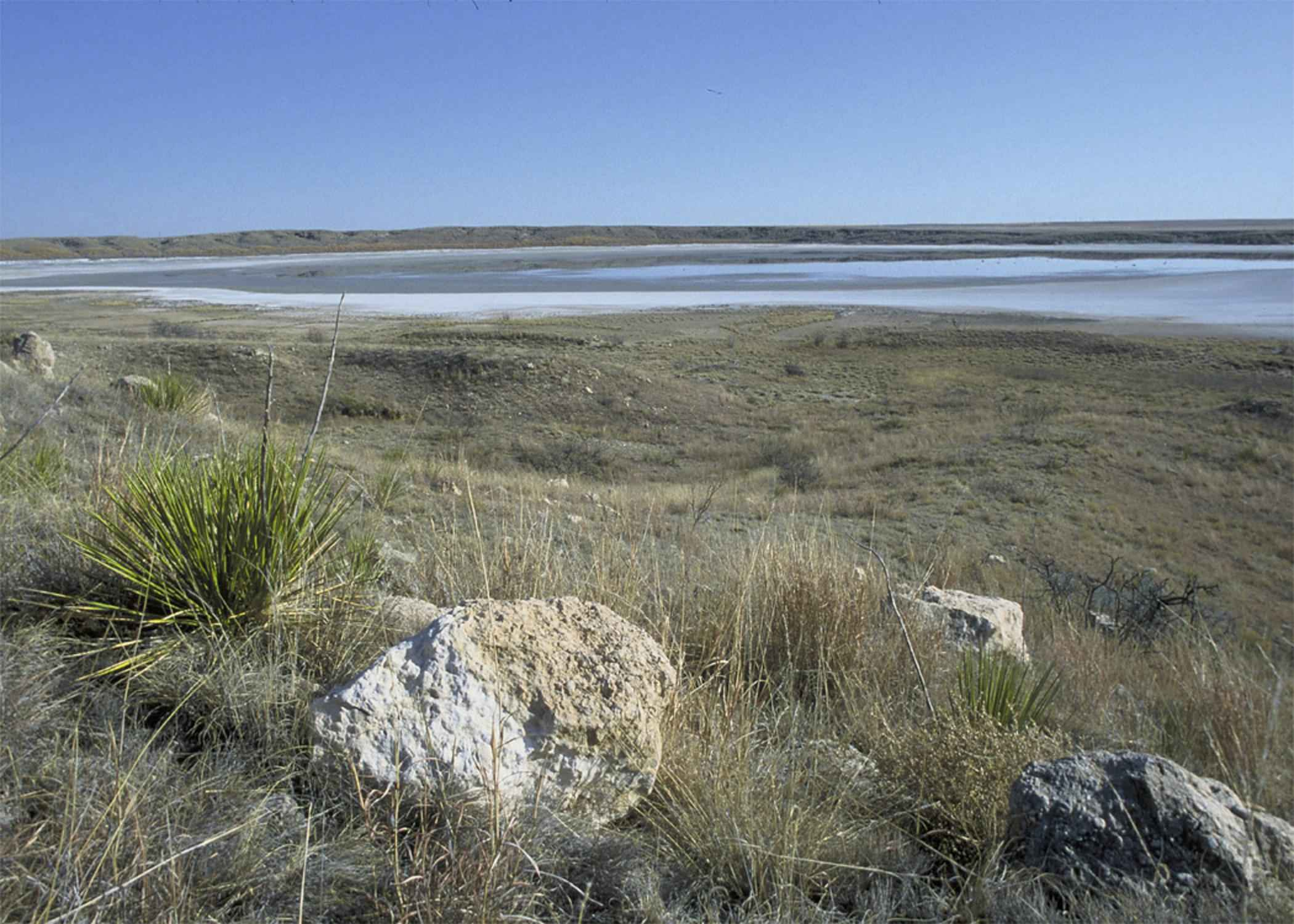
Muleshoe National Wildlife Refuge

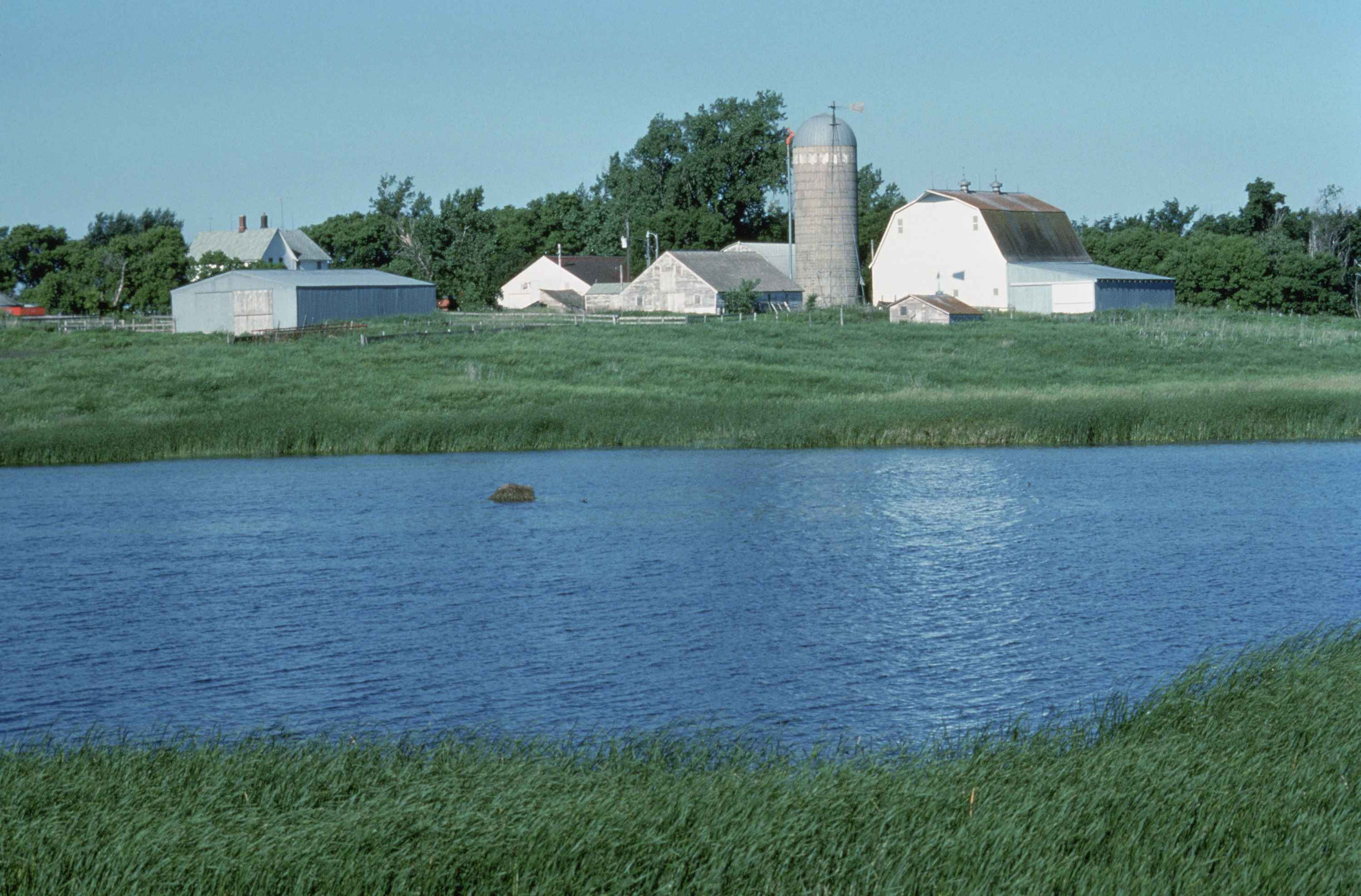
Ranch surrounded by swamp

Wyman P. Meinzer is a photographer from Benjamin, Texas. In a review of 'Texas Lost', The Dallas Morning News said Meinzer "just might be the best nature photographer in Texas. He has had more than 250 magazine cover photos published. He also has 17 photography books published. George W. Bush named him state photographer of Texas in 1997. As of 1997, Meinzer taught photography at Texas Tech and hunted coyotes and bobcats in the winter months. Meinzer's photos illustrate Texas Past: Enduring Legacy (Texas Parks and Wildlife Press) written by Andrew Sansom.

== Selected bibliography ==
- 6666: Portrait of a Texas Ranch
- Texas Rivers
- Canyons of the Texas High Plains
- Between Heaven and Texas
- Between Heaven and Texas
- Coyotes in the Rolling Plains of Texas
- Photographing Coyotes (1995)
- The Coyote in Southwestern Folklore

== Other work ==
- Meinzer, Wyman (1993). "Beep! Beep! Better pull over, folks – it's the roadrunner". Smithsonian 23: 58.Meinzer, Wyman (1993). "Beep! Beep! Better pull over, folks – it's the roadrunner". Smithsonian. 23: 58.
- Coy F. Harris (ed.), Windmill Tales, Wyman Meinzer, Texas Tech Press
- Graves, John; Wyman Meinzer (2002). Texas Rivers. University of Texas Press. p. 79. ISBN 978-0-292-70198-4.

== Further viewing ==
- Wyman Meinzer; Texas State Photographer
