= Buffalo Lake National Wildlife Refuge =

National Wildlife Refuge near Canyon, Texas

Buffalo Lake
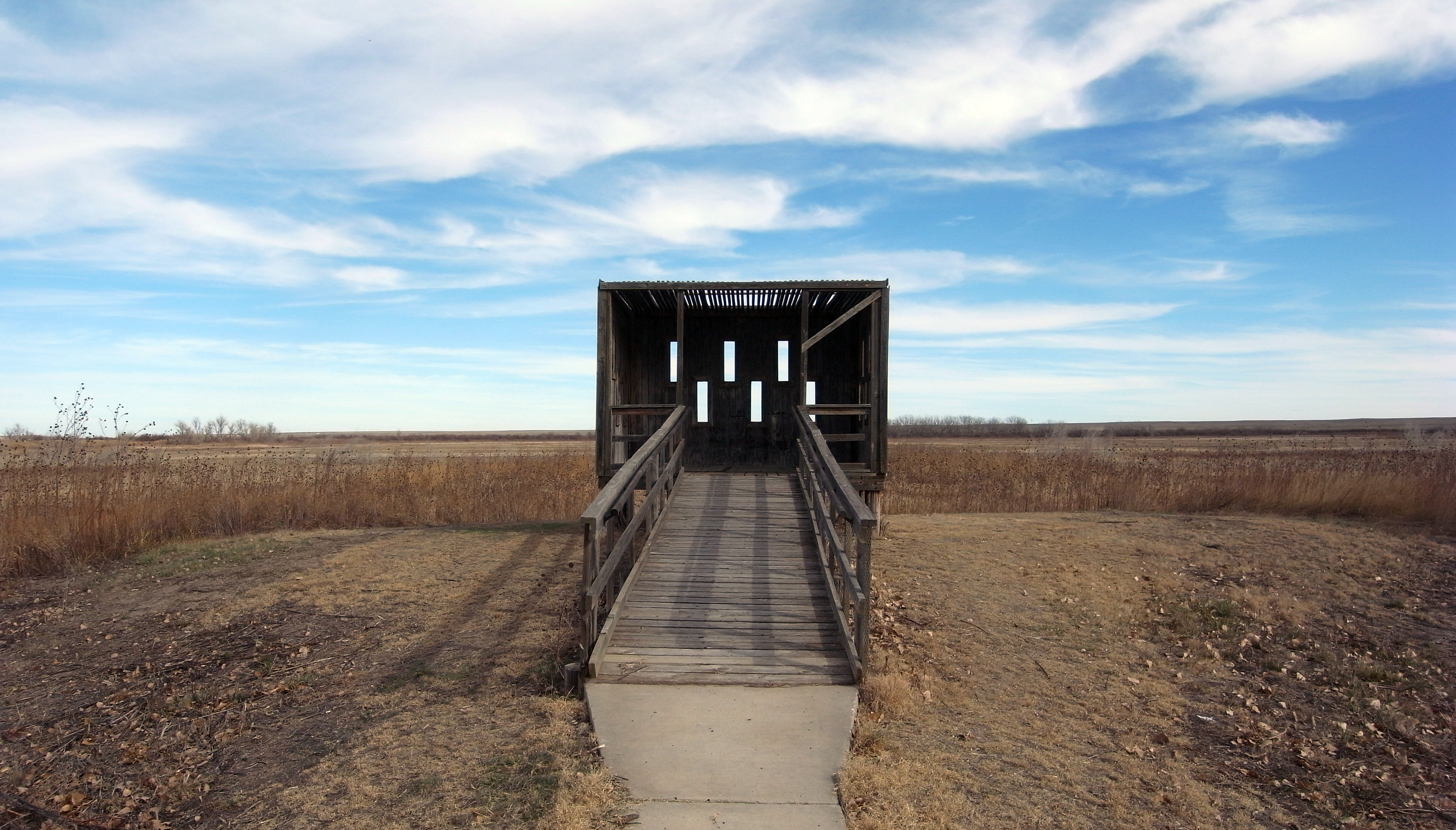
- Blind for wildlife viewing at Buffalo Lake NWR

- Location within Texas
- Location: Randall County, Texas, United States
- Nearest city: Canyon, Texas
- Coordinates: 34°53′11″N 102°07′11″W
- Area: 31 km^{2} (12 sq mi)
- Elevation: 1,140 m (3,740 ft)
- Established: National Wildlife Refuge
- Operator: U.S. Fish and Wildlife Service
- Website: Buffalo Lake National Wildlife Refuge

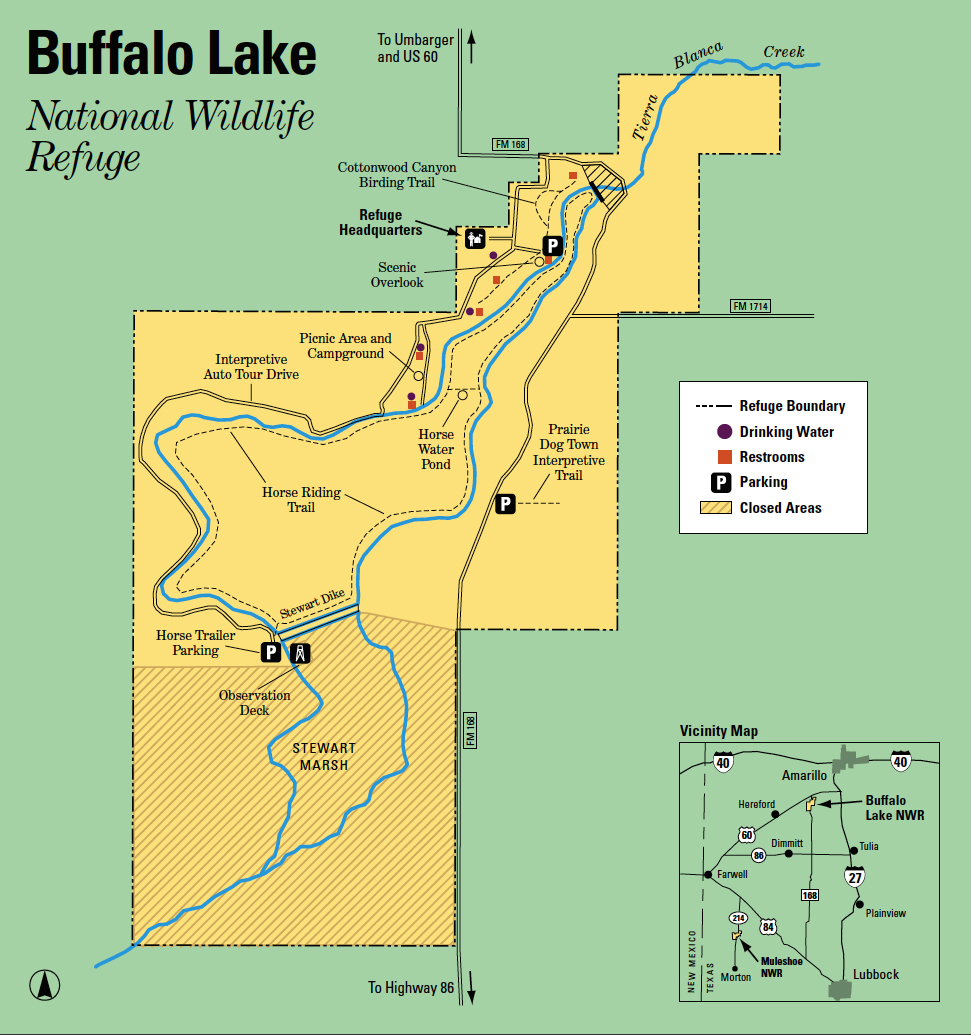

Buffalo Lake National Wildlife Refuge is a protected area in Randall County in the Texas Panhandle. Its shortgrass prairies spill into marshes, woodlands, riparian habitat, croplands, and water-carved canyon walls that together form 7,664 acres (31.02 km^{2}) of homes for migratory and year-round wildlife. The area forms a habitat for black-tailed prairie dogs and burrowing owls, among many other species. Some 175 acres (0.71 km^{2}) of the refuge carries the designation of National Natural Landmark.

Buffalo Lake NWR lies within a canyon carved by Tierra Blanca Creek, an ephemeral stream that stretches across northern portions of the Llano Estacado. The discharge of this stream is highly variable, and it is not unusual for the creek to dry out completely. At the same time, as the sole creek bed within a large drainage basin in a region prone to frequent and intense thunderstorms, it often suffers the destructive effects of flash floods. A large flood control structure, called Umbarger Dam, was constructed to impound the waters of Tierra Blanca Creek and form Buffalo Lake within the boundaries of the wildlife refuge. The ponded waters of this shallow lake can provide key roosting habitat for migrating birds.

== See also ==
- Grulla National Wildlife Refuge
- Muleshoe National Wildlife Refuge
- Rita Blanca National Grassland
- Palo Duro Canyon
- Caprock Canyons State Park and Trailway
- McKittrick Canyon
