= Andrew Sansom =

American conservationist, academic, government administrator

Andrew Sansom (born 1945) is an American conservationist, academic, author, and former government administrator whose career has focused on conservation of natural resources, parks, wildlife, environmental education, and water in Texas. He has also written extensively about Texas conservation and environmental history.

Sansom served as executive director of the Texas chapter of The Nature Conservancy from 1982 to 1987 and was executive director of Texas Parks and Wildlife Department from 1990 to 2001. He later established and directed the River Systems Institute at Texas State University, which became the Meadows Center for Water and the Environment.

During his career Sansom helped to acquire and protect hundreds of thousands of acres of land in Texas. His work has led to the acquisition of Big Bend Ranch State Park and the conservation of land that became part of Big Bend National Park. A 2024 biography by Laura Raun characterized him as a major figure in the history of Texas conservation.

== Early life and education ==
Sansom was born in 1945 and grew up in Lake Jackson, Texas, in Brazoria County. His father, a Navy veteran, worked for Dow Chemical as a research chemist and patent attorney, while his mother was a teacher. As a child, Sansom spent considerable time fishing, swimming, hunting, exploring the outdoors, and participating in scouting. His family's visits to natural and historic sites contributed to his early interest in outdoor recreation and conservation. After graduating from Brazosport High School in 1964, Sansom initially attended Austin College in Sherman, Texas.

While at Austin College he had doubts about the usefulness of the curriculum. When he learned that Texas Tech University had a program on wildlife and outdoor recreation management, he transferred to Texas Tech University, where he studied parks and recreation administration, graduating cum laude in 1969.

== Early career ==
After graduating from Texas Tech, Sansom joined the National Recreation and Park Association in Washington, D.C., where he served as executive secretary of its student branch. In 1970 he attended the White House Conference on Youth in Estes Park, Colorado. Following the conference, he became a special assistant to United States Secretary of the Interior Rogers Morton.

In 1974, Sansom became director of conservation education at the Federal Energy Administration, where he was responsibile for the agency's "Don't be Fuelish" campaign. After the change in presidential administrations in 1976, he returned to Texas and became deputy director of the Energy Institute at the University of Houston. Some of his projects were on passive solar technology and energy efficiency.

In 1979, Sansom entered the private sector as vice president for development of the Old River Company, a consortium planning an offshore bulk-liquids terminal near Freeport, Texas. His responsibilities included environmental affairs, public affairs, and marketing. The project was ultimately abandoned amid changes in energy markets and economics.

In 1974 Sansom worked with elected officials and environmental leaders in Texas to create the Big Thicket National Preserve. Later he was instrumental in initiating the transformation of Matagorda Island from a military training ground to a wildlife refuge.

Sansom was involved in protecting whooping cranes on the Texas coast. His first efforts began in 1972 while working for the Interior Secretary. When he leaked his findings from a study of cranes on Matagorda Island to the media the story was covered by CBS’ “60 Minutes”. Reportedly this led to his termination.

In 1994 he tried again and when Texas Parks and Wildlife combined the state's natural area with the federal government's Matagorda Island National Wildlife Refuge it accomplished his objective: a refuge for the whopping cranes.

Sansom accelerated the use of land trusts in Texas in the 1980s after the federal Highway Beautification Act, championed by Lady Bird Johnson had created “scenic easements”. These could be used to achieve conservation objectives and were legally enabled by land trusts.

== The Nature Conservancy ==
In 1982, Sansom became executive director of the Texas chapter of The Nature Conservancy, which sought to protect ecologically significant lands through acquisition and conservation agreements. While Sansom led The Nature Conservancy approximately 300,000 acres of land were protected.

Among the conservation projects associated with Sansom during this period were the protection of Honey Creek, coastal wetlands, and portions of the Blackland Prairie. He also helped arrange the transfer of approximately 57,000 acres of West Texas land to the National Park Service, contributing to the expansion of Big Bend National Park.

Sansom encouraged negotiations among government agencies, private landowners, conservation organizations, and other interests. His career was marked by the use of land transactions and partnerships to achieve conservation objectives in a state where private property interests play a significant role in public policy.

== Texas Parks and Wildlife Department ==
Sansom joined the Texas Parks and Wildlife Department in 1987 as coordinator of land acquisition and management. In 1988, he became head of acquisitions. One of his principal accomplishments in that position was brokering the purchase of Big Bend Ranch State Park in West Texas. The acquisition substantially expanded the state's park holdings.

In 1990, Sansom became executive director of TPWD. He held the position for 11 years, overseeing an agency responsible for state parks, wildlife management, fisheries, hunting and fishing regulation, and conservation programs. His tenure followed a period of political and administrative controversy within the agency. Sansom reorganized the department, modernized administrative systems, and sought to diversify its funding sources.

During his tenure, TPWD expanded programs involving conservation education, youth participation in outdoor activities, wildlife management, and public access to parks. The department also developed new facilities and programs, including the Texas Sea Center in Lake Jackson and the Texas Freshwater Fisheries Center in Athens.

Sansom helped establish the Parks and Wildlife Foundation of Texas, which sought private sector financial support for TPWD programs. He also promoted the Texas Wildlife Expo, urban wildlife and outdoor programs, the World Birding Center in the Rio Grande Valley, and the Texas Birding Classic. Under his leadership the TPWF expanded technical assistance available to private landowners for wildlife and habitat management.

His administration was reduced the department's reliance on general state tax revenues by increasing revenue from sources associated with use of parks and wildlife resources. TPWD also undertook a major program to address deferred maintenance in the state park system during his tenure.

Sansom promoted partnerships between TPWD and private landowners. His administration supported legislation intended to encourage landowners to make property available for public recreational use and to provide incentives for wildlife-oriented habitat management.

Sansom retired as TPWD executive director in 2001. Contemporary assessments of his tenure by the state's press, outdoor sports writers, and constituents praised his management of the agency.

== Water conservation and Texas State University ==
Following his retirement from TPWD, Sansom turned to water conservation. He established and directed the River Systems Institute at Texas State University in San Marcos. The institute subsequently became the Meadows Center for Water and the Environment. It focuses on water resources, river systems, environmental research, and public education.

In 1994, Texas State University acquired Spring Lake, the site of the former Aquarena Springs amusement park. Sansom helped develop a partnership between the university and TPWD to transform the site into an environmental education center. In 2002, he accepted an invitation from university president Jerry Supple to direct the River Systems Institute.

At the Meadows Center, Sansom promoted research into environmental flows, the water that passes through river, and streams to bays and estuaries and is a critical part of the ecosystem. He also expanded environmental education programs and supported the Texas Stream Team, a community-science program in which volunteers collect and report water-quality data.

Sansom earned a doctorate in Geographic Education from Texas State University. His dissertation examined the effects of the Meadows Center's environmental education programs on students and teachers and investigated the influence of the university's river and springs environment on students' decisions to attend Texas State.

Sansom stepped down as director of the Meadows Center in 2020 and was succeeded by hydrologist Robert Mace. As of 2026, Sansom was described as mostly retired by journalist Robyn Ross, although he continued teaching a conservation leadership course at Texas State University.

== Writing and publications ==
Sansom has written extensively about the natural and cultural resources of Texas. His books include Texas Lost (1995), which examined threatened natural areas and conservation efforts, and Texas Past (1997), which focused on historic sites and the state's cultural heritage. He collaborated with photographer Wyman Meinzer on the books.

His work appeared in many publications including Texas Monthly, The Texas Observer, Houston City Magazine, Politics Today, Texas Highways, and Texas Parks and Wildlife.

== Conservation organizations and public service ==
Sansom has served in voluntary positions with numerous nonprofit and civic organizations. These included the Brazoria County Parks Board, the Texas Historical Foundation, Bat Conservation International, and KLRU Public Television in Austin. He also founded the Cradle of Texas Conservancy.

== Awards and recognition ==
Sansom's contributions to conservation have earned him numerous honors throughout his career. In 1993 he received the Pugsley Medal from the American Academy for Park and Recreation Administration. The award recognized his contributions to conservation and park administration.

In 2024 he was the subject of Laura Raun's biography Andrew Sansom: A Life in Conservation, published by Texas A&M University Press. Raun described him as the "Teddy Roosevelt of Texas," a comparison based on his role in protecting large areas of Texas land.

== Legacy ==
Texas State University's Hillviews magazine described Sansom as a major figure in the development of modern conservation efforts in Texas, while his 2024 biography emphasizes the more than 500,000 acres of parks, preserves, and wildlife-management areas associated with his conservation work.
