= Grulla National Wildlife Refuge =

National Wildlife Refuge near Portales, New Mexico

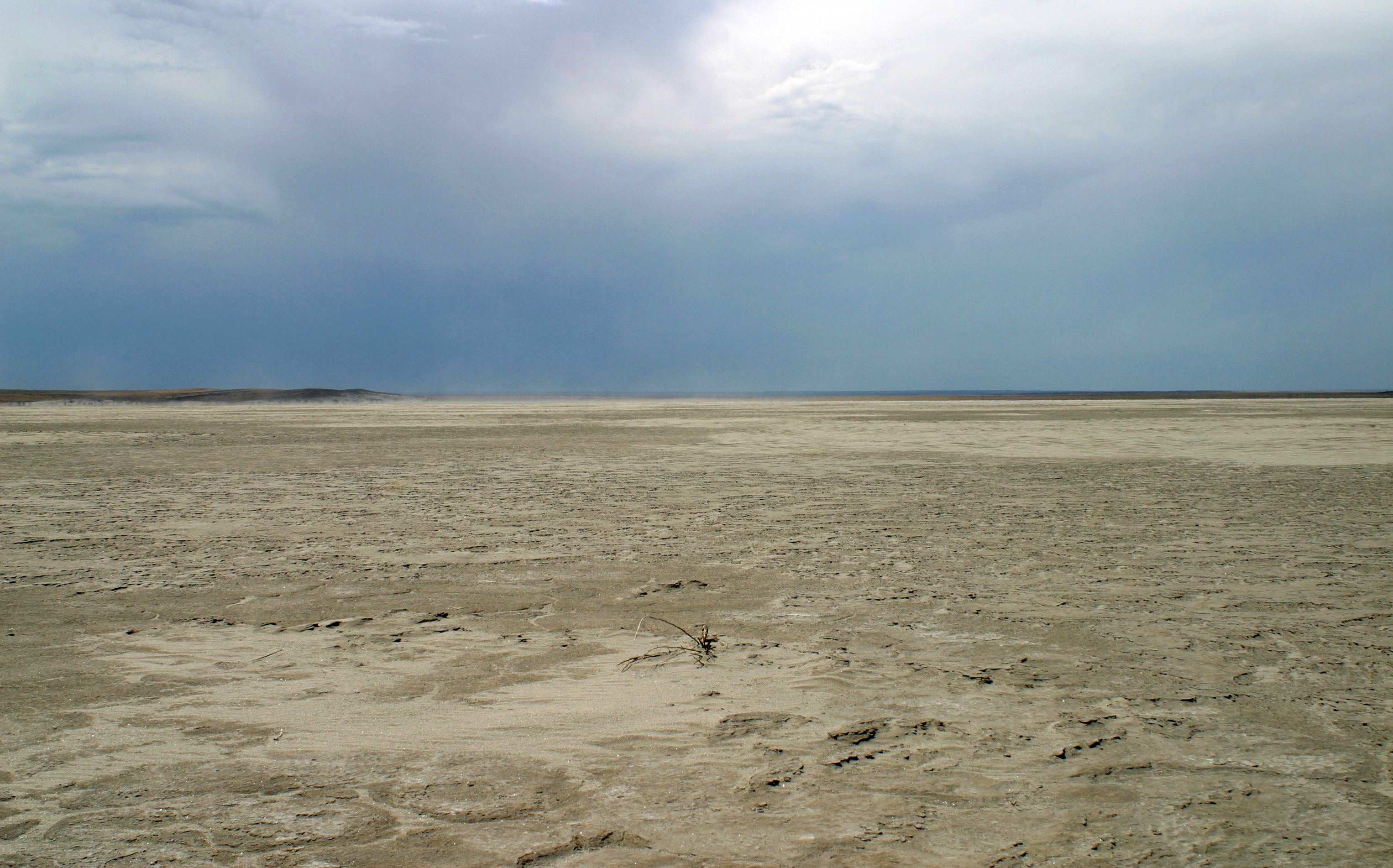
- Flat playa surface of Arch Lake

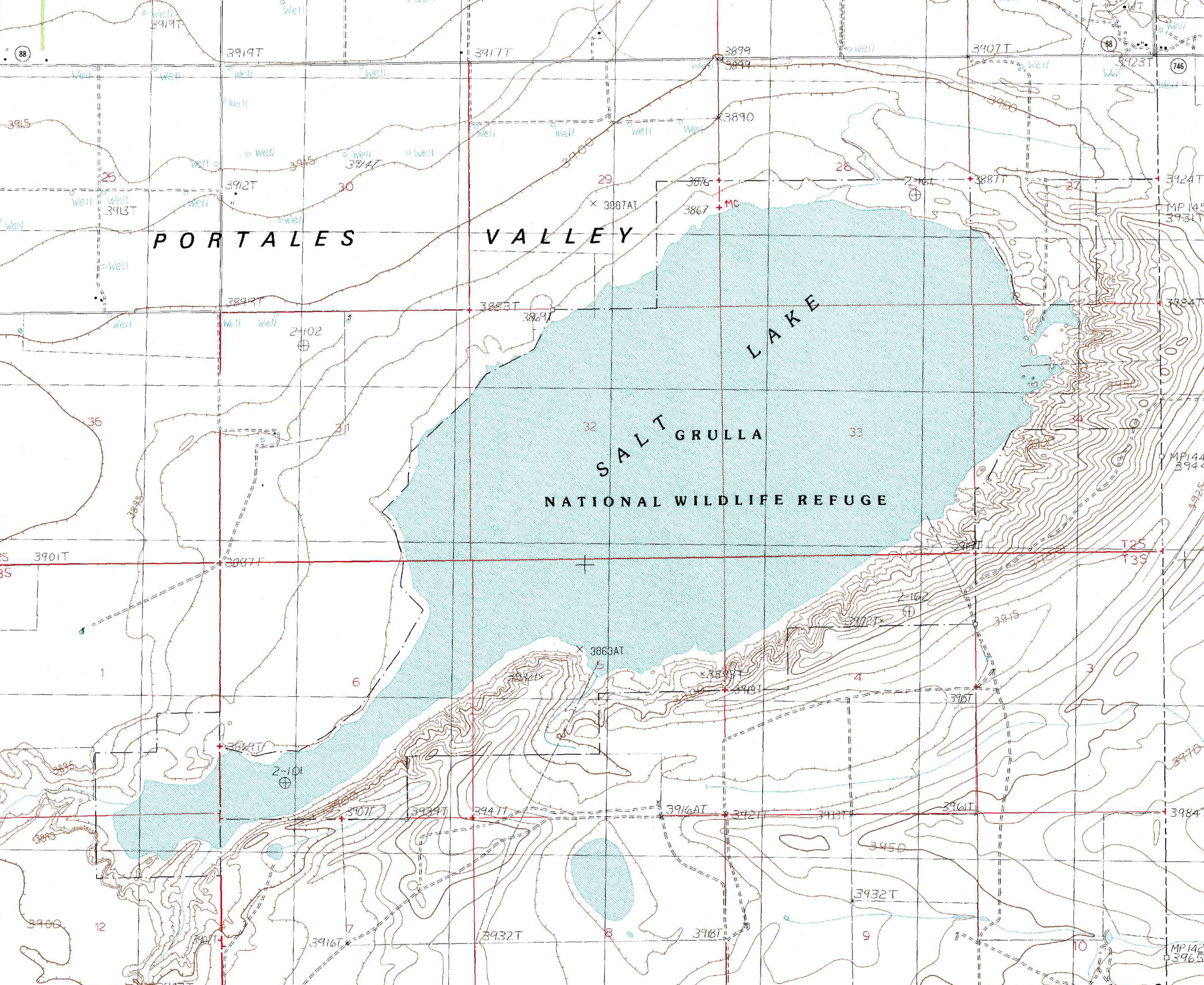
- Location: Roosevelt County, New Mexico / Bailey County, Texas, United States
- Nearest city: Portales, New Mexico
- Coordinates: 34°05′43″N 103°04′00″W
- Area: 13.1 km^{2} (5.1 sq mi)
- Elevation: 1,177 m (3,862 ft)
- Established: 1969
- Operator: U.S. Fish and Wildlife Service
- Website: Grulla NWR

Grulla National Wildlife Refuge is located primarily in eastern New Mexico in Roosevelt County, southwest of the intersection of State Highway 88 and the Texas - New Mexico border about 25 miles southeast of Portales, New Mexico and southeast of the tiny community of Arch.

The central focal point of the Grulla National Wildlife Refuge is an ephemeral salt lake or saline playa – a shallow basin that collects runoff from the surrounding drainage area during heavy downpours but then often dries completely due to evaporation. This playa lake has been known by various names. Current USGS topographic maps and most commercially available maps of this region refer to this saline playa simply as "Salt Lake". Back in the early 1880s, this playa was part of the DZ Ranch, and those familiar with the ranch often favor the name "DZ Lake". The lake is also frequently called "Arch Lake" after the nearby community of Arch, New Mexico, located around 6 km to the northwest.

The word grulla is Spanish for crane. When wet, the playa lake provides habitat to sandhill cranes and the grasslands within the refuge provide habitat to other birds such as ring-necked pheasants, lesser prairie-chickens, and scaled quails.

The refuge has no facilities other than a parking lot and trails and is administered by Muleshoe National Wildlife Refuge in Texas. It was often used in the mid 2000s as a training site for the Eastern New Mexico University cross country teams.

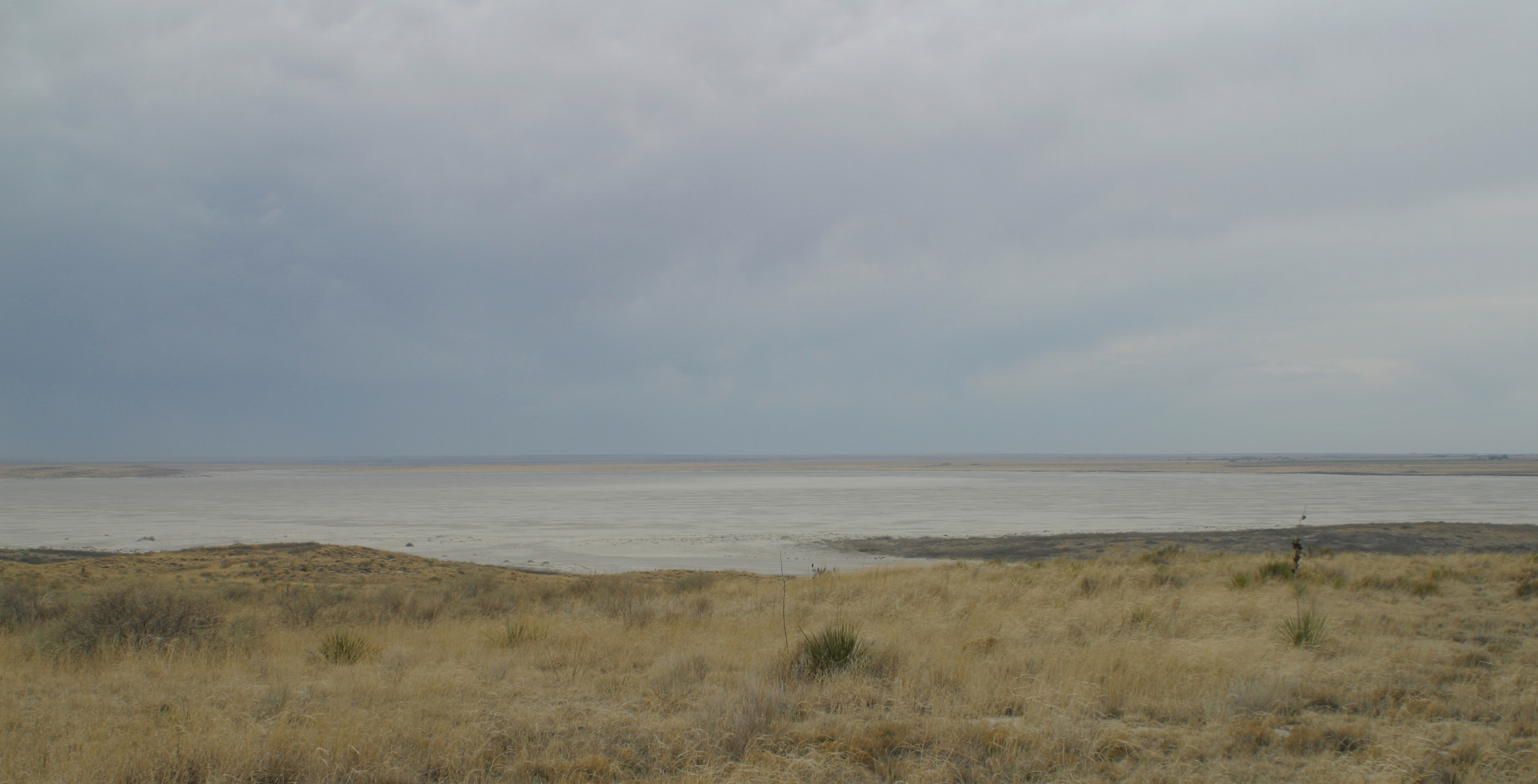
Saline playa within Grulla National Wildlife Refuge

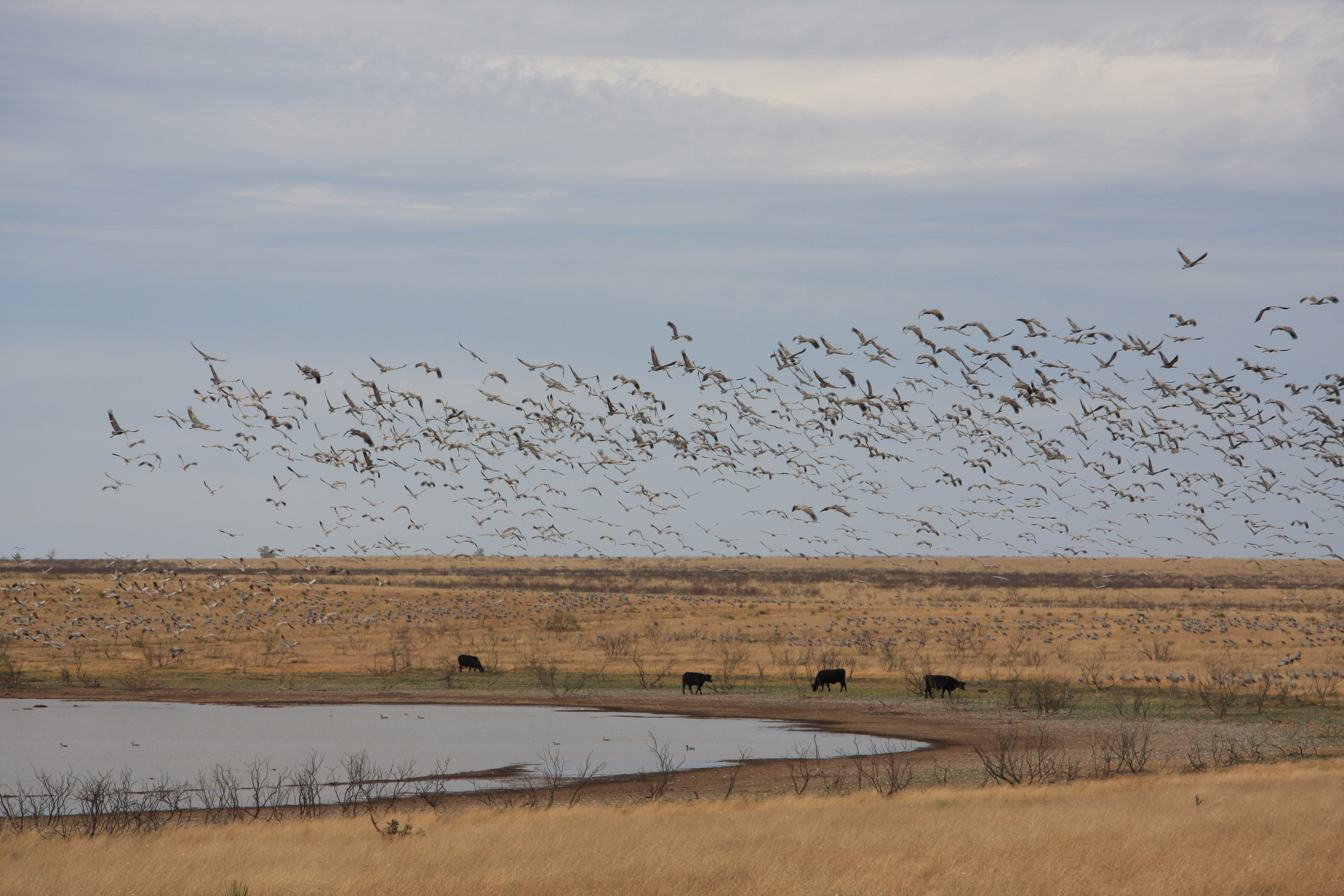
Sandhill cranes near Grulla National Wildlife Refuge

== See also ==
- Muleshoe National Wildlife Refuge
- Blackwater Draw
- Llano Estacado
- Eastern New Mexico
