= Sandhill crane =

Sandhill crane Temporal range: 2.5–0 Ma Early Pleistocene – recent
- Greater sandhill crane (Antigone canadensis pratensis) in Florida, U.S.
- USFWS recording

Conservation status
- Least Concern (IUCN 3.1)
- CITES Appendix II (Note: Antigone canadensis nesiotes and Antigone canadensis pulla are listed in CITES Appendix I)

Scientific classification
- Kingdom: Animalia
- Phylum: Chordata
- Class: Aves
- Order: Gruiformes
- Family: Gruidae
- Genus: Antigone
- Species: A. canadensis

Binomial name
- Antigone canadensis (Linnaeus, 1758)

Subspecies
- Antigone canadensis canadensis (Linnaeus, 1758); Antigone canadensis pratensis (F. A. A. Meyer, 1794); Antigone canadensis nesiotes Bangs & Zappey, 1905; Antigone canadensis tabida (J. L. Peters, 1925); Antigone canadensis rowani (disputed) Walkinshaw, 1965; Antigone canadensis pulla Aldrich, 1972; and see text
- Geographical distribution of the sandhill crane. Breeding Migration Year-round Nonbreeding

Synonyms
- Ardea canadensis Linnaeus, 1758; Grus minor Miller, 1910; Grus proavus Marsh, 1872; Grus canadensis (Linnaeus, 1758); and see text

Species of bird

The sandhill crane (Antigone canadensis) is a species of large crane of North America and extreme northeastern Siberia. The common name of this bird refers to its habitat, such as the Platte River, on the edge of Nebraska's Sandhills on the American Great Plains. Sandhill cranes are known to frequent the edges of bodies of water. The central Platte River Valley in Nebraska is the most important stopover area for the nominotypical subspecies, the lesser sandhill crane (A. c. canadensis), with up to 450,000 of these birds migrating through annually.

== Taxonomy ==
In 1750, British naturalist George Edwards included an illustration and a description of the sandhill crane in the third volume of his A Natural History of Uncommon Birds, referring to the species as the 'Brown and Ash-colour'd Crane'. Edwards based his hand-colored etching on a preserved specimen that had been brought to London from the Hudson Bay area of Canada by James Isham. When in 1758, Swedish naturalist Carl Linnaeus updated his Systema Naturae for the 10th edition, he placed the sandhill crane with herons and cranes in the genus Ardea. Linnaeus included a brief description, coined the binomial name Ardea canadensis, and cited Edwards' work.

The sandhill crane was formerly placed in the genus Grus, but a molecular phylogenetic study published in 2010 found that the genus, as then defined, was polyphyletic. In the resulting rearrangement to create monophyletic genera, four species, including the sandhill crane, were placed in the resurrected genus Antigone that had originally been erected by German naturalist Ludwig Reichenbach in 1853.

The specific epithet canadensis is the modern Latin word for "from Canada".

Five subspecies are recognised:

- A. c. canadensis (Linnaeus, 1758) – northeast Siberia through Alaska and northern Canada to Baffin Island
- A. c. nesiotes (Bangs & Zappey, 1905) – Cuba and Isla de la Juventud (Isle of Pines)
- A. c. pratensis (Meyer, FAA, 1794) – Georgia and Florida
- A. c. pulla (Aldrich, 1972) – Mississippi
- A. c. tabida (Peters, JL, 1925) – southern Canada and west-central United States

A 2025 study showed a deep genetic divide between the sandhill crane populations, with geographic barriers resulting in minimal gene flow between inland and coastal populations. The inland and coastal populations of sandhill cranes show consistent morphological differences in size, colour, and facial structure that can be observed in field conditions. The two populations also differ in behavior and preferred habitat. The authors of the study argue that the diversity within the species must be better reflected in conservation efforts in order to protect vulnerable populations.

== Description ==
Adults are gray overall; during breeding, their plumage is usually much worn and stained, particularly in the migratory populations, and looks nearly ochre. The average weight of the larger males is 4.57 kg (10.1 lb), while the average weight of females is 4.02 kg (8.9 lb), with a range of 2.7 to 6.7 kg (6.0 to 14.8 lb) across the subspecies. Sandhill cranes have red foreheads, white cheeks, and long, dark, pointed bills. In flight, their long, dark legs trail behind, and their long necks keep straight.

Immature birds have reddish-brown upper parts and gray underparts. The juveniles do not have the characteristic red foreheads, making distinguishing the young from the parents possible, even when they are the same height.

The sexes look alike. Sizes vary among the different subspecies; the typical height of these birds is around 80 to 136 cm (2 ft 7 in to 4 ft 6 in). Their wing chords are typically 41.8–60.0 cm (16.5–23.6 in), tails are 10.0–26.4 cm (3.9–10.4 in), the exposed culmens are 6.9–16 cm (2.7–6.3 in) long, and the tarsi measure 15.5–26.6 cm (6.1–10.5 in). Wingspan is 200 cm (78.7 in).

These cranes frequently give a loud, trumpeting call that suggests a rolled "r" in the throat, and they can be heard from a long distance. Mated pairs of cranes engage in "unison calling". The cranes stand close together, calling in a synchronized and complex duet. The female makes two calls for every one from the male.

Sandhill cranes' large wingspans, typically 1.65 to 2.30 m (5 ft 5 in to 7 ft 7 in), make them very skilled soaring birds, similar in style to hawks and eagles. Using thermals to obtain lift, they can stay aloft for many hours, requiring only occasional flapping of their wings, thus expending little energy. Migratory flocks contain hundreds of birds, and can create clear outlines of the normally invisible rising columns of air (thermals) they ride.

Sandhill cranes fly south for the winter. In their wintering areas, they form flocks over 10,000. One place this happens is at Bosque del Apache National Wildlife Refuge, 100 miles (160 km) south of Albuquerque, New Mexico. An annual Sandhill Crane Festival is held there in November.

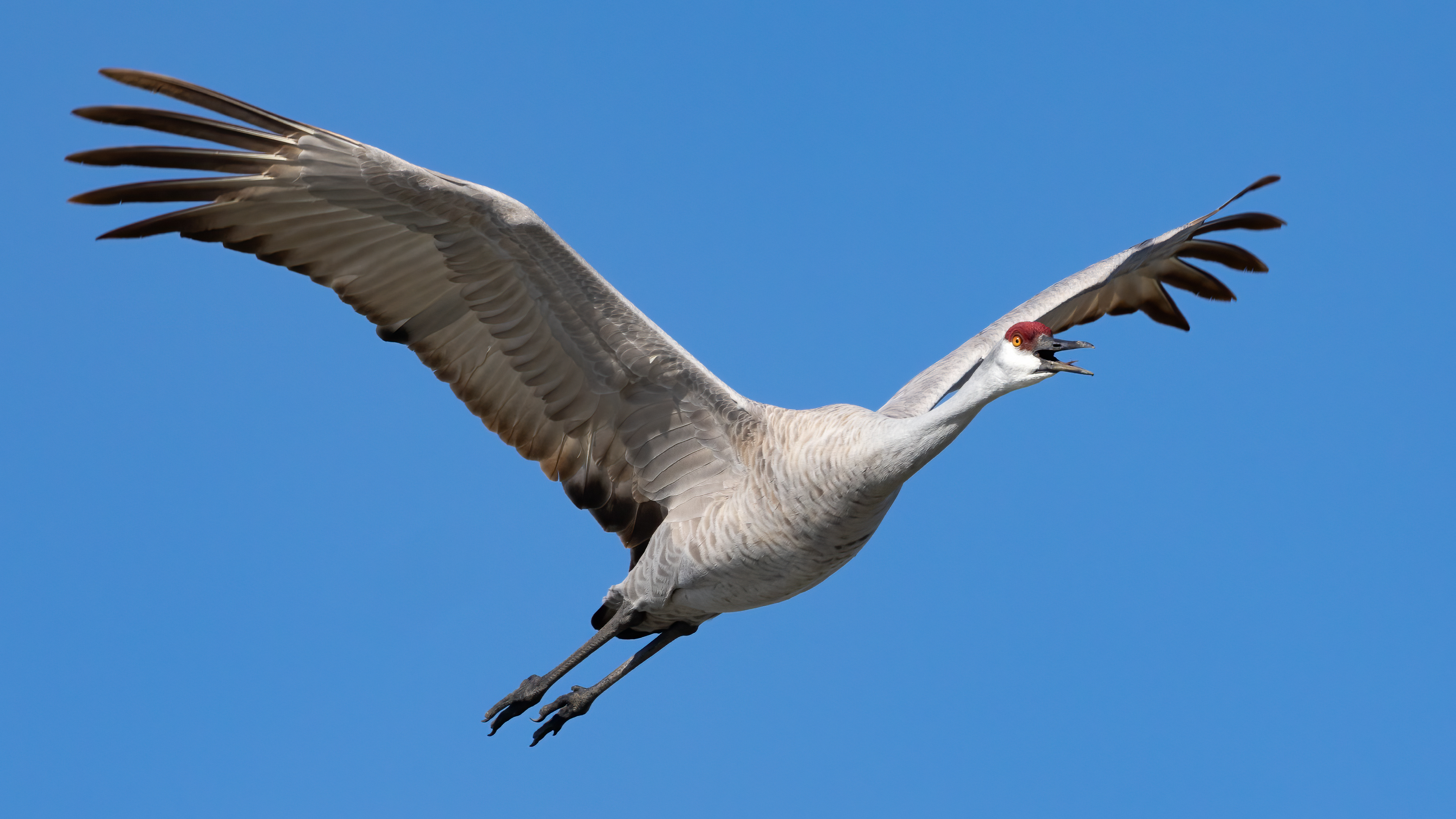
Sandhill crane in flight at the Llano Seco Unit of the Sacramento National Wildlife Refuge Complex, California, U.S.

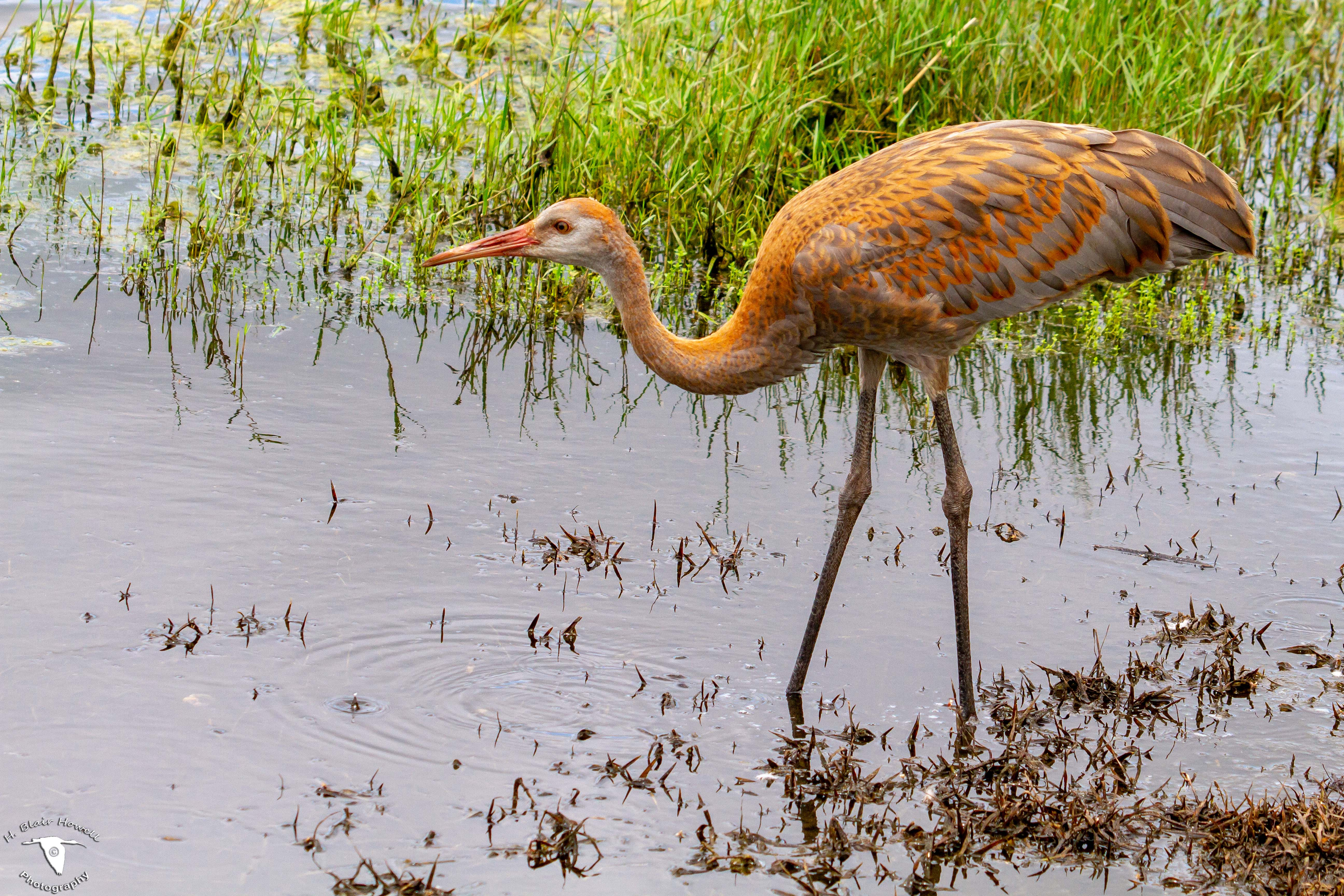
An immature Florida sandhill crane walks along the shore of Lake Cecile near Kissimmee, Florida.

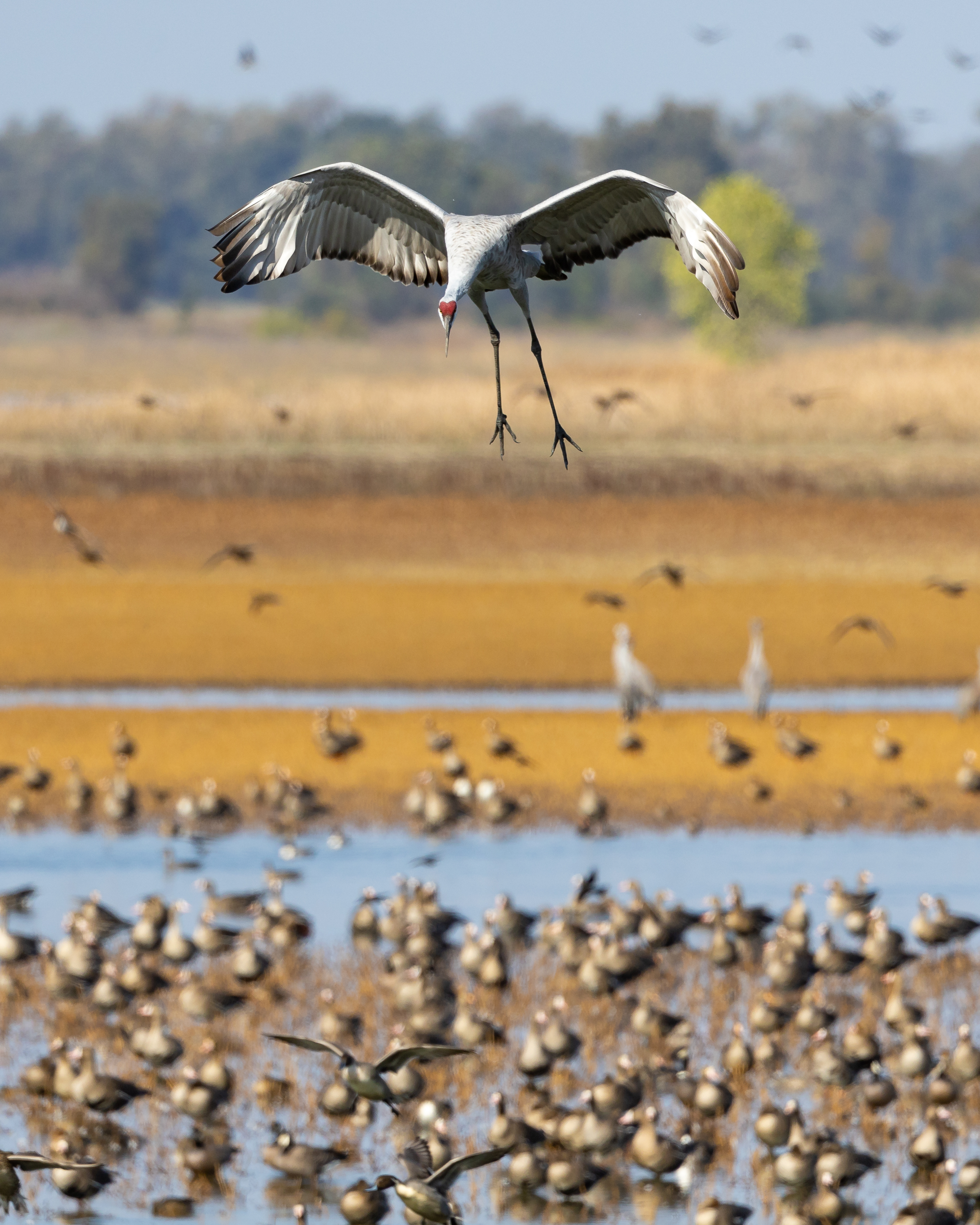
Sandhill crane in flight at the Sacramento National Wildlife Refuge

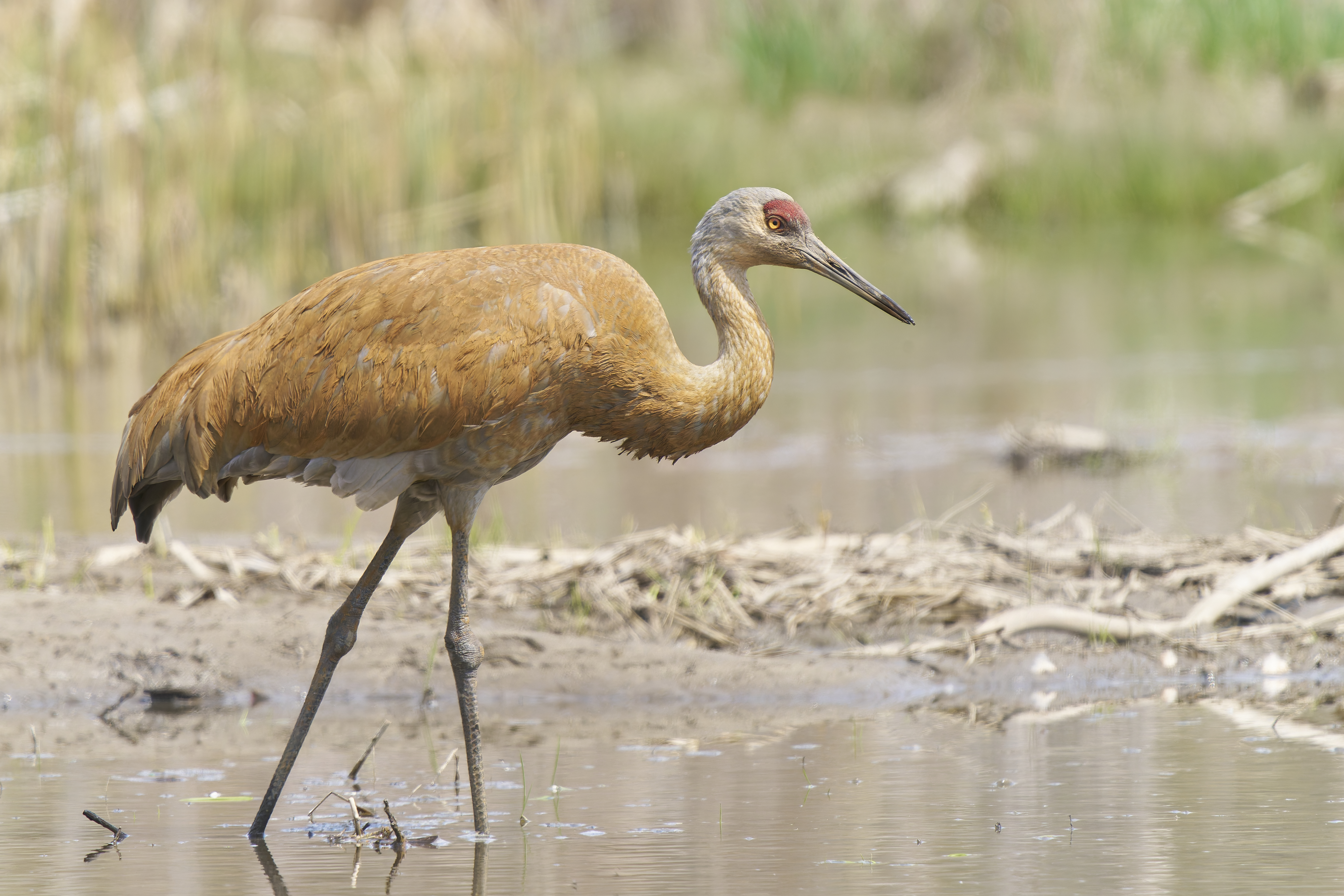
Adult crane with ochre plumage

=== Fossil record ===
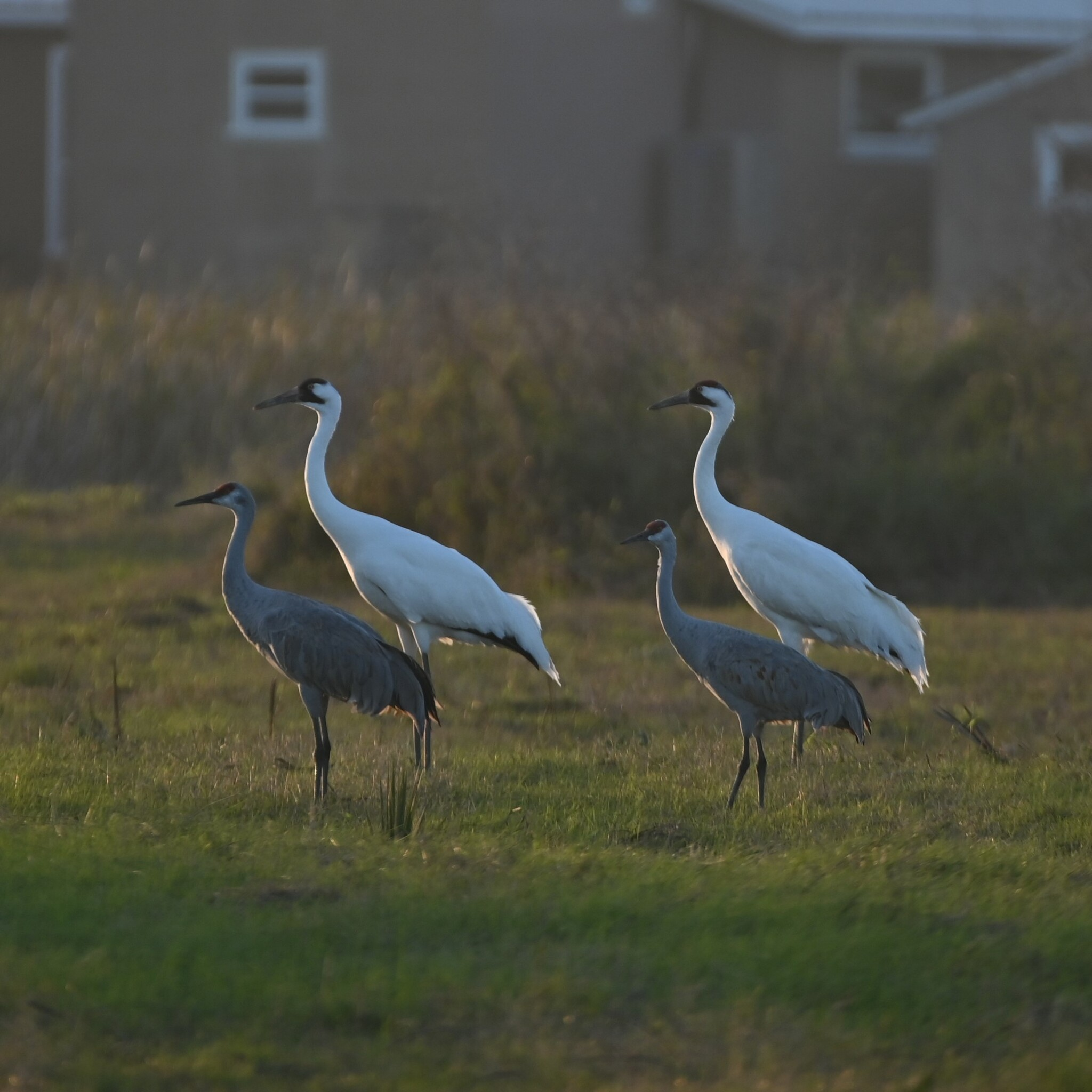
Sandhill cranes and whooping cranes, in Texas

Sandhill cranes have one of the longest fossil histories of any extant bird. A 10-million-year-old crane fossil from Nebraska is said to be of this species, but this may be from a prehistoric relative or ancestor of sandhill cranes, of a genus other than Grus and Antigone. The oldest unequivocal sandhill crane fossil is 2.5 million years old, older by half than the earliest remains of most living species of birds, primarily found from after the Pliocene/Pleistocene boundary some 1.8 million years ago. As these ancient sandhill cranes varied as much in size as present-day birds, those Pliocene fossils are sometimes described as new species. Grus haydeni may have been a prehistoric relative, or it may comprise material of a sandhill crane and its ancestor.

=== Subspecies and evolution ===
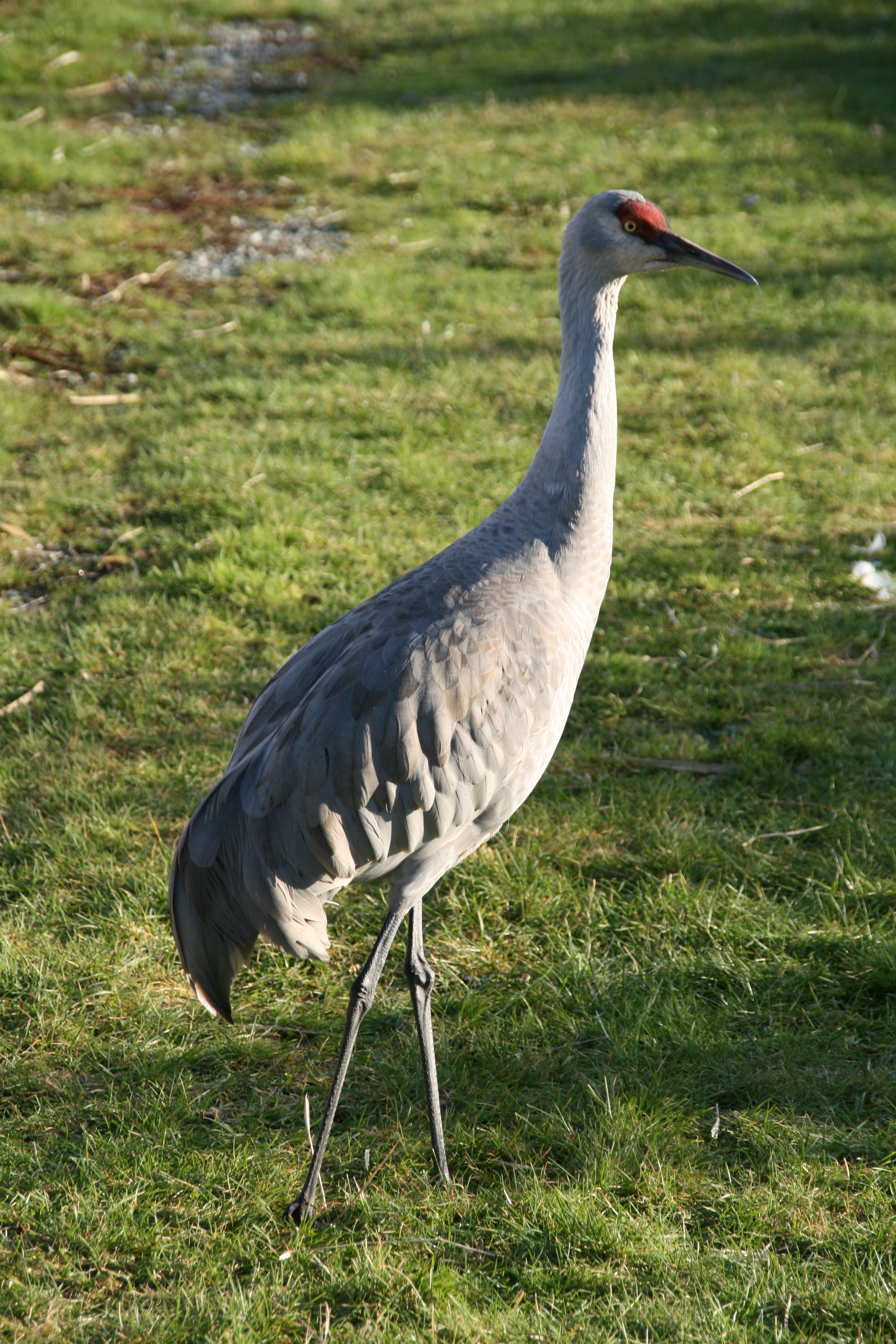
Lesser sandhill crane (A. c. canadensis) George C. Reifel Migratory Bird Sanctuary, Ladner, British Columbia

Sandhill cranes vary considerably in size (much of which is clinal) and in migratory habits. A female of A. c. canadensis averages 3.46 kg (7.6 lb) in weight, 94 cm (37 in) in length, and 1.6 m (5 ft 3 in) in wingspan. A male of A. c. tabida averages 5 kg (11 lb), 119 cm (47 in), and 2.12 m (6 ft 11 in) in comparison. The southern subspecies (along with A. c. rowani) are intermediate, roughly according to Bergmann's rule.

Three subspecies are resident: A. c. pulla of the Gulf Coast of the U.S., A. c. pratensis of Florida and Georgia, and A. c. nesiotes of Cuba. The northern populations exist as fragmented remains in the contiguous U.S. and a large and contiguous population from Canada to Beringia. These migrate to the Southwestern United States and Mexico. These cranes are rare vagrants to China, South Korea, and Japan and very rare vagrants to Western Europe.

Six subspecies have been recognized in recent times:

- Lesser sandhill crane, A. c. canadensis
- Cuban sandhill crane, A. c. nesiotes – ESA: endangered
- Florida sandhill crane, A. c. pratensis
- Mississippi sandhill crane, A. c. pulla – ESA: endangered
- Canadian sandhill crane, A. c. rowani
- Greater sandhill crane, A. c. tabida

The Florida sandhill crane was listed as EC or easily confused to facilitate an attempted reintroduction of the whooping crane (Grus americana) into Florida. The attempt failed, but the listing remained. The current list of endangered subspecies includes only two birds, A. c. nesiotes and A. c. rowani, with A. c. pratensis no longer listed. Sandhill cranes occur in pastures, open prairies and freshwater wetlands in peninsular Florida from the Everglades to the Okefenokee Swamp.

Some authorities no longer recognize Canadian sandhill crane as a distinct subspecies, as insignificant genetic differentiation and minimal morphological differentiation exist between the greater sandhill crane and it. The others can be somewhat more reliably distinguished in hand by measurements and plumage details, apart from the size differences already mentioned. Unequivocal identification often requires location information, which is often impossible in migrating birds.

Analysis of control-region mtDNA haplotype data shows two major lineages. The arctic and the subarctic migratory population includes the lesser sandhill cranes. The other lineages can be divided into a migratory and some indistinct clusters, which can be matched to the resident subspecies. The lesser and greater sandhill cranes are quite distinct, their divergence dating to roughly 2.3–1.2 million years ago, sometime during the Late Pliocene or Early Pleistocene. Glaciation seemingly fragmented off a founder population of lesser sandhill cranes, because during each major ice age, its present breeding range was frozen year-round. Still, sandhill cranes are amply documented from fossil and subfossil remains right to the modern era. Conceivably, they might be considered distinct species already, a monotypic A. canadensis and the greater sandhill crane, A. pratensis, which would include the other populations.

The scant differences between southern Canadian and western U.S. populations appear to result from genetic drift, due to the recent reduction in population and range fragmentation. Until the early 20th century, the southern migratory birds occupied a much larger and continuous range. Thus, the subspecies A. c. rowani may well be abandoned.

The two southern U.S. resident populations are somewhat more distinct. The Cuban population has been comparatively little studied, but appears to have been established on the island for a long time. They and the migratory greater sandhill cranes may form a group of lineages that diverged much later from a range in the southern U.S. that may have extended as far as northern Mexico, where they were resident. The southern migratory population would then indicate a re-colonization by the species, which re-evolved their migratory habits independent from the northernmost birds, the geographically separated populations expanding rapidly when more habitat was available as the last ice age ended.

== Behavior ==
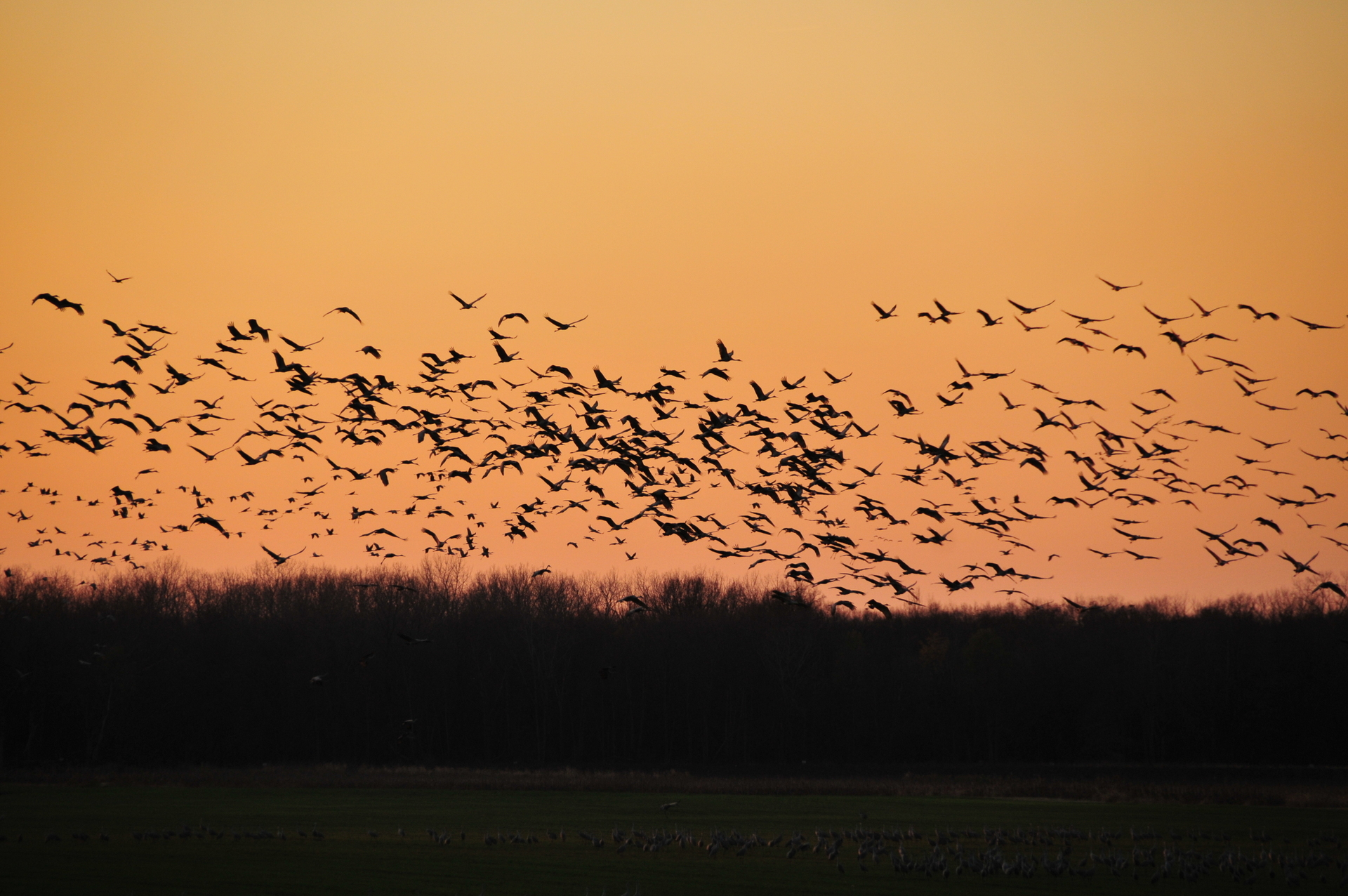
Sandhill Cranes migrating through Jasper-Pulaski Fish and Wildlife Area in Indiana

Sandhill cranes are fairly social birds that usually live in pairs or family groups through the year. During migration and winter, unrelated cranes come together to form "survival groups" that forage and roost together. Such groups often congregate at migration and winter sites, sometimes in the thousands.

=== Diet ===
Sandhill cranes are mainly herbivorous, but eat various types of food, depending on availability. They often feed with their bills down to the ground as they root around for seeds and other foods, in shallow wetlands with vegetation or various upland habitats. Cranes readily eat cultivated foods such as corn, wheat, cottonseed, and sorghum. Waste corn is useful to cranes preparing for migration, providing them with nutrients for the long journey. Among northern races of sandhill cranes, their diet is most varied, especially among breeding birds. They variously feed on berries, small mammals, insects, snails, reptiles, and amphibians.

=== Breeding ===
Sandhill cranes raise one brood per year. In nonmigratory populations, laying begins between December and August. In migratory populations, laying usually begins in April or May. Both members of a breeding pair build the nest using plant material from the surrounding area. Nest sites are usually marshes, bogs, or swales, though occasionally on dry land. Females lay one to three (usually two) oval, dull brown eggs with reddish markings. Both parents incubate the eggs, for about 30 days. The chicks are precocial; they hatch covered in down, with their eyes open, and able to leave the nest within a day. The parents brood the chicks for up to three weeks after hatching, feeding them intensively for the first few weeks, then gradually less frequently until they reach independence at 9 to 10 months old.

The chicks remain with their parents until one to two months before the parents lay the next clutch of eggs the following year, remaining with them for 10–12 months. After leaving their parents, the chicks form nomadic flocks with other juveniles and nonbreeders. They remain in these flocks until they form breeding pairs between two and seven years old.

It is possible for sandhill cranes to hybridize with whooping cranes, a critically endangered species. Offspring resulting from these pairings are sterile and inherit intermediate characteristics of both parents. The monogamous habits of both species means that crossbreeding can threaten conservation efforts, and direct intervention may be needed used to prevent hybridization.

=== Predators ===
As a conspicuous ground-dwelling species, sandhill cranes are at risk from predators. Corvids, such as ravens and crows, gulls, jaegers, raptors, and mammals such as foxes, coyotes, and raccoons feed on young cranes and eggs. In Oregon and California, the most serious predators of chicks are reportedly coyotes, ravens, raccoons, American mink, and great horned owls, roughly in descending order. Cranes of all ages can be hunted by both North American species of eagles, bobcats, and possibly American alligators. Additionally, even a much smaller peregrine falcon was reported to have successfully killed a 3.1 kg (6.8 lb) adult sandhill crane in a stoop. In New Mexico, humans hunt them with a permit granted in a lottery draw during late fall. In total, 17 states allow hunting of sandhill cranes.

Sandhill cranes defend themselves and their young from aerial predators by jumping and kicking. Actively brooding adults are more likely to react aggressively to potential predators to defend their chicks than wintering birds, which most often normally try to evade attacks on foot or in flight. For land predators such as dogs, foxes, and coyotes, they move forward, often hissing, with their wings open and bills pointed. If the predator persists, the crane stabs with its bill and kicks. It can even kill predators by piercing through the skull with its sharp beak, and even coyotes can be killed.

In Florida, sandhill cranes may be eaten by some growth stage of invasive snakes, such as Burmese pythons, reticulated pythons, Southern African rock pythons, Central African rock pythons, boa constrictors, yellow anacondas, Bolivian anacondas, dark-spotted anacondas, and green anacondas.

A huge flock at Bosque del Apache National Wildlife Refuge, New Mexico

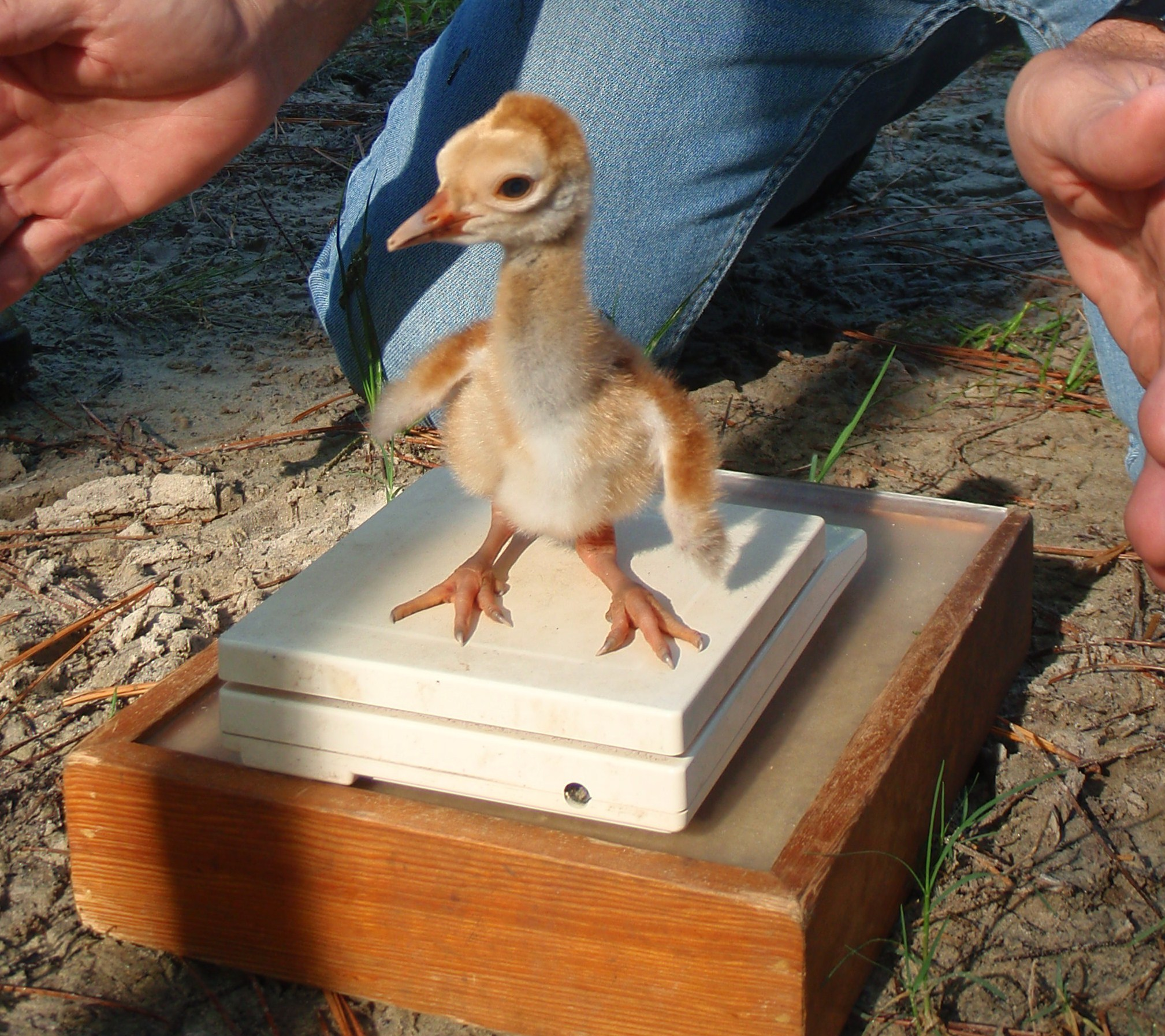
A baby Mississippi sandhill crane is weighed at White Oak Conservation.

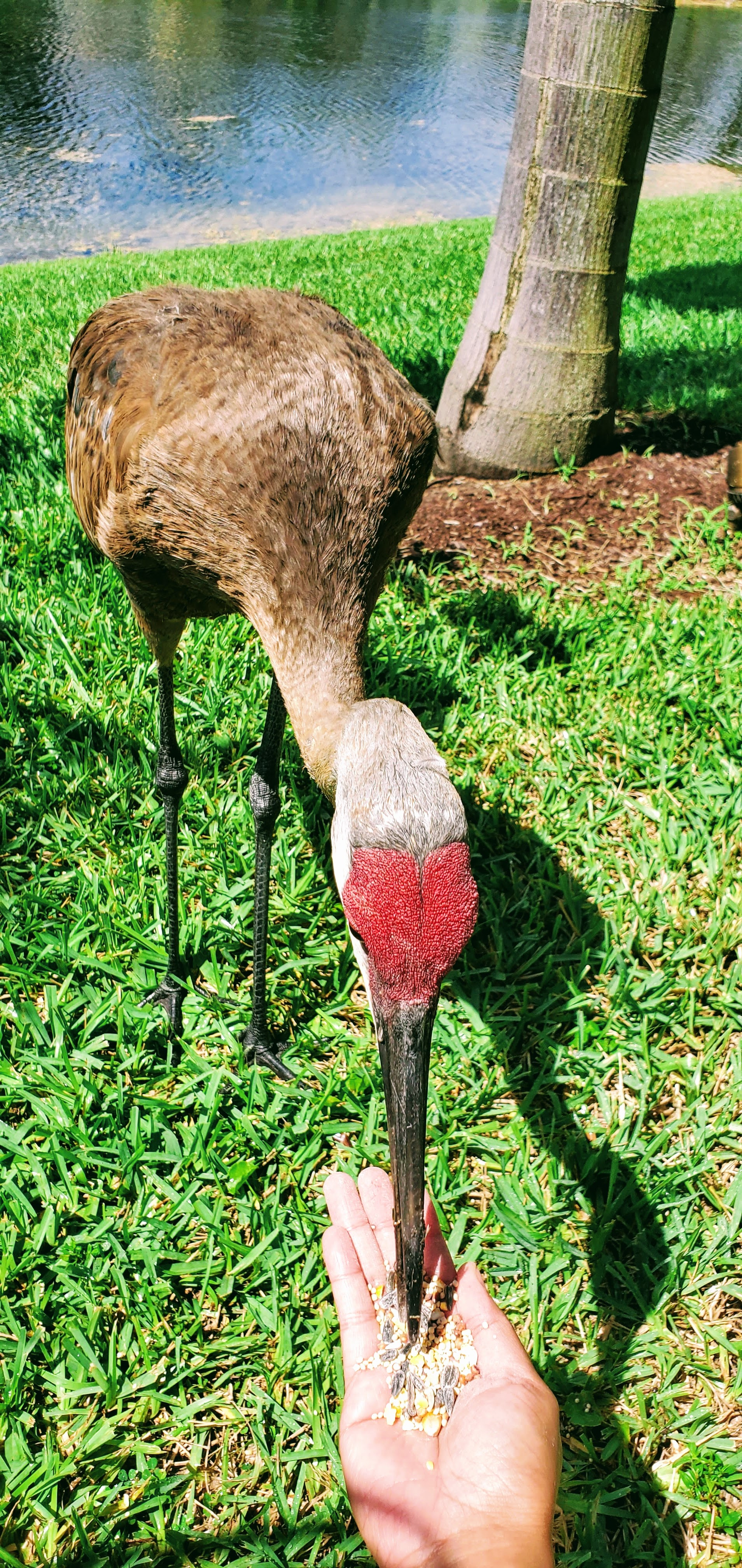
A human feeding a sandhill crane

== Status and conservation ==
=== Mainland North America ===
In the 1930s, sandhill cranes were generally extirpated east of the Mississippi River, but their populations have recovered, with an estimated 98,000 in the region in 2018, a substantial increase over the previous year. Although sandhill cranes are not considered threatened as a species, the three southernmost subspecies are quite rare. Resident populations, not migratory birds, cannot choose secure breeding habitat. Many subpopulations were destroyed by hunting or habitat change. The greater sandhill crane proper initially suffered most; by 1940, probably fewer than 1,000 birds remained. Populations have since increased greatly again. At nearly 100,000, they are still fewer than the lesser sandhill crane, which, at about 400,000 individuals continent-wide, is the most plentiful extant crane.

Some migratory populations of sandhill cranes face population threats due to interspecies competition with snow geese. Since the 1990s, snow geese have eaten waste corn on which the cranes also rely prior to migration. Sandhill crane populations are also threatened by hunting. Hunting cranes is legal throughout the states of the Central Flyway, from the Dakotas and Wyoming south to Oklahoma and Texas. Nebraska is the sole state along the Central Flyway where hunting cranes is illegal. Despite losses from hunting, interspecies competition and other pressures such as habitat loss, the species has expanded its range. Since the early 2000s, the sandhill crane has expanded both its winter (nonbreeding) and breeding ranges northward, including into upstate New York. In the 21st century, parts of the Midwestern United States have seen an extensive rebound of the species, especially in Wisconsin and Indiana.

The transplantation of wild birds and introduction of captive-reared birds into suitable low-population areas have been called viable management techniques.

The Mississippi sandhill crane has lost the most range; it used to live along most of the northern Gulf Coast, and its range was once nearly parapatric with that of its eastern neighbor. As of 2013, about 25 breeding pairs exist in an intensively managed population. The Mississippi Sandhill Crane National Wildlife Refuge—established in 1975 when fewer than 35 of the birds existed—has the biggest release program for cranes on Earth, and 90% of the cranes there were raised in captivity. The second viable egg from a two-egg nest was occasionally removed from the nests, starting in 1965, to become part of a captive flock. This breeding flock is divided between the Audubon Institute's Species Survival Center and White Oak Conservation in Yulee, Florida. These cranes have produced offspring for annual releases into the refuge.

A Mississippi sandhill crane was the first bird to hatch from an egg fertilized by sperm that was thawed from a cryogenic state. This occurred at the Audubon Institute, as part of this subspecies' endangered species recovery plan.

In January 2019, 25- to 30,000 cranes (both greater and lesser subspecies) were found wintering at the Whitewater Draw State Wildlife Area near McNeal in southeast Arizona.

Sandhill cranes have been tried as foster parents for whooping cranes in reintroduction schemes. This failed when the whooping cranes imprinted on their foster parents, later did not recognize other whooping cranes as their conspecifics, and unsuccessfully tried to pair with sandhill cranes, instead.

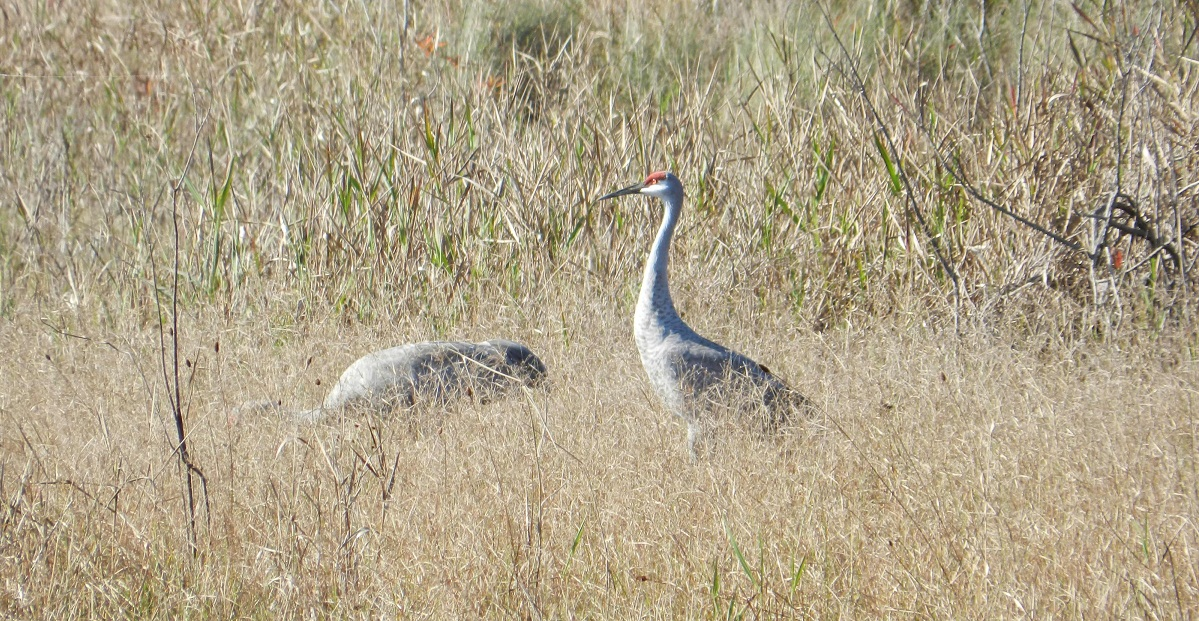
Florida sandhill crane, Ocala National Forest

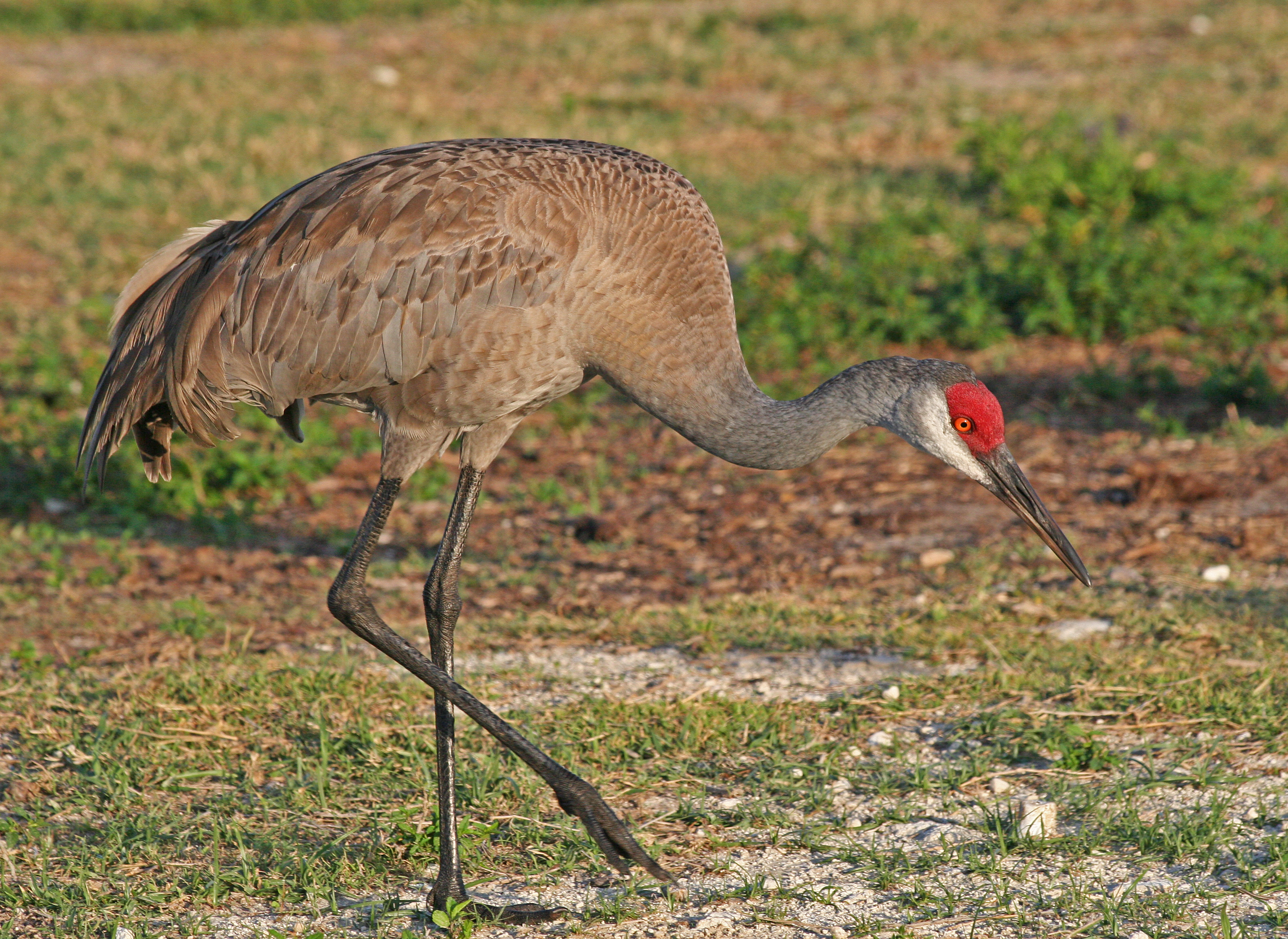
Sandhill crane at Jonathan Dickinson State Park, Florida

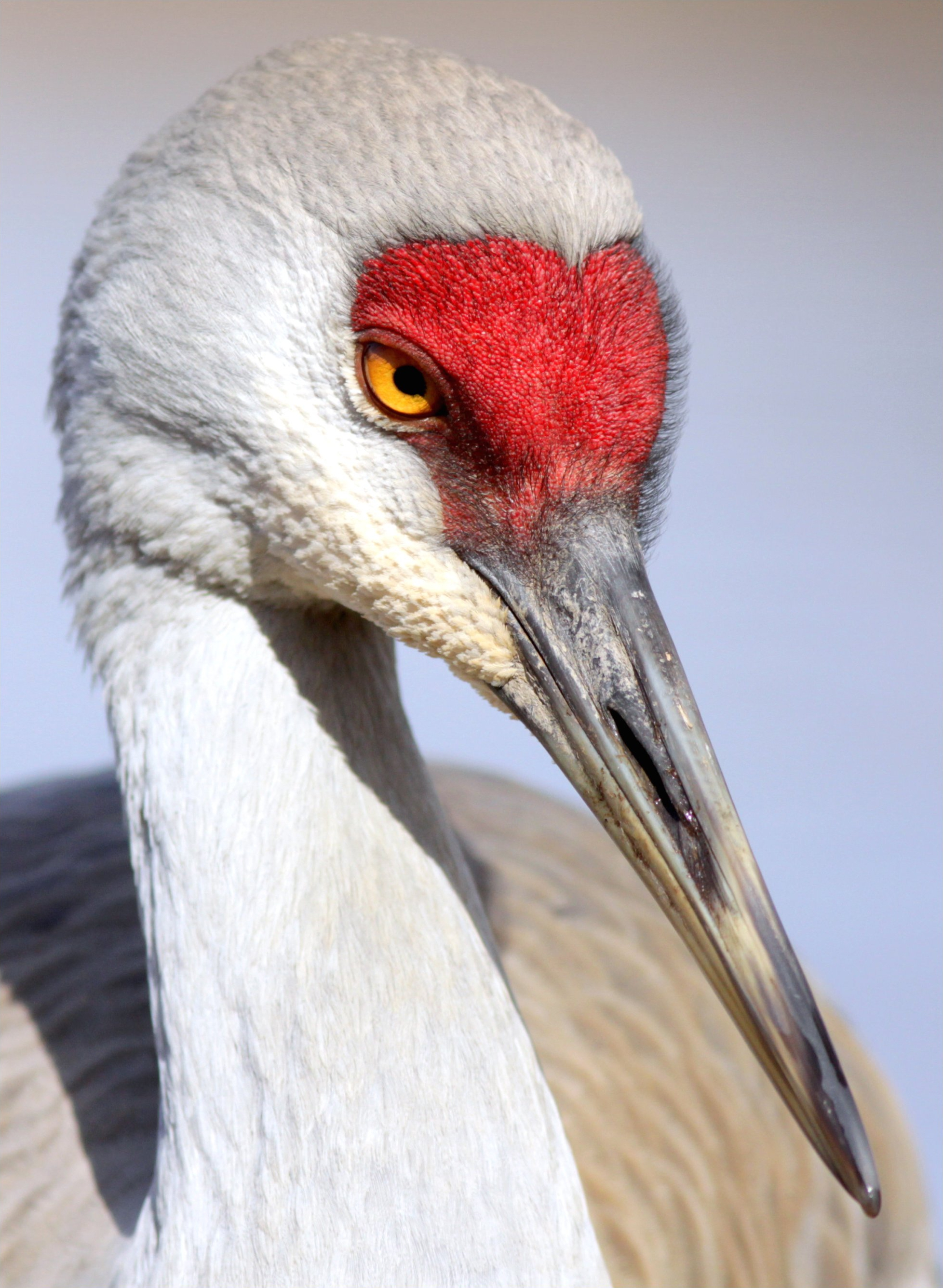
In British Columbia, Canada

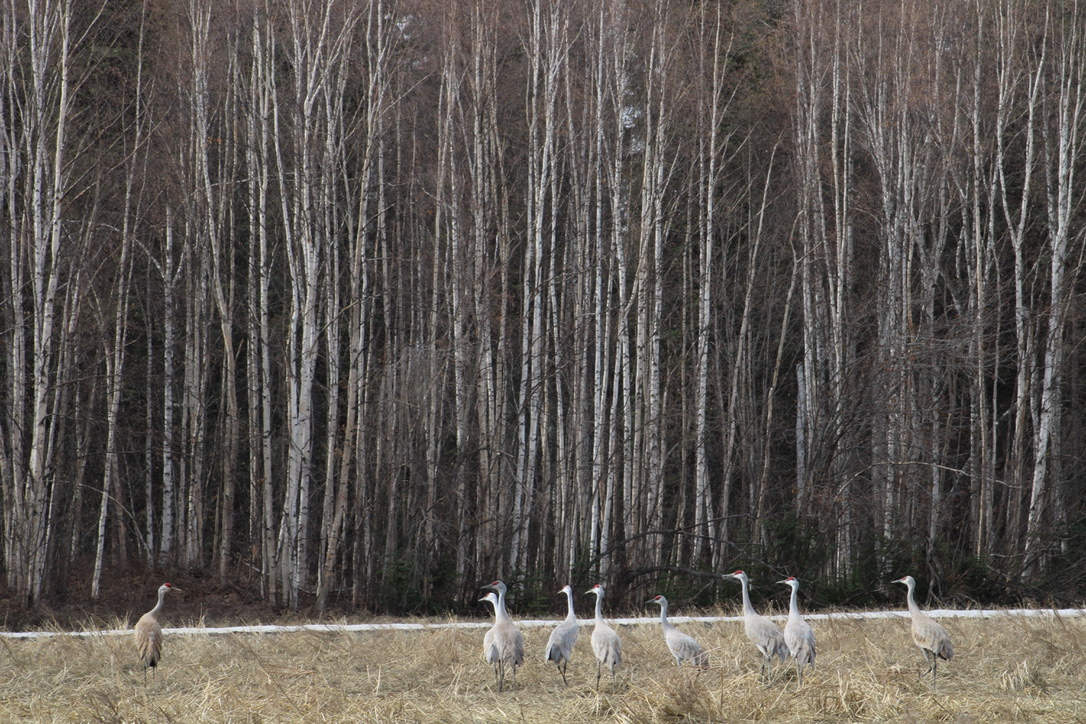
Sandhill cranes in Fairbanks, Alaska in May

=== Cuba ===
The Cuban sandhill crane (subspecies A. c. nesiotes) is not as rare as once believed, and while it remains threatened, its population is increasing. Based on very limited information, until the 1990s, it was typically believed to consist of about 300 birds. Detailed surveys conducted from 1994 to 2002 resulted in an estimate of about 525 individuals, while surveys from 2004 to 2015 estimated that the population now was above 550. Subsequent reviews have placed the Cuban sandhill crane population around 700 birds in 2017. They inhabit dry or seasonally flooded grasslands and savannas, as well as nearby wetlands, and the remaining populations are divided into 10 localities (it formerly occurred in two additional localities) in six provinces. Based on the surveys from 1994 to 2002, six of the 10 known localities each are home to less than 25 Cuban sandhill cranes; the last four each are home to more than 70. The two largest, one in the Zapata Swamp (c. 120 cranes) and another on Isla de la Juventud (c. 170 cranes), are increasing, whereas most other subpopulations appear to be stable, but some likely are too small for long-term survival and possibly are decreasing. Subsequent surveys indicate that at least the four largest subpopulation now are larger than they were in the 1994–2002 surveys.

Primary threats to Cuban sandhill cranes are habitat loss due to tree planting, spreading shrubs, expanding agriculture and fires, predation by non-native mammals (dogs, mongooses, and feral pigs), and poaching. Population fragmentation is also a problem, as all remaining localities are separated by distances that are greater than the largest distances nonmigratory sandhill cranes are known to move.

=== Vagrancy ===
Sandhill cranes occasionally reach Europe as vagrants. The first British record was on Fair Isle in April 1981, and the second was in Shetland in 1991. Small groups have also been seen in parts of eastern China and Taiwan. In 2022, reports emerged of regular sightings of sandhill cranes in New Brunswick, on the Atlantic coast of Canada. The mythical Mothman, a humanoid creature reportedly seen in the Point Pleasant, West Virginia, area from November 1966 to December 1967, is thought to have originated from sightings of out-of-migration sandhill cranes.

== In popular culture ==
In 2023, the "Mississippi sandhill crane" was featured on a United States Postal Service forever stamp as part of the Endangered Species set, based on a photograph from Joel Sartore's Photo Ark. The stamp was dedicated at a ceremony at the National Grasslands Visitor Center in Wall, South Dakota.

== See also ==
- Grulla National Wildlife Refuge
- Muleshoe National Wildlife Refuge
