= Muleshoe National Wildlife Refuge =

National Wildlife Refuge near Muleshoe, Texas

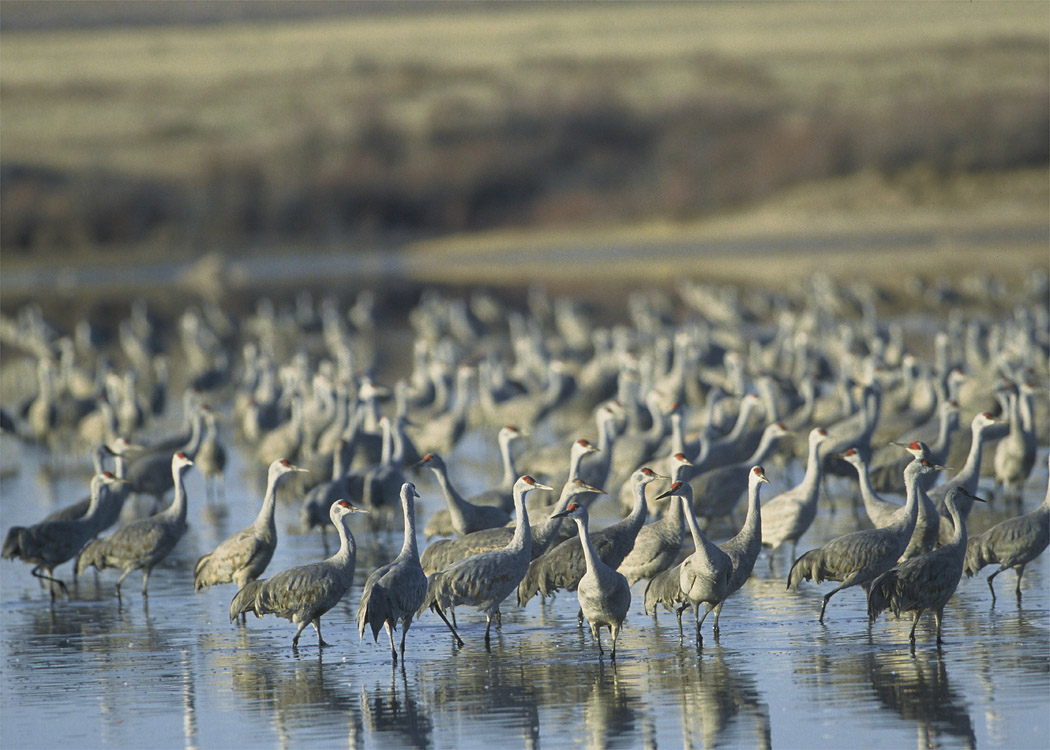
- Sandhill cranes at Muleshoe NWR photo by Wyman Meinzer

- Location within Texas
- Location: Bailey County, Texas
- Nearest city: Muleshoe, Texas
- Coordinates: 33°57′14″N 102°45′44″W
- Area: 6,440 acres (26.1 km^{2})
- Established: 1935
- Governing body: U.S. Fish and Wildlife Service
- Website: www.fws.gov/refuge/muleshoe/

Muleshoe National Wildlife Refuge is a 6,440-acre (26.1 km^{2}) wildlife refuge located about 20 miles (32 km) south of Muleshoe, Texas, on Texas State Highway 214. It is the oldest national wildlife refuge in Texas, having been established as the Muleshoe Migratory Waterfowl Refuge by executive order of President Franklin D. Roosevelt in 1935. Roosevelt issued a proclamation in 1940 to change the name to the Muleshoe National Wildlife Refuge. In 1980, Muleshoe National Wildlife Refuge was designated as a national natural landmark by the National Park Service.

The refuge is a stop for migratory waterfowl flying between Canada and Mexico. The refuge includes several intermittent salt lakes, some of which have been modified to extend their wet periods. Paul's Lake, on the east side of Highway 214, is spring-fed, and hosts wildlife during times when the other lakes are dry. If sufficient water is present during the winter, the refuge hosts tens of thousands of sandhill cranes. The largest number of cranes ever recorded was 250,000, during February 1981.

Other wildlife includes wood warblers, meadowlarks, raptors, burrowing owls, black-tailed prairie dogs, jackrabbits, cottontail rabbits, coyotes, black-footed ferrets, spotted chorus frogs, and badgers.

The prairie ecosystem includes plant life such as wildflowers, grasses, yucca, cacti, and mesquite. Rangeland management techniques include controlled burning and grazing.

Northeast of White Lake is a small area of white gypsum dunes, similar to those found at White Sands National Park in New Mexico, though these are much less expansive.

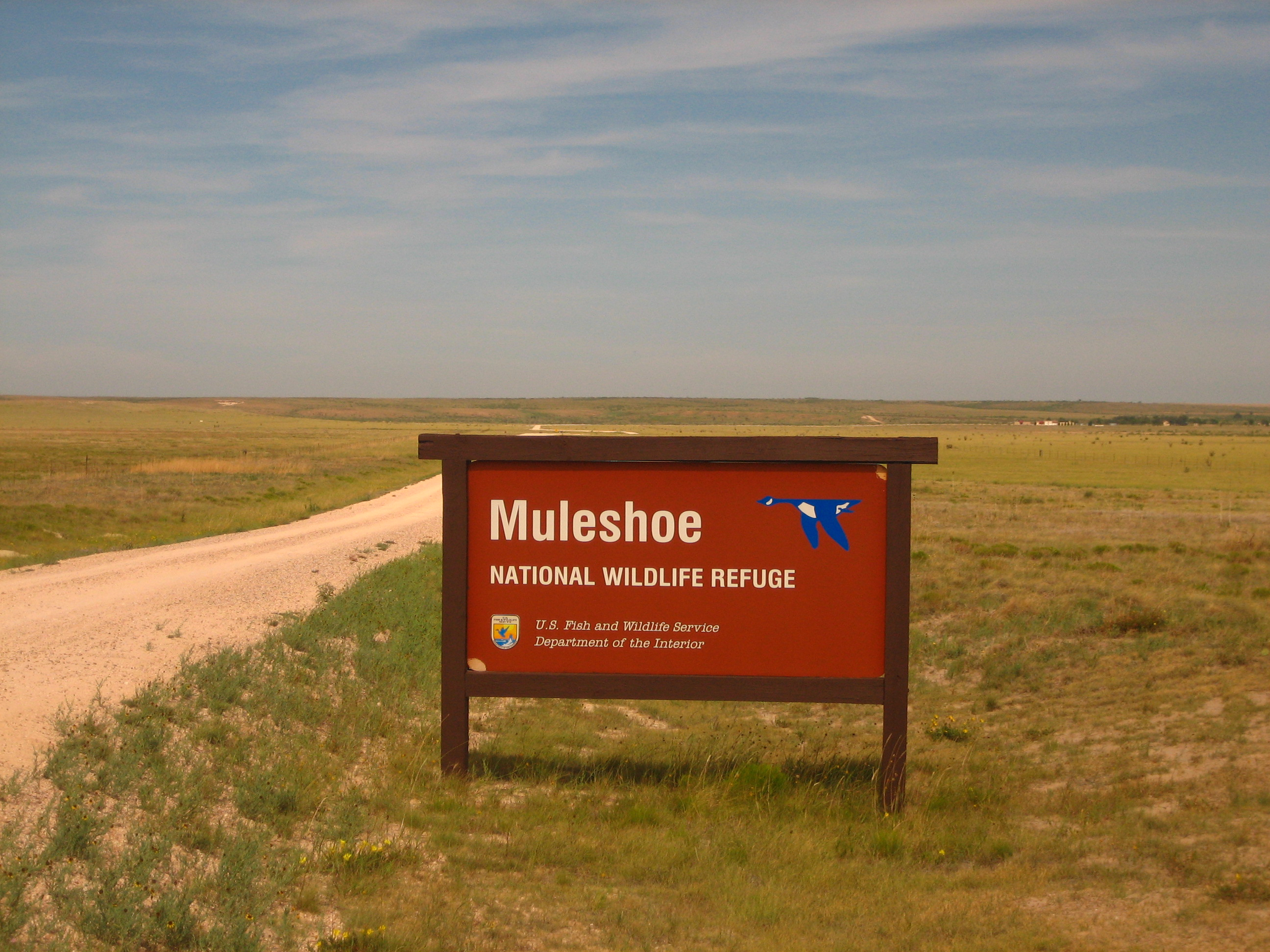
Entrance to Muleshoe National Wildlife Refuge

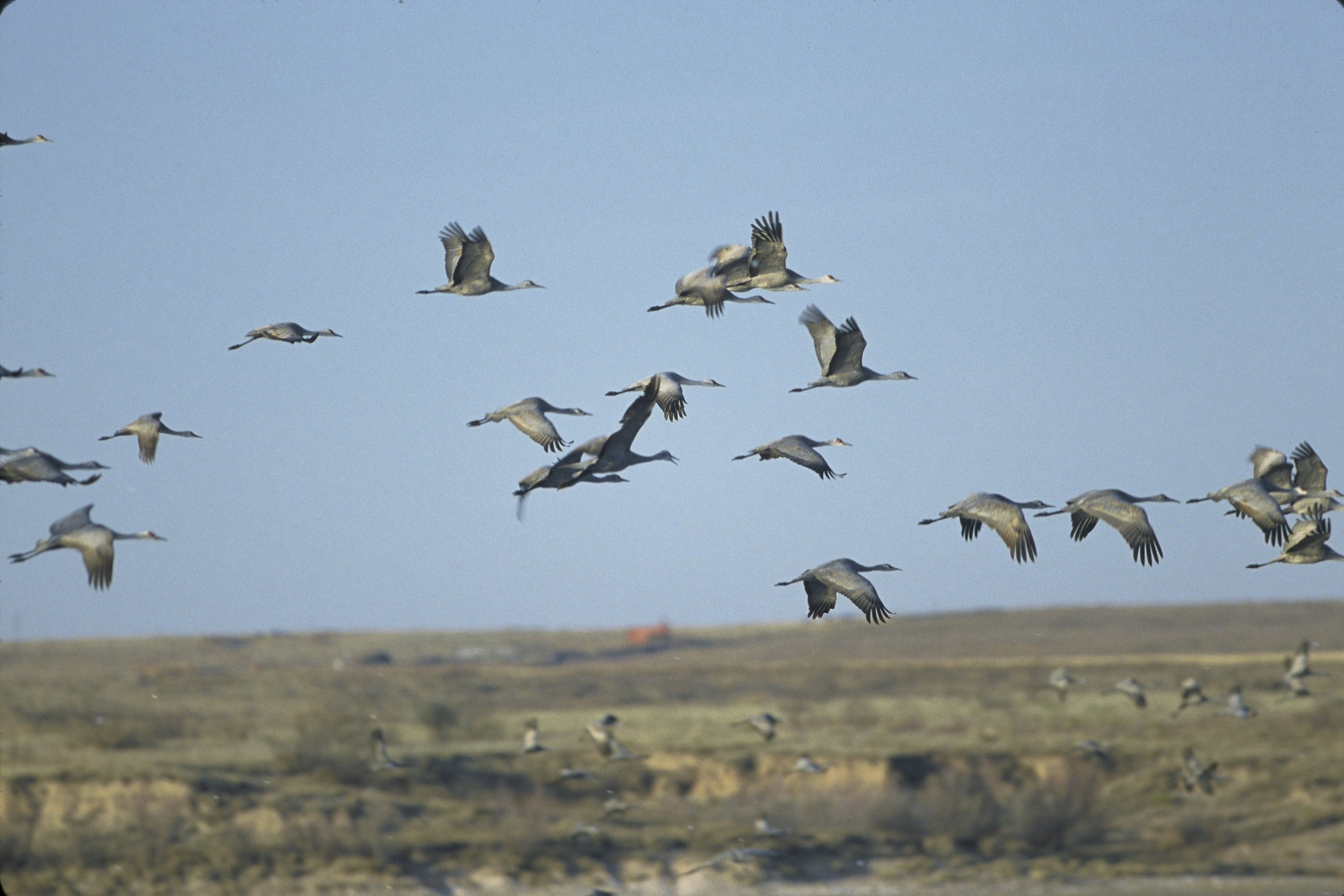
Sandhill cranes in flight, Muleshoe National Wildlife Refuge

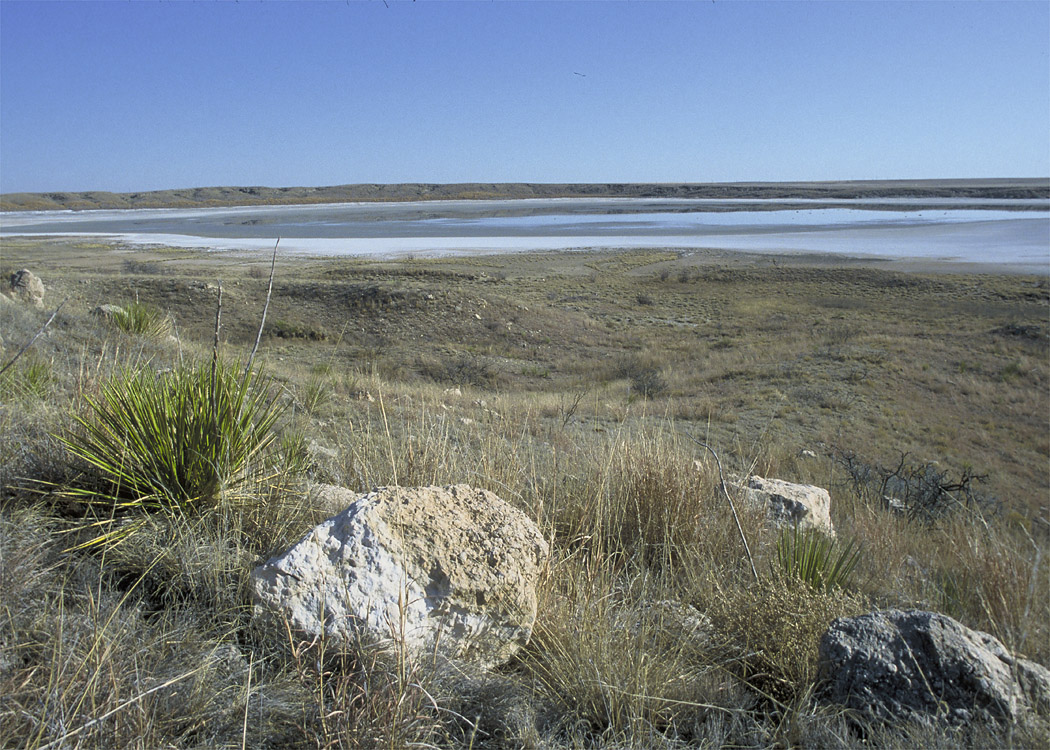
Upper Goose Lake, Muleshoe National Wildlife Refuge

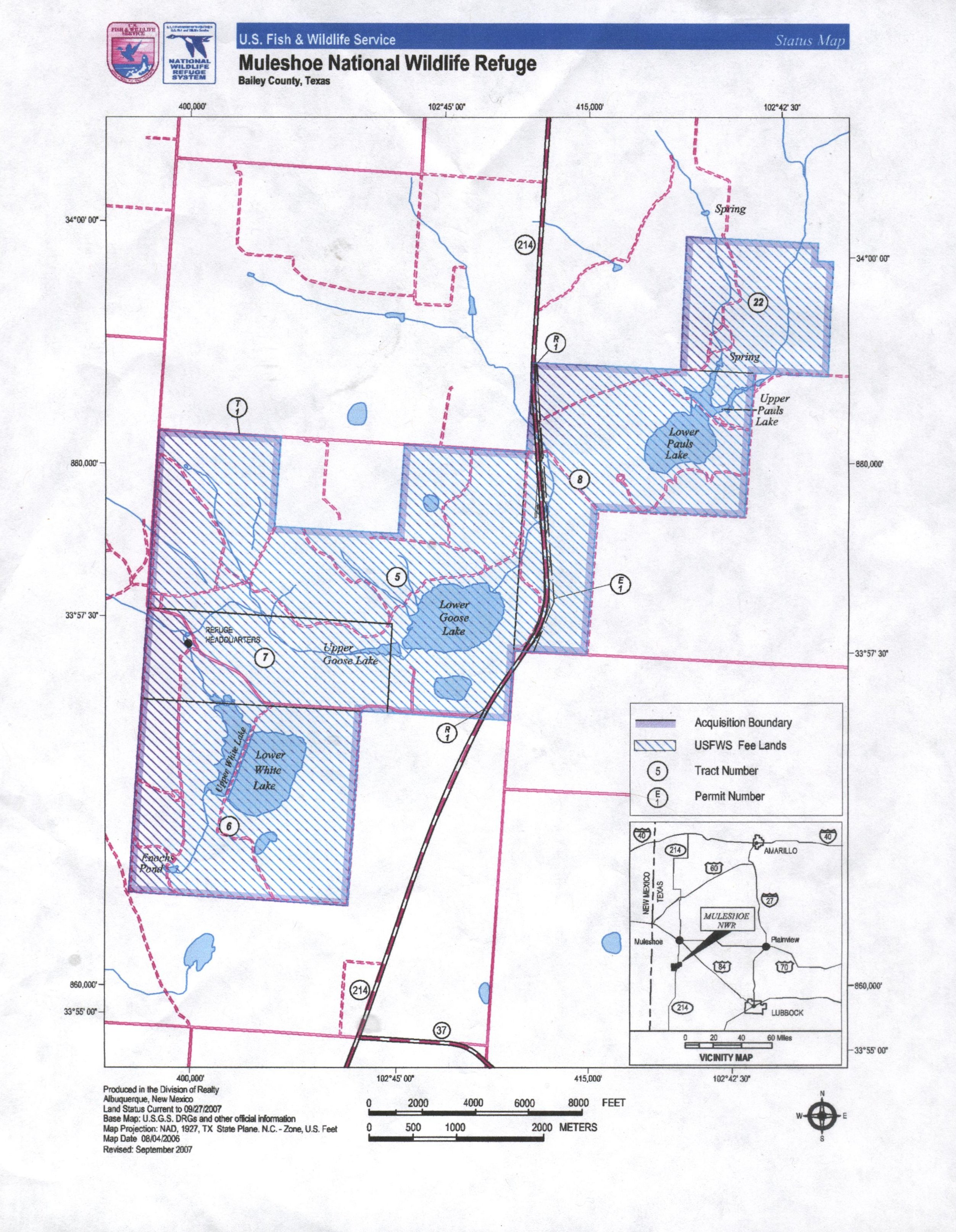
Official map of refuge

== See also ==
- Grulla National Wildlife Refuge
- Buffalo Lake National Wildlife Refuge
- Blackwater Draw
- Llano Estacado
