= U.S. Route 385 in Texas =

Segment of American highway

U.S. Highway 385
- US 385 highlighted in red

Route information
- Maintained by TxDOT
- Length: 441.309 mi (710.218 km)
- Existed: 1927–present

Major junctions
- South end: Big Bend National Park
- US 90 in Marathon; I-10 in Fort Stockton; I-20 in Odessa; US 62 from Seminole to Brownfield; US 82 in Brownfield; US 84 in Littlefield; US 70 in Springlake; US 60 in Hereford; I-40 in Vega; US 87 from Hartley to Dalhart
- North end: US 385 at Oklahoma state line

Location
- Country: United States
- State: Texas
- Counties: Brewster, Pecos, Crockett, Upton, Crane, Ector, Andrews, Gaines, Terry, Hockley, Lamb, Castro, Deaf Smith, Oldham, Hartley, Dallam

Highway system
- United States Numbered Highway System; List; Special; Divided; Highways in Texas; Interstate; US; State; Former; Toll; Loops; Spurs; FM/RM; Park; Rec
← US 380	→ US 54

U.S. Route 385 (US 385) is a north-south U.S. highway that runs from Big Bend National Park in Texas to Deadwood, South Dakota. In Texas, the highway runs from Big Bend National Park to the Oklahoma state line, north of Dalhart. US 385 is part of the La Entrada al Pacifico trade corridor from Interstate 10 in Fort Stockton to Interstate 20 in Odessa.

== Route description ==
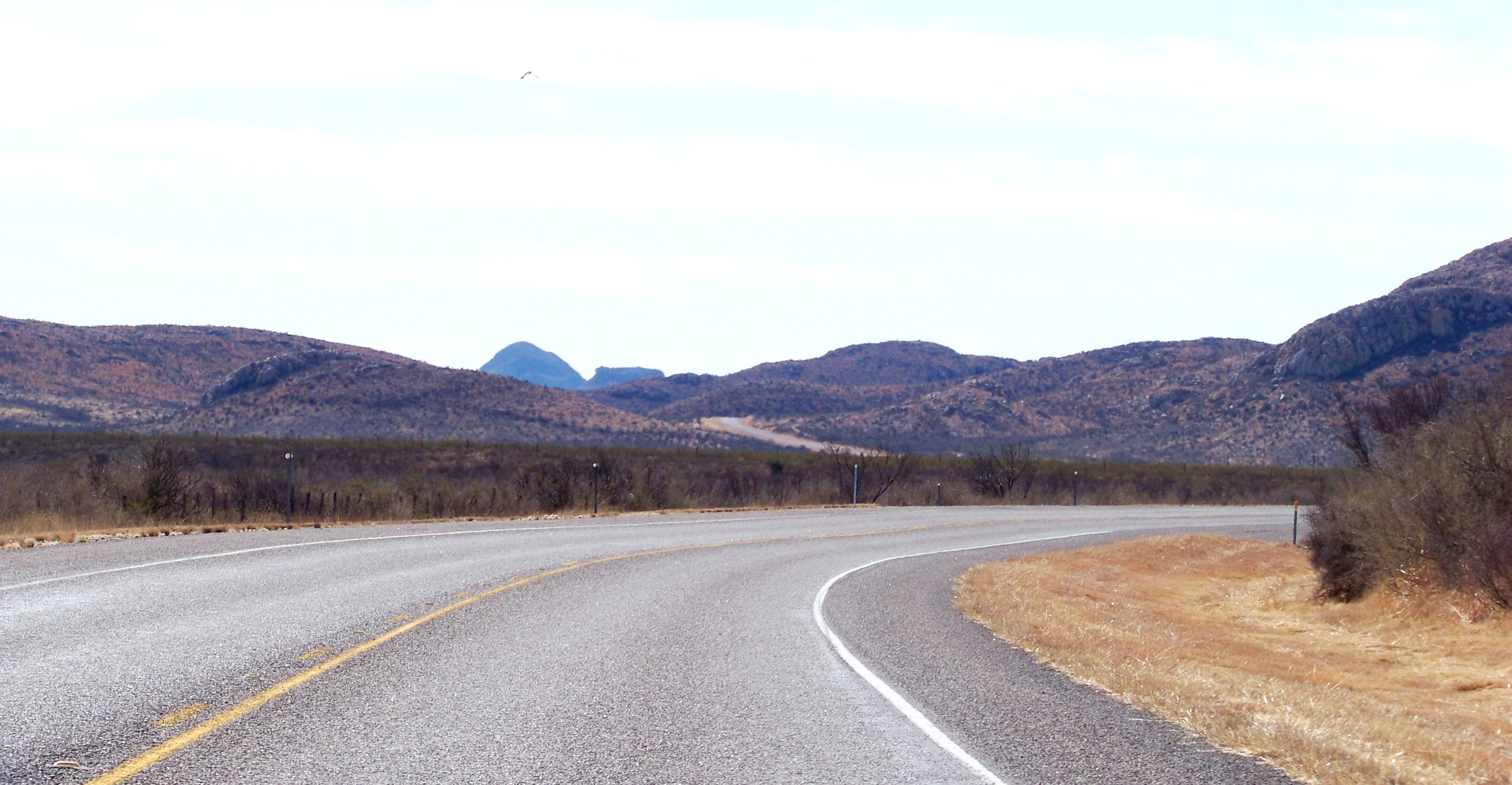
US 385 between Marathon and Big Bend National Park

US 385 begins at Big Bend National Park near the Persimmon Gap Visitor Center. About 40 miles to the north, the highway intersects US 90 in the town of Marathon, sharing a short overlap with that highway. In Fort Stockton, US 385 begins an overlap with Interstate 10 and US 67. At I-10 exit 273, US 67/385 end their overlap with the interstate, running in a northeast direction. US 385 ends its overlap with US 67 in McCamey, running in a slight northwest direction. The highway intersects with Interstate 20, entering into the city of Odessa. US 385 runs through the city, leaving it just south of the northern intersection with Loop 338.

In Seminole, US 385 begins an overlap with US 62, with the two highways running through Seagraves together. US 62 leaves the highway in Brownfield, with US 385 running in a mostly north direction. The highway enters the town of Levelland, running along the western boundary of South Plains College; after intersecting with SH 114 US 385 leaves the town. In Littlefield, US 385 shares a short overlap with Loop 430 around the downtown area. North of Littlefield, the highway runs through mainly rural areas, passing through the towns of Springlake and Sunnyside. North of Dimmitt, US 385 begins running through the panhandle section of Texas and becomes less rural. North of Hereford, the highway becomes a rural route once again. From Vega to Channing US 385 makes a backwards c-shape, crossing the Canadian River in the process. US 385 runs through the Rita Blanca National Grassland, before entering into Oklahoma.

== Major intersections ==
County	Location	mi	km	Destinations	Notes
Brewster	Big Bend	0.0	0.0	Main Park Road	Southern terminus of US 385
Brewster		0.8	1.3	RM 2627 east – Black Gap Area, La Linda	
Brewster	Marathon	39.7	63.9	US 90 west – Marathon	South end of US 90 overlap
Brewster		40.7	65.5	US 90 east – Sanderson	North end of US 90 overlap
Pecos	Fort Stockton	96.5	155.3	Spur 194 west	
Pecos	Fort Stockton	97.5	156.9	I-10 BL west / US 285 north (Dickinson Boulevard) – Balmorhea	South end of BL I-10 / US 285 overlap
Pecos	Fort Stockton	97.6	157.1	FM 1053 north (Main Street)	
Pecos	Fort Stockton	98.0	157.7	US 285 south – Sanderson	North end of US 285 overlap
Pecos	Fort Stockton	99.4	160.0	I-10 west / US 67 south	North end of BL I-10 overlap; south end of I-10 / US 67 overlap; I-10 exit 261
Pecos		102.1	164.3	Warnock Road	I-10 exit 264
Pecos		109.8	176.7	University Road	I-10 exit 272
Pecos		110.9	178.5	I-10 east – Ozona	North end of I-10 overlap; I-10 exit 273
Pecos	Girvin	131.9	212.3	FM 11 – Imperial, Bakersfield	
Crane	No major junctions				
Upton	McCamey	143.0	230.1	US 67 north / FM 305 south – Rankin	North end of US 67 overlap; access to McCamey Hospital
Crane	Crane	164.0	263.9	SH 329 (6th Street) – Grandfalls, Rankin	
Crane		173.1	278.6	FM 1233 west	
Ector		184.1	296.3	FM 1787 east – Pleasant Farms	
Ector		191.2	307.7	Loop 338	
Ector		191.6	308.4	FM 1882 north	
Ector	Odessa	194.6	313.2	I-20 / Pool Road – Monahans, Midland	I-20 exit 116
Ector	Odessa	196.0	315.4	I-20 BL (2nd Street)	BL I-20 is former US 80; access to Medical Center Hospital
Ector	Odessa	197.2	317.4	Spur 450 west (Kermit Highway) – Kermit	
Ector	Odessa	198.8	319.9	SH 191 (42nd Street)	
Ector		204.4	328.9	Loop 338	
Ector		208.9	336.2	SH 158 – Goldsmith, Gardendale	Interchange
Andrews	Andrews	229.6	369.5	Loop 1910 (South Mustang Drive) to SH 115 / SH 176	Access to Permian Regional Medical Center
Andrews	Andrews	230.5	371.0	SH 115 / SH 176 (Broadway Street) – Kermit, Big Spring	
Andrews		233.0	375.0	Loop 1910	
Andrews		238.4	383.7	FM 1967 west – Frankel City	
Gaines		249.4	401.4	FM 2885 north	
Gaines		257.3	414.1	FM 1788 south	
Gaines	Seminole	258.4	415.9	FM 181 south (South Avenue G) to US 62 / US 180 / SH 214	
Gaines	Seminole	258.9	416.7	US 62 west / US 180 to SH 214	South end of US 62 overlap; access to Seminole Hospital
Gaines	Seagraves	276.4	444.8	SH 83 – Denver City, Welch	
Terry	Wellman	286.9	461.7	FM 213 / FM 303 south	South end of FM 303 overlap
Terry		291.0	468.3	FM 303 north	North end of FM 303 overlap
Terry	Brownfield	298.0	479.6	SH 137 north / FM 403 south – Levelland	South end of SH 137 overlap
Terry	Brownfield	298.2	479.9	SH 137 south – Lamesa	North end of SH 137 overlap
Terry	Brownfield	299.6	482.2	US 82 west / US 380 west (Main Street) – Plains	South end of US 82/380 overlap
Terry	Brownfield	299.8	482.5	US 380 east (Tahoka Highway) – Terry County Airport	North end of US 380 overlap
Terry	Brownfield	300.6	483.8	US 62 east / US 82 east – Lubbock	North end of US 62/82 overlap
Terry		303.0	487.6	SH 137 south – Lamesa	
Terry		306.3	492.9	FM 2196 west	
Terry		310.5	499.7	FM 211	
Terry		314.5	506.1	FM 3261 east – Lockettville	
Hockley		316.7	509.7	FM 41 – Ropesville	
Hockley		320.2	515.3	FM 301 west – Sundown	
Hockley		323.5	520.6	FM 1585	
Hockley	Levelland	328.4	528.5	FM 300 (Avenue H)	
Hockley	Levelland	329.8	530.8	Bus. SH 114 west (Houston Street)	South end of Bus. SH 114 overlap
Hockley	Levelland	330.2	531.4	SH 114 – Morton, Lubbock	North end of Bus. SH 114 overlap
Hockley		334.9	539.0	FM 2306 west	
Hockley		336.1	540.9	FM 1294 east – Shallowater	
Hockley		343.9	553.5	FM 597 west	South end of FM 597 overlap
Hockley		345.0	555.2	FM 597 east – Anton	North end of FM 597 overlap
Lamb	Littlefield	352.1	566.7	US 84 – Muleshoe, Lubbock	Interchange; access to Lamb Healthcare Center
Lamb	Littlefield	353.1	568.3	FM 54 (Waylon Jennings Boulevard)	
Lamb	Littlefield	353.5	568.9	Loop 430 east – Lubbock	South end of Loop 430 overlap
Lamb	Littlefield	353.6	569.1	Loop 430 west	North end of Loop 430 overlap
Lamb		356.9	574.4	FM 2197 east	
Lamb		359.7	578.9	FM 37 – Amherst	
Lamb	Springlake	375.1	603.7	US 70 – Muleshoe, Plainview	
Lamb		377.1	606.9	FM 2901 west	
Castro		385.3	620.1	FM 145 – Lazbuddie, Hart	
Castro		388.4	625.1	FM 1524 west – Flagg	
Castro	Dimmitt	396.2	637.6	SH 194 east – Plainview	
Castro	Dimmitt	396.5	638.1	FM 3215 west	
Castro	Dimmitt	397.4	639.6	SH 86	
Castro	Dimmitt	397.7	640.0	FM 2392 west	Access to Plains Memorial Hospital
Castro		403.9	650.0	FM 2397 – Easter	
Deaf Smith		411.1	661.6	FM 2943 north to US 60 east – Canyon	
Deaf Smith		415.5	668.7	FM 1055 south	
Deaf Smith	Hereford	417.5	671.9	US 60 (First Street) – Friona, Canyon	
Deaf Smith	Hereford	418.2	673.0	FM 1058 west (West Park Avenue) / Spur 211 east (East Park Avenue) – Grady, Canyon	
Deaf Smith		429.3	690.9	FM 1057 south / FM 1062 east – Canyon	
Deaf Smith		432.4	695.9	FM 1412 west – Walcott	
Deaf Smith		437.4	703.9	FM 2587	
Oldham		447.1	719.5	I-40	I-40 exit 36
Oldham	Vega	447.6	720.3	I-40 BL (Vega Boulevard) – Adrian, Wildorado	Former US 66
Oldham		469.3	755.3	RM 1061 south – Amarillo	
Oldham		471.5	758.8	Spur 233 east – Boys Ranch	
Hartley	Channing	483.1	777.5	SH 354 east / FM 767 west – Nara Visa, Four Way	
Hartley		486.6	783.1	FM 722 east – Dumas	
Hartley	Hartley	497.0	799.8	US 87 south – Dumas	Interchange; south end of US 87 overlap
Hartley	Hartley	498.1	801.6	FM 998 north / FM 807 north	
Dallam	Dalhart	509.7	820.3	FM 281 – Etter	
Dallam	Dalhart	512.0	824.0	Bus. US 87 north (7th Street) / Tennessee Avenue	
Dallam	Dalhart	512.5	824.8	US 54 – Tucumcari, Stratford	Access to Dalhart Municipal Airport
Dallam	Dalhart	512.7	825.1	US 87 north – Clayton	North end of US 87 overlap
Dallam	Dalhart	513.8	826.9	Spur 17 west / Truck Line Road	
Dallam		540.1	869.2	FM 296 west – Texline	
Dallam		543.3	874.4	US 385 north – Boise City	Continuation into Oklahoma
1.000 mi = 1.609 km; 1.000 km = 0.621 mi: Concurrency terminus

== See also ==
U.S. Route 385
Previous state: Terminus	Texas	Next state: Oklahoma
