= Dimmitt =

Dimmitt may refer to:

- Dimmitt, Texas
- James Dimmitt (1888–1957), Australian politician
- Philip Dimmitt (1801–1841), major figure in the Texas Revolution
- Dimmitt (meteorite), fell close to Dimmitt, Texas

== See also ==
- Dimmit County, Texas
