= Dimmitt High School =

Location
- 1405 Western Circle Drive; Dimmitt, Texas 79027-2803; United States; 34.5434°N 102.3301°W

Information
- School type: Public high school
- School district: Dimmitt Independent School District
- Principal: David Cox
- Teaching staff: 30.53 (on an FTE basis)
- Grades: 9-12
- Enrollment: 313 (2023-2024)
- Student to teacher ratio: 10.25
- Colors: Purple & White
- Athletics conference: UIL Class 3A
- Mascot: Bobcats
- Yearbook: The Bobcat
- Website: Dimmitt High School website

Dimmitt High School is a public high school located in Dimmitt, Texas (USA). It is classified as a 3A school by the UIL. The school is part of the Dimmitt Independent School District located in central Castro County. For the 2021-2022 school year, the school was given a "C" by the Texas Education Agency.

== Athletics ==
The Dimmitt Bobcats compete in these sports

- Baseball
- Basketball
- Cross country
- Football
- Golf
- Powerlifting
- Softball
- Tennis
- Track and field
- Volleyball

=== State titles ===
- Boys basketball -
  - 1952(1A), 1975(2A), 1982(3A), 1983(3A)
- Girls basketball -
  - 1954(1A), 1955(1A), 1993(3A)

== Notable alumni ==
- Lometa Odom (1933—2017) basketball player and coach, member of the Women's Basketball Hall of Fame
- Junior Coffey
