= Noel Johnson (basketball) =

American basketball player and coach (1972–2020)

Biographical details
- Born: December 1, 1971; Shamrock, Texas
- Died: June 9, 2020 (aged 47)

Playing career
- 1991–1995: Texas Tech

Coaching career (HC unless noted)
- 1998–2007: Texas State (assistant)
- 2007–2008: North Texas (assistant)
- 2009–2020: Midwestern State

Head coaching record
- Overall: 158–164 (.491)

Accomplishments and honors

Awards
- As player: NCAA champion (1993)

Noel Dawn Johnson (December 1, 1972 – June 9, 2020) was an American basketball player and the head coach of the Midwestern State Mustangs women's basketball team. She played for the national championship Texas Tech Lady Raiders in 1993.

== Early years ==
Johnson was a West Texas native, born in Shamrock, Texas, to Dean and Agatha Johnson, and then growing up in Kelton, Texas. During her junior year in high school, her family moved to Nazareth, Texas, where she played basketball for Nazareth High. She helped her team win two class 1-A state titles in basketball.

== College ==
Johnson attended Texas Tech University and played for four years on the women's basketball team. The Lady Raiders won the Southwest Conference all four years, were invited to the NCAA postseason tournament all four years, making it at least as far as the Sweet Sixteen each year, and won the national championship in 1993. The team was coached by Marsha Sharp who would go on to be inducted into the Women's Basketball Hall of Fame.

Johnson played point guard during her four years at Texas Tech. In the first nine years that Texas Tech played in the Southwest conference, they finished second or third each year. In Johnson's freshman year, the team recorded a record of 27–5 and won the first of five consecutive conference championships. Sheryl Swoopes had transferred to Texas Tech from South Plains College, and the team went on to earn a first round bye in the NCAA tournament in 1992, then beating Santa Clara in the second round to reach the Sweet 16. They lost the next game to Stanford who went on to win the national championship that year. They ended the season ranked number 12 in the AP rankings, their highest ever ranking. In her freshman year Johnson hit 23 of her 53 point field-goal attempts resulting in a percentage of 46.0%, the highest on the team.

In her sophomore year, the team again won the Southwest conference regular-season tournament and the postseason tournament. The team earned the second seed in the West regional of the 1993 NCAA Division I women's basketball tournament behind the previous year's national champion Stanford. However, Colorado upset Stanford in the regional semi finals. Texas Tech earned a first-round bye then beat Washington by six points in the second round, and went on to beat Southern California by 20 points in the regional semi-finals. they faced Colorado in the regional finals but won easily by 25 points sending Texas Tech to the first-ever Final Four. In the national semi finals, Texas Tech faced Vanderbilt, also appearing in the first Final Four but won easily 60–46. The championship game was against Ohio State who had won their national semi final in overtime. While the star of the championship game was clearly Swoopes, who scored an NCAA record 47 points in the game, Johnson hit four free throws to give Texas Tech an eight-point lead with only 20 seconds left to play. Those free throws were key, as Ohio State hit two three pointers in the final 10 seconds. Texas Tech ended up with the 84–82 victory when in their first ever national championship.

In her junior year, Johnson helped lead her team to another NCAA tournament. They reached the Sweet 16 but were upset by Alabama in the regional semi finals. As a senior, Johnson helped her team to a 33–4 record. The team again made the NCAA tournament and reached the regional semi finals where they lost to Tennessee.

== Post-graduate ==
Johnson earned a master's degree in education at Texas State in 2002.

== Texas Tech Stats ==
Legend
| GP | Games played | GS | Games started | MPG | Minutes per game |
| FG% | Field goal percentage | 3P% | 3-point field goal percentage | FT% | Free throw percentage |
| RPG | Rebounds per game | APG | Assists per game | SPG | Steals per game |
| BPG | Blocks per game | PPG | Points per game | **Bold** | Career high |

| Year | Team | GP | Points | FG% | 3P% | FT% | RPG | APG | SPG | BPG | PPG |
|---|---|---|---|---|---|---|---|---|---|---|---|
| 1992 | Texas Tech | 31 | 175 | **48.3%** | **46.0%** | 70.8% | 2.6 | 2.4 | 1.5 | 0.1 | 5.6 |
| 1993 | Texas Tech | 34 | 300 | 46.1% | 40.7% | **76.4%** | 3.8 | **3.9** | 1.9 | 0.2 | 8.8 |
| 1994 | Texas Tech | 33 | 395 | 42.9% | 43.8% | 67.3% | **4.6** | 3.3 | 2 | 0.2 | 12 |
| 1995 | Texas Tech | **37** | 374 | 44.6% | 41.2% | 58.3% | 4.1 | 2.8 | **2.3** | 0 | **10.1** |
| | | 135 | 1244 | 45.4% | 42.8% | 67.9% | 3.8 | 3.1 | 1.9 | 0.1 | 9.2 |

== Awards and honors ==
- 2005—Texas Tech Hall of Honor
- 2012—Lone Star Conference Coach of the Year
- 2013—Texas Association of Basketball Coaches’ Small School Coach of the Year
- 2018—Texas High School Basketball Hall of Fame
- 2019—Southwest Conference Hall of Fame

== Coaching career ==
Johnson served as an administrative intern at Texas Tech, and served as a coach and counselor at the basketball camps run by Texas Tech head coach Marsha Sharp between 1992 and 1997, but her first formal coaching position was at Texas State. She was named as an assistant coach for the women's basketball team in 1998. she continued at this school, becoming the associate head coach, and remained until 2007. while she was at Texas State, she helped the team when the Southland Conference Championship in 2003. In 2007, she took a position as an assistant coach at North Texas.

In 2009, Johnson was named as the head coach at Midwestern State. She served as the head coach for 12 seasons. although she was diagnosed with ovarian cancer in 2019 she continued to coach until January 30, 2020, and returned to the school to participate in senior day activities. Her teams won 159 games while she was head coach, making her the winningest coach in school history. During her tenure as head coach, every one of the 37 athletes who completed their eligibility earned a degree. She was named the Lone Star Conference Coach of the year in 2012.

== Coaching statistics ==
Record table
| Season | Team | Overall | Conference | Standing | Postseason |
|---|---|---|---|---|---|
**Midwestern State University** (Lone Star Conference) (2008–2020)
| 2008–09 | Midwestern | 8–18 | 3–9 | 6th | |
| 2009–10 | Midwestern | 9–17 | 2–10 | 7th | |
| 2010–11 | Midwestern | 10–16 | 6–8 | 5th | |
| 2011–12 | Midwestern | 19–8 | 15–5 | 3rd | |
| 2012–13 | Midwestern | 26–6 | 16–4 | 1st | NCAA II South Central Finals |
| 2013–14 | Midwestern | 18–12 | 9–7 | 4th | NCAA II South Central Quarterfinals |
| 2014–15 | Midwestern | 23–7 | 8–18 | 2nd | NCAA II South Central Quarterfinals |
| 2015–16 | Midwestern | 5–22 | 4–12 | 8th | |
| 2016–17 | Midwestern | 8–18 | 5–15 | 9th | |
| 2017–18 | Midwestern | 13–14 | 10–10 | 7th | |
| 2018–19 | Midwestern | 12-16 | 9–11 | 6th | |
| 2019–20 | Midwestern | 7–10 | 5–8 | | |
| Midwestern: | | 158–164 (.491) | | | |
| Total: | | 158–164 (.491) | | | |
National champion Postseason invitational champion Conference regular season champion Conference regular season and conference tournament champion Division regular season champion Division regular season and conference tournament champion Conference tournament champion

== Death ==
In April 2019 Johnson was diagnosed with stage 4 ovarian cancer. She battled the cancer for over a year, but lost her battle in June 2020 at the age of 47. Marsha Sharp issued a statement:

I am heartbroken today. Noel Johnson is one of the most beloved players in the history of Texas Tech women's basketball. Our hearts and prayers go out to Noel's family, friends and the entire Midwestern family. Rest In Peace number 23.
