= Dodd, Texas =

- Unincorporated community
- Location within Texas Location within the United States
- Coordinates: 34°20′6″N 102°28′43″W
- Country: United States
- State: Texas
- County: Castro
- Elevation: 3,806 ft (1,160 m)
- Time zone: UTC-6 (Central (CST))
  - Summer (DST): UTC-5 (CDT)
- Area code: 806
- GNIS feature ID: 1379670

Dodd is an unincorporated community in Castro County, Texas, United States. According to the Handbook of Texas, the community had an estimated population of 15 in 2000.

== History ==
Dodd was named after a family of local settlers in the early 1900s. The settlement had a store, a grain elevator, and a gin serving 35 people from the 1970s to 1990. Its population went down to 15 in 2000.

A mausoleum can be found in a private cemetery in northern Dodd. It is said to be the grave of someone named I.D. Beasley.

== Geography ==
Dodd is located on Farm to Market Road 303, 18 mi (29 km) southwest of Dimmitt in the southwestern corner of Castro County.

== Education ==
Schoolchildren in Dodd attended Big Square school, located north of the community, until 1945 when it joined the Dimmitt and Springlake-Earth School Districts.

Today, the community is served by the Springlake-Earth Independent School District.
