= Sunnyside, Castro County, Texas =

- Unincorporated community
- Location within Texas Location within the United States
- Coordinates: 34°20′53″N 102°18′13″W
- Country: United States
- State: Texas
- County: Castro
- Elevation: 3,734 ft (1,138 m)

Population
  - Total: 22,562
  - Density: 3,553.980/sq mi (1,372.1994/km^{2})
- Time zone: UTC-6 (Central (CST))
  - Summer (DST): UTC-5 (CDT)
- Area code: 806
- GNIS feature ID: 1380630

Sunnyside is an unincorporated community in Castro County, Texas, United States. According to the Handbook of Texas, the community had an estimated population of 80 in 2000.

== Geography ==
Sunnyside is located on U.S. Route 385, 15 mi (24 km) south of Dimmitt in Castro County.

== Education ==
Today, the community is served by the Dimmitt Independent School District and the Springlake-Earth Independent School District.
