= Frio, Texas =

- Unincorporated community
- Location within Texas Location within the United States
- Coordinates: 34°42′55″N 102°24′27″W
- Country: United States
- State: Texas
- County: Castro
- Elevation: 3,855 ft (1,175 m)
- Time zone: UTC-6 (Central (CST))
  - Summer (DST): UTC-5 (CDT)
- Area code: 806
- GNIS feature ID: 2034715

Frio is an unincorporated community in Castro County, Texas, United States. According to the Handbook of Texas, the community had an estimated population of 15 in 2000.

== Geography ==
Frio is located on Farm to Market Road 1055 on the Frio Draw, 12 mi (19 km) northwest of Dimmitt, in northwestern Castro County.

== Education ==
Today, the community is served by the Hereford Independent School District. Children who live in the community attend West Central Elementary School, Hereford Junior High School, and Hereford High School.
