= Summerfield, Texas =

- Unincorporated community
- Location within the state of Texas Summerfield (the United States)
- Coordinates: 34°44′17″N 102°30′26″W
- Country: United States
- State: Texas
- County: Castro

Area
  - Total: 0.15 sq mi (0.40 km^{2})
- Elevation: 3,937 ft (1,200 m)
- Time zone: UTC-6 (Central (CST))
  - Summer (DST): UTC-5 (CDT)
- ZIP codes: 79085
- FIPS code: 1380625

Summerfield is an unincorporated community in northwestern Castro County, Texas, United States. It lies along U.S. Route 60 northwest of the city of Dimmitt, the county seat of Castro County. Its elevation is 3,937 feet (1,200 m). Although Summerfield is unincorporated, it has a post office, with the ZIP code of 79085.

Summerfield was founded as Boom in the late 1890s; it was renamed for surveyor John Summerfield in 1907 because there was another Texas community named Boom. The community was built along the Pecos & Northern Texas Railway, near Castro Creek and the Deaf Smith and Parmer county lines.

As of 2020, it has a population of less than 100.

== Climate ==
According to the Köppen Climate Classification system, Summerfield has a semi-arid climate, abbreviated "BSk" on climate maps.

== Demographics ==
Historical population
Census	Pop.	Note	%±
2020	34		—
U.S. Decennial Census; 1850–1900 1910; 1920 1930 1940; 1950 1960 1970; 1980 1990 2000; 2010 2020

Summerfield first appeared as a census designated place in the 2020 U.S. census.

=== 2020 Census ===
Summerfield CDP, Texas – Racial and ethnic composition Note: the US Census treats Hispanic/Latino as an ethnic category. This table excludes Latinos from the racial categories and assigns them to a separate category. Hispanics/Latinos may be of any race.
Race / Ethnicity (NH = Non-Hispanic)	Pop 2020	% 2020
White alone (NH)	18	52.94%
Black or African American alone (NH)	1	2.94%
Native American or Alaska Native alone (NH)	1	2.94%
Asian alone (NH)	0	0.00%
Native Hawaiian or Pacific Islander alone (NH)	0	0.00%
Other race alone (NH)	0	0.00%
Mixed race or Multiracial (NH)	3	8.82%
Hispanic or Latino (any race)	11	32.35%
Total	34	100.00%
