= Texas State Highway 194 =

State highway in Texas

State Highway 194
- SH 194, highlighted in red

Route information
- Maintained by TxDOT
- Length: 42.72 mi (68.75 km)
- Existed: by 1933–present

Major junctions
- Northwest end: US 385 near Dimmitt
- I-27 / US 87 in Plainview; US 70 in Plainview
- Southeast end: FM 3466 in Plainview

Location
- Country: United States
- State: Texas

Highway system
- Highways in Texas; Interstate; US; State; Former; Toll; Loops; Spurs; FM/RM; Park; Rec
← SH 193	→ SH 195

State Highway 194 (SH 194) is a 42.72-mile (68.75 km) state highway that travels from near Dimmitt southeast to Plainview in the Texas Panhandle.

== History ==
SH 194 was designated on its current route on February 9, 1933. On September 26, 1939, the designation was extended from Plainview southeast through Petersburg, then southwest through Slaton to Tahoka, replacing SH 280. On October 22, 1940, the section of SH 194 from 3.6 miles north of the Hale–Lubbock county line to Slaton was cancelled. On November 22, 1940, the section from Plainview to 3.6 miles north of the Hale–Lubbock county line was cancelled. On March 6, 1941, the section of SH 194 from Slaton to Tahoka was cancelled. The current route parallels the Burlington Northern railway along its entire route, except for the final half mile in Plainview.

== Major intersections ==
County	Location	mi	km	Destinations	Notes
Castro		0.0	0.0	US 385 (Andrews Highway)	Northwestern terminus
Castro	Hart	15.1	24.3	FM 168 / Broadway	
Castro		15.7	25.3	FM 145 / Main Street	
Swisher	No major junctions				
Hale		25.7	41.4	FM 2881	
Hale		25.9	41.7	FM 179	
Hale	Edmonson	29.3	47.2	FM 1424	Runs concurrently to SH 194 for 1.0 mile (1.6 km)
Hale		30.4	48.9	FM 788	
Hale	Plainview	39.9	64.2	I-27 / US 87 (Marshall Formby Memorial Highway)	
Hale	Plainview	42.0	67.6	US 70 / W 5th Street	
Hale	Plainview	42.7	68.7	FM 3466 / SW 3rd Street	Southern terminus
1.000 mi = 1.609 km; 1.000 km = 0.621 mi
