= Hart Junior-Senior High School =

Hart Junior/Senior High School

Location
- 710 South 2nd Street; Hart, Texas 79043-0490; United States; 34.376406°N 102.110091°W

Information
- School type: Public high school
- School district: Hart Independent School District
- Principal: Ramona Neudorf
- Teaching staff: 17.68 (on an FTE basis)
- Grades: PK-12
- Enrollment: 212 (2023-2024)
- Student to teacher ratio: 11.99
- Colors: Maroon & White
- Athletics conference: UIL Class A
- Mascot: Longhorn
- Yearbook: Longhorn
- Website: Hart Junior/Senior High School

Hart Junior/Senior High School is a public high school located in Hart, Texas (USA) and classified as a 1A school by the UIL. It is part of the Hart Independent School District located in central Castro County. For the 2021-2022 school year, the school was given a "B" by the Texas Education Agency.

== Athletics ==
The Hart Longhorns compete in these sports -

- Basketball
- Cross Country
- 6-Man Football
- Golf
- Tennis
- Track and Field

=== State Titles ===
- Boys Cross Country -
  - 2006(1A)
