= Edmonson, Texas =

- Town
- Location of Edmonson, Texas

- Location of Edmonson Edmonson (the United States)
- Coordinates: 34°16′54″N 101°54′4″W
- Country: United States
- State: Texas
- County: Hale

Area
  - Total: 0.43 sq mi (1.11 km^{2})
  - Land: 0.43 sq mi (1.11 km^{2})
  - Water: 0 sq mi (0.00 km^{2})
- Elevation: 3,504 ft (1,068 m)

Population (2020)
  - Total: 86
  - Density: 200/sq mi (77/km^{2})
- Time zone: UTC-6 (Central (CST))
  - Summer (DST): UTC-5 (CDT)
- ZIP code: 79032
- Area code: 806
- FIPS code: 48-22708
- GNIS feature ID: 1356826

Edmonson is a town in Hale County, Texas, United States. The population was 86 at the 2020 census.

== Geography ==
Edmonson is located in northern Hale County. Texas State Highway 194 runs through the town, leading southeast 13 miles (21 km) to Plainview, the county seat, and northwest 30 miles (48 km) to Dimmitt.

According to the United States Census Bureau, Edmonson has a total area of 0.42 square miles (1.1 km^{2}), all of it land.

== Demographics ==
Historical population
Census	Pop.	Note	%±
1970	99		—
1980	291		193.9%
1990	107		−63.2%
2000	123		15.0%
2010	111		−9.8%
2020	86		−22.5%
U.S. Decennial Census

=== 2020 census ===
Edmonson racial composition (NH = Non-Hispanic) (Note: Note: the US Census treats Hispanic/Latino as an ethnic category. This table excludes Latinos from the racial categories and assigns them to a separate category. Hispanics/Latinos can be of any race.)
Race	Number	Percentage
White (NH)	40	46.51%
Hispanic or Latino	46	53.49%
Total	86	

As of the 2020 United States census, there were 86 people, 34 households, and 20 families residing in the town.

=== 2000 census ===
As of the census of 2000, there were 123 people, 37 households, and 34 families residing in the town. The population density was 283.4 inhabitants per square mile (109.4/km^{2}). There were 43 housing units at an average density of 99.1 per square mile (38.3/km^{2}). The racial makeup of the town was 85.37% White, 14.63% from other races. Hispanic or Latino of any race were 49.59% of the population.

There were 37 households, out of which 48.6% had children under the age of 18 living with them, 81.1% were married couples living together, 2.7% had a female householder with no husband present, and 8.1% were non-families. 8.1% of all households were made up of individuals, and 8.1% had someone living alone who was 65 years of age or older. The average household size was 3.32 and the average family size was 3.50.

In the town, the population was spread out, with 34.1% under the age of 18, 9.8% from 18 to 24, 25.2% from 25 to 44, 17.9% from 45 to 64, and 13.0% who were 65 years of age or older. The median age was 30 years. For every 100 females, there were 105.0 males. For every 100 females age 18 and over, there were 102.5 males.

The median income for a household in the town was $31,250, and the median income for a family was $29,583. Males had a median income of $21,389 versus $9,773 for females. The per capita income for the town was $9,857. There were 6.3% of families and 13.7% of the population living below the poverty line, including 17.9% of under eighteens and 16.7% of those over 64.

== Education ==
The town of Edmonson is served by the Plainview Independent School District.
