= Flagg, Texas =

- Unincorporated community
- Location within Texas Location within the United States
- Coordinates: 34°25′34″N 102°24′36″W
- Country: United States
- State: Texas
- County: Castro
- Elevation: 3,796 ft (1,157 m)
- Time zone: UTC-6 (Central (CST))
  - Summer (DST): UTC-5 (CDT)
- Area code: 806
- GNIS feature ID: 1379774

Flagg is an unincorporated community in Castro County, Texas, United States. According to the Handbook of Texas, the community had an estimated population of 30 in 2000.

== Geography ==
Flagg is located at the intersection of Farm to Market Roads 1055 and 1524, 12 mi (19 km) southeast of Dimmitt, 34 mi (55 km) east of Bovina, and 23 mi (37 km) south of Hereford in southwestern Castro County.

== Education ==
In 1925, Flagg had a school and the school district was formally created four years later. The community joined the Dimmitt Independent School District in 1945.
