= Arney, Texas =

Ghost town in Texas, US

Arney
- Ghost town
- Location in Texas
- Coordinates: 34.6872861°N 102.1029694°W
- Country: United States
- State: Texas
- County: Castro
- Elevation: 3,793 ft (1,156 m)
- USGS Feature ID: 1381362

Arney is a ghost town in Castro County, Texas, United States. Founded 1901, it was named for the Arney settler family. A post office operated from 1902 to 1912, located in postmaster William D. Robinson's house. A school—built on land donated by C. H. Cox—was built in 1905, and was consolidated by Dimmitt Independent School District in 1945, leaving the schoolhouse—received a placard from the Texas Historical Commission in 1985—as a community center. By 2000, it was not considered a community.
