= Hart High School =

Hart High School may refer to:

- William S. Hart High School (California), Newhall, Santa Clarita, California
- Hart High School (Michigan), Hart, Michigan
- Hart County High School (Kentucky), Munfordville, Kentucky
- Hart County High School (Georgia), Hartwell, Georgia
- Hart Junior-Senior High School, Hart, Texas
