= Nazareth High School (Texas) =

Location
- 101 South 1st Street; Nazareth, Texas 79063; United States; 34.544024°N 102.100637°W

Information
- School type: Public high school
- School district: Nazareth Independent School District
- Principal: Dr. Aaron Hunt
- Faculty: 21.39 (on an FTE basis)
- Grades: PK-12
- Enrollment: 247 (2023-2024)
- Student to teacher ratio: 11.55
- Colors: Blue & Gold
- Athletics conference: UIL Class A
- Mascot: Swifts/Swiftettes
- Yearbook: The Swift
- Website: Nazareth High School

Nazareth High School or Nazareth School is a public high school located in Nazareth, Texas (USA) and classified as a 1A school by the UIL. It is part of the Nazareth Independent School District located in east central Castro County. For the 2021–2022 school year, the school was given an "A" by the Texas Education Agency.

== Athletics ==
The Nazareth Swifts compete in these sports

- Baseball
- Basketball
- Cross Country
- 6-Man Football
- Golf
- Tennis
- Track and Field

=== State Titles ===
- Boys Basketball
  - 1986(1A), 2002(1A/D2), 2003(1A/D2), 2006(1A/D2), 2007(1A/D2), 2010(1A/D2)
- Girls Basketball
  - 1977(B), 1978(B), 1979(B), 1980(B), 1981(1A), 1982(1A), 1984(1A), 1985(1A), 1988(1A), 1989(1A), 1990(1A), 1991(1A), 1996(1A), 2000(1A), 2001(1A/D2), 2002(1A/D2), 2005(1A/D2), 2007(1A/D2), 2014 (1A/D2), 2015 (1A), 2017 (1A), 2018 (1A), 2019 (1A), 2020 (1A), 2023 (1A), 2025 (1A/D2), 2026 (1A/D2)
- Girls Cross Country
  - 1983(3A), 1984(2A), 1985(2A), 1986(2A), 1987(2A), 2020(1A)
