= Hilburn =

Hilburn may refer to:

== Places ==
United States

- Hilburn, Texas, an unincorporated community
- Hilburn, Wisconsin, an unincorporated community

== People with the surname ==
- Paula Blackton nee Hilburn (1881–1930), American actress
- Robert Hilburn (born 1939), American music critic and author
- Wiley W. Hilburn (1938–2014), American journalist
