= Big Square, Texas =

Coordinates: 34°23′05″N 102°28′11″W

Big Square is an unincorporated place located on Farm Road 145 in Southwestern Castro County, Texas, United States.

== Etymology ==
Big Square got its name from the 4 square (640 acres) tracts of land and 4 identical square homes settled in the community that the Stiles family built.

== History ==
Big Square was settled in 1907 by a settler named Marcus Lionel Stiles as part of a land rush that occurred between 1890 and 1910 in the XIT Ranch. Marcus purchased 640 acres worth of adjoining land in Castro County, then moved there with his family from Iowa. Families started migrating into the community during its early years, including the Will Wyler family, who settled there in 1909.

The first community post office was opened in 1910 in Otis and Nell Burton's two-story residence, which then moved to the Big Square Store. The store continued operating until its closure in 1927. A school was built by Stiles in 1909, but later was turned into a two-room brick residence in 1920. A bigger school was built upon the Agee family land in 1930, but would go out of service in 1937. Another school was then built in 1939, but the district would then merge with the schools of Springlake and Dimmitt.

Residents kept migrating into the community during the 1930s, most of them consisting of farmers and ranchers.
