= Nazareth Independent School District =

School district in Texas

Coordinates: 34.5442°N 102.1010°W

Nazareth Independent School District is a public school district based in Nazareth, Texas (USA).

Located in east central Castro County, the district has one school, Nazareth School, that serves students in grades kindergarten through twelve.

In 2009, the school district was rated "recognized" by the Texas Education Agency.

The school mascot is the swift, short for swift fox, which is native to the area.

== Sports And UIL Academics ==
Nazareth is the state's most dominant girls' basketball program, having won the most overall state championships (27: 1977, 1978, 1979, 1980, 1981, 1982, 1984, 1985, 1988, 1989, 1990, 1991, 1996, 2000, 2001, 2002, 2005, 2007, 2014, 2015, 2017, 2018, 2019, 2020, 2023, 2025, 2026), and the most consecutive (6, from 1977 through 1982) of any school in any classification. The boys have won six titles of their own—1986, 2002, 2003, 2006, 2007, and 2010.

Nazareth won the overall Academic State Competition in 2022 & 2023

== Controversy ==
In July 2024, the ACLU of Texas sent Nazareth Independent School District a letter, alleging that the district's 2023-2024 dress and grooming code appeared to violate the Texas CROWN Act, a state law which prohibits racial discrimination based on hair texture or styles, and asking the district to revise its policies for the 2024-2025 school year.
