= 2023 Texas dairy farm explosion =

Explosion and fire killing 18,000 cows

- The explosion as pictured by Castro County Emergency Management
- Date: April 10, 2023
- Time: Before 7:30 pm (CST)
- Location: Castro County, Texas, US
- Deaths: Approx. 18,000 cattle
- Injuries: 1 person

An explosion occurred on April 10, 2023, at the South Fork Dairy Farm about ten miles (16 km) south of Dimmitt, Texas, United States. The explosion and subsequent fire killed approximately 18,000 cows and injured one person. It was one of the deadliest fires involving animals, and the deadliest fire involving cattle in at least a decade. The explosion resulted in the loss of approximately 3% of Texas’s dairy cattle population.

== Background ==
The South Fork Dairy Farm is a dairy production facility located in Castro County, Texas about ten miles (16 km) south of the county seat Dimmitt. The county is the second largest dairy-producer in the United States, with more than 147,000,000 pounds (67,000,000 kg) of dairy being produced in February 2023, according to the United States Department of Agriculture. The county houses 30,000 cattle according to the 2021 Texas Annual Dairy Review.

The facility encompassed an area more than 2,100,000 square feet (200,000 m^{2}). In 2019, the Texas Commission on Environmental Quality authorized the South Fork Dairy Farm to double the amount of cattle present at their facility, from 11,500 to 23,000. The permit also enabled the farm to increase manure production by 50%. Immediately before the explosion, the facility was home to 19,000 cattle. The vast majority of them were Holstein and Jersey cows.

== Explosion ==
Local police stated that they received eight calls of the incident just before 7:30 p.m. (CST) on April 10, 2023. Reports were of a loud boom, followed a massive plume of smoke that could be seen billowing from miles away. According to emergency services, it was stated that some employees were trapped in the milking building.

After an initial explosion, a fire broke out which spread swiftly across an area of holding pens. Thousands of cattle were packed together in tight conditions in the pens; as a result, the vast majority of them were killed.

Though callers feared that multiple employees were trapped, only one woman needed rescuing. She was flown to a hospital in Lubbock, Texas.

== Aftermath ==
The explosion and subsequent fire killed approximately 18,000 cattle, equivalent to around 20% of the cattle slaughtered in the United States on a regular day. It killed almost 3% of the dairy cattle population in Texas. The resulting fire was described by the Animal Welfare Institute (AWI) as one of the deadliest fires involving animals and the deadliest cattle-related incident since the institute began records in 2013. Prior to the Castro County explosion, deaths of cows in barn fires had totaled 7,300 over that ten-year period. The AWI has proceeded to plead to the United States federal government to implement laws aimed at reducing the number of animals that are exposed to such accidents.

According to Castro County judge Mandy Gfeller, each cow was worth around US$2,000 (equivalent to $2,113 in 2025). She stated that the financial losses, excluding the destruction of equipment and buildings, could amount to tens of millions of dollars.

== Potential cause ==
Shortly after the fire, Sal Rivera from the Castro County Sheriff's Office said that the explosion could have been caused by a machine known as the "honey badger," which he described as a "vacuum that sucks the manure and water out". Authorities believe it may have overheated, igniting internal gases such as methane. The term honey badger was later clarified as being called a honey vac. Additional speculation included the possibility that the barns might have been fitted with non-fire-resistant insulation that would have enabled the explosion to ignite a fire that would spread across the 40 acres (16 ha) facility. In addition, being large cross-ventilated barns (which is of benefit to cows) meant that hundreds of fans could exhaust smoke, resulting in a massive smoke cloud that was visible from miles around.

== Fire marshal's finding ==
Dairy Management Inc. stated that "We are deferring to the appropriate authorities to determine the cause."

Investigators from the Texas Fire Marshal's Office determined in May 2023 that the incident was accidental and that it began with an engine fire in farm equipment being used to clean the barn, specifically a 'manure vacuum truck'. After the operator was unable to drive the burning truck clear of the barn, he had tried to put out the fire in the truck using two extinguishers, to no avail.

== See also ==
- Barn fire – Fire at barn or stable with farm animals
- Mass mortality event – Rapid, catastrophic die-off of organisms
