= Ozark Trail (auto trail) =

Former highway network in the south-central U.S.

- A map showing routes adopted (red) and others promoted (white) by the Ozark Trails Association

Route information
- Existed: 1913–1925

Major junctions
- Northeast end: St. Louis, Missouri
- Southwest end: El Paso, Texas; Santa Fe, New Mexico

Location
- Country: United States
- States: Missouri, Oklahoma, Texas, New Mexico

Highway system
- Auto trails

The Ozark Trail was a network of locally maintained roads and highways organized by the Ozark Trails Association that predated the United States federal highway system. The roads ran from St. Louis, Missouri, to El Paso, Texas, and Santa Fe, New Mexico, over a series of routes. These roads were maintained by both private citizens and local communities. In one case, however, the U.S. government was directly involved; it built the Newcastle Bridge in 1923 over the South Canadian River between Newcastle, Oklahoma, and Oklahoma City, as the first federal highway project built in Oklahoma.

These roads comprised the major highway system in the region until U.S. Highway 66 was built in the 1920s. In Oklahoma, portions of the section-line roads between Anadarko and Hobart are still referred to as "The Old Ozark Trail".

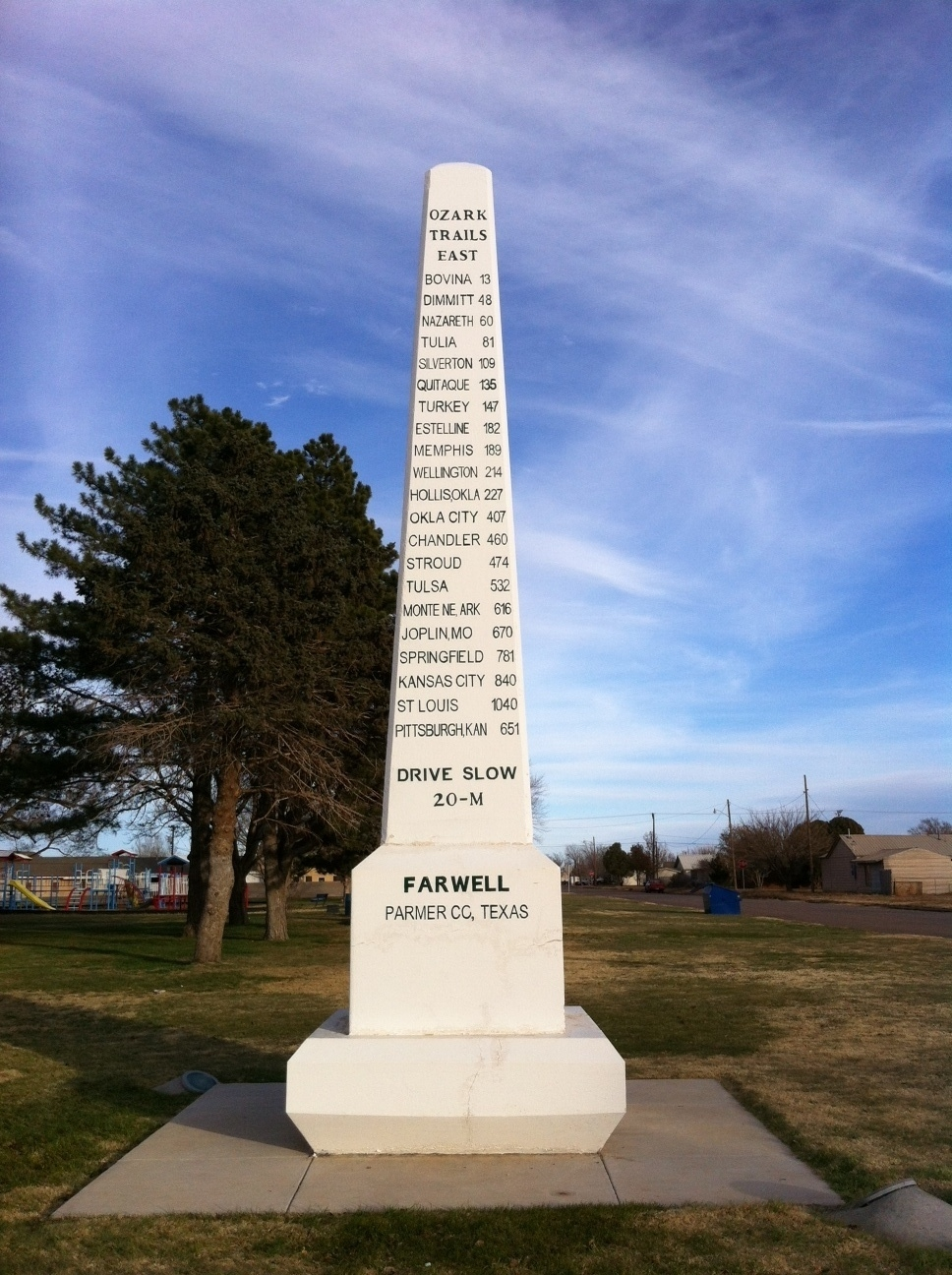
Obelisk commemorating Ozark Trail in Farwell

== Route ==
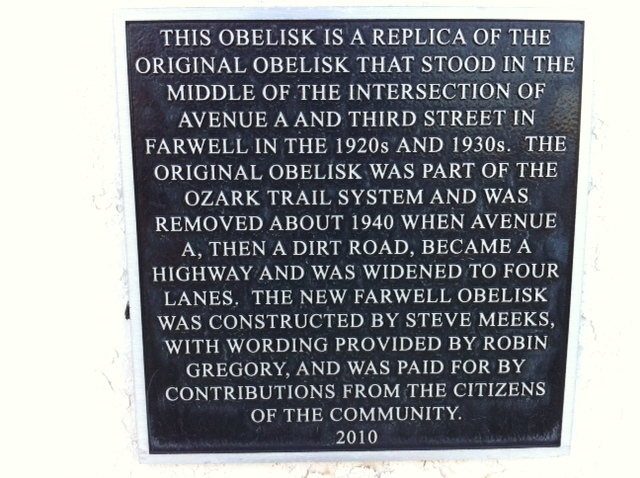
Plaque commemorating the Ozark Trail in Farwell, Texas.

The Ozark Trails Association were a group of private citizens that tried to encourage local municipalities to build and maintain road systems in the Ozarks in the early 20th century. It was established in 1913. They erected large obelisks marking the various roads and indicated distances to various towns and communities. Twenty-one were constructed and of those only 7 still remain in existence, at Stroud, Oklahoma, Farwell, Dimmitt, Wellington, and Tulia, Texas. The Ozark Trail ran through southwest Missouri and across Oklahoma, the Texas panhandle, and on into New Mexico. Much of this route became the famed U.S. Route 66. The Federal Aid Highway Act of 1925, which finally incorporated the Deep South into the Federal roads program, made the group's basic functions obsolete and it disbanded.

William Hope "Coin" Harvey was closely associated with the organization.
