= Hilburn, Texas =

- Unincorporated community
- Location within Texas Location within the United States
- Coordinates: 34°21′56″N 102°05′26″W
- Country: United States
- State: Texas
- County: Castro
- Elevation: 3,642 ft (1,110 m)
- Time zone: UTC-6 (Central (CST))
  - Summer (DST): UTC-5 (CDT)
- Area code: 806
- GNIS feature ID: 1379931

Hilburn is an unincorporated community in Castro County, Texas, United States.
