= Castro County, Texas =

County in Texas, United States

- County
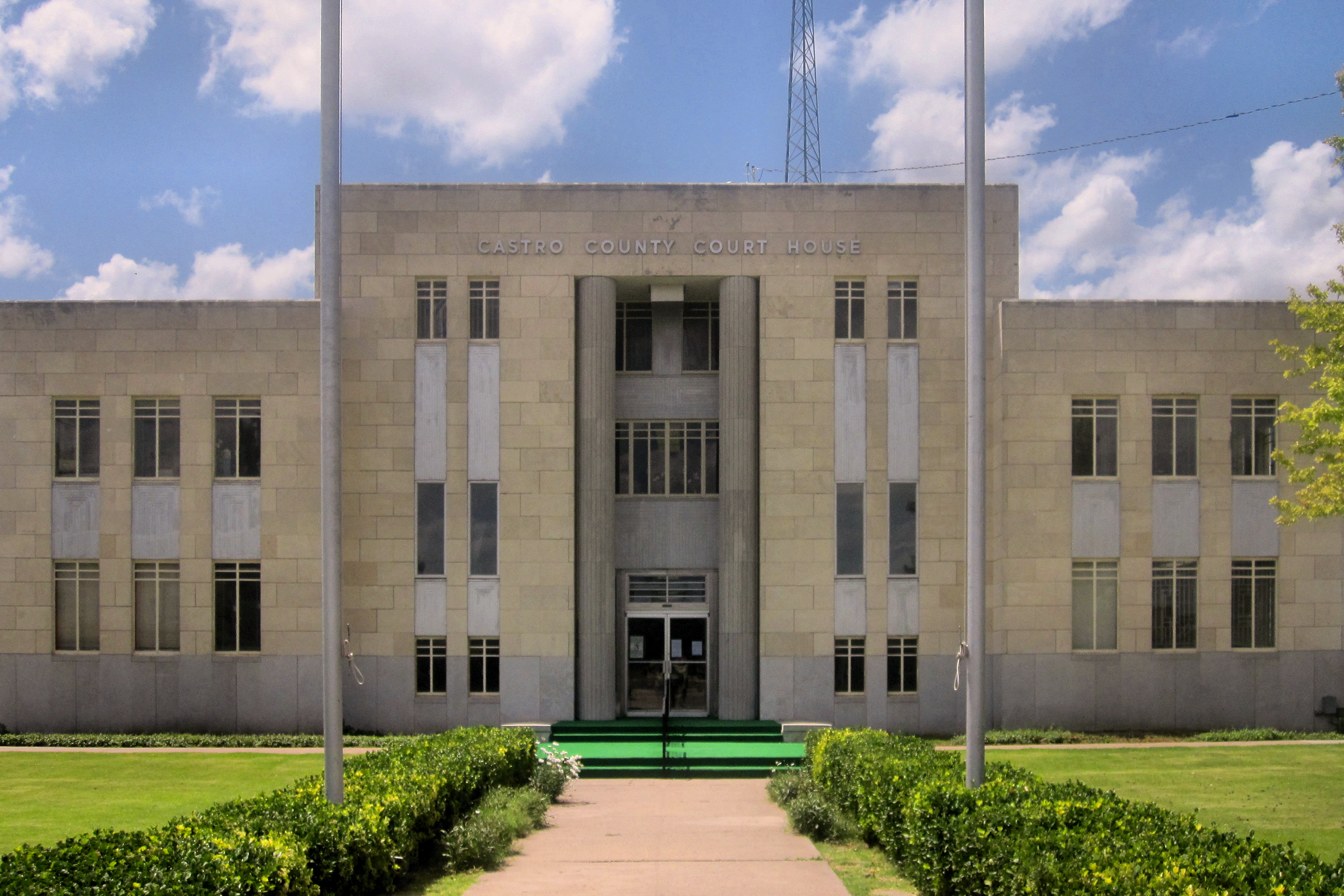
- Castro County Courthouse in Dimmitt

- Location within the U.S. state of Texas
- Coordinates: 34°32′N 102°16′W
- Country: United States
- State: Texas
- Founded: 1891
- Named for: Henri Castro
- Seat: Dimmitt
- Largest city: Dimmitt

Area
  - Total: 899 sq mi (2,330 km^{2})
  - Land: 894 sq mi (2,320 km^{2})
  - Water: 4.9 sq mi (13 km^{2}) 0.5%

Population (2020)
  - Total: 7,371
  - Estimate (2025): 7,295 ▼
  - Density: 8.24/sq mi (3.18/km^{2})
- Time zone: UTC−6 (Central)
  - Summer (DST): UTC−5 (CDT)
- Congressional district: 19th
- Website: www.co.castro.tx.us

Castro County is a county located in the U.S. state of Texas. As of the 2020 census, its population was 7,371. Its county seat is Dimmitt. The county was named for Henri Castro, who was consul general to France for the Republic of Texas and the founder of a colony in Texas.

The county was created in 1876 and was organized in 1891.

On April 10, 2023, an explosion and subsequent fire at South Fork Dairy, about 10 miles south of Dimmitt, resulted in the deaths of an estimated 18,000 dairy cattle.

== Geography ==
According to the U.S. Census Bureau, the county has a total area of 899 square miles (2,330 km^{2}), of which 4.9 square miles (13 km^{2}) (0.5%) are covered by water.

=== Major highways ===
- U.S. Highway 60
- U.S. Highway 385
- State Highway 86
- State Highway 194

=== Adjacent counties ===
- Deaf Smith County (north)
- Randall County (northeast)
- Swisher County (east)
- Hale County (southeast)
- Lamb County (south)
- Parmer County (west)

== Demographics ==
Historical population
Census	Pop.	Note	%±
1890	9		—
1900	400		4,344.4%
1910	1,850		362.5%
1920	1,948		5.3%
1930	4,720		142.3%
1940	4,631		−1.9%
1950	5,417		17.0%
1960	8,923		64.7%
1970	10,394		16.5%
1980	10,556		1.6%
1990	9,070		−14.1%
2000	8,285		−8.7%
2010	8,062		−2.7%
2020	7,371		−8.6%
2025 (est.)	7,295	▼	−1.0%
U.S. Decennial Census; 1850–2010 2010 2020

=== Racial and ethnic composition ===
Castro County, Texas – Racial and ethnic composition Note: the US Census treats Hispanic/Latino as an ethnic category. This table excludes Latinos from the racial categories and assigns them to a separate category. Hispanics/Latinos may be of any race.
Race / Ethnicity (NH = Non-Hispanic)	Pop 2000	Pop 2010	Pop 2020	% 2000	% 2010	% 2020
White alone (NH)	3,765	3,004	2,328	45.44%	37.26%	31.58%
Black or African American alone (NH)	182	149	95	2.20%	1.85%	1.29%
Native American or Alaska Native alone (NH)	31	29	39	0.37%	0.36%	0.53%
Asian alone (NH)	1	30	22	0.01%	0.37%	0.30%
Pacific Islander alone (NH)	0	0	4	0.00%	0.00%	0.05%
Other race alone (NH)	0	5	9	0.00%	0.06%	0.12%
Mixed race or Multiracial (NH)	27	17	90	0.33%	0.21%	1.22%
Hispanic or Latino (any race)	4,279	4,828	4,784	51.65%	59.89%	64.90%
Total	8,285	8,062	7,371	100.00%	100.00%	100.00%

=== 2020 census ===
As of the 2020 census, the county had a population of 7,371. The median age was 36.1 years. 28.4% of residents were under the age of 18 and 17.5% of residents were 65 years of age or older. For every 100 females there were 104.8 males, and for every 100 females age 18 and over there were 103.7 males age 18 and over.

The racial makeup of the county was 49.9% White, 1.5% Black or African American, 0.8% American Indian and Alaska Native, 0.3% Asian, 0.1% Native Hawaiian and Pacific Islander, 20.8% from some other race, and 26.7% from two or more races. Hispanic or Latino residents of any race comprised 64.9% of the population.

<0.1% of residents lived in urban areas, while 100.0% lived in rural areas.

There were 2,576 households in the county, of which 38.5% had children under the age of 18 living in them. Of all households, 53.6% were married-couple households, 19.8% were households with a male householder and no spouse or partner present, and 22.3% were households with a female householder and no spouse or partner present. About 23.5% of all households were made up of individuals and 12.0% had someone living alone who was 65 years of age or older.

There were 3,016 housing units, of which 14.6% were vacant. Among occupied housing units, 67.6% were owner-occupied and 32.4% were renter-occupied. The homeowner vacancy rate was 1.1% and the rental vacancy rate was 7.1%.

=== 2000 census ===
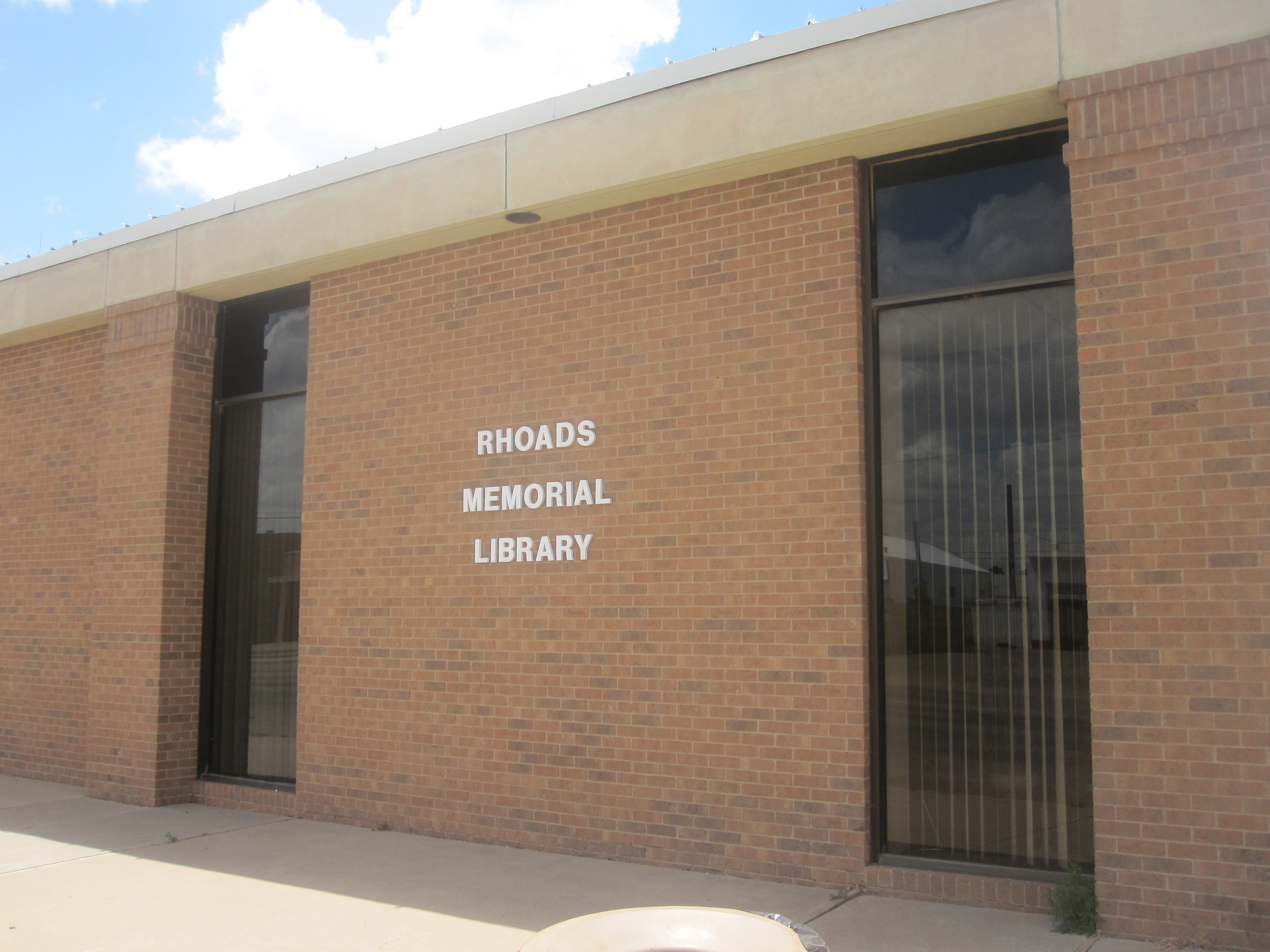
Rhoads Memorial Library serves Castro County.

As of the 2000 census, 8,285 people, 2,761 households, and 2,159 families were residing in the county. The population density was 9 people per square mile (3.5 people/km^{2}). The 3,198 housing units averaged 4 units per square mile (1.5/km^{2}). The racial makeup of the county was 75.35% White, 2.27% African American, 1.17% Native American, 19.15% from other races, and 2.05% from two or more races. About 51.65% of the population were Hispanic or Latino of any race.

Of the 2,761 households, 40.90% had children under 18 living with them, 65.10% were married couples living together, 8.70% had a female householder with no husband present, and 21.80% were not families. About 20.50% of all households were made up of individuals, and 10.20% had someone living alone who was 65 or older. The average household size was 2.98, and the average family size was 3.45.

In the county, the age distribution was 33.10% under 18, 9.00% from 18 to 24, 24.30% from 25 to 44, 20.90% from 45 to 64, and 12.70% who were 65 or older. The median age was 32 years. For every 100 females, there were 100.50 males. For every 100 females aged 18 and over, there were 98.20 males.

The median income for a household in the county was $30,619, and for a family was $35,422. Males had a median income of $25,379 versus $20,433 for females. The per capita income for the county was $14,457. About 15.70% of families and 19.00% of the population were below the poverty line, including 25.30% of those under age 18 and 13.90% of those age 65 or over.

== Politics ==
Castro County is located within District 88 of the Texas House of Representatives. Castro County is located within District 31 of the Texas Senate.

United States presidential election results for Castro County, Texas
Year	Republican		Democratic		Third party(ies)	
Year	No.	%	No.	%	No.	%
1912	18	8.65%	171	82.21%	19	9.13%
1916	69	27.38%	176	69.84%	7	2.78%
1920	118	41.84%	158	56.03%	6	2.13%
1924	68	18.43%	219	59.35%	82	22.22%
1928	319	45.38%	384	54.62%	0	0.00%
1932	66	6.45%	949	92.77%	8	0.78%
1936	65	6.34%	950	92.68%	10	0.98%
1940	224	18.27%	1,000	81.57%	2	0.16%
1944	222	18.45%	838	69.66%	143	11.89%
1948	189	13.76%	1,158	84.28%	27	1.97%
1952	1,169	58.57%	825	41.33%	2	0.10%
1956	697	34.75%	1,305	65.05%	4	0.20%
1960	810	34.01%	1,544	64.82%	28	1.18%
1964	626	25.10%	1,865	74.78%	3	0.12%
1968	1,033	36.40%	1,181	41.61%	624	21.99%
1972	1,685	68.75%	751	30.64%	15	0.61%
1976	1,007	32.74%	2,033	66.09%	36	1.17%
1980	1,955	60.75%	1,199	37.26%	64	1.99%
1984	2,026	66.30%	1,009	33.02%	21	0.69%
1988	1,604	52.61%	1,436	47.10%	9	0.30%
1992	1,307	44.91%	1,113	38.25%	490	16.84%
1996	1,231	49.22%	1,107	44.26%	163	6.52%
2000	1,607	68.27%	727	30.88%	20	0.85%
2004	1,794	73.83%	631	25.97%	5	0.21%
2008	1,562	68.18%	719	31.38%	10	0.44%
2012	1,470	69.37%	630	29.73%	19	0.90%
2016	1,414	70.81%	526	26.34%	57	2.85%
2020	1,602	76.91%	466	22.37%	15	0.72%
2024	1,594	78.79%	418	20.66%	11	0.54%

United States Senate election results for Castro County, Texas1
Year	Republican		Democratic		Third party(ies)	
Year	No.	%	No.	%	No.	%
2024	1,530	77.12%	408	20.56%	46	2.32%

United States Senate election results for Castro County, Texas2
Year	Republican		Democratic		Third party(ies)	
Year	No.	%	No.	%	No.	%
2020	1,572	77.02%	432	21.17%	37	1.81%

Texas Gubernatorial election results for Castro County
Year	Republican		Democratic		Third party(ies)	
Year	No.	%	No.	%	No.	%
2022	1,226	82.12%	239	16.01%	28	1.88%

== Communities ==
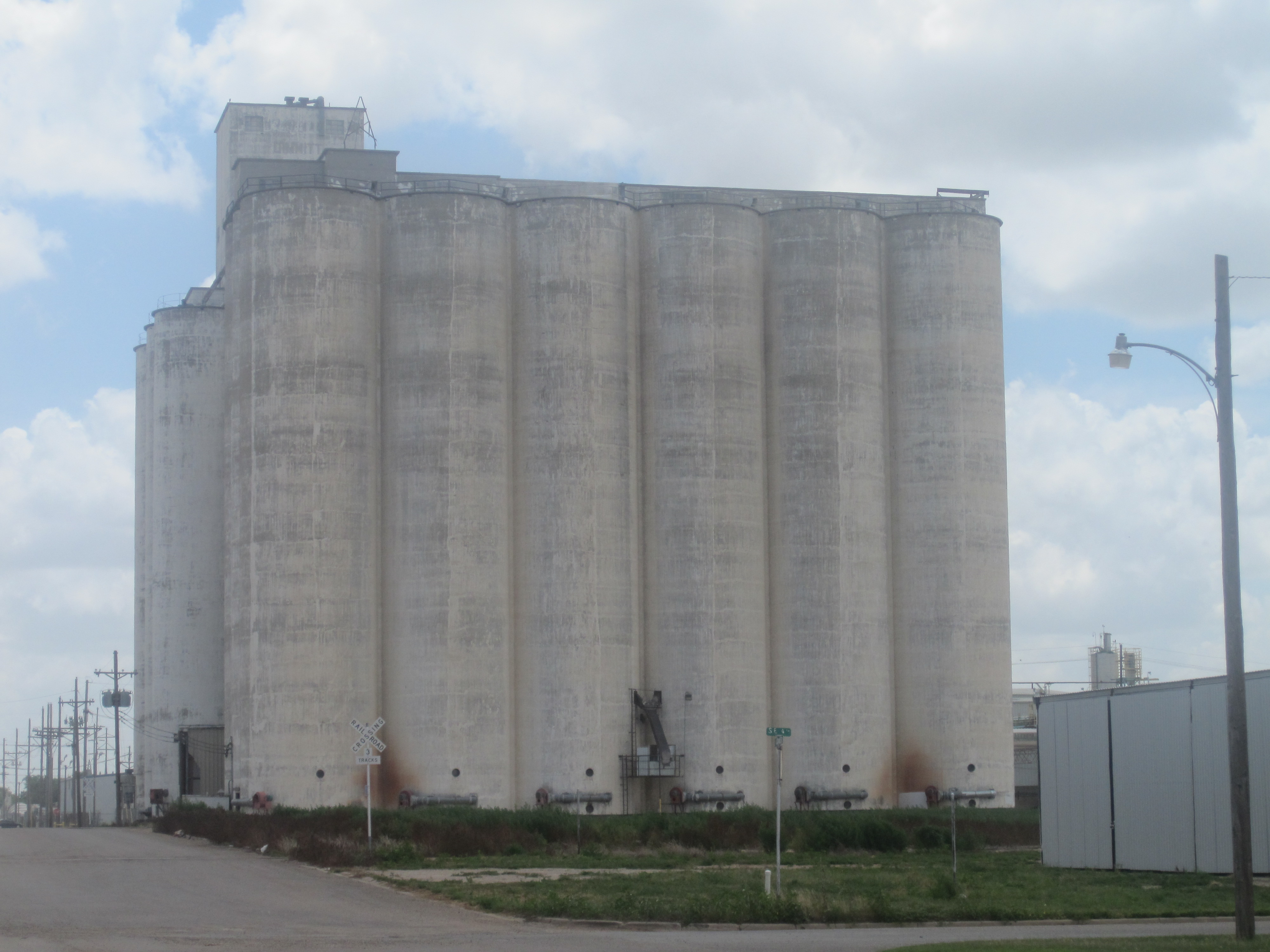
Grain elevator in Dimmitt

=== Cities ===
- Dimmitt (county seat)
- Hart
- Nazareth

=== CDP ===
- Summerfield

=== Unincorporated communities ===
- Dodd
- Easter
- Flagg
- Frio
- Hilburn
- Sunnyside

=== Ghost towns ===
- Arney
- Big Square

== Education ==
School districts:

- Dimmitt Independent School District
- Happy Independent School District
- Hart Independent School District
- Hereford Independent School District
- Lazbuddie Independent School District
- Nazareth Independent School District
- Springlake-Earth Independent School District

All of the county is in the service area of Amarillo College.

== See also ==
- List of museums in the Texas Panhandle
- Recorded Texas Historic Landmarks in Castro County
