= Hart Independent School District =

School district in Texas

Coordinates: 34.3839°N 102.1094°W

Hart Independent School District is a public school district based in Hart, Texas (USA).

The district has two campuses - Hart Junior-Senior High School (Grades 7-12) and Hart Elementary (Grades PK-6).

In 2009, the school district was rated "academically acceptable" by the Texas Education Agency.
