= Dimmitt (meteorite) =

Meteorite found in the United States

- Type: stone; H3.7 ordinary chondrite meteorite
- Structural classification: Regolith breccia
- Class: H3.7
- Group: H chrondite
- Shock stage: S3
- Country: United States
- Region: Castro County, Texas
- Coordinates: 34°35′N 102°10′W
- Observed fall: No
- Fall date: Prehistoric times
- Found date: 1942
- TKW: 200 kg
- Strewn field: Yes

Dimmitt is a meteorite that fell in prehistoric times in The United States. It was named after the nearest town of Dimmitt, Texas.

== History ==
The Dimmitt strewn field is approximately 25 miles (40 km) from the locality of Olton. Dimmitt is also currently one of 311 approved meteorites from Texas and one of 1801 approved meteorites from the United States.

There is currently a large collection of Dimmitt meteorites held in the Meteorite Collection of the University of New Mexico Institute of Meteoritics and in the Oscar Monnig Collection.
