= Easter, Texas =

- Unincorporated community
- Location within Texas Location within the United States
- Coordinates: 34°38′44″N 102°23′49″W
- Country: United States
- State: Texas
- County: Castro
- Elevation: 3,878 ft (1,182 m)
- Time zone: UTC-6 (Central (CST))
  - Summer (DST): UTC-5 (CDT)
- Area code: 806
- GNIS feature ID: 1379694

Easter is an unincorporated community in Castro County, Texas, United States. According to the Handbook of Texas, the community had an estimated population of 30 in 2000.

== Geography ==
Easter is located on Farm to Market Road 2397, 2 mi (3.2 km) east of Farm to Market Road 1055 in northwestern Castro County.
