= Junior Coffey =

American football player (1942–2021)

No. 41, 34
- Position: Running back

Personal information
- Born: March 21, 1942; Kyle, Texas, U.S.
- Died: August 30, 2021 (aged 79); Auburn, Washington, U.S.
- Listed height: 6 ft 2 in (1.88 m)
- Listed weight: 215 lb (98 kg)

Career information
- High school: Dimmitt (TX)
- College: Washington
- NFL draft: 1965: 7th round, 94th overall pick
- AFL draft: 1965: 16th round, 122nd overall pick

Career history
- Green Bay Packers (1965); Atlanta Falcons (1966–1969); New York Giants (1969-1971)

Awards and highlights
- NFL champion (1965); 2× First-team All-PCC (1962, 1963)

Career NFL statistics
- Rushing yards: 2,037
- Rushing average: 3.8
- Receptions: 64
- Receiving yards: 487
- Total touchdowns: 15
- Stats at Pro Football Reference

Junior Lee Coffey (March 21, 1942 – August 30, 2021) was an American professional football player who was a running back in the National Football League (NFL) with the Green Bay Packers, Atlanta Falcons, and New York Giants.

== Early life ==
Born in Kyle, Texas, Coffey (6 ft 1 in (1.85 m) 200 lb (91 kg)) with 10.2* speed in the 100 (yards), was one of the leading running backs and defensive linebackers in Texas high school football during the 1960s. As a senior in 1960, he rushed for 1,562 yards in 11 games to lead the Dimmitt Bobcat offense.

In a bi-district playoff game against Olton during the 1960 season, Coffey carried the ball 34 times for 253 yards and scored both Dimmitt touchdowns despite leg cramps as the Bobcats fell 15-12 to Olton.

Coffey became an all-state performer for the Bobcats in football and basketball in the 1960-61 school year. He was previously incorrectly referred to as the first black athlete ever to play in a Texas UIL state basketball tournament in 1959-60. However, Bubba Ephriam, was the first. Ephriam played for Pecos High School starting in 1955 and played as the first black athlete in a Texas UIl Star tournament in 1957-58.

As a junior during the 1959 football season, he led the Dimmitt Bobcat offense with 1294 rushing yards on 165 carries and also led the defense with 185 tackles at linebacker.

== College career ==
The Southwest Conference did not integrate until 1967, so Coffey had to leave the state to play major college football. He attended the University of Washington in Seattle and played under head coach Jim Owens. With the Huskies, Coffey was a three-time all-conference selection and was tabbed Honorable Mention All-American all three seasons. He finished his career as the second-leading ground gainer in school history.

== Professional career ==
Coffey was selected by the Green Bay Packers in the seventh round of the 1965 NFL draft. He played on the Packers' championship team of 1965. After that season, he was selected in the expansion draft for the Atlanta Falcons in 1966, and played in Atlanta for 2 1/2 seasons, where he averaged 4.0 yards per carry. He missed the entire 1968 season with a knee injury and was traded to the New York Giants midway through the 1969 season, and finished his career there in 1971, compiling career totals of 2,037 rushing yards on 500 carries, 487 receiving yards on 64 receptions and 15 touchdowns.

== After football ==
After the NFL, Coffey eventually became a Thoroughbred racehorse trainer. His colt Raise the Bluff was the favorite going into the 2007 Longacres Mile Handicap at Emerald Downs in Auburn, Washington, but placed second.

Coffey died in Auburn, Washington on August 30, 2021, at the age of 79.
