= Nazareth, Texas =

- City
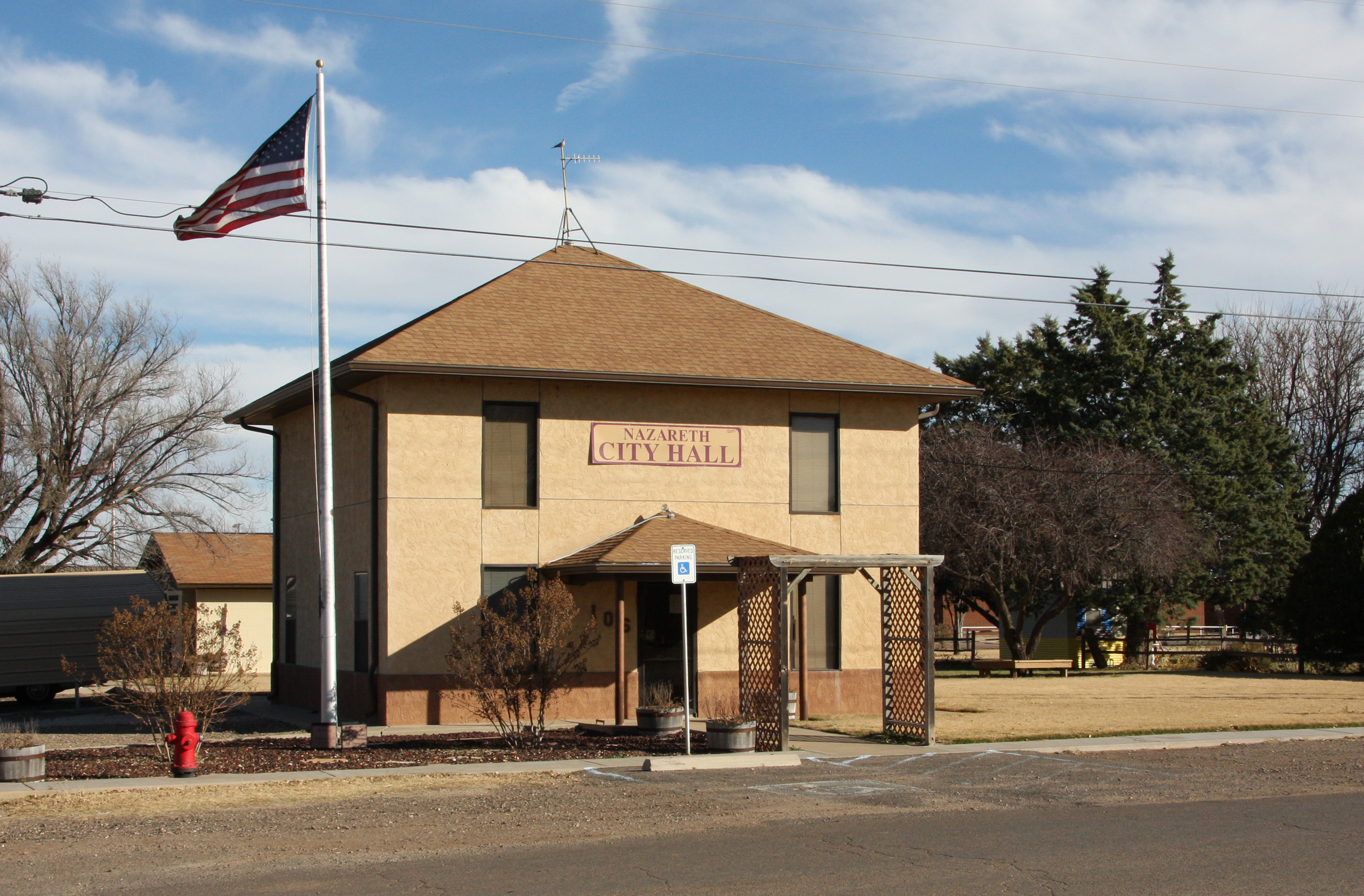
- Nazareth City Hall

- Location within Texas
- Coordinates: 34°32′39″N 102°06′10″W
- Country: United States
- State: Texas
- County: Castro
- Region: Llano Estacado
- Established: 1902
- Founder: Joseph Reisdorff

Area
  - Total: 0.36 sq mi (0.94 km^{2})
  - Land: 0.36 sq mi (0.94 km^{2})
  - Water: 0 sq mi (0.00 km^{2})
- Elevation: 3,760 ft (1,150 m)

Population (2020)
  - Total: 310
  - Density: 850/sq mi (330/km^{2})
- Time zone: UTC-6 (CST)
- ZIP code: 79063
- Area code: 806
- FIPS code: 48-50496

Nazareth is a city in Castro County, Texas, United States. The population was 310 at the 2020 census, slightly down from 311 at the 2010 census.

== Geography ==
Nazareth is located in eastern Castro County on the high plains of the Llano Estacado at 34°32′39″N 102°06′10″W. It is 12 miles (19 km) east of Dimmitt, the county seat, and 20 miles (32 km) west of Tulia.

According to the United States Census Bureau, Nazareth has a total area of 0.36 square miles (0.94 km^{2}), all land.

== History ==
The town of Nazareth was established through the efforts of a Catholic priest, Joseph Reisdorff, who moved to the site in 1902 with four farmers interested in purchasing land in the area. Father Reisdorff named his colony after the biblical Nazareth and advertised for settlers in several midwestern German Catholic newspapers. By September 1902 the first settlers had begun to arrive. A post office was established in 1903, and later that year the Catholic community finished building its first church. Nazareth had 71 residents by January 1904, and the town was platted latter that year. By 1905, in addition to the church, the settlement included a blacksmith shop, a store, and a school; when the community's cemetery was consecrated in 1906, it became the only Catholic cemetery in the area. For many years local church officials supplied what little government the community desired.

In 1914 Nazareth had an estimated 50 residents, and about 150 people were living there by 1927. During the Dust Bowl of the 1930s the area was swept by huge dust storms that uprooted crops and made farming unprofitable; in 1933, the town was estimated to have only 50 residents. Agriculture in Castro County revived during the 1940s, however, and by 1941 about 200 people were living there. The population fluctuated during the 1950s and 1960, dropping to about 75 in 1955, then rising to an estimated 275 by 1964; the census found 274 people living in the town in 1970 and 299 in 1980. As late as the mid-1980s about 85 percent of the town's residents were Catholics, and church activities helped to bond the community together. In 1990 the population stood at 293.

== Demographics ==
Historical population
Census	Pop.	Note	%±
1980	299		—
1990	293		−2.0%
2000	356		21.5%
2010	311		−12.6%
2020	310		−0.3%
U.S. Decennial Census; 2020 Census

=== 2020 census ===
As of the 2020 census, Nazareth had a population of 310. The median age was 41.8 years, 25.2% of residents were under the age of 18, and 26.5% were 65 years of age or older. For every 100 females there were 101.3 males, and for every 100 females age 18 and over there were 105.3 males age 18 and over.

0.0% of residents lived in urban areas, while 100.0% lived in rural areas.

There were 119 households in Nazareth, of which 26.9% had children under the age of 18 living in them. Of all households, 63.0% were married-couple households, 17.6% were households with a male householder and no spouse or partner present, and 19.3% were households with a female householder and no spouse or partner present. About 32.7% of all households were made up of individuals and 22.7% had someone living alone who was 65 years of age or older.

There were 134 housing units, of which 11.2% were vacant. The homeowner vacancy rate was 0.9% and the rental vacancy rate was 15.0%.

Racial composition as of the 2020 census
Race	Number	Percent
White	292	94.2%
Black or African American	0	0.0%
American Indian and Alaska Native	1	0.3%
Asian	0	0.0%
Native Hawaiian and Other Pacific Islander	0	0.0%
Some other race	6	1.9%
Two or more races	11	3.5%
Hispanic or Latino (of any race)	16	5.2%

=== 2000 census ===
As of the census of 2000, there were 356 people, 125 households, and 93 families residing in the city. The population density was 1,022.1 inhabitants per square mile (394.6/km^{2}). There were 140 housing units at an average density of 402.0 per square mile (155.2/km^{2}). The racial makeup of the city was 96.91% White, 1.12% from other races, and 1.97% from two or more races. Hispanic or Latino of any race were 5.90% of the population.

There were 125 households, out of which 46.4% had children under the age of 18 living with them, 68.8% were married couples living together, 2.4% had a female householder with no husband present, and 24.8% were non-families. 24.0% of all households were made up of individuals, and 8.0% had someone living alone who was 65 years of age or older. The average household size was 2.85 and the average family size was 3.43.

In the city, the population was spread out, with 34.3% under the age of 18, 5.1% from 18 to 24, 32.3% from 25 to 44, 16.3% from 45 to 64, and 12.1% who were 65 years of age or older. The median age was 32 years. For every 100 females, there were 114.5 males. For every 100 females age 18 and over, there were 112.7 males.

The median income for a household in the city was $36,875, and the median income for a family was $46,375. Males had a median income of $28,438 versus $21,000 for females. The per capita income for the city was $15,756. About 2.9% of families and 4.6% of the population were below the poverty line, including 4.2% of those under age 18 and 7.8% of those age 65 or over.

== Education ==
The city of Nazareth is served by the Nazareth Independent School District.

The Nazareth Swiftettes basketball team have won 27 state championships in a 50-year span (1977–2026), a current public school national record. A 2007 article on ESPN.com documented the town and the women's basketball team.

The Nazareth Swifts have also had success in basketball. They have, by a significant margin, more Regional Titles (18) and State Titles (6) than any other Texas 1A team since 1983.

== Climate ==
According to the Köppen Climate Classification system, Nazareth has a semi-arid climate, abbreviated "BSk" on climate maps.

== See also ==
- Buffalo Lake National Wildlife Refuge
- Canadian River
- Oklahoma Panhandle
- Rita Blanca National Grassland
- Texas Panhandle
- Texas State Highway 86
- Tierra Blanca Creek
- West Texas
