= Hart, Texas =

City in Castro County, Texas, United States

- City
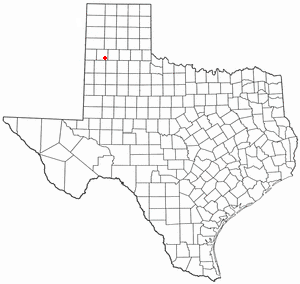
- Location of Hart, Texas

- Coordinates: 34°23′12″N 102°6′54″W
- Country: United States
- State: Texas
- County: Castro

Government
  - Mayor: Eliazar Castillo

Area
  - Total: 0.74 sq mi (1.92 km^{2})
  - Land: 0.74 sq mi (1.91 km^{2})
  - Water: 0.0039 sq mi (0.01 km^{2})
- Elevation: 3,671 ft (1,119 m)

Population (2020)
  - Total: 869
  - Density: 1,178.4/sq mi (454.97/km^{2})
- Time zone: UTC-6 (Central (CST))
  - Summer (DST): UTC-5 (CDT)
- ZIP code: 79043
- Area code: 806
- FIPS code: 48-32576
- GNIS feature ID: 1358866

Hart is a city in Castro County, Texas, United States. The population was 869 at the 2020 census.

== History ==
Hart, Texas is named after T. W. Hart, who established his ranch headquarters in the area.

Hart became an organized town in 1925 after the Fort Worth and Denver South Plains Railway announced plans to establish a depot at the site. By 1926, the railway was completed, and a depot, was built. This led to the incorporation of Hart. In 1928, the business district was moved closer to the depot, and a six-room school was constructed.

== Geography ==
Hart is located in southeastern Castro County at 34°23′12″N 102°6′54″W (34.386723, –102.115035), along Texas State Highway 194. Dimmitt, the county seat, is 16 miles (26 km) to the northwest, and Plainview is 28 miles (45 km) to the southeast.

According to the United States Census Bureau, Hart has a total area of 0.73 square miles (1.9 km^{2}), all land.

== Demographics ==
Historical population
Census	Pop.	Note	%±
1960	577		—
1970	905		56.8%
1980	1,008		11.4%
1990	1,221		21.1%
2000	1,198		−1.9%
2010	1,114		−7.0%
2020	869		−22.0%
U.S. Decennial Census

=== 2020 census ===
As of the 2020 census, Hart had a population of 869 people, 309 households, and 249 families residing in the city.

The median age was 37.3 years. 24.4% of residents were under the age of 18 and 17.1% of residents were 65 years of age or older. For every 100 females there were 104.5 males, and for every 100 females age 18 and over there were 106.6 males age 18 and over.

0.0% of residents lived in urban areas, while 100.0% lived in rural areas.

There were 309 households in Hart, of which 35.3% had children under the age of 18 living in them. Of all households, 52.8% were married-couple households, 21.0% were households with a male householder and no spouse or partner present, and 24.6% were households with a female householder and no spouse or partner present. About 21.7% of all households were made up of individuals and 10.0% had someone living alone who was 65 years of age or older.

There were 376 housing units, of which 17.8% were vacant. The homeowner vacancy rate was 0.0% and the rental vacancy rate was 13.6%.

Racial composition as of the 2020 census
Race	Number	Percent
White	262	30.1%
Black or African American	6	0.7%
American Indian and Alaska Native	1	0.1%
Asian	0	0.0%
Native Hawaiian and Other Pacific Islander	0	0.0%
Some other race	201	23.1%
Two or more races	399	45.9%
Hispanic or Latino (of any race)	741	85.3%

=== 2000 census ===
As of the census of 2000, there were 1,198 people, 371 households, and 304 families residing in the city. The population density was 1,594.5 inhabitants per square mile (615.6/km^{2}). There were 410 housing units at an average density of 545.7 per square mile (210.7/km^{2}). The racial makeup of the city was 60.93% White, 3.09% African American, 0.92% Native American, 0.08% Pacific Islander, 32.05% from other races, and 2.92% from two or more races. Hispanic or Latino of any race were 74.62% of the population.

There were 371 households, out of which 48.8% had children under the age of 18 living with them, 68.2% were married couples living together, 8.4% had a female householder with no husband present, and 17.8% were non-families. 15.9% of all households were made up of individuals, and 8.4% had someone living alone who was 65 years of age or older. The average household size was 3.23 and the average family size was 3.61.

In the city, the population was spread out, with 35.9% under the age of 18, 10.0% from 18 to 24, 25.0% from 25 to 44, 18.9% from 45 to 64, and 10.2% who were 65 years of age or older. The median age was 28 years. For every 100 females, there were 104.1 males. For every 100 females age 18 and over, there were 99.0 males.

The median income for a household in the city was $28,424, and the median income for a family was $28,681. Males had a median income of $23,594 versus $15,625 for females. The per capita income for the city was $9,960. About 14.7% of families and 17.1% of the population were below the poverty line, including 20.5% of those under age 18 and 21.1% of those age 65 or over.

== Climate ==
According to the Köppen Climate Classification system, Hart has a semi-arid climate, abbreviated "BSk" on climate maps.

Climate data for Hart, Texas (1991–2020 normals, extremes 1986–present)
Month	Jan	Feb	Mar	Apr	May	Jun	Jul	Aug	Sep	Oct	Nov	Dec	Year
Record high °F (°C)	81 (27)	86 (30)	96 (36)	102 (39)	108 (42)	110 (43)	106 (41)	105 (41)	107 (42)	98 (37)	91 (33)	80 (27)	110 (43)
Mean maximum °F (°C)	72.6 (22.6)	77.1 (25.1)	84.3 (29.1)	89.7 (32.1)	96.2 (35.7)	100.5 (38.1)	98.9 (37.2)	97.4 (36.3)	95.1 (35.1)	90.1 (32.3)	80.5 (26.9)	72.6 (22.6)	102.5 (39.2)
Mean daily maximum °F (°C)	50.8 (10.4)	55.3 (12.9)	63.4 (17.4)	71.6 (22.0)	79.6 (26.4)	87.5 (30.8)	89.2 (31.8)	87.8 (31.0)	81.4 (27.4)	72.2 (22.3)	60.3 (15.7)	51.1 (10.6)	70.8 (21.6)
Daily mean °F (°C)	35.7 (2.1)	39.3 (4.1)	47.1 (8.4)	54.9 (12.7)	64.5 (18.1)	73.2 (22.9)	75.7 (24.3)	74.3 (23.5)	67.5 (19.7)	56.8 (13.8)	44.9 (7.2)	36.6 (2.6)	55.9 (13.3)
Mean daily minimum °F (°C)	20.5 (−6.4)	23.3 (−4.8)	30.8 (−0.7)	38.3 (3.5)	49.3 (9.6)	59.0 (15.0)	62.2 (16.8)	60.8 (16.0)	53.6 (12.0)	41.4 (5.2)	29.5 (−1.4)	22.1 (−5.5)	40.9 (4.9)
Mean minimum °F (°C)	8.4 (−13.1)	10.9 (−11.7)	17.1 (−8.3)	26.3 (−3.2)	37.2 (2.9)	51.2 (10.7)	58.1 (14.5)	55.6 (13.1)	42.8 (6.0)	27.6 (−2.4)	15.3 (−9.3)	8.8 (−12.9)	3.7 (−15.7)
Record low °F (°C)	−9 (−23)	−11 (−24)	3 (−16)	20 (−7)	24 (−4)	44 (7)	52 (11)	48 (9)	33 (1)	14 (−10)	−2 (−19)	−11 (−24)	−11 (−24)
Average precipitation inches (mm)	0.49 (12)	0.49 (12)	0.99 (25)	1.18 (30)	2.46 (62)	2.56 (65)	2.13 (54)	2.35 (60)	1.91 (49)	1.64 (42)	0.82 (21)	0.72 (18)	17.74 (451)
Average snowfall inches (cm)	1.2 (3.0)	1.8 (4.6)	0.6 (1.5)	0.0 (0.0)	0.0 (0.0)	0.0 (0.0)	0.0 (0.0)	0.0 (0.0)	0.0 (0.0)	0.1 (0.25)	0.7 (1.8)	1.8 (4.6)	6.2 (16)
Average precipitation days (≥ 0.01 in)	2.9	3.4	4.5	4.4	6.4	7.2	5.9	7.0	5.8	4.7	3.3	3.0	58.5
Average snowy days (≥ 0.1 in)	0.7	1.0	0.4	0.1	0.0	0.0	0.0	0.0	0.0	0.1	0.5	1.0	3.8
Source: NOAA

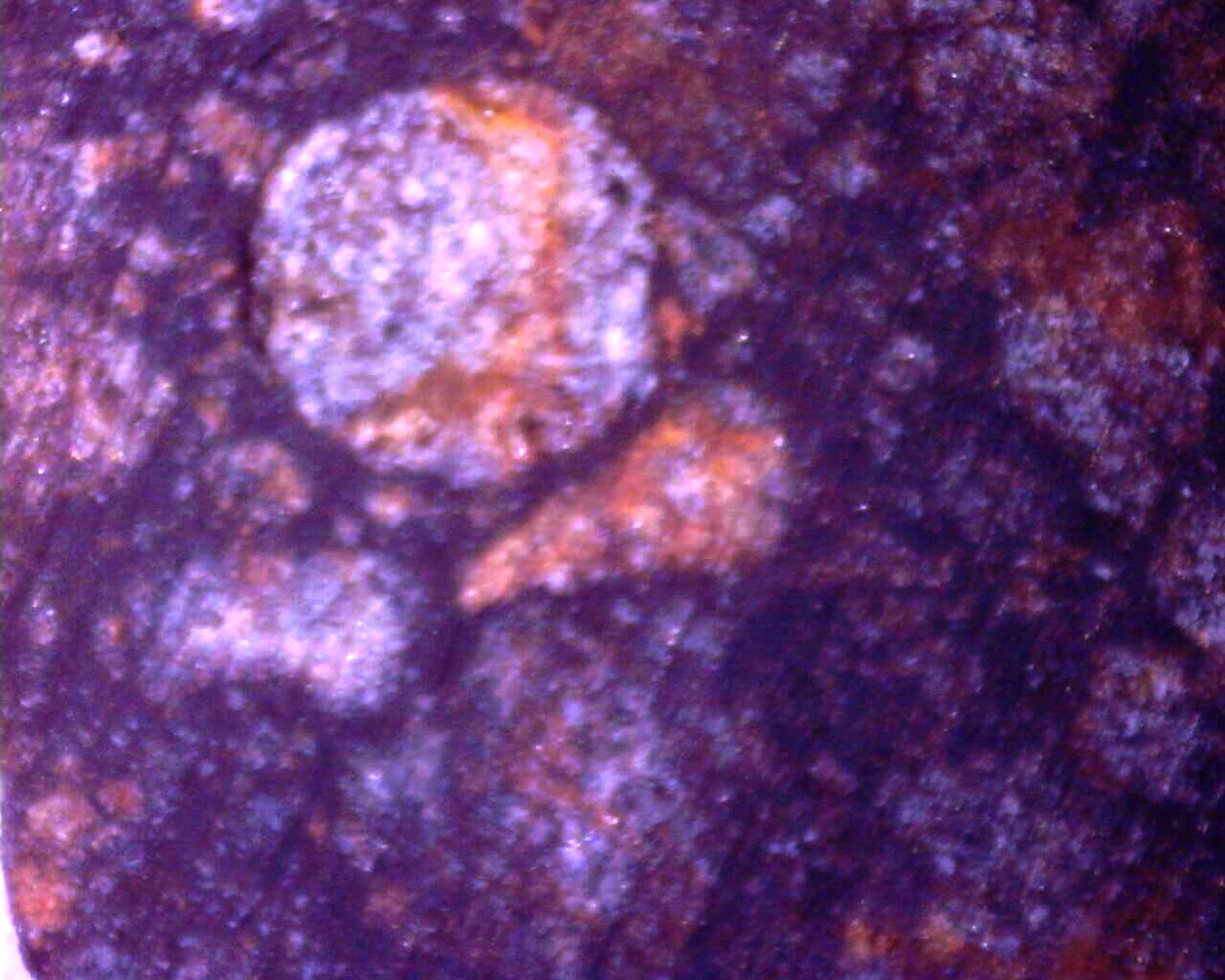
Magnification of a chondrule in the Hart (Texas) meteorite. Field of View - 5mm. Courtesy of Keith D. Lemons Meteoritical Collection

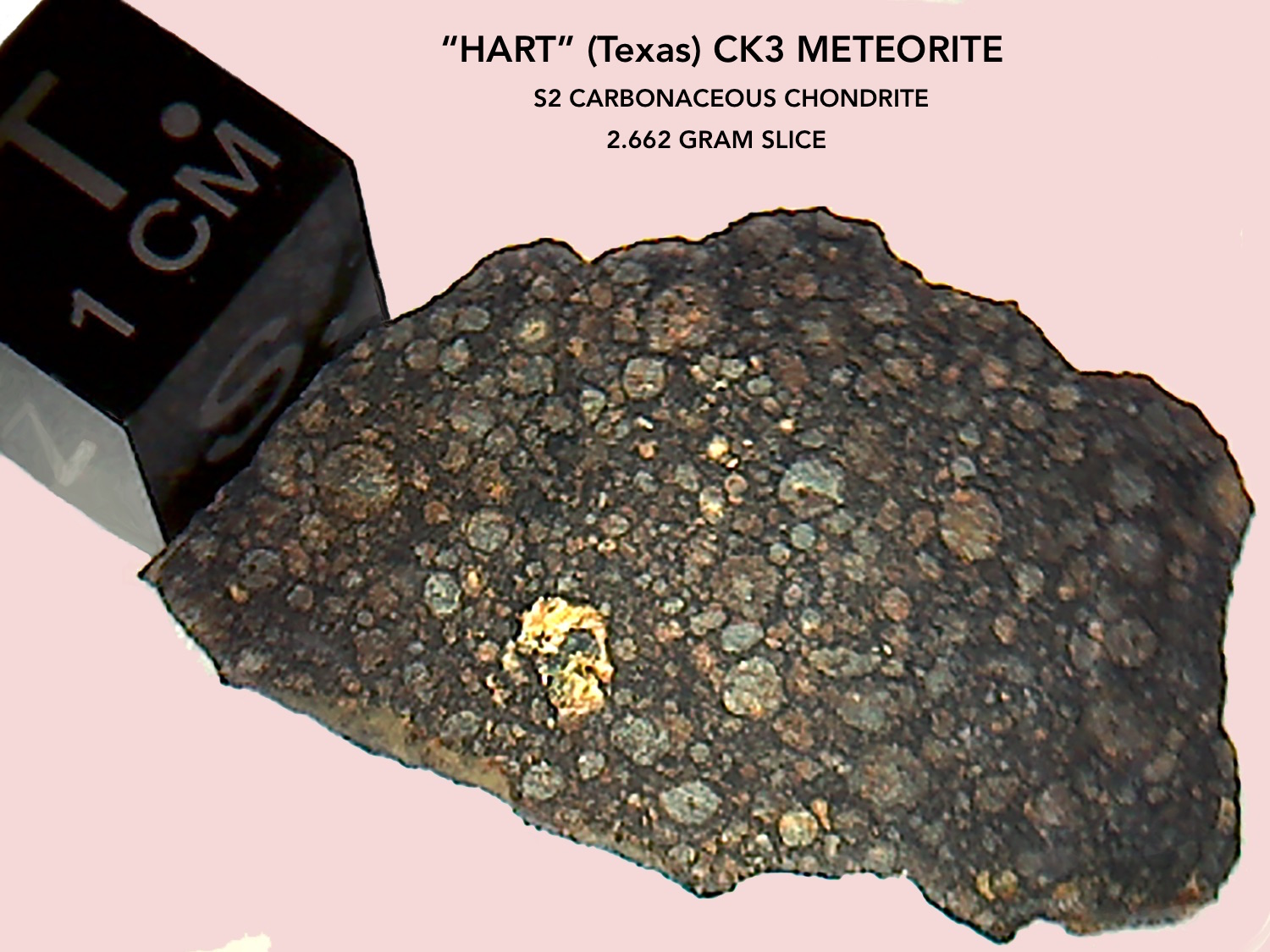
2.662 Gram Slice of "Hart" (Texas) Meteorite, a CK3, S2 Carbonaceous Chondrite.

== Education ==
The city of Hart is served by the Hart Independent School District.

== Planetary Science ==
A rare type of meteorite unique to the Western Hemisphere was discovered near Hart in March 2010. A field worker found a single, large, dense brownish stone weighing 966 grams beside a road located 0.25 miles from the town of Hart. The meteor was subsequently purchased by a collector. The stone was analyzed at the University of Washington and was classified as a Carbonaceous Chondrite (CK3), the most massive example of one of 25 known specimens in the world. The meteorite was given the official name of "Hart".

== See also ==
- List of municipalities in Texas
