= Dimmitt Independent School District =

School district in Texas

Dimmitt Independent School District is a public school district based in Dimmitt, Texas (USA).

In 2009, the school district was rated "academically acceptable" by the Texas Education Agency.

== Schools ==
- Richardson Elementary
- Dimmitt Middle School
- Dimmitt High School
