= Dimmitt, Texas =

- City
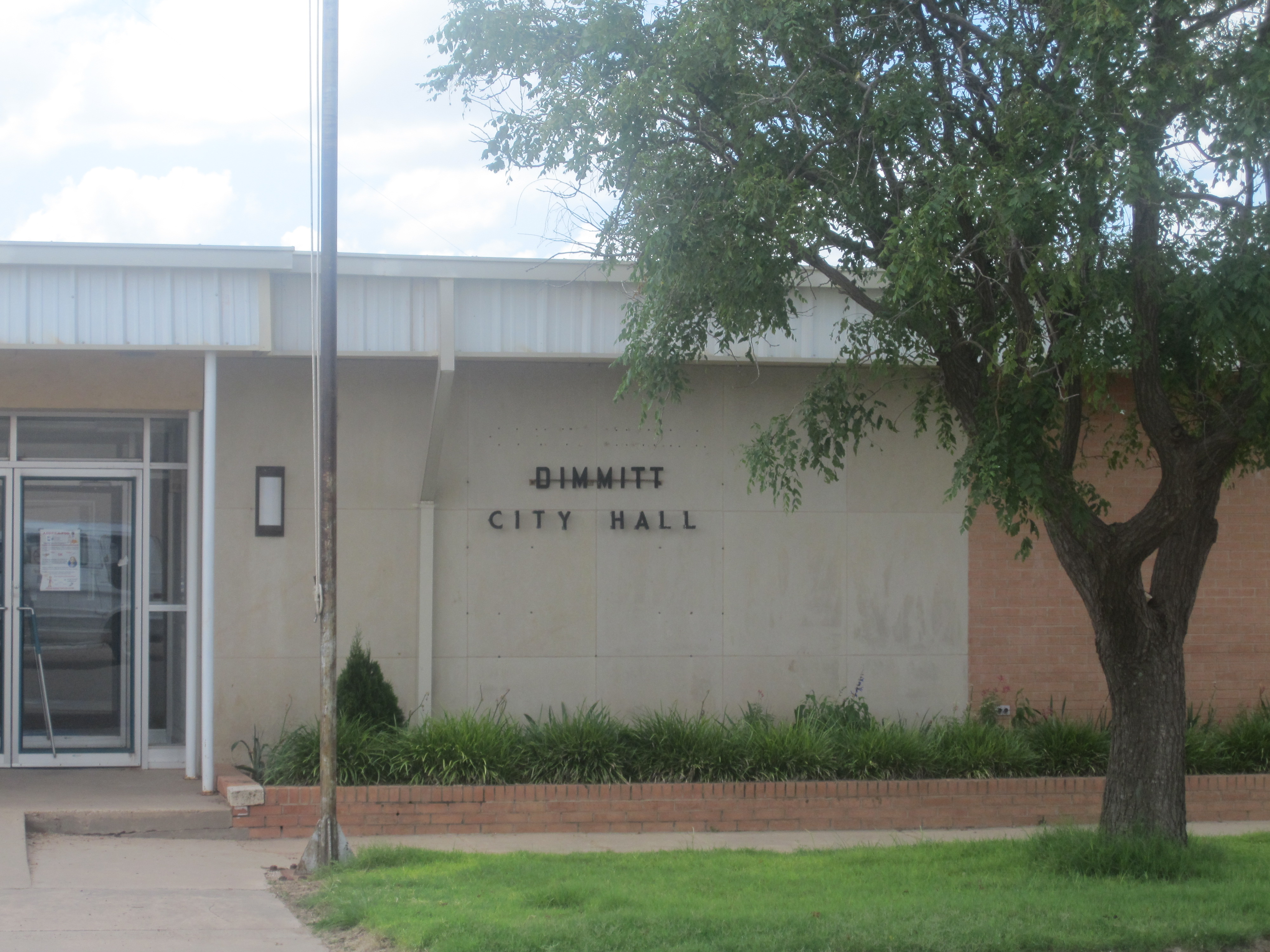
- Dimmitt City Hall (2010)

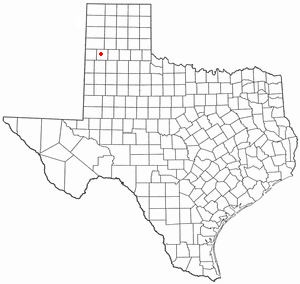
- Location within Castro County and Texas

- Coordinates: 34°32′57″N 102°18′55″W
- Country: United States
- State: Texas
- County: Castro

Area
  - Total: 3.25 sq mi (8.43 km^{2})
  - Land: 3.15 sq mi (8.16 km^{2})
  - Water: 0.10 sq mi (0.27 km^{2})
- Elevation: 3,875 ft (1,181 m)

Population (2020)
  - Total: 4,171
  - Density: 1,320/sq mi (511/km^{2})
- Time zone: UTC−6 (Central (CST))
  - Summer (DST): UTC−5 (CDT)
- ZIP Code: 79027
- Area code: 806
- FIPS code: 48-20464
- GNIS feature ID: 1356029
- Website: https://www.cityofdimmitt.org/

Dimmitt (/ˈdɪmɪt/ DIM-it) is a city in and the county seat of Castro County, Texas, United States. Its population was 4,171 at the 2020 census.

== History ==
Dimmitt is located on the old Ozark Trail, a road system from St. Louis, Missouri, to El Paso, Texas. The Ozark Trail is marked at the courthouse.

Dimmitt, Texas has a history dating back to March 1890 when the Bedford Town and Land Company purchased land and established the townsite. H. G. Bedford oversaw the sale of lots, and the town was named after his brother-in-law Rev. W.C. Dimmitt. The town faced competition for the county seat but was voted county seat on December 18, 1891.

By this time, Dimmitt had two stores, a post office, a hotel, a school, and a resident doctor. A wooden courthouse was completed in 1892, and was replaced by a brick structure after the original burned down in 1906. A brick school building was completed in 1910.

Despite a lack of a railroad in its early years, Dimmitt remained the county seat. In July 1928, the Fort Worth and Denver South Plains Railway extended to Dimmitt, leading to Dimmitt's incorporation. The 1930s saw the founding of a hospital and a county library, and a new county courthouse replaced the earlier red-brick building in 1938.

In 1942, a meteorite was discovered in Castro County and named after the town of Dimmitt. It is one of 311 approved meteorites from Texas.

On 10 April 2023, an explosion and subsequent fire at South Fork Dairy, about 10 miles (16 km) south of Dimmitt, resulted in the deaths of an estimated 18,000 dairy cattle.

== Geography ==
Dimmitt is located slightly west of the center of Castro County at 34°32′57″N 102°18′55″W (34.549052, –102.315355). According to the United States Census Bureau, the city has a total area of 3.2 square miles (8.4 km^{2}), of which 0.1 square miles (0.3 km^{2}), or 3.26%, is covered by water.

U.S. Route 385 passes through the city, leading north 20 miles (32 km) to Hereford, the seat of Deaf Smith County, and south 22 miles (35 km) to Springlake. Texas State Highway 86 crosses US 385 near the center of town and leads east 32 miles (51 km) to Tulia and west 33 miles (53 km) to Bovina.

=== Climate ===
Climate data for Dimmitt, Texas (1991–2020 normals, extremes 1962–present)
| Month | Jan | Feb | Mar | Apr | May | Jun | Jul | Aug | Sep | Oct | Nov | Dec | Year |
|---|---|---|---|---|---|---|---|---|---|---|---|---|---|
| Record high °F (°C) | 80 (27) | 86 (30) | 98 (37) | 99 (37) | 104 (40) | 109 (43) | 111 (44) | 107 (42) | 102 (39) | 97 (36) | 87 (31) | 79 (26) | 111 (44) |
| Mean maximum °F (°C) | 71.3 (21.8) | 75.9 (24.4) | 83.3 (28.5) | 88.8 (31.6) | 95.7 (35.4) | 101.0 (38.3) | 100.8 (38.2) | 99.1 (37.3) | 95.6 (35.3) | 88.9 (31.6) | 79.5 (26.4) | 71.5 (21.9) | 103.5 (39.7) |
| Mean daily maximum °F (°C) | 51.4 (10.8) | 55.8 (13.2) | 64.1 (17.8) | 72.3 (22.4) | 80.9 (27.2) | 89.7 (32.1) | 91.7 (33.2) | 90.4 (32.4) | 83.3 (28.5) | 72.8 (22.7) | 60.7 (15.9) | 51.4 (10.8) | 72.0 (22.2) |
| Daily mean °F (°C) | 36.8 (2.7) | 40.2 (4.6) | 47.8 (8.8) | 55.4 (13.0) | 65.2 (18.4) | 74.8 (23.8) | 77.6 (25.3) | 76.2 (24.6) | 68.9 (20.5) | 57.7 (14.3) | 45.7 (7.6) | 37.5 (3.1) | 57.0 (13.9) |
| Mean daily minimum °F (°C) | 22.3 (−5.4) | 24.6 (−4.1) | 31.4 (−0.3) | 38.6 (3.7) | 49.4 (9.7) | 59.9 (15.5) | 63.4 (17.4) | 62.1 (16.7) | 54.5 (12.5) | 42.5 (5.8) | 30.7 (−0.7) | 23.5 (−4.7) | 41.9 (5.5) |
| Mean minimum °F (°C) | 7.7 (−13.5) | 9.7 (−12.4) | 15.1 (−9.4) | 24.1 (−4.4) | 34.3 (1.3) | 48.4 (9.1) | 55.4 (13.0) | 53.8 (12.1) | 41.5 (5.3) | 26.2 (−3.2) | 13.8 (−10.1) | 6.9 (−13.9) | 2.2 (−16.6) |
| Record low °F (°C) | −8 (−22) | −12 (−24) | 0 (−18) | 14 (−10) | 22 (−6) | 38 (3) | 46 (8) | 40 (4) | 27 (−3) | 14 (−10) | −2 (−19) | −8 (−22) | −12 (−24) |
| Average precipitation inches (mm) | 0.57 (14) | 0.54 (14) | 1.03 (26) | 1.25 (32) | 2.64 (67) | 3.59 (91) | 2.35 (60) | 3.10 (79) | 2.41 (61) | 2.10 (53) | 0.70 (18) | 0.72 (18) | 21.00 (533) |
| Average snowfall inches (cm) | 1.9 (4.8) | 2.1 (5.3) | 1.4 (3.6) | 0.1 (0.25) | 0.0 (0.0) | 0.0 (0.0) | 0.0 (0.0) | 0.0 (0.0) | 0.0 (0.0) | 0.4 (1.0) | 1.1 (2.8) | 2.8 (7.1) | 9.8 (25) |
| Average precipitation days (≥ 0.01 in) | 2.8 | 3.4 | 4.4 | 4.9 | 6.6 | 7.4 | 6.5 | 7.9 | 6.4 | 5.5 | 3.2 | 3.8 | 62.8 |
| Average snowy days (≥ 0.1 in) | 1.3 | 1.1 | 0.6 | 0.2 | 0.0 | 0.0 | 0.0 | 0.0 | 0.0 | 0.2 | 0.7 | 1.5 | 5.6 |
Source: NOAA

== Demographics ==
Historical population
| Census | Pop. | Note | %± |
|---|---|---|---|
| 1930 | 829 | | — |
| 1940 | 943 | | 13.8% |
| 1950 | 1,461 | | 54.9% |
| 1960 | 2,935 | | 100.9% |
| 1970 | 4,327 | | 47.4% |
| 1980 | 5,019 | | 16.0% |
| 1990 | 4,408 | | −12.2% |
| 2000 | 4,375 | | −0.7% |
| 2010 | 4,393 | | 0.4% |
| 2020 | 4,171 | | −5.1% |
U.S. Decennial Census

=== 2020 census ===
As of the 2020 census, 4,171 people lived in Dimmitt in 1,406 households, including 1,016 family households.

The median age was 33.0 years, 30.6% of residents were under the age of 18, and 16.7% were 65 years of age or older; for every 100 females there were 100.3 males, and for every 100 females age 18 and over there were 97.2 males age 18 and over.

0.0% of residents lived in urban areas, while 100.0% lived in rural areas.

Of the 1,406 households in Dimmitt, 42.5% had children under the age of 18 living in them, 50.2% were married-couple households, 17.8% were households with a male householder and no spouse or partner present, 25.5% were households with a female householder and no spouse or partner present, 22.3% were made up of individuals, and 12.3% had someone living alone who was 65 years of age or older.

There were 1,602 housing units, of which 12.2% were vacant; the homeowner vacancy rate was 1.4% and the rental vacancy rate was 7.0%.

Racial composition as of the 2020 census
| Race | Number | Percent |
|---|---|---|
| White | 1,803 | 43.2% |
| Black or African American | 95 | 2.3% |
| American Indian and Alaska Native | 48 | 1.2% |
| Asian | 17 | 0.4% |
| Native Hawaiian and Other Pacific Islander | 2 | 0.0% |
| Some other race | 1,064 | 25.5% |
| Two or more races | 1,142 | 27.4% |
| Hispanic or Latino (of any race) | 3,149 | 75.5% |

=== 2010 census ===
As of the 2010 United States census, 4,393 people were living in the city. The racial makeup of the city was 68.8% Hispanic or Latino, 27.6% White, 2.3% Black, 0.3% Native American, 0.5% Asian, 0.1% from some other race, and 0.3% from two or more races.

=== 2000 census ===
As of the census of 2000, 4,375 people, 1,464 households, and 1,124 families were living in the city. The population density was 2,116 inhabitants per square mile (817/km^{2}). The 1,692 housing units had an average density of 818.5 per square mile (316.0/km^{2}). The racial makeup of the city was 75.02% White, 2.99% African American, 1.69% Native American, 18.10% from other races, and 2.19% from two or more races. Hispanics or Latinos of any race were 56.94% of the population.

Of the 1,464 households, 39.6% had children under 18 living with them, 60.7% were married couples living together, 12.0% had a female householder with no husband present, and 23.2% were not families. About 22.1% of all households were made up of individuals, and 12.4% had someone living alone who was 65 or older. The average household size was 2.94 and the average family size was 3.46.

In the city, the age distribution was 33.4% under 18, 9.1% from 18 to 24, 22.2% from 25 to 44, 21.3% from 45 to 64, and 13.9% who were 65 or older. The median age was 32 years. For every 100 females, there were 93.8 males. For every 100 females age 18 and over, there were 89.5 males.

The median income for a household in the city was $27,454, and for a family was $33,885. Males had a median income of $24,575 versus $20,162 for females. The per capita income for the city was $14,228. About 19.0% of families and 23.1% of the population were below the poverty line, including 31.1% of those under age 18 and 16.4% of those age 65 or over.

== Education ==
Dimmit has the Rhoads Memorial Library, which is a member of the Harrington Library Consortium.

Dimmitt is served by the Dimmitt Independent School District. The district has a history in sports, mainly basketball. The Bobcats and Bobbies have won several state championships.

Bobbies

- 1953–1954 1A-2A Dimmitt
- 1954–1955 1A Dimmitt
- 1992–1993 3A Dimmitt

Bobcats

- 1951–1952 1A-2A Division 2 Dimmitt
- 1974–1975 2A Dimmitt
- 1981–1982 3A Dimmitt
- 1982–1983 3A Dimmitt

== Healthcare ==
Dimmitt is served by the Castro County Healthcare System. It also serves the surrounding county and the cities of Nazareth and Hart.

== Notable people ==
- Junior Coffey, (1942–2021) former NFL football player
- Kent Hance, former U.S. Representative from the Texas South Plains, former member of the Texas Railroad Commission, and the chancellor of Texas Tech University in Lubbock from 2006 to 2014; born in Dimmitt and graduated in 1961 from Dimmitt High School
- Thomas Edward "Edd" Mayfield (1926–1958), bluegrass musician
- Lometa Odom (1933–2017) basketball player and coach, member of the Women's Basketball Hall of Fame

== Gallery ==
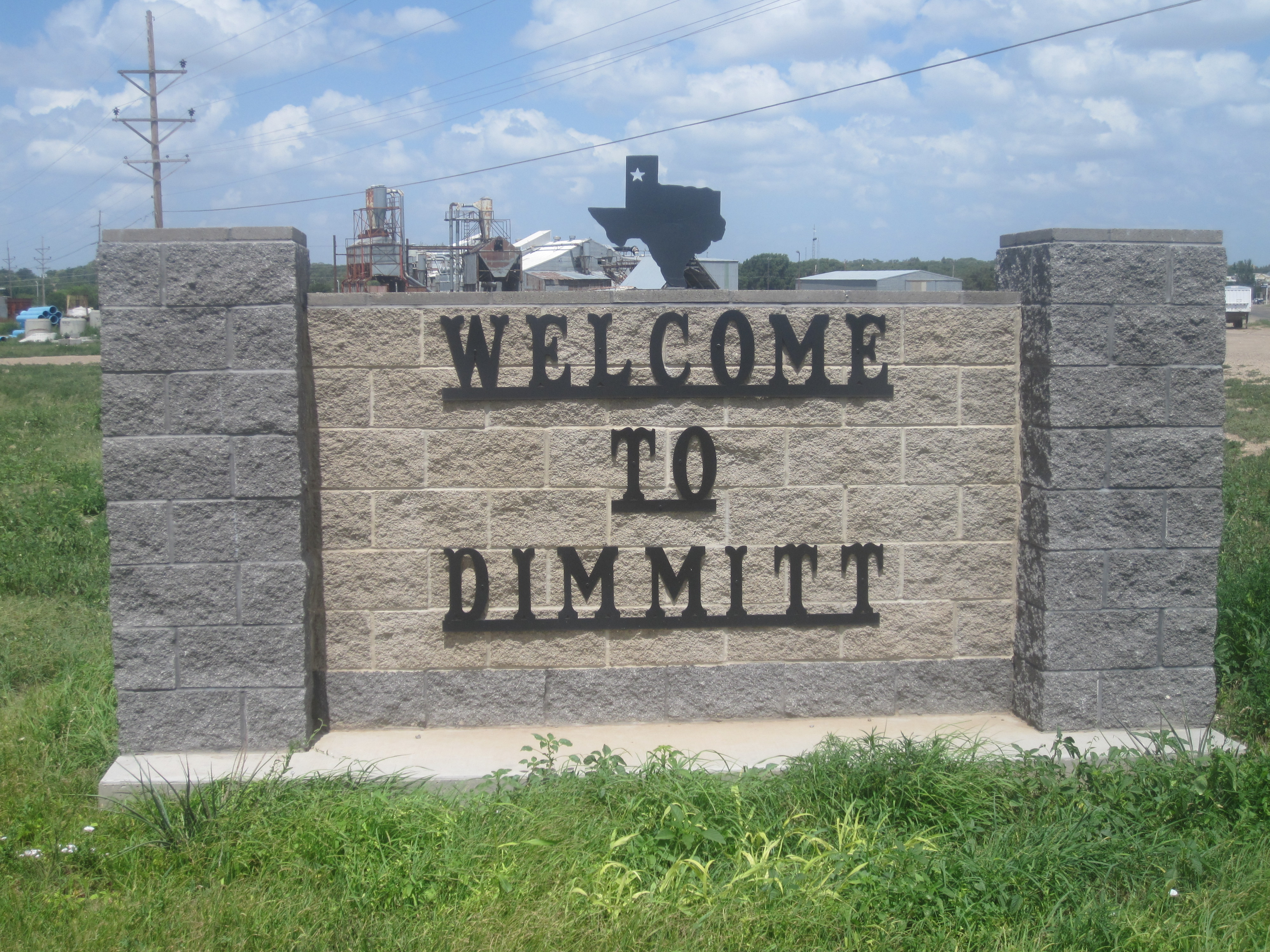
Dimmitt welcome sign

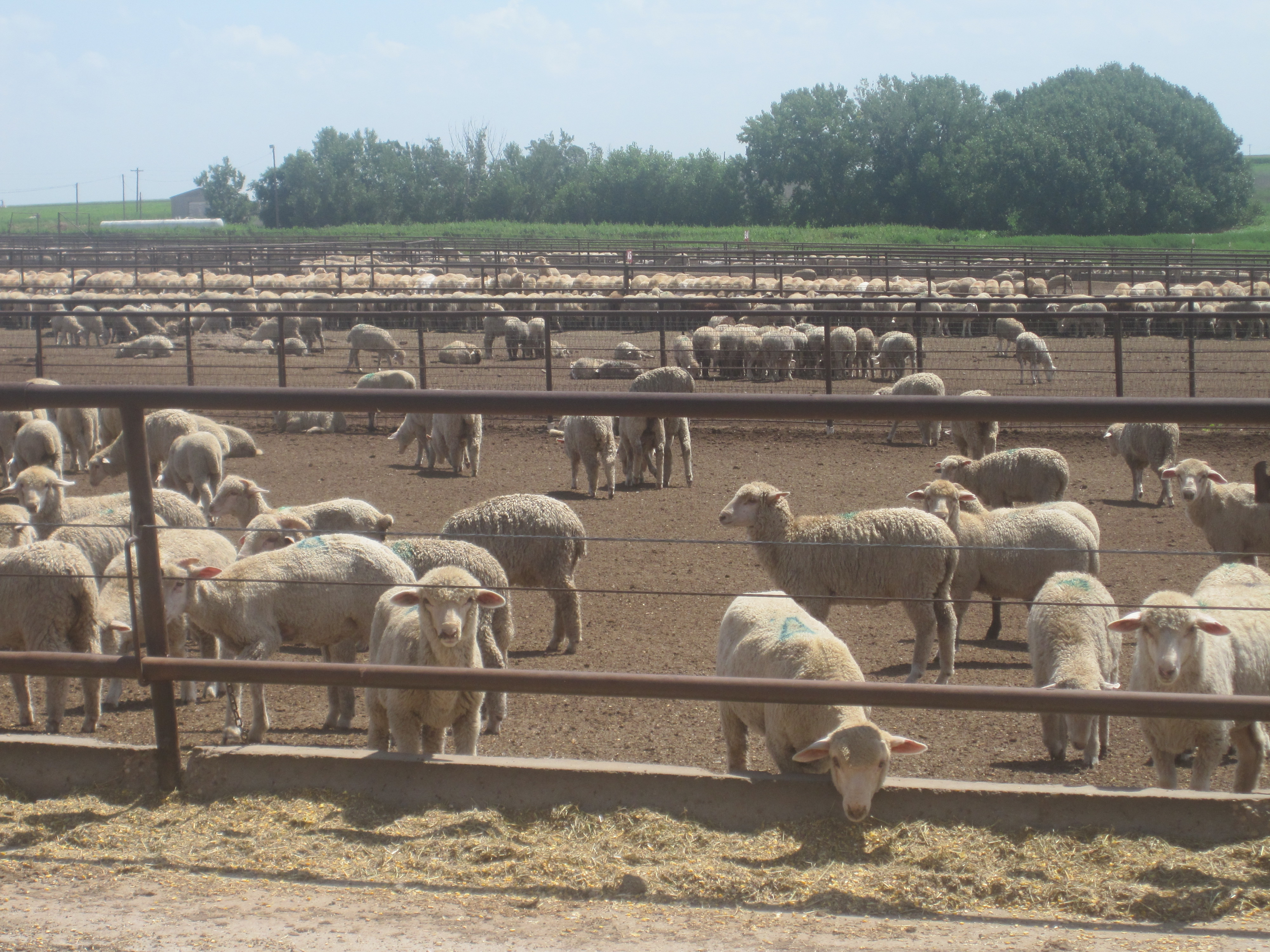
Sheep feed lot south of Dimmitt

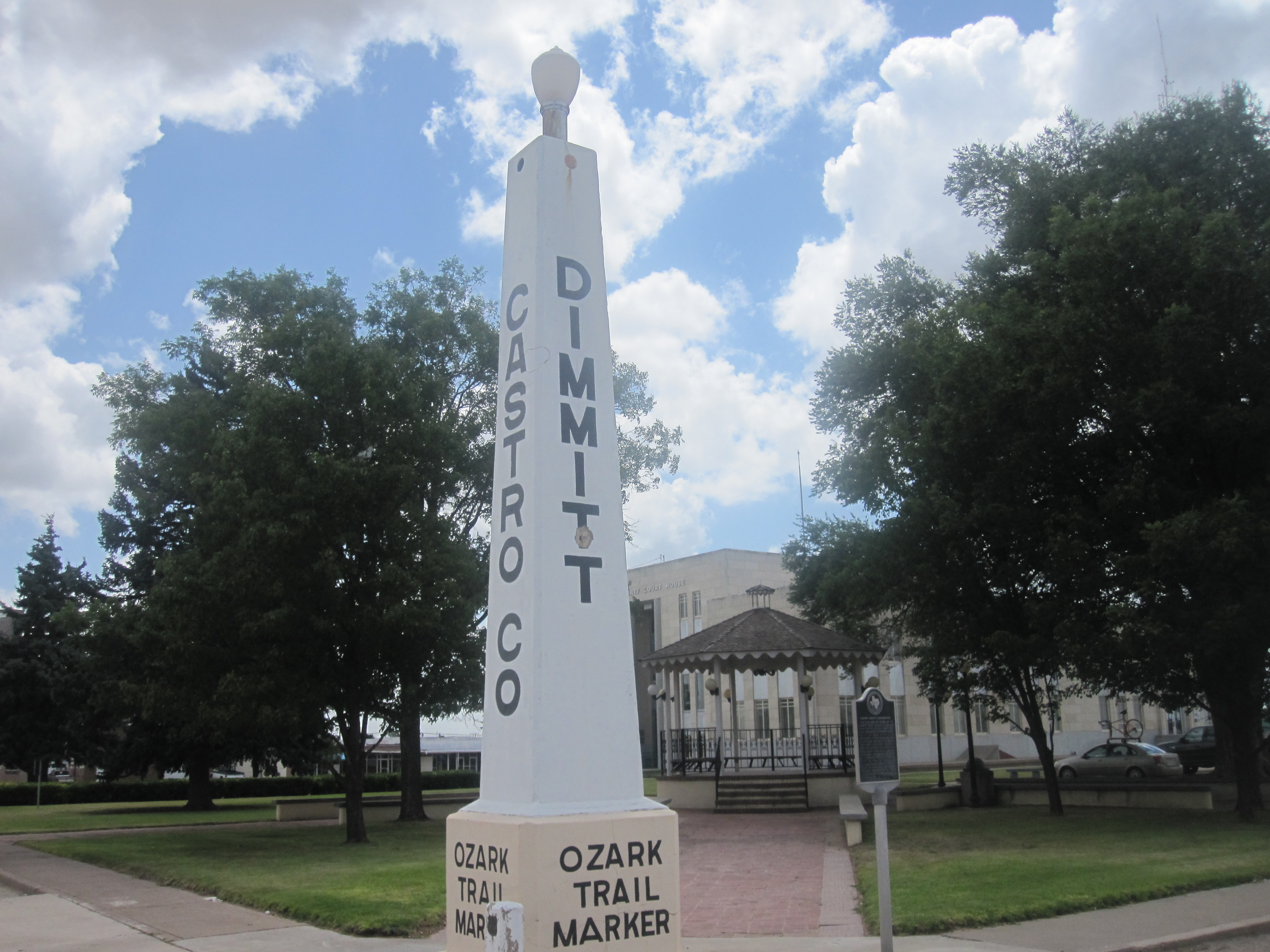
Ozark Trail in Dimmitt

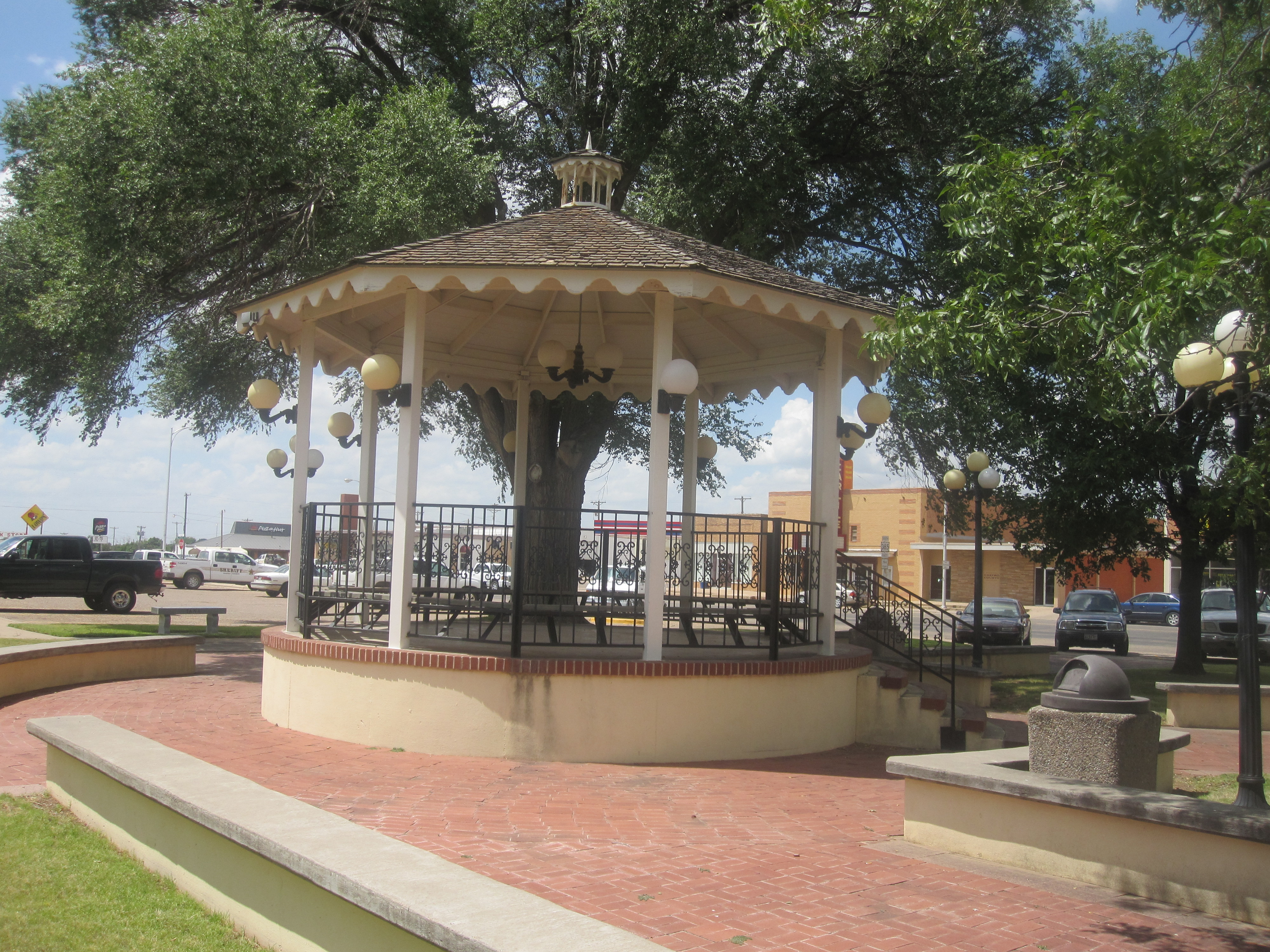
Gazebo at courthouse square in Dimmitt

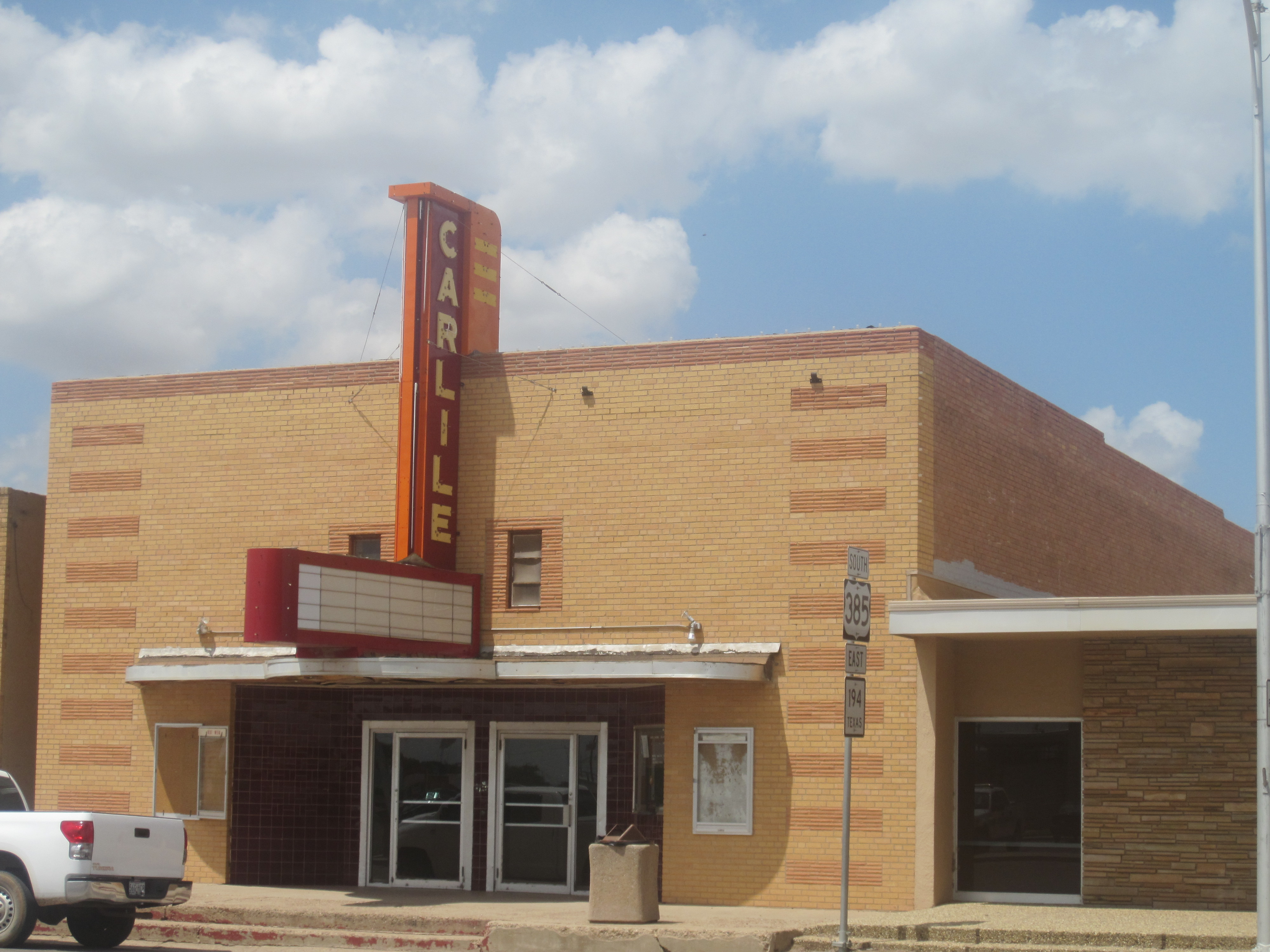
Former Carlile Theater in Dimmitt

== See also ==
- Dimmitt (meteorite)
