= Bill W. Clayton =

American politician (1928–2007)

Speaker of the Texas House of Representatives
- In office January 14, 1975 – January 11, 1983
- Preceded by: Price Daniel Jr.
- Succeeded by: Gib Lewis

Member of the Texas House of Representatives
- In office January 8, 1963 – January 11, 1983
- Preceded by: Max Carriker (91st district)
- Succeeded by: Bob Valles (74th district)
- Constituency: 91st district (1963–1967); 78th district (1967–1969); 72nd district (1969–1973); 74th district (1973–1983)

Personal details
- Born: September 11, 1928 Olney, Texas, U.S.
- Died: January 6, 2007 (aged 78) Lubbock, Texas, U.S.
- Resting place: Springlake Cemetery
- Party: Republican (after 1985); Democratic (before 1985)
- Spouse: Delma Dennis (m. 1950)
- Children: 2
- Education: Texas A&M University; University of Texas at Austin
- Occupation: Farmer, politician, businessman, lobbyist

Bill Wayne Clayton (September 11, 1928 – January 6, 2007) was an American politician who served as a state legislator for 20 years and was the speaker of the Texas House of Representatives from 1975 to 1983, a tenure twice as long as that of any other presiding officer of the house elected before him. A Conservative Democrat from a rural area of the Texas South Plains, Clayton attained the speakership by successfully forging a broad-based House coalition.

== Early life ==
Clayton was born on September 11, 1928, in Olney near Graham in Young County in North Texas to William Thomas Clayton and the former Myrtle Chitwood. He grew up in tiny Springlake in Lamb County. He graduated from the Springlake-Earth High School and then attended Texas A&M University in College Station, where he earned a degree in agricultural economics. After college graduation in 1950, he returned to Springlake to help manage the family farm. Eventually, Clayton expanded his agricultural operations and became involved in diversified business enterprises.

Clayton married Delma J. Dennis on March 11, 1950. Together, they had two children, Tommy and Brenda. At the time of his death, Clayton had five grandchildren and seven great-grandchildren.

== Political career ==
In Lamb County, Clayton participated in precinct and county politics and served as a delegate for Lyndon B. Johnson at the 1960 Democratic National Convention in Los Angeles. Two years later, Clayton was elected to the seat vacated by State Representative Jesse M. Osborne. He went on to be re-elected nine times.

Clayton, a leading spokesman on water issues, sponsored major legislation addressing the state's need for increased water resources and effective conservation programs. He also promoted these issues as a delegate to regional and national conferences on water. He was the president of the Interstate Conference on Water Problems.

=== Speaker of the House ===
After 12 years in the Texas House, Clayton was elected Texas House Speaker in 1975, in which capacity he worked to modernize House operations. He implemented a more streamlined, cost-efficient system of house administration. Texas' lawmakers were provided with more support services and advanced computerization of legislative information further facilitated their work. Clayton refurbished press facilities in the Texas State Capitol and acquired additional office space for legislative agencies, House operating staff, and House committees.

In reforming House rules and policies, Clayton placed particular emphasis on expanding the role of the standing (permanent) House committees. He initiated the issuance of interim charges to those committees, directing the committees to conduct research on legislative issues between regular legislative sessions. Clayton delegated to standing committees additional budgetary and oversight responsibilities for state agencies and institutions under their jurisdiction. By the modification of the method of reviewing appropriations bills, he allowed legislators more participation in the budgeting process. Another policy change instituted by Clayton permits House members to file bills in advance of the session, thereby reducing excessive paperwork and printing when the legislature convenes.

Clayton also served as vice chairman, along with Lieutenant Governor Bill Hobby, of the Joint Advisory Committee on Governmental Operations, known as the Hobby-Clayton Commission. As a result of one of its recommendations, the next legislature passed the Texas Sunset Act, which created the Sunset Advisory Commission.

While he was speaker, Clayton served as chairman of both the Southern Legislative Conference and the Council of State Governments.

== Later years ==
Although Clayton chose not to pursue elective office again in 1982, he maintained his active interest in legislative affairs. In 1985, Clayton switched to the Republican Party, and four years later, he was appointed by Governor Bill Clements to serve as a regent of the Texas A&M University System.

In May 2000, the Amarillo Globe News named Clayton to its 20th-century History Makers of the High Plains listing.

Texas House of Representatives
Preceded by Max Carriker	Member of the Texas House of Representatives from District 91 (Springlake); 1963–1967	Succeeded by W. J. Blythe Jr.
Preceded by Roger D. Brown	Member of the Texas House of Representatives from District 78 (Springlake); 1967–1969	Succeeded by Ralph Wayne
Preceded by Robert Temple Dickson III	Member of the Texas House of Representatives from District 72 (Springlake); 1969–1973	Succeeded by 72-1: Ralph Scoggins; 72-2: Charles Tupper, Jr. 72-3: Ronald D. Coleman; 72-4: Luther Jones
Preceded by Inactive district	Member of the Texas House of Representatives from District 74 (Springlake); 1973–1983	Succeeded by Robert Valles
Political offices
Preceded by Price Daniel Jr.	Speaker of the Texas House of Representatives; 1975–1983	Succeeded by Gib Lewis
