= Connie Baird =

American football quarterback (1934–2023)

Profile
- Position: End

Personal information
- Born: April 28, 1934; Rule, Texas, U.S.
- Died: July 6, 2023 (aged 89)
- Listed height: 6 ft 3 in (1.91 m)
- Listed weight: 193 lb (88 kg)

Career information
- High school: Amherst (TX)
- College: Hardin–Simmons Cowboys (1953-1956)

Career history
- Baltimore Colts (1957)*
- * Offseason or practice squad member only

Connie Gene Baird (April 28, 1934 - July 6, 2023) was an American football end. He played for the Hardin–Simmons Cowboys and ranked third in college football in receiving in 1956.

== Early life ==
Baird was born in Rule, Texas. His family moved to a cotton farm in Amherst, Texas, when Baird was five years old. He attended Amherst High School where he earned letters in both football and basketball.

== Hardin-Simmons ==
Baird played college football for the Hardin–Simmons Cowboys from 1953 to 1956. In 1956, he ranked among the leading receivers in major-college football with 37 receptions (3rd in country) and 455 receiving yards (5th in country). In three years as a varsity player at Hardin-Simmons, he tallied 71 receptions for 854 yards and four touchdowns. Head coach Sammy Baugh rated Baird as "one of the better ends I've coached, pro or college, and I've coached some pretty good ends."

== Later life ==
Baird was selected by the Baltimore Colts in the 23rd round of the 1957 NFL draft. He signed with th Colts in February 1957. He was drafted into the military in 1957 and did not appear in any games with the Colts.

Baird later worked in financial services, including positions with Ford Motor Credit Union, First National Bank of Abilene, and Southwest Savings. He was inducted into the Hardin Simmons Hall of Fame in 1999. Baird died in July 2023 at age 89.
