= Manny Ramirez (American football) =

American football player (born 1983)

Manny Ramírez
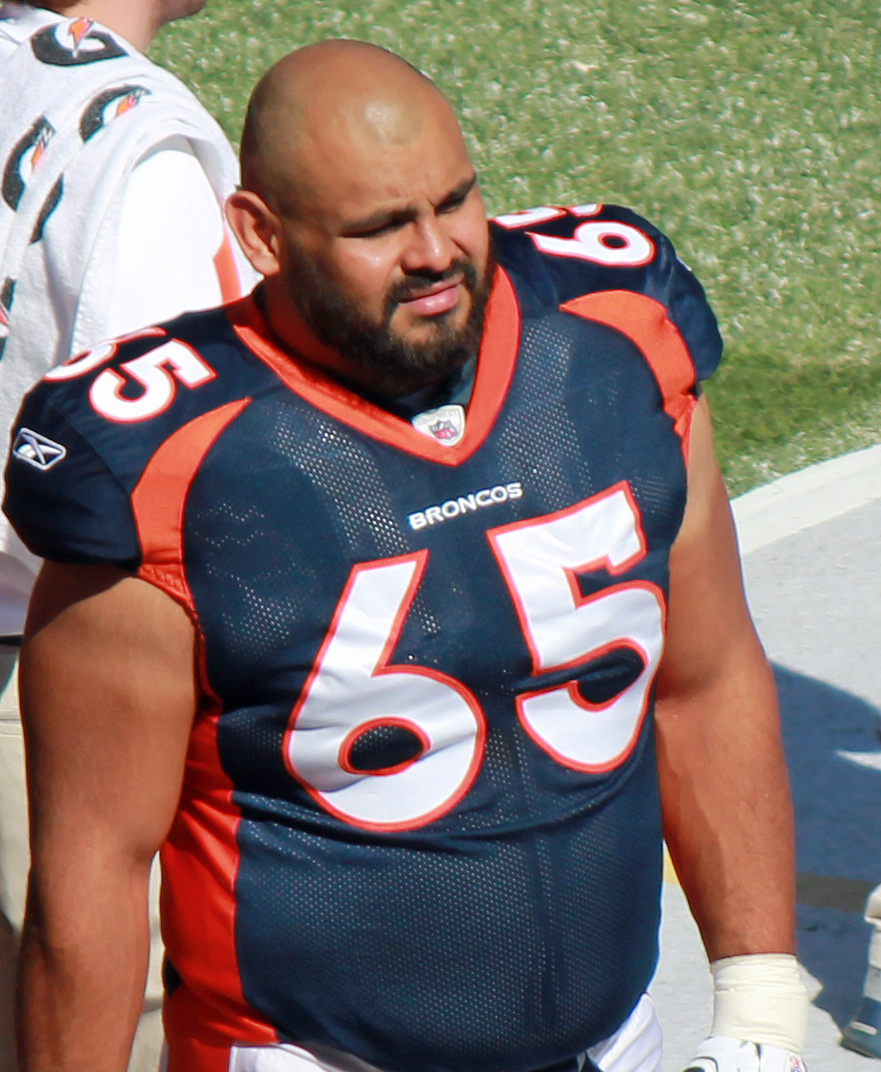
- Ramírez with the Denver Broncos in 2011

Jackson State Tigers
- Title: Co-offensive coordinator & offensive line coach

Personal information
- Born: February 19, 1983 (age 43); Houston, Texas, U.S.
- Listed height: 6 ft 3 in (1.91 m)
- Listed weight: 326 lb (148 kg)

Career information
- High school: Willowridge (Houston)
- College: Texas Tech
- NFL draft: 2007: 4th round, 117th overall pick

Career history

Playing
- Detroit Lions (2007–2010); Denver Broncos (2011–2014); Detroit Lions (2015); Chicago Bears (2016)*
- * Offseason or practice squad member only

Coaching
- Springlake-Earth HS (TX) (2019) Offensive coordinator & offensive line coach; Diamond Hill-Jarvis HS (TX) (2020) Offensive line coach; Texas Southern (2021–2023) Offensive line coach & run game coordinator; Jackson State (2024) Run game coordinator & offensive line coach; Jackson State (2025–present) Co-offensive coordinator & offensive line coach

Operations
- Texas Tech (2016–2018) Director of player development

Career NFL statistics
- Games played: 83
- Games started: 65
- Fumble recoveries: 1
- Stats at Pro Football Reference

Manuel S. Ramírez (born February 19, 1983) is an American former professional football player who was a guard in the National Football League (NFL) for nine years. He is the run game coordinator and offensive line coach for the Jackson State Tigers, a position he has held since 2024. Ramirez was selected by the Detroit Lions in the fourth round of the 2007 NFL draft. He played college football for the Texas Tech Red Raiders. He had also played for the Denver Broncos.

== Early life ==
Ramírez grew up in Houston, Texas. He attended Willowridge High School where he was named First-team All-District 20-5A two years in a row. In addition, he was named the 6th best center in the country by Rivals.com. During his senior year, Ramírez was recruited by Nebraska, Kansas State, UTEP, Houston, and Iowa State but committed to Texas Tech.

== College career ==
As a redshirt freshman in 2003, Ramírez started 10 games, making his first start against SMU and capped off the season with a start in the 2003 Houston Bowl. During the next three years, he started all 36 regular season games along with starts in the 2004 Holiday Bowl, the 2005 Cotton Bowl Classic and the 2006 Insight Bowl. Ramírez was named a 2nd Team All-Big 12 Offensive Lineman in 2005. Ramírez began the 2006 season on the Outland Trophy Watch list in 2006, and was named to the All-Big 12 Preseason First-team. He concluded the 2006 season being named to the All-Big 12 Honorable Mention Team.

He set the school bench press record in 2003 by pressing 525 pounds. Ramírez tied that record the following year. In 2005, Ramírez broke his own bench press record by pressing 550 pounds at the Annual Texas Tech "Night of Champions".

Ramírez finished 2006 on an offensive line that allowed the fewest sacks, 16, since the 2000 season.

=== 2006 Insight Bowl ===
Ramírez played in the 2006 Insight Bowl which saw the biggest comeback in NCAA Division-I bowl history. The Red Raiders overcame a 31-point third-quarter deficit to beat their opponent by 3 in overtime. The winning touchdown was a 3-yard run from Shannon Woods behind a block by Ramírez.

=== Post Texas Tech career ===
Ramírez entered the 2007 NFL draft following the completion of the 2006 season. He was listed as the number four overall offensive guard prospect by ESPN Insider. Ramírez accepted an invitation to the 2007 Under Armour Senior Bowl, a post-season exhibition game, played in Mobile, Alabama. Ramírez also accepted an invitation to the 2007 NFL Combine, held February 21–27, 2007 at the RCA Dome in Indianapolis.

== Professional career ==
=== Detroit Lions (first stint) ===
Ramírez was selected by the Detroit Lions with the 117th overall pick in the fourth round of the 2007 NFL draft. Detroit traded two of their three fifth-round selections (139th and 154th overall) to the St. Louis Rams for their fourth-round selection (117th overall) in order to select Ramírez. In October 2010, Ramírez was named the Detroit Lions starting right guard.

=== Denver Broncos ===
On January 4, 2011, Ramírez was signed by the Denver Broncos. On March 19, 2012, the Broncos signed Ramirez.

In 2013, Ramírez won the starting center job after Dan Koppen tore his ACL during training camp. On September 12, 2013, he signed a two-year contract extension with the Broncos. In Super Bowl XLVIII, Ramirez could not hear the play call of Peyton Manning, which resulted in Ramirez snapping the ball early, over the head of Manning, into the end zone for a safety and giving the Seattle Seahawks a 2–0 lead just twelve seconds into the game. The Broncos would not recover and would go on to lose the game, 43–8.

=== Detroit Lions (second stint) ===
On April 30, 2015, Broncos traded Ramirez, as well as, their first and fifth-round 2015 NFL draft selections (28th and 143rd overall, respectively) and their fifth-round selection in the 2016 NFL draft for the Lions' first round pick in the 2015 NFL draft (23rd overall) in order for Broncos to select linebacker Shane Ray. The Lions in turn selected offensive lineman Laken Tomlinson with the 28th pick.

=== Chicago Bears ===
Ramirez signed with the Chicago Bears on March 30, 2016. His contract was for 1-year and was worth up to $965,000, with an $80,000 signing bonus and only $80,000 guaranteed.

=== Retirement ===
On June 8, 2016, Ramirez announced his retirement from the NFL. He later joined the support staff at his alma mater Texas Tech as their director of player development.

== Personal life ==
Ramírez majored in exercise sport science and was married in July 2006 to Iris Castillo. He is of Mexican-American descent.
