= Oletha =

Oletha may refer to:

- Oletha Faust-Goudeau (born 1959), American politician
- Oletha, Texas, United States, an unincorporated community
