= 1990 Texas House of Representatives election =

- November 6, 1990

All 150 seats in the Texas House of Representatives 76 seats needed for a majority
	Majority party	Minority party
Leader	Gib Lewis	Tom Craddick
Party	Democratic	Republican
Leader since	January 11, 1983	January 9, 1973
Leader's seat	89th	82nd
Last election	93	57
Seats before	91	59
Seats won	93	57
Seat change	▲2	▼2
- Democratic hold Democratic gain Republican hold Republican gain
Speaker before election
Gib Lewis
Democratic
Elected Speaker
Gib Lewis
Democratic

The 1990 Texas House of Representatives elections took place as part of the biennial United States elections. Texas voters elected state representatives in all 150 State House of Representatives districts. The winners of this election served in the 72rd Texas Legislature, with seats apportioned according to the 1980 United States census. State representatives serve for two-year terms. Democrats increased their majority to 93 out of 150 seats.

== Background ==
Democrats had held control of the Texas House of Representatives since Reconstruction. Republicans won 57 seats in the 1988 election, but they gained two more due to special elections in Harris County in early 1989, increasing their caucus to 59 out of 150 seats.

== Results ==
Despite high Republican hopes of making gains in the House, owing to the popularity of president George H. W. Bush in the state and the coattails of popular Senator Phil Gramm, Democrats instead gained seats in the chamber for the first time in a decade. With the victory of Ann Richards in the concurrent gubernatorial election, Democrats regained a government trifecta and with it, full control of the upcoming decennial redistricting.
