= Springlake-Earth High School =

Location
- FM 2901 & FM 302; Earth, Texas 79031-0130; United States; 34.2610°N 102.3587°W

Information
- School type: Public high school
- School district: Springlake-Earth Independent School District
- Principal: Cindy Furr
- Teaching staff: 15.18 (on an FTE basis)
- Grades: 8-12
- Enrollment: 121 (2023-2024)
- Student to teacher ratio: 7.97
- Colors: Green & gold
- Athletics conference: UIL Class 1A
- Mascot: Welma The Wolverine
- Website: www.springlake-earth.org

Springlake-Earth High School is a public high school located 2.5 miles (4.0 km) east of Earth, Texas, United States and classified as a 1A school by the UIL. It is part of the Springlake-Earth Independent School District located in north central Lamb County and serves students from the cities of Springlake and Earth. In 2015, the school was rated "Met Standard" by the Texas Education Agency.

== History ==
Although the school was founded as Springlake in 1924, the Earth Cack of Commerce in 1966 offered to buy a lighted sign to be placed on Highway 70 indicating the location of the school if the name of the school were changed to include Earth. The board of trustees agreed, and in that same year, the name "Springlake-Earth" was adopted.

== Athletics ==
The Springlake-Earth Wolverines compete in these sports:

- Basketball
- Cross country
- Football
- Golf
- Tennis
- Track and field
- Baseball

=== State titles ===
- Girls basketball
  - 1967(1A), 1968(1A)

==== State finalists ====
- Girls basketball
  - 1966(1A)

==== State semifinalists ====
- Boys basketball
  - 1995(2A)
