= Springlake, Texas =

- Town
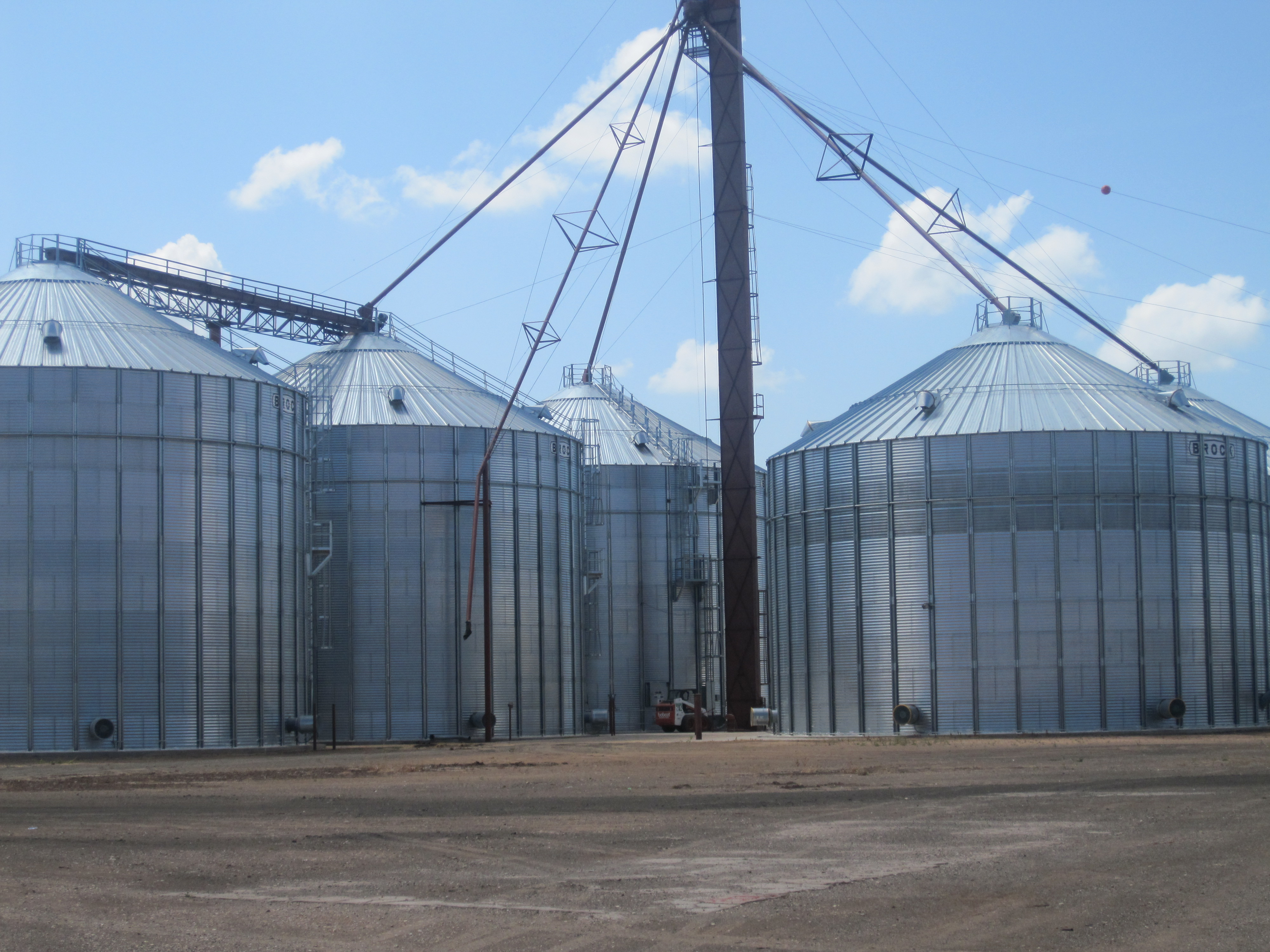
- Grain silos in Springlake, Texas

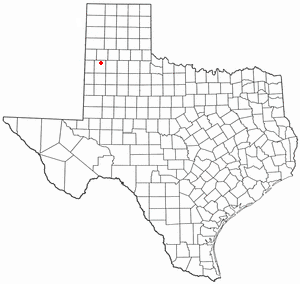
- Location of Springlake, Texas

- Coordinates: 34°13′52″N 102°18′17″W
- Country: United States
- State: Texas
- County: Lamb

Area
  - Total: 1.03 sq mi (2.66 km^{2})
  - Land: 1.03 sq mi (2.66 km^{2})
  - Water: 0 sq mi (0.00 km^{2})
- Elevation: 3,681 ft (1,122 m)

Population (2020)
  - Total: 145
  - Density: 141/sq mi (54.5/km^{2})
- Time zone: UTC-6 (Central (CST))
  - Summer (DST): UTC-5 (CDT)
- ZIP code: 79082
- Area code: 806
- FIPS code: 48-69764
- GNIS feature ID: 1369043

Springlake is a town in Lamb County, Texas, United States at the crossroads of US Highways 70 and 385. The population was 145 at the 2020 census. The community is known for its agricultural processing and its yearly Independence Day parade and celebration culminating in a large fireworks display headed by the Springlake Volunteer Fire Department. This celebration usually draws several thousand participants who come together to enjoy hamburgers and hot dogs cooked by the Fire Department as a fundraiser, a free live band, a baked goods auction, and fellowship.

It was the hometown of the late Speaker of the Texas House of Representatives, Bill W. Clayton.

== Geography ==
According to the United States Census Bureau, the town has a total area of 1.0 square mile (2.6 km^{2}), all of it land.

== Demographics ==
Historical population
| Census | Pop. | Note | %± |
|---|---|---|---|
| 1960 | 245 | | — |
| 1970 | 209 | | −14.7% |
| 1980 | 222 | | 6.2% |
| 1990 | 132 | | −40.5% |
| 2000 | 135 | | 2.3% |
| 2010 | 108 | | −20.0% |
| 2020 | 145 | | 34.3% |
U.S. Decennial Census; 2020 Census

As of the census of 2000, there were 135 people, 54 households, and 38 families residing in the town. The population density was 132.6 inhabitants per square mile (51.2/km^{2}). There were 68 housing units at an average density of 66.8 per square mile (25.8/km^{2}). The racial makeup of the town was 80.00% White, 0.74% African American, 19.26% from other races. Hispanic or Latino of any race were 33.33% of the population.

There were 54 households, out of which 33.3% had children under the age of 18 living with them, 63.0% were married couples living together, 5.6% had a female householder with no husband present, and 29.6% were non-families. 25.9% of all households were made up of individuals, and 7.4% had someone living alone who was 65 years of age or older. The average household size was 2.50 and the average family size was 3.08.

In the town, the population was spread out, with 30.4% under the age of 18, 4.4% from 18 to 24, 28.1% from 25 to 44, 23.0% from 45 to 64, and 14.1% who were 65 years of age or older. The median age was 38 years. For every 100 females, there were 101.5 males. For every 100 females age 18 and over, there were 100.0 males.

The median income for a household in the town was $20,000, and the median income for a family was $20,625. Males had a median income of $31,875 versus $13,125 for females. The per capita income for the town was $7,841. There were 34.3% of families and 42.0% of the population living below the poverty line, including 51.9% of under eighteens and 35.7% of those over 64.

== Education ==
The Town of Springlake is served by the Springlake-Earth Independent School District.

== See also ==
- Earth, Texas
- Plant X
