= Charles Tupper (disambiguation) =

Charles Tupper (1821–1915) served as the sixth prime minister of Canada.

Other people with the name include:

- Charles F. Tupper (1852–1929), American lawyer and politician
- Charles Hibbert Tupper (1855–1927), Canadian politician, member of the House of Commons for Pictou, and son of the prime minister
- Charles H. P. Tupper (1887–1950), Canadian politician, MLA for British Columbia
- Charles Tupper Jr. (born 1942), American politician, member of the Texas House of Representatives

== See also ==
- Sir Charles Tupper Building, Ottawa, Ontario
- Sir Charles Tupper Secondary School, Vancouver, British Columbia
