= Gib Lewis =

American politician

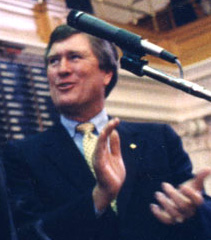

Speaker of the Texas House of Representatives
- In office January 11, 1983 – January 12, 1993
- Preceded by: Bill W. Clayton
- Succeeded by: Pete Laney

Member of the Texas House of Representatives from Tarrant County
- In office January 12, 1971 – January 12, 1993
- Preceded by: Robert M. Burnett
- Succeeded by: Homer Dear (District 89)

Personal details
- Born: August 22, 1936 (age 90) Oletha, Texas, U.S.
- Party: Democratic
- Spouse: Sandra Majors Lewis
- Children: 2
- Education: Texas Christian University

Military service
- Allegiance: United States
- Branch/service: United States Air Force
- Years of service: 1957–1961

Gibson Donald "Gib" Lewis (born August 22, 1936) is an American politician and political consultant from Fort Worth, Texas. He was the first person to be elected five times as the speaker of the Texas House of Representatives, but he did not seek reelection in 1992, in compliance with a plea bargain agreement connected with his misdemeanor conviction of a violation of Texas financial disclosure law.

== Early life and education ==
Lewis was born in Oletha in Limestone County, Texas, and raised in Mexia, Texas and Cleveland, Texas, where he graduated in 1955 from Cleveland High School. He then enrolled at Sam Houston State College. Lewis later enlisted in the United States Air Force and went on to serve as a B-52 aerial gunner. While stationed at Carswell Air Force Base, he continued his studies at Texas Christian University.

== Career ==
Lewis was discharged from the U.S. Air Force in 1961. He then took a job as a salesman for a paper company and three years later, opened his own firm specializing in pressure-sensitive labels and decals. It grew into a multimillion-dollar business. Lewis continues as president of Lewis Label Products, Inc., today, three decades after its founding.

Since leaving the state legislature, he has lobbied state government on behalf of private clients.

He is the namesake of the Gibson D. Lewis Health Science Library at the University of North Texas Health Science Center and the Gib Lewis Prison Unit in Woodville, Texas.

=== Politics ===
Lewis was elected Speaker in 1983 to succeed Bill W. Clayton of Springlake, Lamb County. He was a key figure in passing the 1984 education act, designed by Ross Perot and Democratic Governor Mark White, hailed at the time as one of the most sweeping public education reforms in Texas history. He was instrumental in the passage of the 1985 comprehensive Texas Water Plan. He later promoted legislation to combat crime, including stricter laws against drunk drivers. An avid sportsman, Lewis carried legislation creating the "Operation Game Thief" program and was a sponsor of the Uniform Game Management Act.

In 1969, Lewis was elected to the River Oaks City Council. He arrived the next year in Fort Worth, the county seat of Tarrant County.

In 1970, Lewis was elected to the House from Tarrant County. In 1973, he was named chairman of the House Natural Resources Committee. In 1977, he chaired the House Committee on Intergovernmental Affairs.

== Legal issues ==
=== Conviction on ethics charges ===
In January 1992, Lewis pleaded no contest to two charges alleging that he illegally accepted a gift from a prominent law firm in San Antonio, Texas, and failed to disclose the money on official financial reports filed with the state. As part of a plea bargain, Lewis agreed to not seek reelection and to pay a fine of $1,000 for each charge.

=== DWI arrest ===
In June 2009, Lewis was arrested in the capital city of Austin, on probable cause of driving while intoxicated. His breathalyzer test indicated a blood alcohol content (BAC) level of 0.16 g/dl, twice the legal limit in Texas.

== Personal life ==
Lewis is married to the former Sandra Majors. They have two daughters.

Texas House of Representatives
| Preceded by Robert M. “Bob" Burnett | Member of the Texas House of Representatives from District 52-4 (Fort Worth); 1971–1973 | Succeeded by Obsolete district |
| Preceded by Obsolete district | Member of the Texas House of Representatives from District 32-4 (Fort Worth); 1973–1977 | Succeeded by Obsolete district |
| Preceded by Obsolete district | Member of the Texas House of Representatives from District 32-E (Fort Worth); 1977–1979 | Succeeded by Charles Evans |
| Preceded by Roy English | Member of the Texas House of Representatives from District 32-G (Fort Worth); 1979–1983 | Succeeded by Obsolete district |
| Preceded by Senfronia Thompson | Member of the Texas House of Representatives from District 89 (Fort Worth); 1983–1993 | Succeeded by Homer Dear |
Political offices
| Preceded by Bill Clayton | Speaker of the Texas House of Representatives; 1983-1993 | Succeeded by Pete Laney |
