= Carriker =

Carriker is a surname. Notable people with the surname include:

- Adam Carriker (born 1984), American football player
- Max Carriker (1921–1979), American politician
- Melbourne Armstrong Carriker (1879–1965), American ornithologist and entomologist
