= Dan Hewitt Owens =

American actor, director, and screenwriter

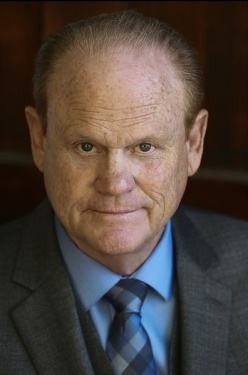
- Born: July 5, 1947 (age 78); Amherst, Texas, U.S.
- Occupation: Actor
- Years active: 1972–present

Dan Hewitt Owens (born July 5, 1947) is an American actor, director and screenwriter. He has had a film and TV career for over 40 years and has won awards as a film director, screenwriter, producer, and cinematographer.

== Early life ==
Owens was born in Amherst, Texas, in 1947, the son of Bon Hardy (née Chambers) and Floyd Russell "Pete" Owens. Owens grew up in Fort Worth, Texas. He has two brothers. He graduated from R. L. Paschal High School in 1965, where he lettered in football.

Owens served in the United States Marine Corps Reserve from 1966 to 1972.

== Career ==
He began as an actor working on stage continuing to film, episodic television, soap operas, and TV commercials. He appeared in LBJ, Our Brand is Crisis, Dark Places, Last Vegas, and Project Puppies for Christmas. With numerous TV credits, he most recently guest starred on Adam Ruins Everything and co-starred on episodes of Parks and Recreation and Criminal Minds.

== Filmography ==
=== Film ===
Year	Title	Role	Notes
1973	Book of Numbers	Bailiff	
1974	Sistemo l'America e torno	Police Officer	
1975	Race with the Devil	Jay	Uncredited
2013	5 Hour Friends	Dan	
2013	Last Vegas	Security Guard	
2014	Alongside Night	Danny	
2015	Dark Places	Robert	
2015	Our Brand Is Crisis	American IMF Man #1	
2015	Killers at Play	Dan Thomas	
2015	Inner Fear	Uncle Bob	
2016	$elfie Shootout	Daniel Morehead / Ronald Morehead	
2016	The Rally-LA	Foreman Joe	
2016	LBJ	Abe Fortas	
2019	Project: Puppies for Christmas	Pastor Nelson	
2020	1 Interrogation	Detective Bill Daniels	

=== Television ===
Year	Title	Role	Notes
1981	CHiPs	Kelly Shaw	Episode: "Diamond in the Rough"
1983	AfterMASH	Policeman	Episode: "September of '53/Together Again"
1984	A Streetcar Named Desire	Voice	Television film
1984	Lottery!	Coleman's Pal	Episode: "Minneapolis: Six Months Down"
1984	Santa Barbara	Oil Rig Worker	Episode #1.11
1984	Scorned and Swindled	Voice	Television film
1984	Highway to Heaven	Gas Station Owner	Episode: "Dust Child"
1996	Walker, Texas Ranger	Manager	Episode: "Hall of Fame"
1998	Still Holding On: The Legend of Cadillac Jack	Juror #1	Television film
2012	Criminal Minds	Steve	Episode: "Profiling 101"
2013	Parks and Recreation	Lev	Episode: "Recall Vote"
2018	Adam Ruins Everything	Farmer	Episode: "Adam Ruins Tech"
