= Ed J. Carpenter =

American politician (1900–1965)

Ed J. Carpenter (2 May 1900 – 11 May 1965) was an American politician from Texas.

Carpenter was born in the community of Vincent, Texas, on 2 May 1900. He later moved to Coahoma and became a rancher. Carpenter served as a judge on the Howard County Court for eight years, before winning a state legislative election in 1962 as a Democratic member of the Texas House of Representatives from District 78. He died in office on 11 May 1965, necessitating a special election won by Roger D. Brown.
