= Gib Lewis Unit =

Texas state prison

- Location in Texas
- Location: 777 FM 3497 Woodville, Texas 75990; 30.7948000°N 094.3973167°W
- Status: Operational
- Security class: G1-G5, Administrative Segregation
- Capacity: 2,232
- Population: 2,215 (August, 2013)
- Opened: 1990
- Managed by: TDCJ Correctional Institutions Division
- Warden: Brian Smith
- Website: www.tdcj.state.tx.us/unit_directory/gl.html

Gib Lewis Unit a.k.a. Lewis Unit is a Texas state prison located approximately one mile east of Woodville, Texas, United States. The prison is located on approximately 360 acres and is operated by the Texas Department of Criminal Justice Correctional Institutions Division administered within Region I.

== History ==
The unit was opened in August 1990, and is named after Gib Lewis, a politician from Fort Worth, Texas.

== Facility ==
There are several different operations within the Lewis Unit including a woodworking shop and agricultural operations for security horses, security pack canines and a unit garden. There are also educational programs including a literacy program, adult basic education and GED program. Career and technology programs include electrical trades, heating, ventilation, air conditioning and refrigeration, mill and cabinet making.

Also offered are substance abuse education, support groups, mentoring, religious and faith based studies and activities through the support of volunteer initiatives.
