= Amherst, Texas =

- City
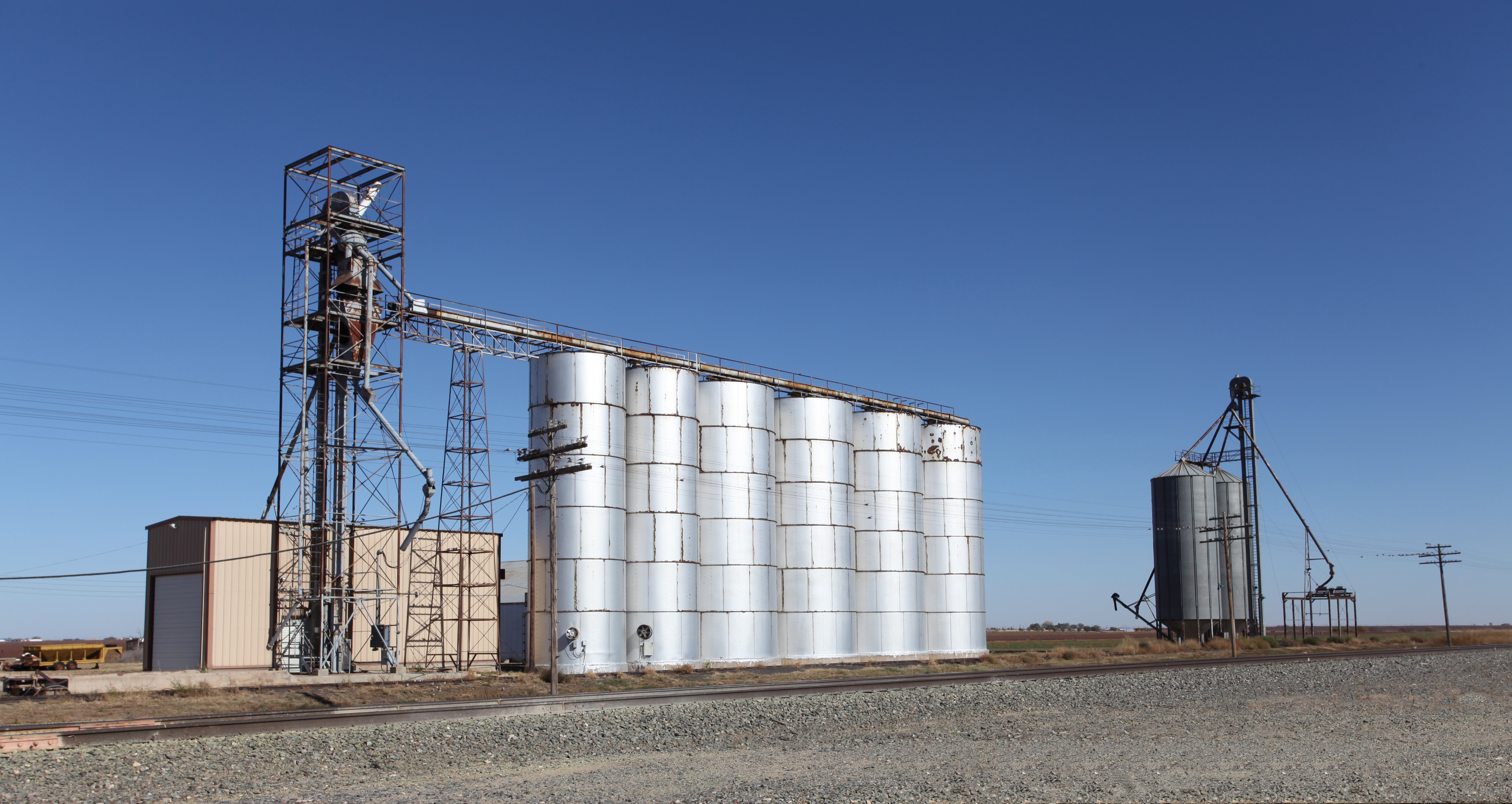
- Grain elevators of Amherst
- Interactive map of Amherst, Texas
- Location within Texas
- Coordinates: 34°00′37″N 102°24′56″W
- Country: United States
- State: Texas
- County: Lamb
- Region: Llano Estacado
- Established: 1923

Area
  - Total: 0.92 sq mi (2.37 km^{2})
  - Land: 0.92 sq mi (2.37 km^{2})
  - Water: 0 sq mi (0.00 km^{2})
- Elevation: 3,652 ft (1,113 m)

Population (2020)
  - Total: 678
  - Density: 741/sq mi (286/km^{2})
- Time zone: UTC-6 (CST)
- ZIP code: 79312
- Area code: 806
- FIPS code: 48-03084
- Website: www.cityofamherst.com

Amherst is a city in Lamb County, Texas, United States. The population was 678 at the 2020 census.

== History ==
Amherst, on U.S. Route 84 and the BNSF Railway in west central Lamb County, began in 1913 as a Pecos and Northern Texas Railway station for William E. Halsell's Mashed O Ranch. A townsite was platted a mile from the Santa Fe depot in 1923 and named for Amherst College by a railroad official. The post office opened in 1924. By 1930, thirty-five businesses and 964 people constituted a lively trade center, and amenities included a newspaper, the Amherst Argus. For many years the Amherst Hotel, the town's first permanent building, was the most popular stopping place between Clovis, New Mexico and Lubbock, Texas. The population in Amherst was 749 in 1940, when the first co-op hospital in Texas was built there. Incorporation came in 1970, when the population was 825. In 1980, the population was 971, and businesses included five cotton gins and two grain elevators. Sod House Spring Monument, commemorating the first cow camp in the area, is located 6 miles (10 km) northwest of Amherst, and Plant X, one of Southwestern Public Service's largest generating plants, is nine miles north.

== Geography ==
Amherst is in central Lamb County, 8 miles (13 km) northwest of Littlefield, the county seat, and 24 miles (39 km) southeast of Muleshoe. U.S. Route 84 passes just southwest of Amherst, connecting Littlefield and Muleshoe.

According to the U.S. Census Bureau, Amherst has an area of 0.93 square miles (2.4 km^{2}), all land.

=== Climate ===
According to the Köppen Climate Classification system, Amherst has a semi-arid climate, abbreviated "BSk" on climate maps.

== Demographics ==
Historical population
Census	Pop.	Note	%±
1930	964		—
1940	749		−22.3%
1950	922		23.1%
1960	883		−4.2%
1970	825		−6.6%
1980	971		17.7%
1990	742		−23.6%
2000	791		6.6%
2010	721		−8.8%
2020	678		−6.0%
U.S. Decennial Census; 2020 Census

=== 2020 census ===
As of the 2020 census, Amherst had a population of 678. The median age was 44.0 years. 23.0% of residents were under the age of 18 and 21.1% of residents were 65 years of age or older. For every 100 females there were 107.3 males, and for every 100 females age 18 and over there were 104.7 males age 18 and over.

0% of residents lived in urban areas, while 100.0% lived in rural areas.

There were 253 households in Amherst, of which 36.4% had children under the age of 18 living in them. Of all households, 46.2% were married-couple households, 24.5% were households with a male householder and no spouse or partner present, and 23.7% were households with a female householder and no spouse or partner present. About 23.7% of all households were made up of individuals and 11.0% had someone living alone who was 65 years of age or older.

There were 306 housing units, of which 17.3% were vacant. Among occupied housing units, 68.8% were owner-occupied and 31.2% were renter-occupied. The homeowner vacancy rate was 0.5% and the rental vacancy rate was 11.2%.

Racial composition as of the 2020 census
Race	Percent
White	47.3%
Black or African American	5.2%
American Indian and Alaska Native	0%
Asian	0%
Native Hawaiian and Other Pacific Islander	0.1%
Some other race	26.3%
Two or more races	21.1%
Hispanic or Latino (of any race)	65.3%

=== 2000 census ===
As of the 2000 census, there were 791 people, 269 households, and 210 families residing in the city. The population density was 951.4 inhabitants per square mile (367.3/km^{2}). There were 341 housing units at an average density of 410.2 per square mile (158.4/km^{2}). The racial makeup of the city was 68.90% White, 9.36% African American, 0.25% Native American, 21.11% from other races, and 0.38% from two or more races. Hispanic or Latino of any race were 39.95% of the population.

There were 269 households, out of which 36.1% had children under the age of 18 living with them, 62.1% were married couples living together, 11.5% had a female householder with no husband present, and 21.6% were non-families. 20.1% of all households were made up of individuals, and 10.8% had someone living alone who was 65 years of age or older. The average household size was 2.83 and the average family size was 3.25.

In the city, the population was spread out, with 31.2% under the age of 18, 7.5% from 18 to 24, 24.3% from 25 to 44, 18.1% from 45 to 64, and 19.0% who were 65 years of age or older. The median age was 34 years. For every 100 females, there were 87.0 males. For every 100 females age 18 and over, there were 83.8 males.

The median income for a household in the city was $24,276, and the median income for a family was $25,714. Males had a median income of $22,625 versus $19,063 for females. The per capita income for the city was $9,911. About 25.0% of families and 31.7% of the population were below the poverty line, including 45.8% of those under age 18 and 8.4% of those age 65 or over.

== Education ==
The city is served by the Amherst Independent School District.

== Notable people ==
- Dan Hewitt Owens (born 1947), actor, director and screenwriter
