= Roger D. Brown =

American politician

Roger Dale Brown is an American former politician.

Roger Brown was a resident of Big Spring, Texas. A Democrat, he won a special election to the Texas House of Representatives on May 26, 1965 and was sworn into office on July 6, 1965, succeeding Ed J. Carpenter, who had died in office, as legislator from District 78. He served until January 10, 1967.
