= Ralph Wayne =

American politician (1932–2024)

Ralph Erskine Wayne (December 14, 1932 – December 19, 2024) was an American politician.

Throughout his tenure on the Texas House of Representatives, Wayne lived in Plainview, Texas. Wayne was sworn into office for the first of his four consecutive terms in November 1964, as a Democratic legislator from District 89. Wayne then served his second term representing District 79, and subsequently won reelection twice thereafter for District 78.

Wayne died in Austin, Texas, on December 19, 2024, at the age of 92.
