= Oletha, Texas =

Unincorporated community in Texas, United States

Coordinates: 31°21′31″N 96°24′47″W

Oletha is an unincorporated community in Limestone County, Texas, originally settled in the 1850s under the name Pottersville. Texas State Highway 14 extends to Oletha via Farm to Market Road 1246.

Oletha was once described by a reporter for the Fort Worth Star-Telegram as "an eye-blinker of a town in East Central Texas". One notable person from Oletha is Gib Lewis, the first person to be elected five times as Speaker of the Texas House of Representatives.

Another colorful native of the town was Forrest Gibson, a convicted murderer known as "Goodeye" because he "had lost an eye in a fight in which Gibson had bitten his opponent's ear off".
