= Ralph Scoggins =

American politician

Ralph William "Skip" Scoggins (September 2 1931 - June 15, 2025) was an American former politician.

Scoggins was born in El Paso, Texas, on 2 September 1931. After serving in the United States Army Air Corps, he graduated from the University of Texas at El Paso and the University of Texas School of Law. Scoggins was affiliated with the Democratic Party, and served consecutive terms on the Texas House of Representatives from 1964 to 1969, then returned as a state representative between 1973 and 1975. His El Paso–based district was renumbered in all three of Scoggins's terms, from 74-5 to 67-5, then 72-1.
