= Springlake-Earth Independent School District =

School district in Texas

Springlake-Earth Independent School District is a public school district based in Earth, Texas (USA). Located in north central Lamb County, a portion of the district extends into Castro County.

== Schools ==
Springlake-Earth ISD has three campuses -

- Springlake-Earth High School (Grades 9-12)
- Springlake-Earth Middle School (Grades 6-8)
- Springlake-Earth Elementary School (Grades PK-5)

In 2009, the school district was rated "academically acceptable" by the Texas Education Agency.

== History ==
The district was created in 1923 by the consolidation of several small schools in the surrounding area, and initially named the Spring Lake district. The present name was adopted in 1966, when the Earth Chamber of Commerce agreed to purchase a lighted sign for the school, on the condition that the school name be changed to include Earth.
