= W. J. Blythe Jr. =

Texas politician

William Jackson Blythe Jr. (born August 15, 1935) is an American politician who served in the Texas House of Representatives for both District 22-3 and its successor District 91 from 1971 to 1983.

== Biography ==
Born in San Antonio, Blythe was the son of a 37-year Army veteran who served as a Special Forces mentor. His maternal ancestors were among the founders of the Republic of Texas. He was an alumnus of the University of Texas, where he received his General Business Bachelor of Arts degree, and like his father, served in the army. He is a real estate broker.
