= Amherst Independent School District =

School district in Texas

Location
- 100 N Main; Amherst, Texas ESC Region 17 USA
- Coordinates: 34°1′1″N 102°24′35″W

District information
- Type: Independent school district
- Grades: Pre-K through 12
- Superintendent: Joel Rodgers
- Schools: 2 (2018-19)
- NCES District ID: 4808160

Students and staff
- Students: 178 (2010-11)
- Teachers: 28.00(2018-19) (on full-time equivalent (FTE) basis)
- Student–teacher ratio: 9.00 (2009-10)
- Athletic conference: UIL Class 1A 6-man Football Division II
- District mascot: Bulldogs
- Colors: Blue, white

Other information
- TEA District Accountability Rating for 2011-12: Academically Unacceptable
- Website: Amherst ISD

Amherst School

Location
- 101 N Main St. Amherst, Texas 79312-0248; United States

Information
- School type: Public high school
- School district: Amherst Independent School District
- Principal: Mike Ritchie
- Staff: 19.00 (FTE)
- Grades: PK-12
- Enrollment: 142 (2018-19)
- Student to teacher ratio: 7.47
- Colors: Blue & White
- Athletics conference: UIL Class A
- Mascot: Bulldog
- Website: Amherst High School

Amherst Independent School District is a public school district based in Amherst, Texas (USA). The district operates one K-12 school, Amherst School.

The district includes a section of central Lamb County.

== Finances ==
In the 2010–2011 school year, the appraised valuation of property in the district was $51,219,000. The maintenance tax rate was $0.104 and the bond tax rate was $0.000 per $100 of appraised valuation.

In the 2019–2021 school year, the overall expenditure was $1,945,848.

== Academic achievement ==
In 2011, the school district was rated "academically unacceptable" by the Texas Education Agency. Six percent of districts in Texas in 2011 received the same rating. No state accountability ratings were to be given to districts in 2012. A school district in Texas can receive one of four possible rankings from the Texas Education Agency: exemplary (the highest possible ranking), recognized, academically acceptable and academically unacceptable (the lowest possible ranking).

Historical district TEA accountability ratings

- 2004: academically acceptable
- 2005: academically acceptable
- 2006: academically acceptable
- 2007: academically acceptable
- 2008: academically acceptable
- 2009: academically acceptable
- 2010: academically acceptable
- 2011: academically unacceptable

In 2015, the school was rated "Met Standard" by the Texas Education Agency.

== Schools ==
In the 2011–2012 school year, the district had students in two schools.

- Amherst School (grades PK-12)
- PEP (grades 9–12)

=== Athletics ===
Amherst High School participates in Basketball, American football, Track/cross country and Golf for boys. The school also participates Basketball Track/cross country and Golf for girls. For the 2012 through 2014 school years, Amherst High School was to play six-man football in UIL Class 1A 6-man Football Division II.

The Amherst Bulldogs compete in these sports:

Cross Country, 6-Man Football, Basketball, Golf, Tennis & Track.

== See also ==
- List of school districts in Texas
- List of high schools in Texas
