= Earth, Texas =

- City
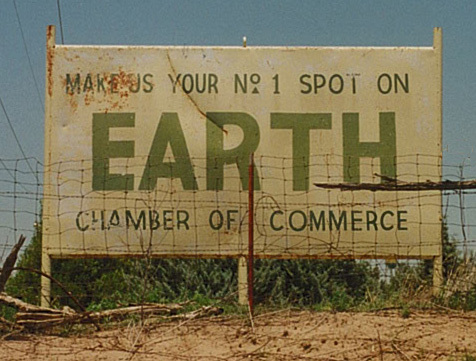
- Welcome sign of Earth, Texas

- Location within Texas
- Coordinates: 34°13′59″N 102°24′39″W
- Country: United States
- State: Texas
- County: Lamb
- Region: Llano Estacado
- Established: 1924
- Founder: William E. Halsell

Area
  - Total: 1.20 sq mi (3.11 km^{2})
  - Land: 1.20 sq mi (3.11 km^{2})
  - Water: 0 sq mi (0.00 km^{2})
- Elevation: 3,694 ft (1,126 m)

Population (2020)
  - Total: 901
  - Density: 750/sq mi (290/km^{2})
- Time zone: UTC-6 (CST)
- ZIP code: 79031
- Area code: 806
- FIPS code: 48-21928

Earth is a small, rural city in Lamb County, Texas, United States. As of 2023, its population was 897. It is the only place on Earth with such a name.

== History ==
Earth was established by William E. Halsell, who laid out the townsite in 1924. Originally, Halsell named the city Fairlawn, but in 1925, it was renamed Earth when the city learned that a town in Texas already had the name Fairlawn. To find a new name, the townspeople sent in suggestions, and the agreed-upon best name was chosen. The name Earth was submitted by Ora Hume (O.H.) Reeves, who became the owner of the city hotel. Mr. Reeves' son-in-law, Frank Wesley Hyatt, was the first postmaster in Earth.

== Geography and climate ==
Earth is located on the high plains of the Llano Estacado.

According to the United States Census Bureau, the city has a total area of 1.2 square miles (3.1 km^{2}).

Climate data for Earth, TX (1991-2020 normals)
Month	Jan	Feb	Mar	Apr	May	Jun	Jul	Aug	Sep	Oct	Nov	Dec	Year
Mean daily maximum °F (°C)	52.5 (11.4)	56.9 (13.8)	64.7 (18.2)	72.8 (22.7)	80.6 (27.0)	88.6 (31.4)	90.3 (32.4)	88.9 (31.6)	82.3 (27.9)	72.9 (22.7)	61.8 (16.6)	52.8 (11.6)	72.1 (22.3)
Daily mean °F (°C)	38.8 (3.8)	42.3 (5.7)	49.9 (9.9)	57.8 (14.3)	67.0 (19.4)	75.7 (24.3)	78.2 (25.7)	76.8 (24.9)	69.8 (21.0)	59.2 (15.1)	47.9 (8.8)	39.6 (4.2)	58.6 (14.8)
Mean daily minimum °F (°C)	25.2 (−3.8)	27.8 (−2.3)	35.1 (1.7)	42.9 (6.1)	53.5 (11.9)	62.8 (17.1)	66.2 (19.0)	64.7 (18.2)	57.4 (14.1)	45.4 (7.4)	34.0 (1.1)	26.4 (−3.1)	45.1 (7.3)
Average precipitation inches (mm)	0.62 (16)	0.58 (15)	1.20 (30)	1.18 (30)	2.29 (58)	2.73 (69)	2.33 (59)	2.46 (62)	2.39 (61)	1.62 (41)	0.81 (21)	0.80 (20)	19.01 (483)
Average snowfall inches (cm)	1.3 (3.3)	1.6 (4.1)	0.7 (1.8)	0.2 (0.51)	0.0 (0.0)	0.0 (0.0)	0.0 (0.0)	0.0 (0.0)	0.0 (0.0)	0.2 (0.51)	1.6 (4.1)	2.2 (5.6)	7.8 (20)
Average precipitation days (≥ 0.01 in)	2.8	3.1	4.0	3.8	6.0	6.6	5.5	6.7	5.6	4.0	2.8	3.7	54.6
Average snowy days (≥ 0.1 in)	1.1	0.9	0.4	0.1	0.0	0.0	0.0	0.0	0.0	0.2	0.6	1.4	4.7
Source: NOAA

== Demographics ==
Historical population
Census	Pop.	Note	%±
1950	539		—
1960	1,104		104.8%
1970	1,152		4.3%
1980	1,512		31.3%
1990	1,228		−18.8%
2000	1,109		−9.7%
2010	1,065		−4.0%
2020	901		−15.4%
U.S. Decennial Census

=== 2020 census ===
As of the 2020 census, Earth had a population of 901, and the median age was 37.2 years; 28.7% of residents were under 18 and 18.0% were 65 or older. For every 100 females, there were 90.5 males, and for every 100 females 18 and over, there were 87.7 males 18 and over.

Of the 329 households in Earth, 37.7% had children under 18 living in them, 48.0% were married-couple households, 16.4% were households with a male householder and no spouse or partner present, and 28.3% were households with a female householder and no spouse or partner present. About 22.8% of all households were made up of individuals, and 13.1% had someone living alone who was 65 or older. There were 224 families residing in the city.

The city had 390 housing units, of which 15.6% were vacant. The homeowner vacancy rate was 1.1% and the rental vacancy rate was 10.8%.

None of residents lived in urban areas, while 100.0% lived in rural areas.

Racial composition as of the 2020 census
Race	Number	Percentage
White	416	46.2%
Black or African American	15	1.7%
American Indian and Alaska Native	2	0.2%
Native Hawaiian and other Pacific Islander	1	0.1%
Some other race	202	22.4%
Two or more races	265	29.4%
Hispanic or Latino (of any race)	636	70.6%

=== 2000 census ===
As of the 2000 census, 1,109 people, 395 households, and 293 families resided in the city. The population density was 926.2 inhabitants per square mile (357.6/km^{2}). The 458 housing units had an average density of 382.5 per square mile (147.7/km^{2}). The racial makeup of the city was 73.13% White, 2.89% African American, 0.81% Native American, 22.09% from other races, and 1.08% from two or more races. Hispanics or Latinos of any race were 52.93% of the population.

Of the 395 households, 38.5% had children under 18 living with them, 59.7% were married couples living together, 10.9% had a female householder with no husband present, and 25.8% were not families. About 22.8% of all households were made up of individuals, and 13.7% had someone living alone who was 65 or older. The average household size was 2.81, and the average family size was 3.33.

In the city, the age distribution was 31.0% under 18, 9.3% from 18 to 24, 23.5% from 25 to 44, 21.6% from 45 to 64, and 14.5% who were 65 or older. The median age was 34 years. For every 100 females, there were 89.9 males. For every 100 females 18 and over, there were 92.2 males.

The median income in the city for a household was $25,595 and for a family was $29,688. Males had a median income of $27,396 versus $15,938 for females. The per capita income for the city was $12,191. About 20.0% of families and 27.3% of the population were below the poverty line, including 36.5% of those under 18 and 20.8% of those 65 or over.

== Education ==
The City of Earth is served by the Springlake-Earth Independent School District and home to the Springlake-Earth High School Wolverines.

== See also ==
- Plant X
