= Max Carriker =

American politician (1921–1979)

Max Dan Carriker (30 August 1921 – 9 September 1979) was an American farmer and politician from Texas.

Carriker was born on 30 August 1921, and served in the United States Army Air Forces during World War II. Upon returning to Texas, he started a business with his father Calvin, and specialized in seed breeding. Max Carriker was active in the West Texas Chamber of Commerce and was president of the school board in Roby before serving three consecutive terms as a Democratic member of the Texas House of Representatives. From 1959 to 1963, Carriker represented district 91, and was reelected in his final term to the seat in district 80. He died on 9 September 1979.
