= Plant X =

Power plant in Texas

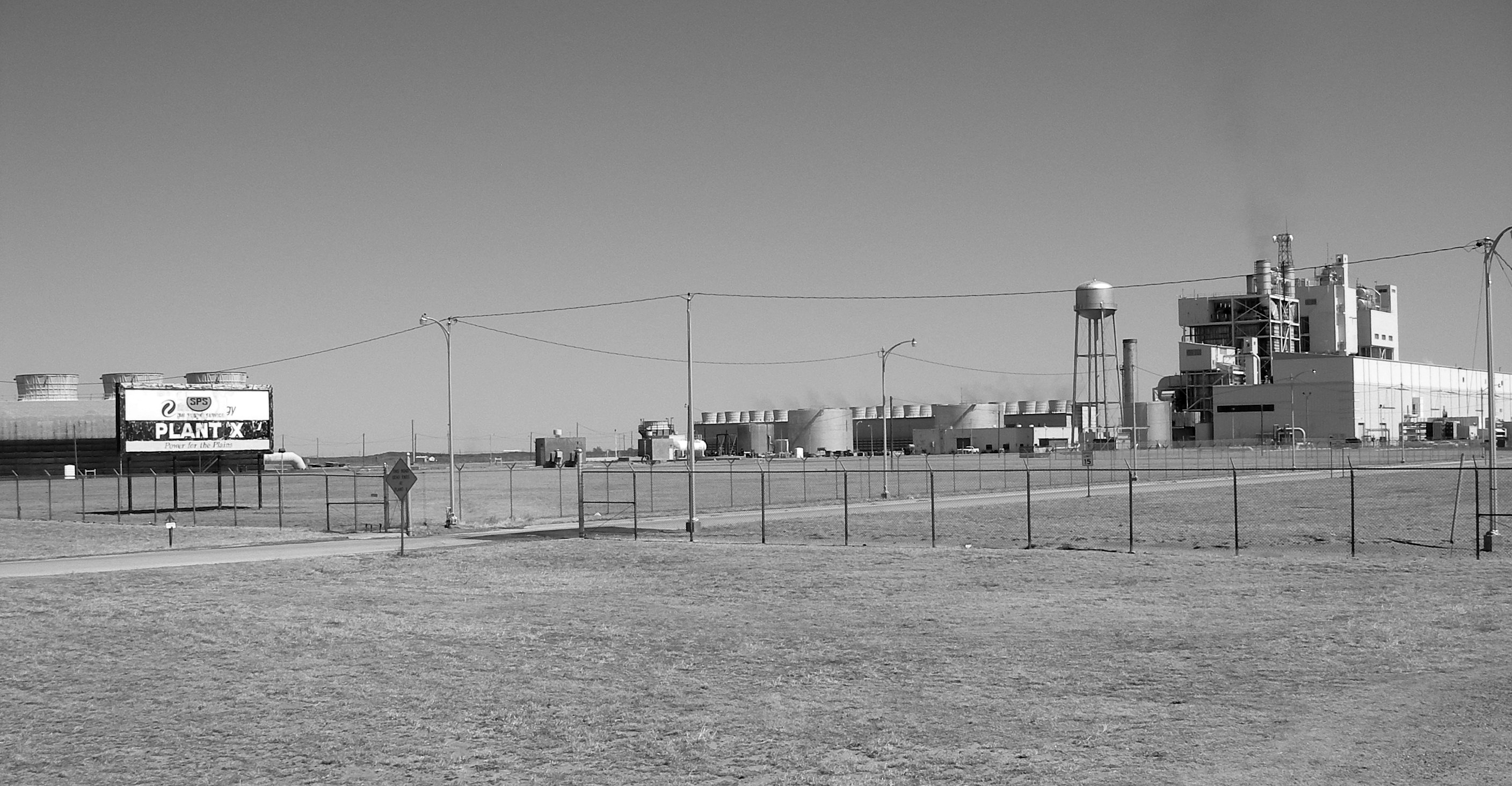
- Plant X near Earth
- Country: United States
- Location: Lamb County, Texas
- Coordinates: 34°09′57″N 102°24′38″W
- Commission date: 1952
- Owner: Xcel Energy
- Operator: Southwestern Public Service

Thermal power station
- Primary fuel: Natural gas
- Secondary fuel: Fuel oil

Power generation
- Units operational: 4
- Nameplate capacity: 442 MW

External links
- Website: Official website: Plant X

Plant X is a steam–electric power plant located in the partially vegetated sandhills south of the West Texas town of Earth in Lamb County, Texas. It is owned and operated by Southwestern Public Service Company, a subsidiary of Xcel Energy.

== History ==
At the time Plant X was being designed, power plants were usually named after their location. During the initial stages of the design process, no location had been selected, so engineers referred to the generating station simply as “Plant X” and the name stuck.

When the President of Southwestern Public Service Company announced that the company planned to build a new power plant on the high plains of the Llano Estacado, William L. Broadhurst of the Division of Ground Water of the Geological Survey recommended that they build it in the Sand Hills area of Lamb County. The USGS groundwater program had already determined that there was an unusually large saturated thickness of freshwater in the Ogallala Aquifer beneath the Sand Hills. As a result, Plant X was located where Broadhurst suggested.

Plant X is primarily powered by natural gas, although fuel oil can be used as an alternative. It has four operating units: Unit 1 was brought on-line in 1952 and is capable of producing 48 MW; Unit 2 was added in 1953 and has a production capability of 102 MW; Unit 3 was constructed in 1955 and is rated at 103 MW, and Unit 4 is a 189 MW unit, added in 1964. The total power production capability of Plant X is 442 MW.

== Water use ==
With regard to water-use efficiency, Plant X was designed to be a "zero-discharge facility," which means no process waters are directly discharged from the plant site. Operating in a semiarid region with a limited water supply, engineers developed a recycling system to reduce water use at Plant X. A pipeline was constructed to send Plant X blowdown water (used water from plant operations) for treatment and recycling at the nearby Tolk Station, a coal-fired power plant located 15 km (9.3 mi) to the west. As a result, the combined water consumption of Plant X and Tolk Station was reduced by about 180 million gallons per year.

Nevertheless, Plant X still "consumes huge quantities of groundwater." The generation of steam, the discharge of steam to the atmosphere, and the evaporation of water from massive cooling towers results in a significant extraction of groundwater from the Ogallala Aquifer. The combination of groundwater pumping for power production and water extraction by irrigated agriculture has caused groundwater levels beneath the Sand Hills to drop appreciably. As a result, most natural springs in the area have stopped flowing and spring-fed lakes, such as Spring Lake and Soda Lake, have dried completely.

== See also ==
- List of power stations in Texas
