= Charles Tupper Jr. =

American politician

Charles Frederick Tupper Jr. (born 1942) is an American former politician.

Tupper, a Democrat from El Paso, Texas, served two consecutive terms on the Texas House of Representatives from 1971 to 1975. During his first term, Tupper's district was numbered 67-2, and in his second, the district became 72-2.
