= Lamb County, Texas =

County in Texas, United States

- County
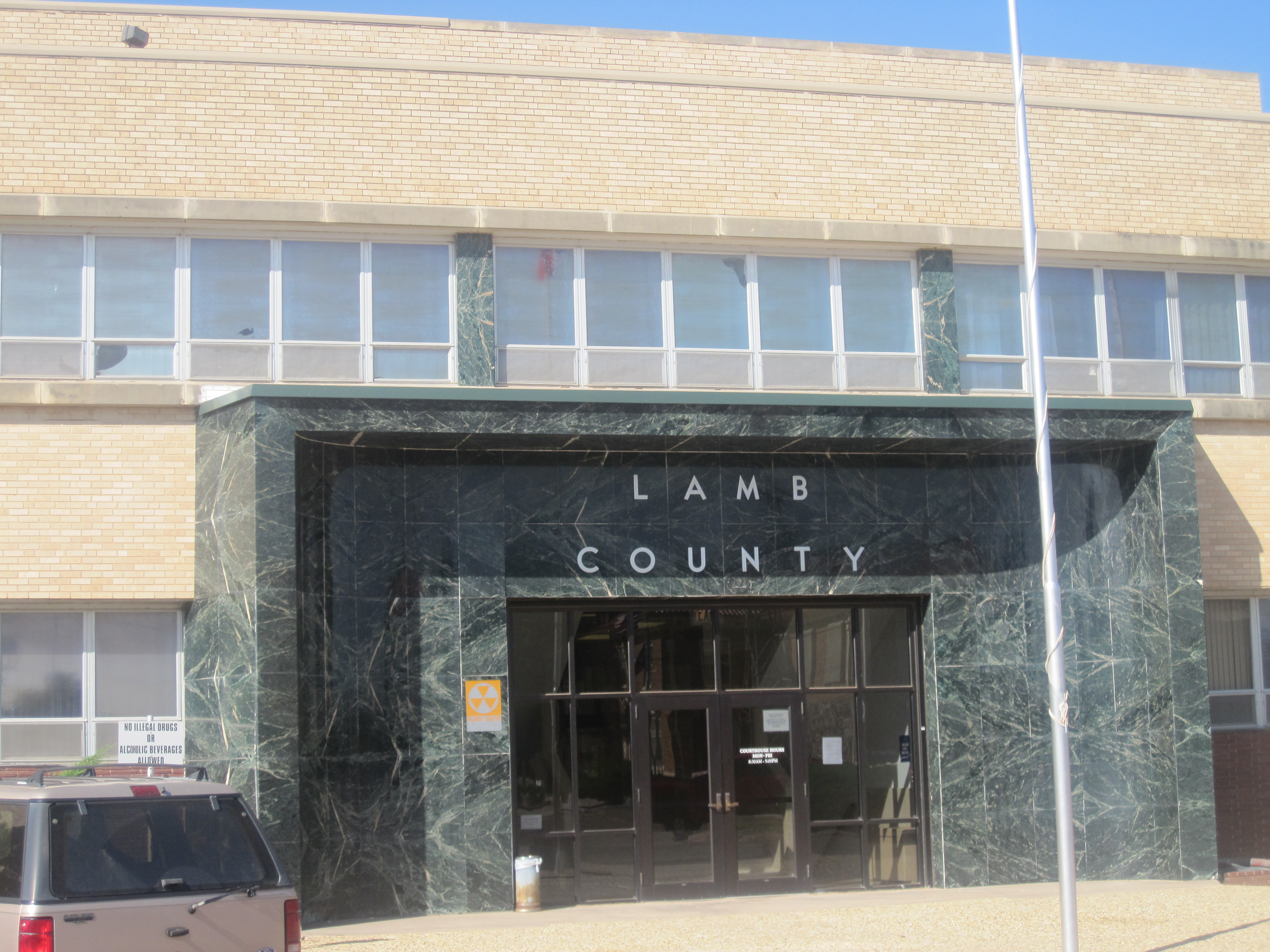
- Lamb County Courthouse in Littlefield

- Location within the U.S. state of Texas
- Coordinates: 34°04′N 102°21′W
- Country: United States
- State: Texas
- Founded: 1908
- Named for: George A. Lamb
- Seat: Littlefield
- Largest city: Littlefield

Area
  - Total: 1,018 sq mi (2,640 km^{2})
  - Land: 1,016 sq mi (2,630 km^{2})
  - Water: 1.5 sq mi (3.9 km^{2}) 0.2%

Population (2020)
  - Total: 13,045
  - Estimate (2025): 12,579 ▼
  - Density: 12.84/sq mi (4.957/km^{2})
- Time zone: UTC−6 (Central)
  - Summer (DST): UTC−5 (CDT)
- Congressional district: 19th
- Website: www.co.lamb.tx.us

Lamb County is a county located in the U.S. state of Texas. As of the 2020 census, its population was 13,045. Its county seat is Littlefield. The county was created in 1876, but not organized until 1908. It is named for George A. Lamb, who died in the Battle of San Jacinto.

Lamb County was the home of the Texas House Speaker Bill W. Clayton, who served from 1975 until 1983. It is also the birthplace of country music singer Waylon Jennings.

== History ==
Lamb County was formed in 1876 from portions of Bexar County. It was named after George A. Lamb, a soldier in the Battle of San Jacinto.

In the 1960s, the water table began to decline. From the 1980s until 2023, the population declined by about 33%. Between around 2013 and 2023, the population declined by about 8%.

During the COVID-19 pandemic, Lamb County had an almost one per 100 death rate as of March 2023. As of that month, Lamb County, among American counties with 2,500 or more residents, had the eighth-highest COVID-19 death rate.

By 2023, water scarcity among farms became extensive, and many younger people moved to other counties for jobs.

== Geography ==
According to the U.S. Census Bureau, the county has a total area of 1,018 square miles (2,640 km^{2}), of which 1.5 square miles (3.9 km^{2}) (0.2%) are covered by water.

=== Major highways ===
- U.S. Highway 70
- U.S. Highway 84
- U.S. Highway 385
- Texas State Highway Loop 385
- Texas State Highway Loop 430

=== Adjacent Counties ===
- Castro County (north)
- Hale County (east)
- Lubbock County (southeast)
- Hockley County (south)
- Cochran County (southwest)
- Bailey County (west)
- Parmer County (northwest)

== Demographics ==
Historical population
Census	Pop.	Note	%±
1890	4		—
1900	31		675.0%
1910	540		1,641.9%
1920	1,175		117.6%
1930	17,452		1,385.3%
1940	17,606		0.9%
1950	20,015		13.7%
1960	21,896		9.4%
1970	17,770		−18.8%
1980	18,669		5.1%
1990	15,072		−19.3%
2000	14,709		−2.4%
2010	13,977		−5.0%
2020	13,045		−6.7%
2025 (est.)	12,579	▼	−3.6%
U.S. Decennial Census; 1850–2010 2010 2020

=== 2020 census ===
As of the 2020 census, the county had a population of 13,045. The median age was 38.0 years; 27.1% of the residents were under 18 and 18.0% were 65 or older. FThe female/male ratio was 1:0.984 males overall and 1:0.963 for those 18 and over.

The racial makeup of the county was 56.5% White, 3.5% Black or African American, 0.6% American Indian and Alaska Native, 0.1% Asian, 0.1% Native Hawaiian and Pacific Islander, 15.9% from some other race, and 23.3% from two or more races. Hispanic or Latino residents of any race comprised 57.1% of the population.

About 43.1% of residents lived in urban areas, while 56.9% lived in rural areas.

Of the 4,864 households in the county, 35.0% had children under 18 living in them, 50.3% were married-couple households, 18.8% were households with a male householder and no spouse or partner present, and 25.2% were households with a female householder and no spouse or partner present. About 25.0% of all households were made up of individuals, and 12.6% had someone living alone who was 65 or older.

The county had 5,882 housing units, of which 17.3% were vacant. Among occupied housing units, 71.9% were owner-occupied and 28.1% were renter-occupied. The homeowner vacancy rate was 1.0% and the rental vacancy rate was 8.9%.

=== Racial and ethnic composition ===
Lamb County, Texas – Racial and ethnic composition Note: the US Census treats Hispanic/Latino as an ethnic category. This table excludes Latinos from the racial categories and assigns them to a separate category. Hispanics/Latinos may be of any race.
Race / Ethnicity (NH = Non-Hispanic)	Pop 2000	Pop 2010	Pop 2020	% 2000	% 2010	% 2020
White alone (NH)	7,553	6,020	4,981	51.35%	43.07%	38.18%
Black or African American alone (NH)	615	555	392	4.18%	3.97%	3.00%
Native American or Alaska Native alone (NH)	43	39	15	0.29%	0.28%	0.11%
Asian alone (NH)	9	17	4	0.06%	0.12%	0.03%
Pacific Islander alone (NH)	3	4	5	0.02%	0.03%	0.04%
Other race alone (NH)	3	16	24	0.02%	0.11%	0.18%
Multiracial (NH)	90	95	175	0.61%	0.68%	1.34%
Hispanic or Latino (any race)	6,393	7,231	7,449	43.46%	51.73%	57.10%
Total	14,709	13,977	13,045	100.00%	100.00%	100.00%

=== 2000 census ===
As of the 2000 census, 14,709 people, 5,360 households, and 3,991 families resided in the county. The population density was 14 people per square mile (5.4 people/km^{2}). The 6,294 housing units averaged 6 units per square mile (2.3/km^{2}). The racial makeup of the county was 76.1% White, 4.3% Black or African American, 0.7% Native American, 0.1% Asian, less than 0.05% Pacific Islander, 16.9% from other races, and 1.9% from two or more races. About 43.5% of the population was Hispanic or Latino of any race.

Of the 5,360 households, 35.4% had children under 18 living with them, 59.5% were married couples living together, 10.2% had a female householder with no husband present, and 25.5% were not families. About 23.7% of all households were made up of individuals, and 12.8% had someone living alone who was 65 or older. The average household size was 2.69, and the average family size was 3.19.

In the county, the population was distributed as 29.6% under 18, 8.1% from 18 to 24, 24.2% from 25 to 44, 20.8% from 45 to 64, and 17.3% who were 65 or older. The median age was 36 years. For every 100 females, there were 94.2 males. For every 100 females age 18 and over, there were 89.9 males.

The median income in the county for a household was $36,898 and for a family was $31,833. Males had a median income of $36,434 versus $30,342 for females. The per capita income for the county was $30,169. About 18.0% of families and 10.9% of the population were below the poverty line, including 27.3% of those under 18 and 15.3% of those 65 or over.

== Transportation ==
=== Major highways ===
- U.S. Highway 70
- U.S. Highway 84
- U.S. Highway 385

=== Airports ===
Littlefield Municipal Airport is located in Lamb County, 3 nautical miles (5.6 km) west of the central business district of Littlefield, Texas.

== Communities ==
=== Cities ===
- Amherst
- Earth
- Littlefield (county seat)
- Olton
- Sudan

=== Town ===
- Springlake

=== Census-designated place ===
- Spade

=== Unincorporated community ===
- Fieldton

== Education ==
School districts serving the county include:

- Amherst Independent School District
- Anton Independent School District
- Littlefield Independent School District
- Muleshoe Independent School District
- Olton Independent School District
- Springlake-Earth Independent School District
- Sudan Independent School District
- Whiteface Consolidated Independent School District

The county is in the service area of South Plains College.

== Media ==
As of 2023, there is one newspaper, Lamb County Leader-News, with three employees. An additional employee had died of COVID-19 in 2022, and the newspaper did not hire another individual.

The Olton Enterprise, another newspaper, stopped publication in 2021.

In 2023, Alejandro de la Garza wrote, in regards to the media landscape during the COVID-19 pandemic as the pandemic had caused damage to local media outlets, "for many residents, their Facebook feeds took the place of local media."

== Gallery ==
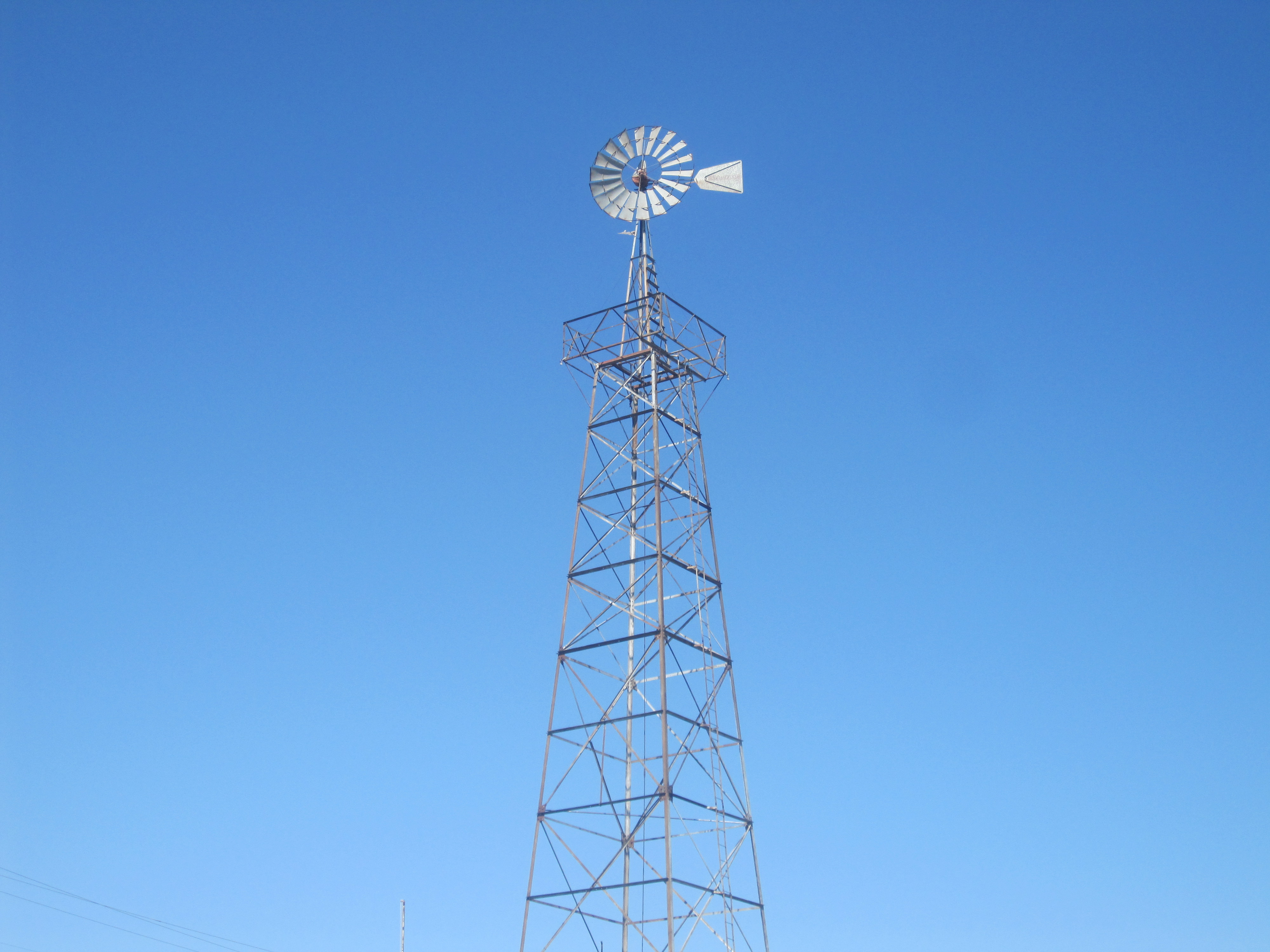
Littlefield claims the world's tallest windmill.

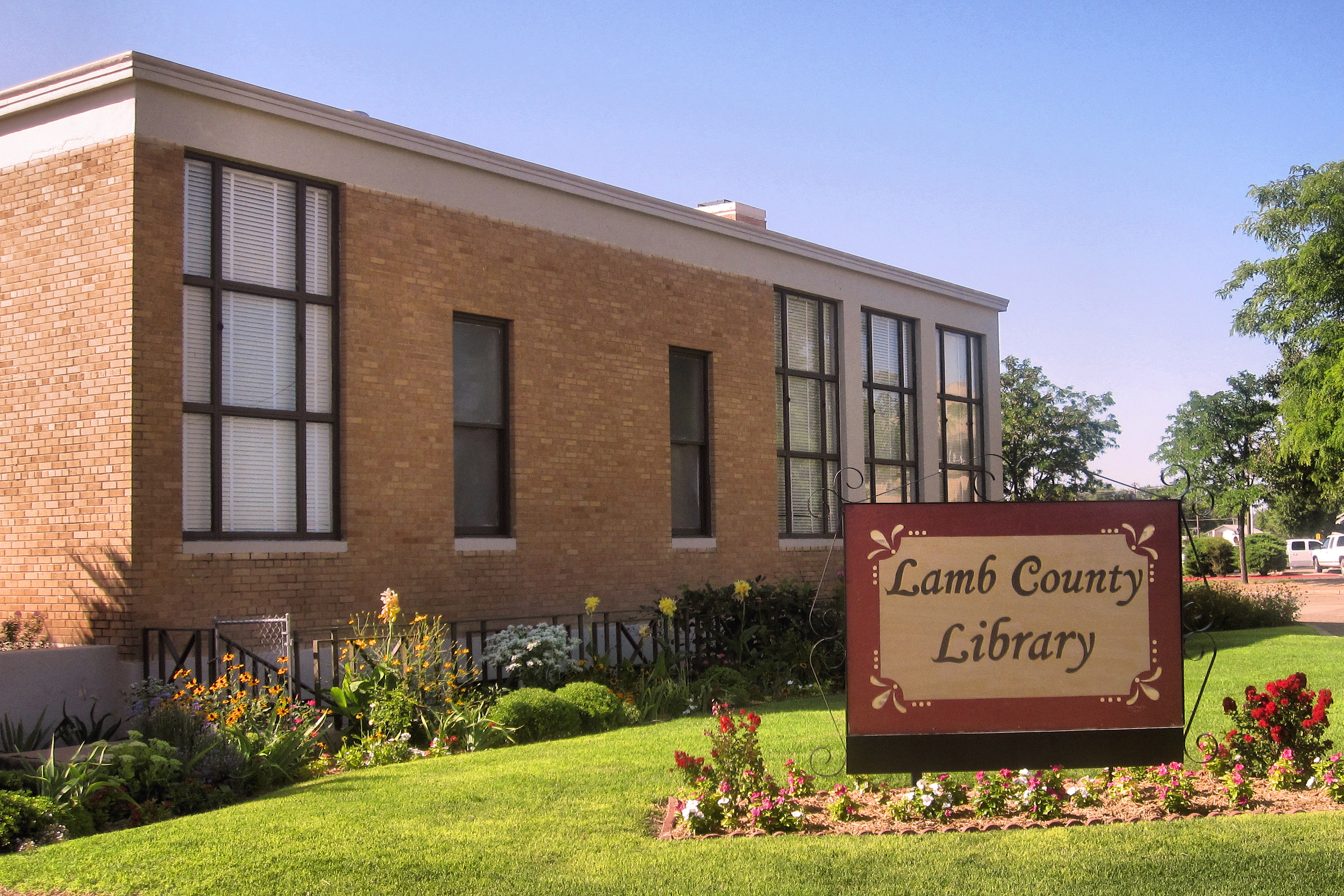
Lamb County Library in downtown Littlefield across from the First Baptist Church

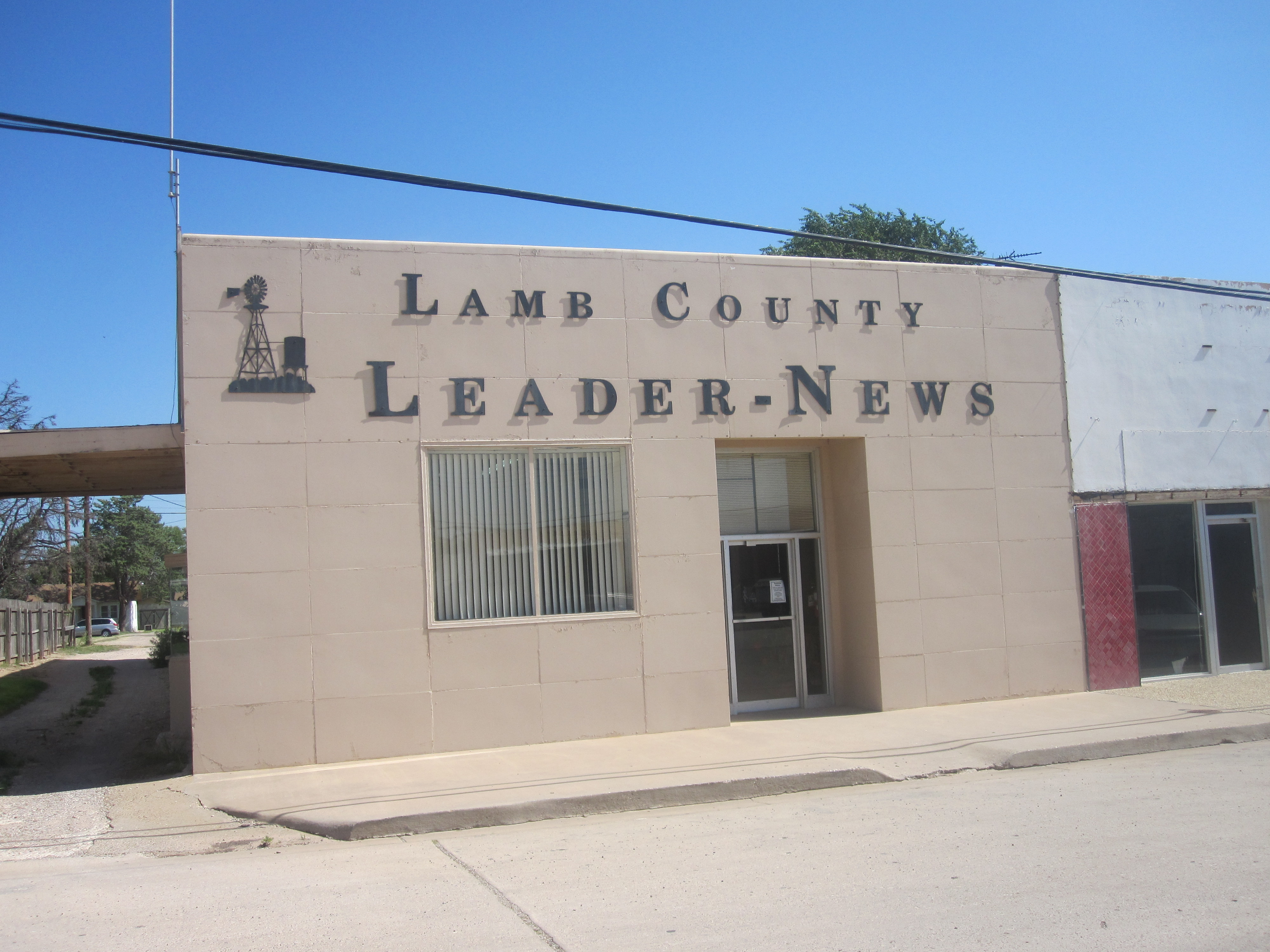
Lamb County Leader-News in Littlefield

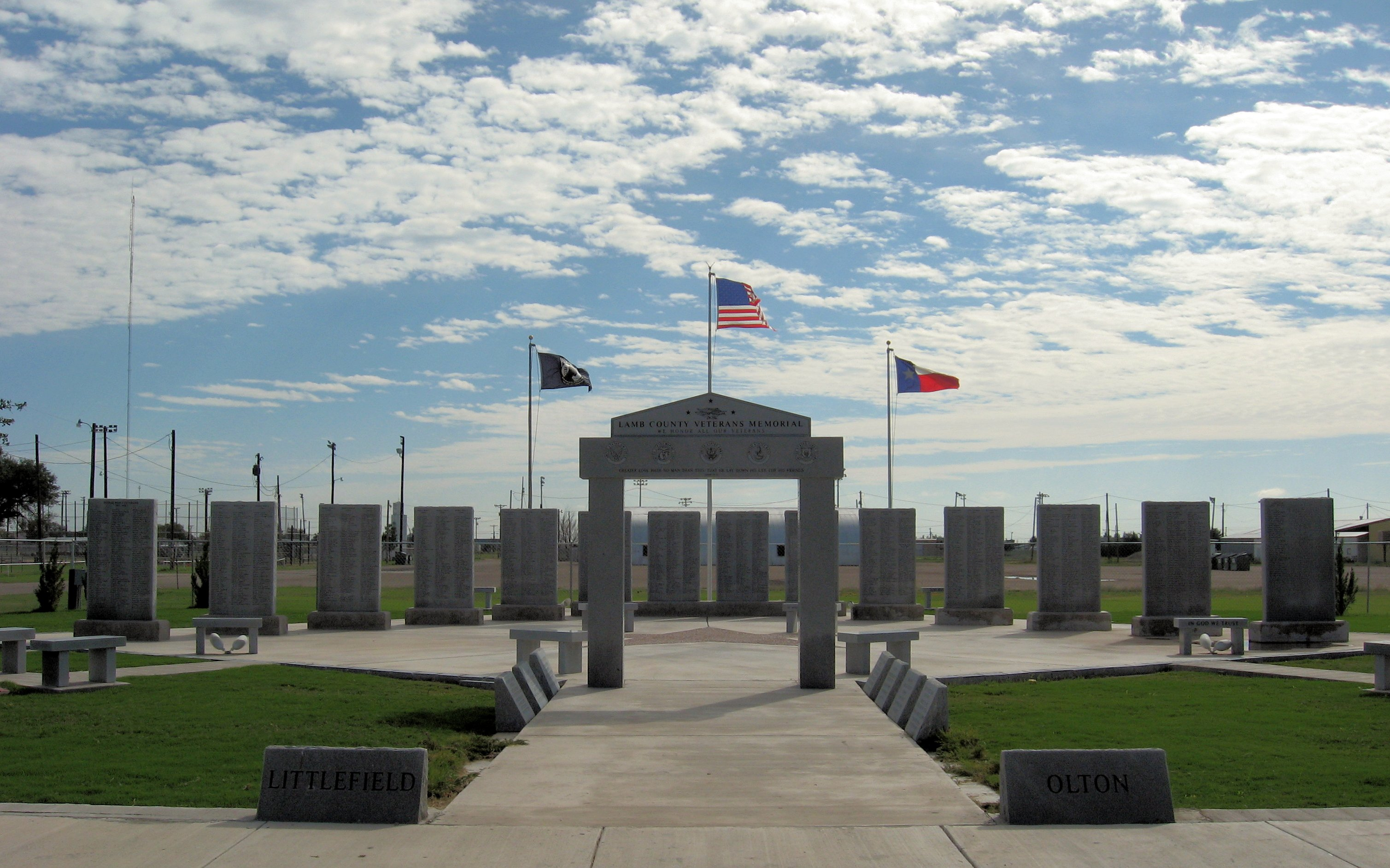
Lamb County Veterans Memorial

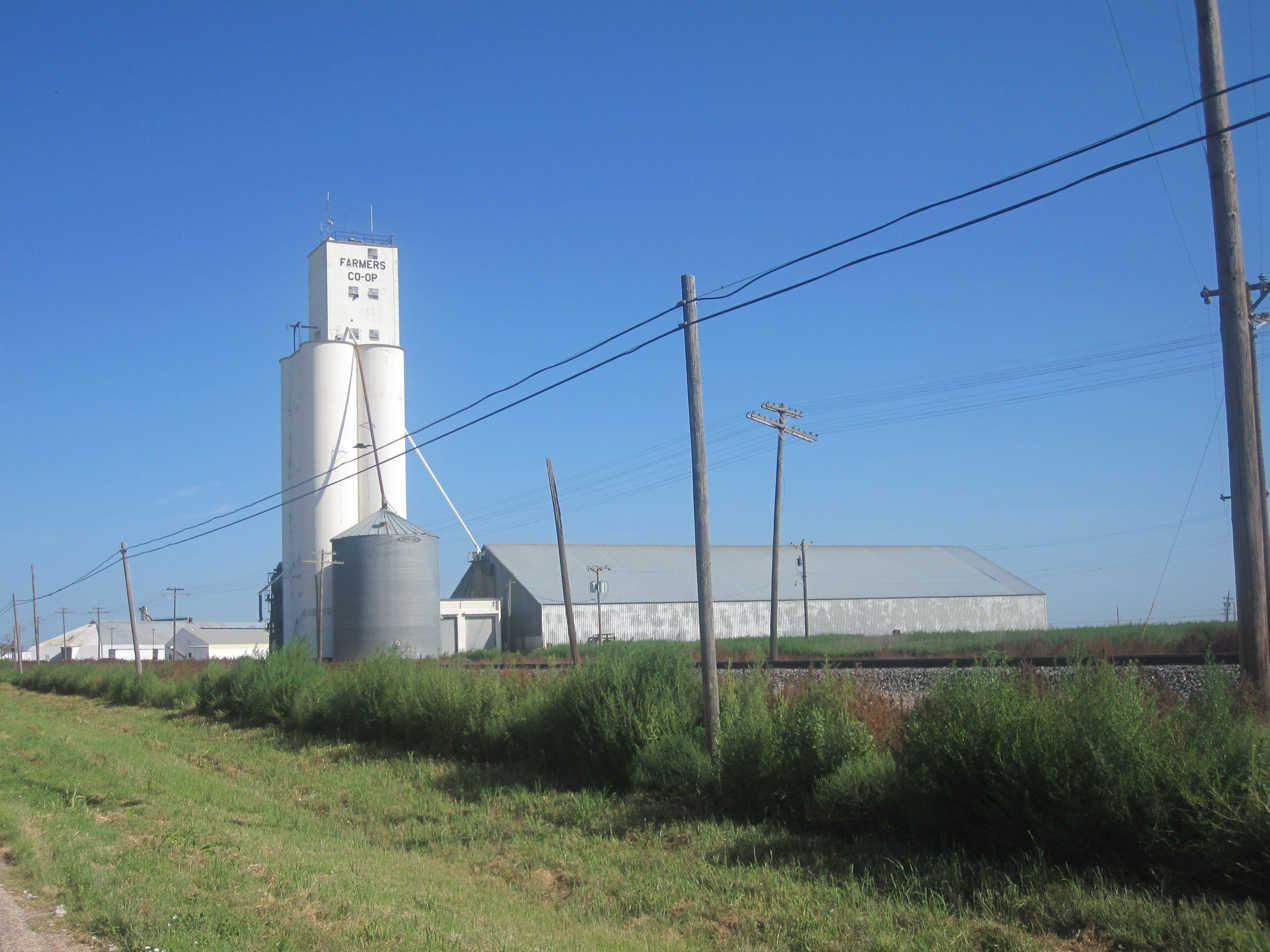
Littlefield Farmers Co-op grain elevator

== Politics ==
Lamb County is located within District 88 of the Texas House of Representatives. Lamb County is located within District 28 of the Texas Senate.

United States presidential election results for Lamb County, Texas
Year	Republican		Democratic		Third party(ies)	
Year	No.	%	No.	%	No.	%
1912	6	7.14%	53	63.10%	25	29.76%
1916	14	8.14%	150	87.21%	8	4.65%
1920	136	32.46%	264	63.01%	19	4.53%
1924	121	23.87%	356	70.22%	30	5.92%
1928	1,266	74.21%	440	25.79%	0	0.00%
1932	271	8.24%	2,978	90.57%	39	1.19%
1936	300	11.41%	2,320	88.21%	10	0.38%
1940	513	13.56%	3,259	86.15%	11	0.29%
1944	616	17.89%	2,407	69.89%	421	12.22%
1948	475	12.03%	3,286	83.25%	186	4.71%
1952	2,913	51.36%	2,748	48.45%	11	0.19%
1956	1,840	35.54%	3,325	64.23%	12	0.23%
1960	2,764	46.01%	3,089	51.42%	154	2.56%
1964	2,022	31.85%	4,318	68.01%	9	0.14%
1968	2,595	41.05%	2,267	35.86%	1,460	23.09%
1972	3,981	74.19%	1,350	25.16%	35	0.65%
1976	2,413	41.50%	3,374	58.02%	28	0.48%
1980	3,723	62.75%	2,132	35.93%	78	1.31%
1984	3,892	66.78%	1,919	32.93%	17	0.29%
1988	3,064	57.64%	2,230	41.95%	22	0.41%
1992	2,998	55.01%	1,737	31.87%	715	13.12%
1996	2,593	56.69%	1,683	36.79%	298	6.52%
2000	3,451	75.05%	1,114	24.23%	33	0.72%
2004	3,410	79.84%	857	20.07%	4	0.09%
2008	3,344	73.90%	1,156	25.55%	25	0.55%
2012	3,058	74.75%	998	24.40%	35	0.86%
2016	3,111	77.87%	771	19.30%	113	2.83%
2020	3,521	79.70%	840	19.01%	57	1.29%
2024	3,398	81.86%	729	17.56%	24	0.58%

United States Senate election results for Lamb County, Texas1
Year	Republican		Democratic		Third party(ies)	
Year	No.	%	No.	%	No.	%
2024	3,285	79.91%	729	17.73%	97	2.36%

United States Senate election results for Lamb County, Texas2
Year	Republican		Democratic		Third party(ies)	
Year	No.	%	No.	%	No.	%
2020	3,469	79.56%	802	18.39%	89	2.04%

Texas Gubernatorial election results for Lamb County
Year	Republican		Democratic		Third party(ies)	
Year	No.	%	No.	%	No.	%
2022	2,628	85.32%	419	13.60%	33	1.07%

In the 2020 U.S. presidential election, about 80% of the county's residents selected Donald Trump.

== Healthcare ==
In August 22, 43% of the county's residents had completed at least one COVID-19 vaccination series.

== See also ==
- Recorded Texas Historic Landmarks in Lamb County
- Dry counties
- Plant X
- Llano Estacado
- West Texas
